= National Register of Historic Places listings in Vermillion County, Indiana =

Location of Vermillion County in Indiana

This is a list of the National Register of Historic Places listings in Vermillion County, Indiana.

This is intended to be a complete list of the properties and districts on the National Register of Historic Places in Vermillion County, Indiana, United States. Latitude and longitude coordinates are provided for many National Register properties and districts; these locations may be seen together in a map.

There are nine properties and districts listed on the National Register in the county. Another property was once listed but has been removed.

Properties and districts located in incorporated areas display the name of the municipality, while properties and districts in unincorporated areas display the name of their civil township. Properties and districts split between multiple jurisdictions display the names of all jurisdictions.

This National Park Service list is complete through NPS recent listings posted August 22, 2025.

== Current listings ==
	Name on the Register	Image	Date listed	Location	City or town	Description
1	Clinton Downtown Historic District	Clinton Downtown Historic District	March 15, 2000 (#00000205)	Roughly between S. Water and S. 3rd Sts., and Elm St. to the CSX railroad right-of-way 39°39′34″N 87°23′54″W	Clinton	
2	Elder-Pyle House	Elder-Pyle House	August 25, 2021 (#100006842)	120 Briarwood Ave. 39°48′15″N 87°29′42″W	Dana	Aka the Ernie Pyle State Historic Site
2	Eugene Covered Bridge	Eugene Covered Bridge	June 10, 1994 (#94000585)	Former County Road 00 over the Big Vermillion River at Eugene; 39°58′09″N 87°28′23″W	Eugene Township	
3	Hill Crest Community Center	Hill Crest Community Center	December 15, 1997 (#97001555)	505 N. 8th St. 39°40′25″N 87°24′25″W	Clinton	
4	Newport Covered Bridge	Newport Covered Bridge	June 10, 1994 (#94000589)	County Road 50N over the Little Vermillion River, northwest of Newport; 39°53′29″N 87°26′00″W	Vermillion Township	
5	Possum Bottom Covered Bridge	Possum Bottom Covered Bridge	June 10, 1994 (#94000584)	Northern side of U.S. Route 36, 0.2 miles east of its junction with East Rd. and southeast of Dana; 39°47′50″N 87°27′12″W	Helt Township	
6	Salem Methodist Episcopal Church	Salem Methodist Episcopal Church	February 22, 1979 (#79000022)	North of Clinton on State Road 63; 39°43′55″N 87°23′58″W	Helt Township	
7	Vermillion County Courthouse	Vermillion County Courthouse	December 19, 2007 (#07001283)	255 S. Main St. 39°53′05″N 87°24′34″W	Newport	
8	Vermillion County Jail and Sheriff's Residence	Vermillion County Jail and Sheriff's Residence	March 12, 1999 (#99000305)	220 E. Market St. 39°51′27″N 87°24′22″W	Newport	

== Former listing ==
	Name on the Register	Image	Date listed	Date removed	Location	City or town	Description
1	Brouilletts Creek Covered Bridge		June 10, 1994 (#94000586)	June 2, 1999	County Roads 100W and 1700S over Brouilletts Creek	Clinton	Disassembled in 1994 and currently in storage in its entirety for reassembly in the future.

== See also ==
- List of National Historic Landmarks in Indiana
- National Register of Historic Places listings in Indiana
- Listings in neighboring counties: Edgar (IL), Fountain, Parke, Vermilion (IL), Vigo, Warren
- List of Indiana state historical markers in Vermillion County
