= List of Indiana state historical markers in Vermillion County =

Location of Vermillion County in Indiana

This is a list of the Indiana state historical markers in Vermillion County.

This is intended to be a complete list of the official state historical markers placed in Vermillion County, Indiana, United States by the Indiana Historical Bureau. The locations of the historical markers and their latitude and longitude coordinates are included below when available, along with their names, years of placement, and topics as recorded by the Historical Bureau. There are 6 historical markers located in Vermillion County.

== Historical markers ==
Marker title	Image	Year placed	Location	Topics
Harrison's Crossing November 3, 1811		1960	Northbound lane of State Road 63, 100 yards north of the Vermilion River bridge across from North Vermillion High School, near Cayuga; 39°57′54″N 87°27′2″W	Military, American Indian/Native American
Newport Covered Bridge		1995	Southern end of the Newport Covered Bridge along County Road 50S, near the Little Vermilion River at Newport; 39°53′28″N 87°25′59.4″W	Transportation, Buildings and Architecture
Eugene Covered Bridge		1995	Southern end of the bridge, located over the Big Vermillion River by the junction of N. Main Street (County Road 00) and County Road 100W near Eugene; 39°58′7.5″N 87°28′24″W	Transportation, Buildings and Architecture
The Hillsdale Steps		1997	Junction of Lincoln and Second Streets in Hillsdale; 39°46′50″N 87°23′14″W	Historic District, Neighborhoods, and Towns, Buildings and Architecture
Vermillion County Jail		2001	220 E. Market Street at the Vermillion County Historical Society in Newport; 39°53′4″N 87°24′24″W	Government Institutions, Buildings and Architecture
Henry Dana Washburn		2018	527 North Main St., Clinton; 39°39′55.6″N 87°23′55.3″W	Politics

== See also ==
- List of Indiana state historical markers
- National Register of Historic Places listings in Vermillion County, Indiana
