= Isaac Pursell =

American architect

- Born: 1853; Trenton, New Jersey
- Died: August 9, 1910 (aged 56–57); Wenonah, New Jersey
- Occupation: Architect
- Buildings: St. John's Episcopal Church, Charleston, West Virginia

Isaac Pursell (June 1853 – August 9, 1910) was a Philadelphia, Pennsylvania-based architect.

He was born at Trenton, New Jersey in 1853 and attended public schools. He received architectural training in the Philadelphia offices of Samuel Sloan. He was a prolific designer of churches located in the eastern United States. Many of his church designs reflect the English Gothic Revival style. In Philadelphia, he designed the Christ Memorial Reformed Episcopal Church at Chestnut and 43rd Street; St. Matthews' Lutheran; St. Paul's Reformed Episcopal; The Calvary Methodist in Germantown (1892); St. Paul's Presbyterian; Moravian Church of the Holy Trinity (1879); Bethany Tabernacle, and Christ Protestant Episcopal.

He died at his home in Wenonah, New Jersey on August 9, 1910, and is buried in Wenonah Cemetery.

== Selected works ==
- 1883: Tygarts Valley Church, Huttonsville, West Virginia, listed on the National Register of Historic Places in 1986.
- 1887: Makemie Memorial Presbyterian Church, Snow Hill, Maryland, listed on the National Register of Historic Places in 2008.
- 1887-1888: Christ Memorial Reformed Episcopal Church, West Philadelphia, listed on the National Register of Historic Places in 1998. Demolished 2018.
- 1890: St. John's Episcopal Church (Charleston, West Virginia), Charleston, West Virginia, listed on the National Register of Historic Places in 1989.
- 1896: Third Presbyterian Church, Chester, Pennsylvania
- 1911: Hill Crest Community Center, Clinton, Indiana, listed on the National Register of Historic Places in 1997.

== Gallery ==
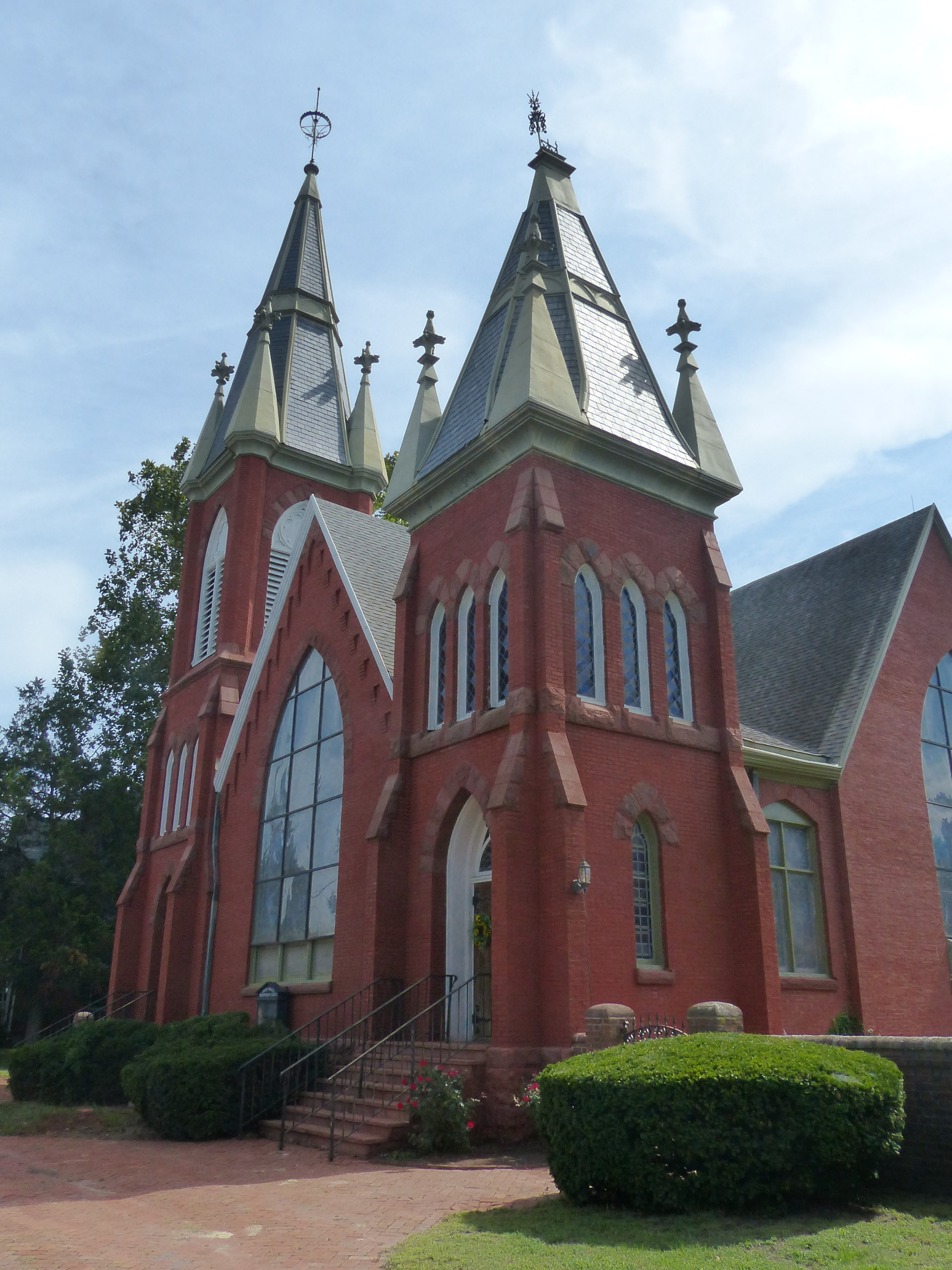
Makemie Memorial Presbyterian Church

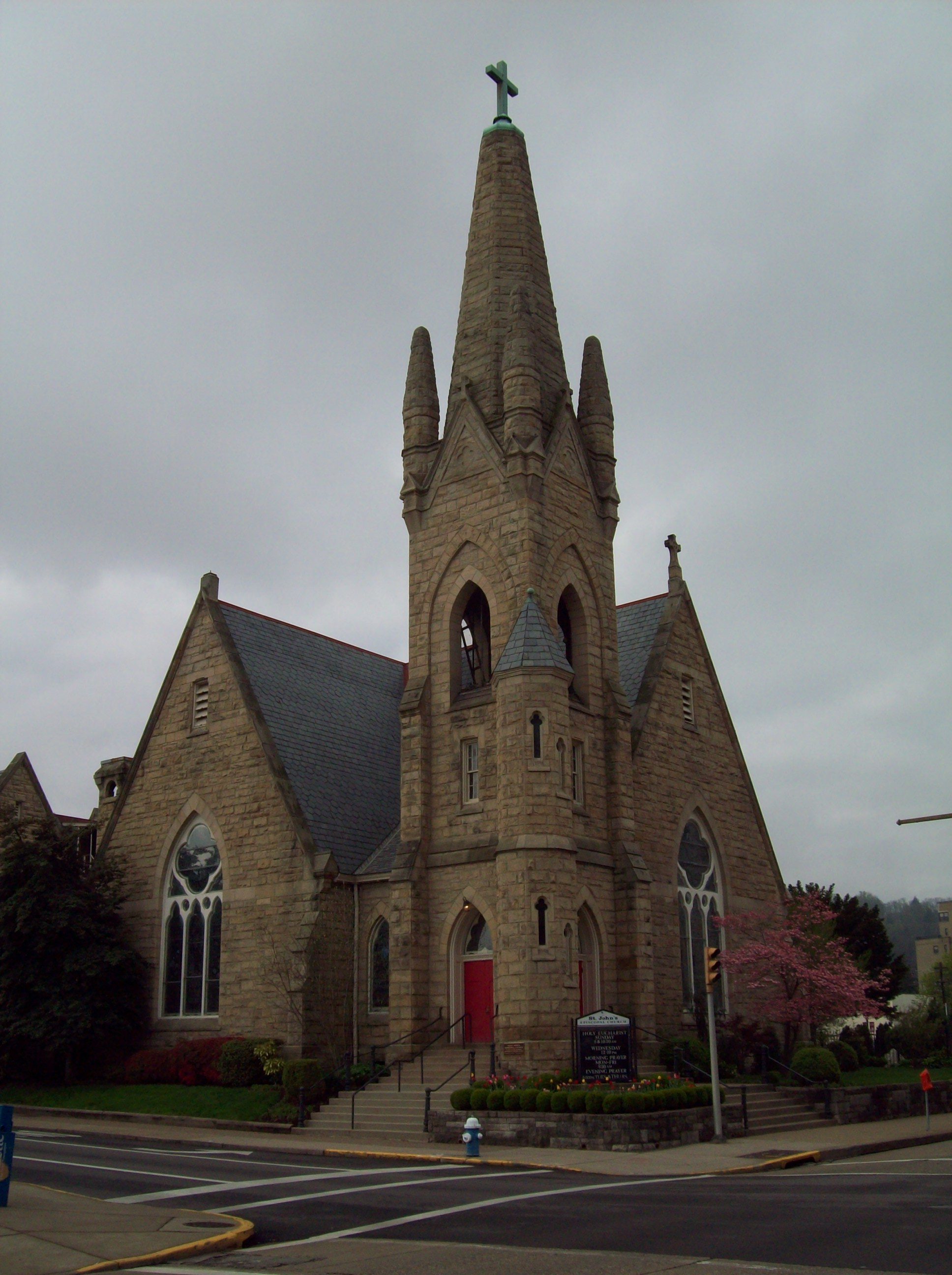
St Johns Episcopal

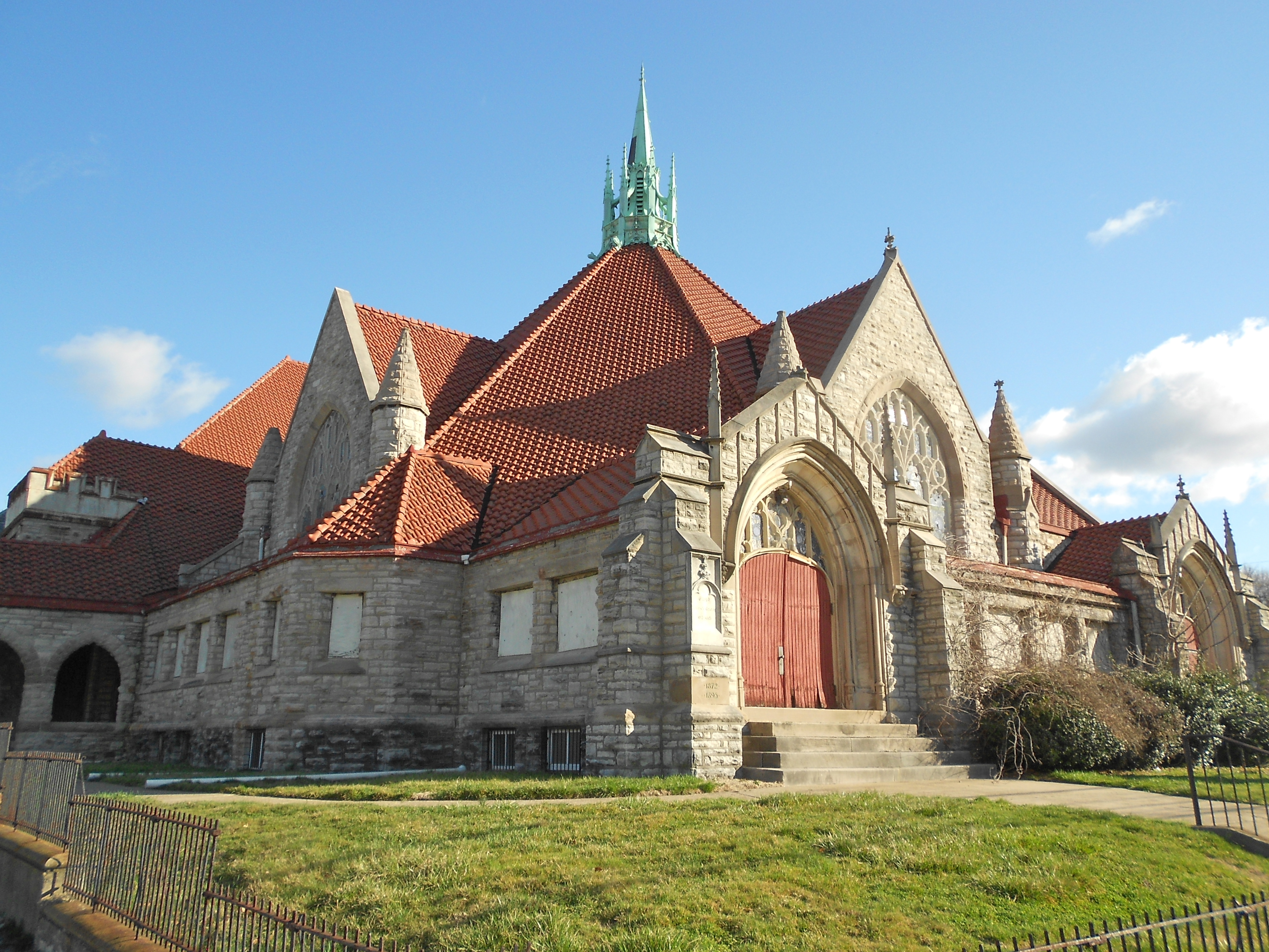
Third Presbyterian Church, Chester Pennsylvania

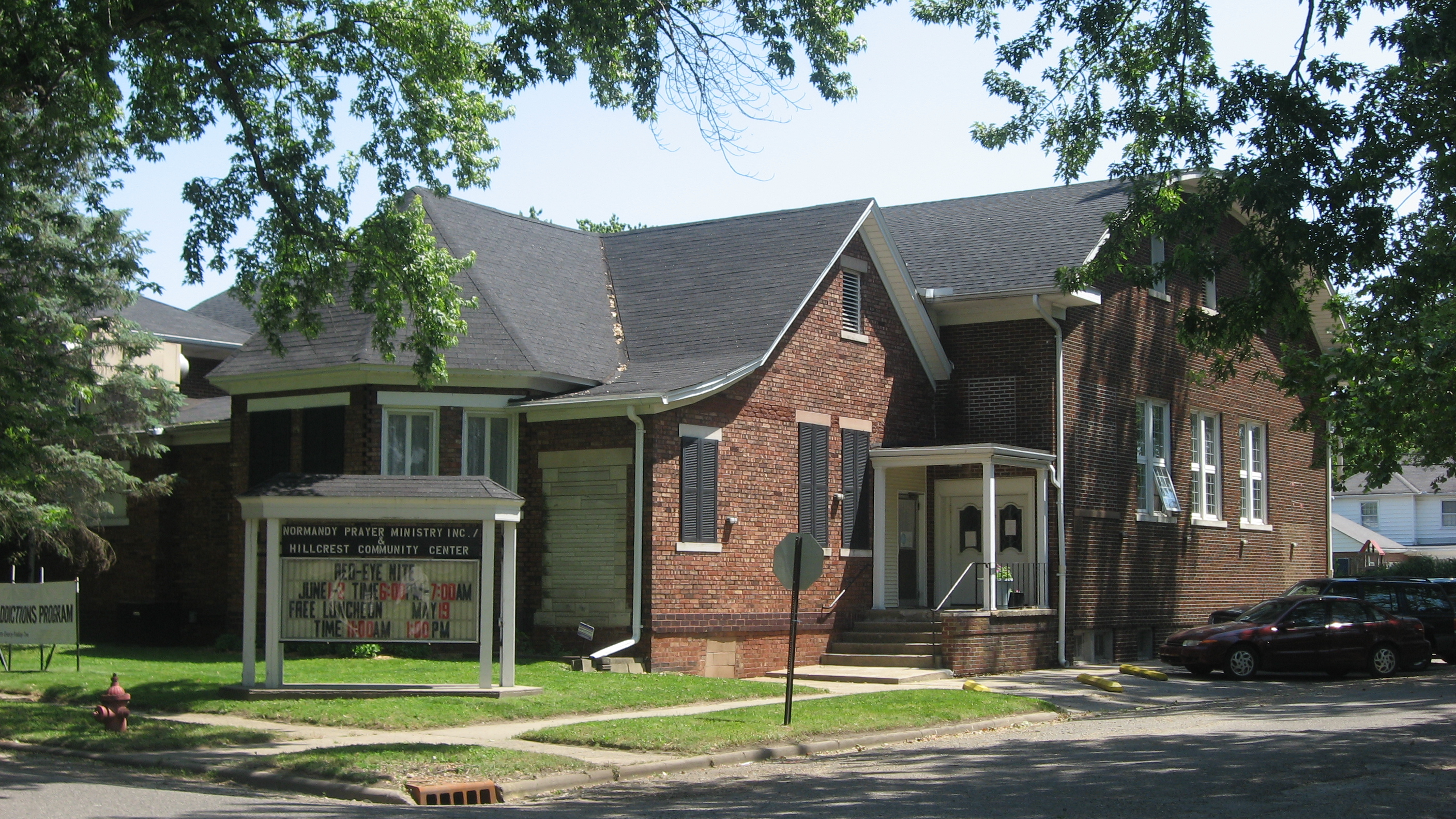
Hill Crest Community Center
