= 2026 Calcio Italiano =

The 2026 Calcio Italiano will be the inaugural edition of Calcio Italiano, a friendly men's soccer series held in Perth, Western Australia. The series will be held from 5 to 11 August 2026. The tournament will feature Serie A clubs AC Milan, Inter Milan and Juventus, as well as Serie B club Palermo.

== Background ==
The tournament will be held in Perth, Western Australia from 5 to 11 August 2026. The matches will be held at Optus Stadium in Burswood and HBF Park in the Perth Central Business District (CBD). The former venue will host a Derby della Madonnina between AC Milan and Inter Milan on 5 August, as well as a Derby d'Italia between Inter and Juventus on 8 August, while the latter venue will host a match between Juventus and Palermo on 11 August. The match between Juventus and Palermo was originally intended to be held at Optus Stadium, but was moved to HBF Park after tickets sold slower than expected.

The tournament will coincide with the 2026 Sydney Super Cup in Sydney, New South Wales, a separate friendly tournament, as well as the 2026 Anglo-Palermitan Trophy, in which Palermo will face Melbourne City at Sam Kerr Football Centre in Queens Park on 7 August to kick off their first ever Australian tour. The event will also feature the Little Italy Festival at Stadium Park in Burswood, a celebration of Italian Australian culture.

== Fan hubs and entertainment ==
Each club will have its own fan hub for the series, where fan activities will take place prior to the matches. These were announced on 28 July.

AC Milan held an open training session on 4 August at Sam Kerr Football Centre. Their official pre-match celebration will be at The Merrywell at Crown Perth in Burswood from 3:00pm on 5 August. The family-friendly event will feature disc jockeys, face painting, giveaways and appearances from AC Milan legends before the official supporters' march to Optus Stadium in the same suburb.

Inter Milan will be based at Brookfield Place in the Perth Central Business District (CBD), where a player appearance will occur on 2 August, followed by player appearances on 3 August and public trophy displays on 4 and 6 August. Additionally, Print Hall will host a lunch and a question and answer session headlined by two Inter legends, Italian Christian Vieri (who was raised in Australia) and Argentine Javier Zanetti, on 5 August before the two meet supporters ahead of the Derby della Madonnina. The precinct will also host a major pre-match fan party ahead of the Derby d'Italia, while an official merchandise pop-up shop will be open from 3 to 11 August. On 7 August, Inter will host an open training session at Optus Stadium from 4:30pm.

Juventus fans will be based at The Ice Cream Factory in Northbridge, which will transform into Casa Juventus ("Juventus House") from 5 to 11 August. The official fan house will feature club content, supporter activations, food and drink, and opportunities for fans to gather. It will complement the free Little Italy Festival at Stadium Park outside Optus Stadium, which will also feature a panel featuring Italian footballing greats. Juventus will also host an open training session at Optus Stadium on 7 August from 6:30pm. Fans will also have another gathering point at Crown Perth, with an official pre-match party at The Merrywell from 3:30pm on 8 August, which will include face painting, disc jockeys and appearances from club legends before the Derby d'Italia. Crown Sports Bar will also host a live Juventus and Palermo question and answer session from 5:30pm on 10 August.

Palermo fans will be based at Gage Roads Brew Co in Palmyra, which will transform into Casa Sicilia ("Sicily House") from 5 to 10 August ahead of the series and the Anglo-Palermitan Trophy, part of Palermo's first ever Australian tour. The opening night will feature appearances from Palermo legends, a live question and answer session, Sicilian food and drink, and a disc jockey, followed by the revealing of Palermo's Zagara kit (inspired by the orange blossom, a Sicilian symbol), a cooking demonstration, player appearances and Sicilian food activation the following evening. The fan night on 8 August will feature Italian music and a live screening of the Derby d'Italia, while the closing night will feature club stories, community recognition, tour footage and farewell appearances.

== Venues ==
Perth
Optus Stadium	HBF Park
Capacity: 60,000	Capacity: 19,500

== Controversies ==
The Western Australian Government's undisclosed amount of spending on the event drew criticism. Premier Roger Cook refused to state the price taxpayers would pay for the event, which was reported to be at around $11 million Australian dollars. Opposition Leader Basil Zempilas criticised Cook for refusing to disclose the event's price tag, pledging to disclose the price of any government-funded events if the Liberal-National Coalition was elected in 2029. Deputy Premier, Treasurer and Sport and Recreation Minister Rita Saffioti also refused to disclose how much the event costed, though denied that the cost was as high as $12 million.

The state government also announced it would subsidise airfares for attendees travelling from interstate, with the government entering a sponsorship arrangement with Virgin Australia for $189 one-way flights to Perth from Adelaide, Brisbane, Melbourne and Sydney. Zempilas criticised the move, referring to it as "outrageous", leading to Labor Party accused Zempilas of hypocrisy after he was a passenger on the inaugural flight from Perth to Rome, which was also government-subsidised. Shadow Minister for Transport Steve Martin criticised the government of double standards after the government had previously announced airfare hikes due to the regional airfare zone cap. Columnist Paul Murray wrote an opinion piece in The West Australian criticising the government's lack of transparency over the event's cost as well as the subsidising of interstate airfares. He also accused Saffioti of hosting the event due to being a soccer fan and of Italian descent, further noting that the Italy national team failed to qualify for their third straight FIFA World Cup earlier in the year and that England's Premier League is considered the world's best league.

After slower-than-expected ticket sales, the state government moved the fixture between Juventus and Palermo from Optus Stadium to the smaller HBF Park. The decision prompted further criticism from Zempilas, accusing his government of wasting taxpayer money.
