= Christ Reformed Episcopal Church =

Christ Reformed Episcopal Church may refer to:

- Christ Reformed Episcopal Church (Chicago), built c. 1860 and demolished in 1920
- Christ Memorial Reformed Episcopal Church (Philadelphia), built in 1888 and demolished in 2018
