= E. E. Hutton House =

Historic house in West Virginia, United States

- U.S. National Register of Historic Places
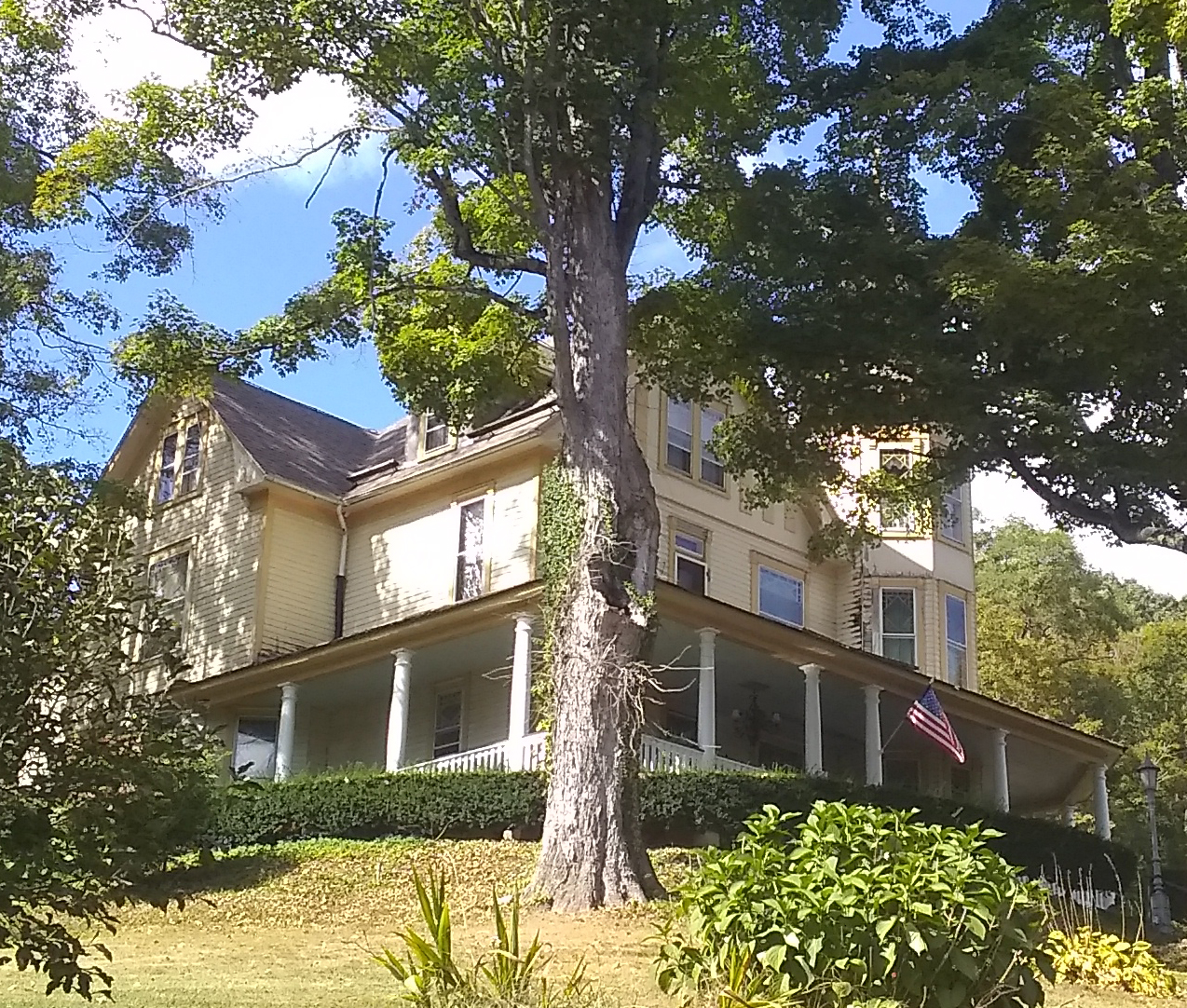

- Location within West Virginia Location within the United States
- Location: Junction of U.S. Routes 219 and 250, Union St., Huttonsville, West Virginia
- Coordinates: 38°42′56″N 79°58′45″W
- Area: 2 acres (0.81 ha)
- Built: 1898
- Architectural style: Queen Anne
- NRHP reference No.: 75001898
- Added to NRHP: June 11, 1975

E. E. Hutton House, also known as The Place Called Hutton, is a historic home located at Huttonsville, Randolph County, in the U.S. state of West Virginia. It was built in 1898, and is a 2½-story, cross-shaped residence in the Queen Anne style. It has a hipped and gable roof broken by dormers and a three-story octagonal tower. It features a deep, one-story wraparound porch. It was built by Eugene Elihu Hutton, Sr., a great-grandson of Jonathan Hutton, namesake of Huttonsville.

It was listed on the National Register of Historic Places in 1975.
