= Tygarts Valley Church =

Historic church in West Virginia, United States

- U.S. National Register of Historic Places
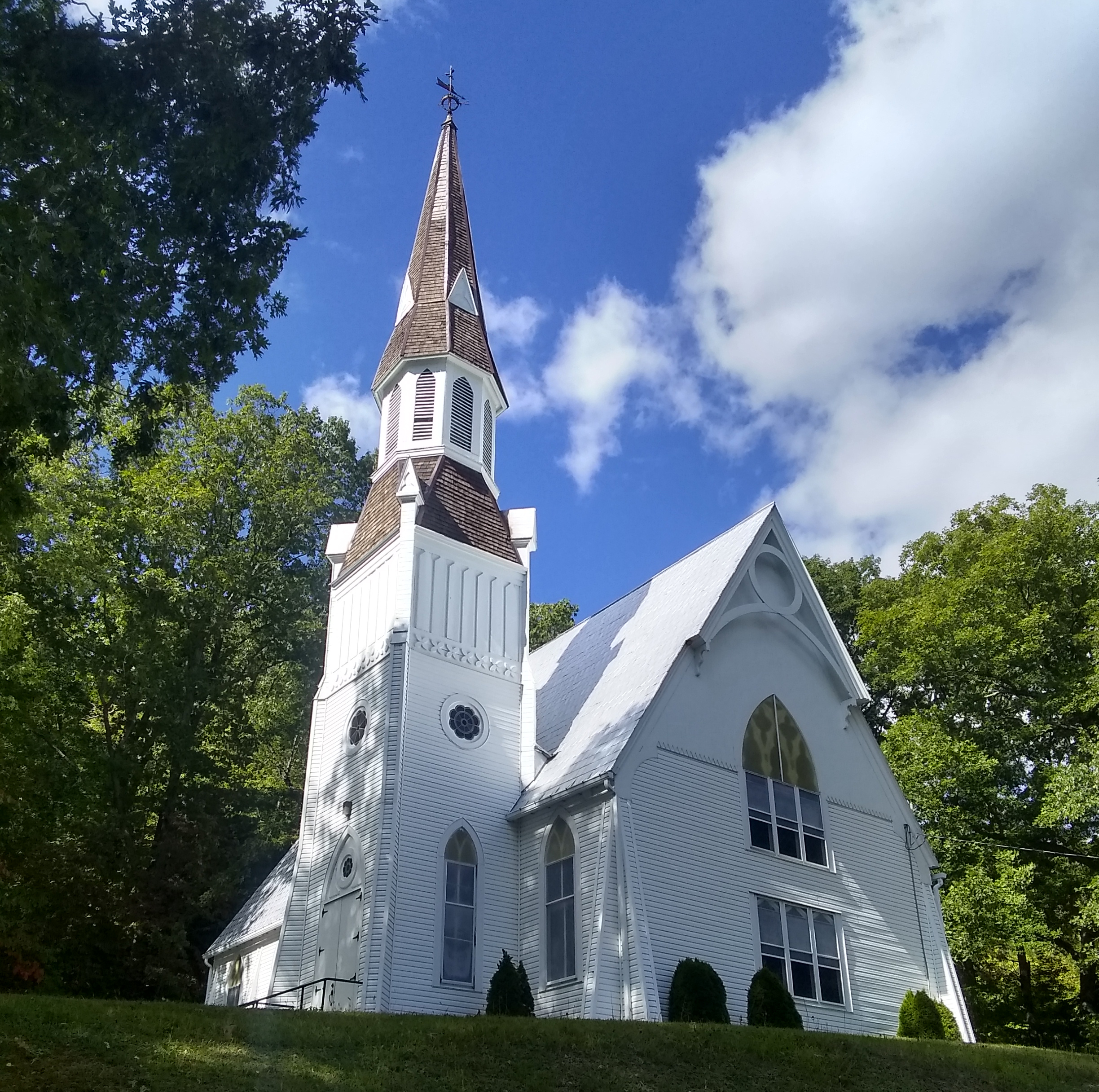

- Location within West Virginia Location within the United States
- Location: U.S. Routes 219/250; Huttonsville, West Virginia
- Coordinates: 38°43′04″N 79°58′39″W
- Area: 1 acre (0.40 ha)
- Built: 1883
- Architect: Isaac Pursell; Chenowith, Lemuel
- Architectural style: Gothic
- NRHP reference No.: 86000797
- Added to NRHP: April 15, 1986

Tygarts Valley Church, also known as Tygarts Valley Presbyterian Church, is a Presbyterian church on U.S. Routes 219/250 in Huttonsville, Randolph County, West Virginia. It was built in 1883 in a wooden Gothic Revival architectural style on a sandstone foundation. The church measures 61 by 31 feet (18.6 by 9.4 m) and features a 105-foot-tall (32 m) spire.

It was listed on the National Register of Historic Places in 1986.

The Philadelphia architectural firm of Isaac Purcell designed the building. Bridge builder Lemuel Chenoweth was responsible for the construction. The colorful windows, are rolled cathedral glass, imported from Scotland.
