= Partners for Sacred Places =

- Founded: 1989; 37 years ago
- Location(s): 1700 Sansom Street, 10th Floor Philadelphia, Pennsylvania 19103
- Website: www.sacredplaces.org

Partners for Sacred Places is an American non-sectarian, non-profit organization whose mission is the support of older and historic sacred places by helping congregations and local communities sustain and actively use the structures.

Founded in 1989, Partners has helped several thousand congregations and other local organizations protect their community-serving sacred places in towns and cities across America. Between 2016 and 2024, it awarded $26 million to help preserve religious structures, aided by funding from foundations like the Lilly Endowment.

Partners works with the National Trust for Historic Preservation to help communities through the process of figuring out how to adapt historically religious properties, including for new uses, and retain them as important anchors and architectural landmarks.

== Partial list of projects ==
- Mother Bethel A.M.E. Church
- St. Francis de Sales Church, Philadelphia
- Third Presbyterian Church (Chester, Pennsylvania)
- Touro Synagogue

== See also ==
- Historic preservation
- Architectural history
- America's Most Endangered Places
- Oldest synagogues in the United States
