= Vacation Bible school =

Christian children's education

Vacation Bible School, or VBS, is a term usually used to represent a week-long religious event in the summer, aimed toward children and pre-teens.

== History ==
The origins of Vacation Bible School can be traced back to Hopedale, Illinois in 1894. Sunday school teacher D. T. Miles, who also was a public school teacher, felt that she was limited by time constraints in teaching the Bible to children, so she started a daily Bible school to teach children during the summer. The first Bible school enrolled 40 students and lasted four weeks. A local school was used for classes, while an adjoining park was used for recess.

In 1898, Virginia Sinclair Hawes (often identified as "Mrs. Walker Aylett Hawes"), director of the children's department at Epiphany Baptist Church in New York City, started an "Everyday Bible School" for neighborhood children during the summer at a rented beer parlor in New York's East Side. There is a bronze plaque honoring her efforts located in her hometown of Charlottesville, Virginia, in the foyer of First Baptist Church.

Robert Boville of the Baptist Mission Society became aware of the Hawes' summer program and recommended it to other Baptist churches. Boville established a handful of summer schools which were taught by students at the Union Theological Seminary. During one summer, 1,000 students were enrolled in five different schools. In 1922, he founded the World Association of Daily Vacation Bible School.

One year later, Standard Publishing produced the very first printed VBS curriculum. Enough material was provided for a five-week course for three age levels (kindergarten, primary and junior).

While not under the title of Vacation Bible School, Dr. Abraham L. Latham of the Third Presbyterian Church in Chester, Pennsylvania, initiated a five-week, four hour per day summer Bible school in 1912 which, at its peak, had 650–700 students. This has been claimed to be the world's first summer Bible school.

=== Modern programs ===
Many churches run their own Vacation Bible School programs without being under the umbrella of a national organization. Some churches opt to use themed curriculum programs from their respective denominations or independent publishing houses which provide easy preparation and include marketing tools.

Modern programs usually consist of a week-long program of religious education which may employ Bible stories, religious songs, arts and crafts, skits or puppet shows which cater toward elementary schoolers.

Most churches provide VBS programs at no cost to those attending, though some may charge a fee for the program.

Studies indicate that VBS is on the decline. Barna Research found that 81% of U.S. churches offered VBS in 1997, while only 68% did so in 2012.
