= St. John's Episcopal Church (Charleston, West Virginia) =

Historic church in West Virginia, United States

- U.S. National Register of Historic Places
- U.S. Historic district – Contributing property
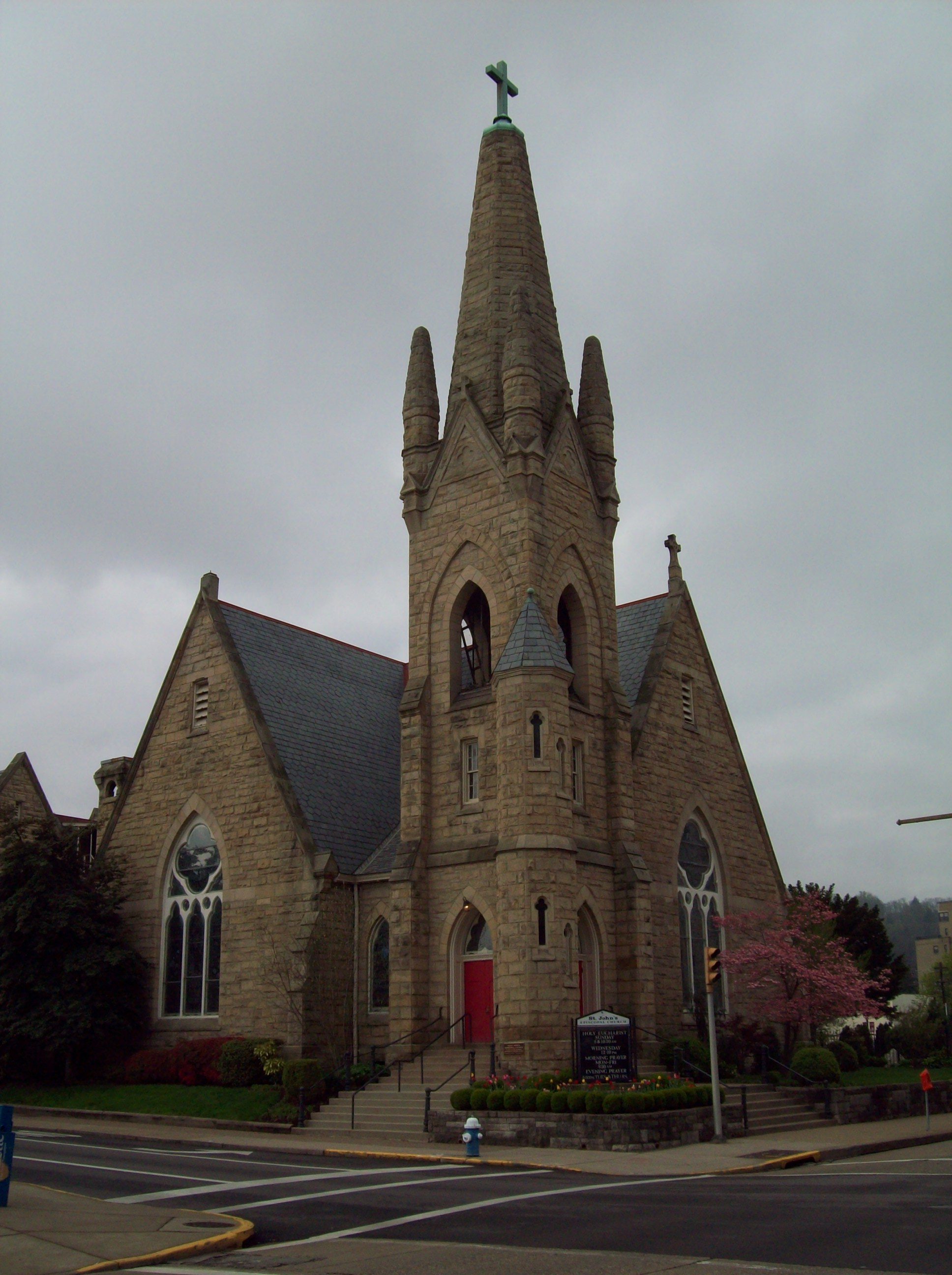
- St. John's Episcopal Church, April 2009

- Location within West Virginia Location within the United States
- Location: 1105 Quarrier Street; Charleston, West Virginia
- Coordinates: 38°20′49.23″N 81°37′55.73″W
- Built: 1884
- Architect: Isaac Pursell; Warne, Tucker, Silling & Hutchison
- Architectural style: Late Gothic Revival
- NRHP reference No.: 89001782
- Added to NRHP: November 2, 1989

St. John's Episcopal Church is an historic Episcopal church located at 1105 Quarrier Street in Charleston, West Virginia, in the United States. On November 2, 1989, it was added to the National Register of Historic Places. It was also listed as a contributing property in the Downtown Charleston Historic District in 2006.

St. John's Episcopal Church is an active parish in the Episcopal Diocese of West Virginia. Its rector is the Very Rev. Eric L. Miller. In 2017, the church reported 416 members; in 2023, it reported 191 members. No membership statistics were reported in 2024 national parochial reports. Plate and pledge financial support reported by the church in 2024 was $281,866. Average Sunday Attendance (ASA) reported in 2024 was 79 persons. This was a relative decrease from ASA of 111 reported in 2016.

== National Register listing ==
- St. John's Episcopal Church ** (added 1989 - Building - #89001782)
- 1105 Quarrier St., Charleston
- Historic Significance: Person, Event, Architecture/Engineering
- Architect, builder, or engineer: Pursell, Isaac, Warne, Tucker, Silling & Hutchison
- Architectural Style: Late Gothic Revival
- Historic Person: Laidley, Alexander T.
- Significant Year: 1890, 1928, 1884
- Area of Significance: Architecture, Religion
- Period of Significance: 1875–1899, 1900–1924, 1925–1949
- Owner: Private
- Historic Function: Religion
- Historic Sub-function: Religious Structure
- Current Function: Religion, Social
- Current Sub-function: Civic, Religious Structure

== See also ==
- List of Registered Historic Places in West Virginia
- St. John's Episcopal Church (disambiguation)
