= Fort Marrow =

- U.S. National Register of Historic Places
- Location within West Virginia Location within the United States
- Location: North corner U.S. Route 219 and County Route 219/16, near Huttonsville, West Virginia
- Coordinates: 38°38′00″N 80°01′21″W
- Area: 8 acres (3.2 ha)
- Built: 1861
- NRHP reference No.: 10000511
- Added to NRHP: July 30, 2010

Fort Marrow is a historic American Civil War fort and archaeological site located near Huttonsville, Randolph County, West Virginia. It was built by the Union Army as part of the defenses for Camp Elkwater. It is a seven-sided, enclosed earthen redoubt. Associated with it is a nearby tent / hut site, now represented by 10 depressions in the earth.

It was listed on the National Register of Historic Places in 2010.
