= Huttonsville State Farm Wildlife Management Area =

State Wildlife Management Area in Randolph County, West Virginia

- IUCN category V (protected landscape/seascape)
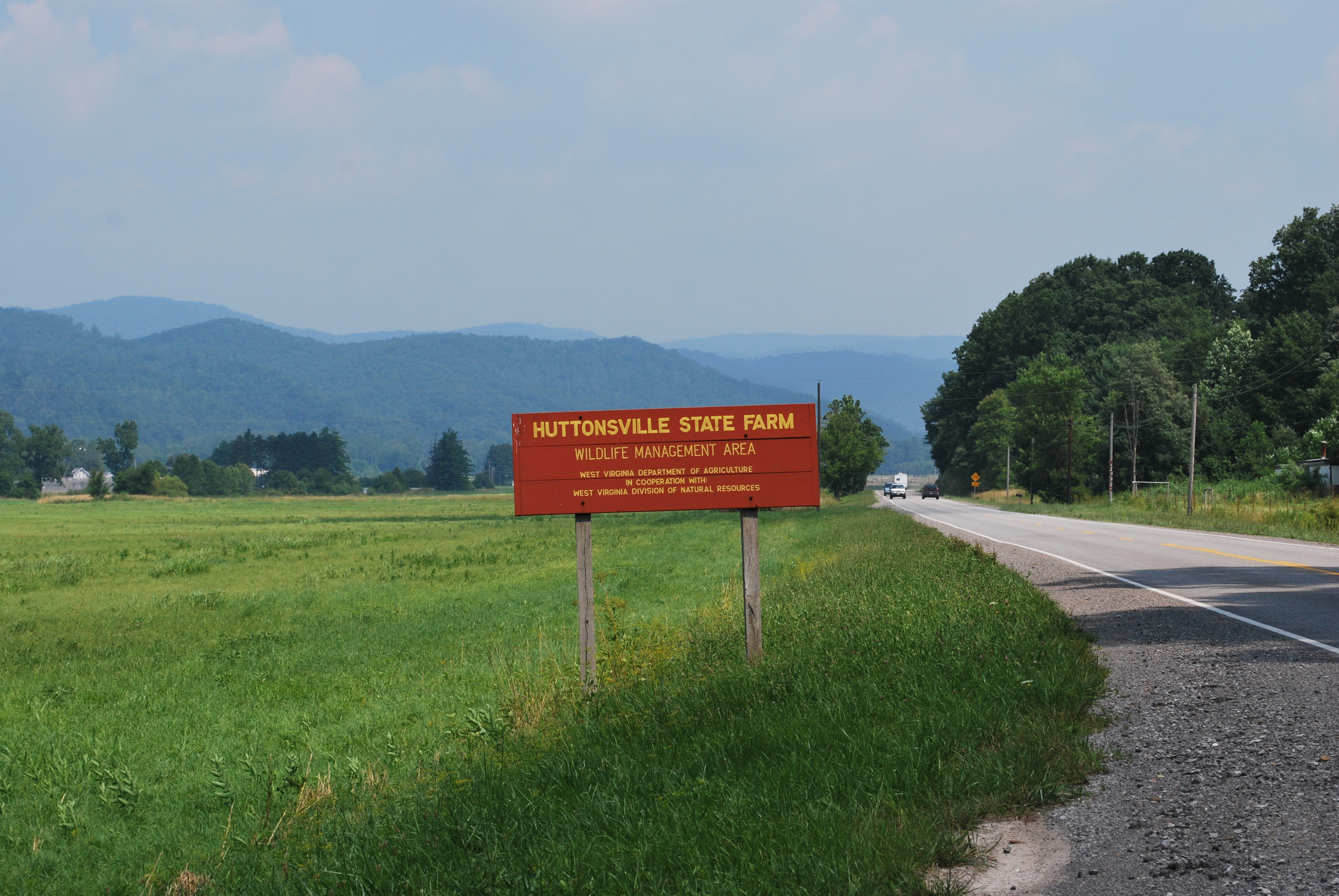
- Sign for the Huttonsville State Farm along US 250.

- Location within West Virginia
- Location: Randolph, West Virginia, United States
- Coordinates: 38°42′16″N 79°58′44″W
- Area: 2,720 acres (11.0 km^{2})
- Elevation: 2,024 ft (617 m)
- Operator: West Virginia Division of Natural Resources, Wildlife Resources Section
- Website: WVDNR District 3 Wildlife Management Areas

Huttonsville State Farm Wildlife Management Area is located on 2,720 acres (1,100 ha) southeast of Huttonsville in Randolph County, West Virginia. The wildlife management area is centered on the Huttonsville Correctional Center, a West Virginia state prison.
