= Third Presbyterian Church (Chester, Pennsylvania) =

Coordinates: 39.8546°N 75.3565°W

- U.S. National Register of Historic Places
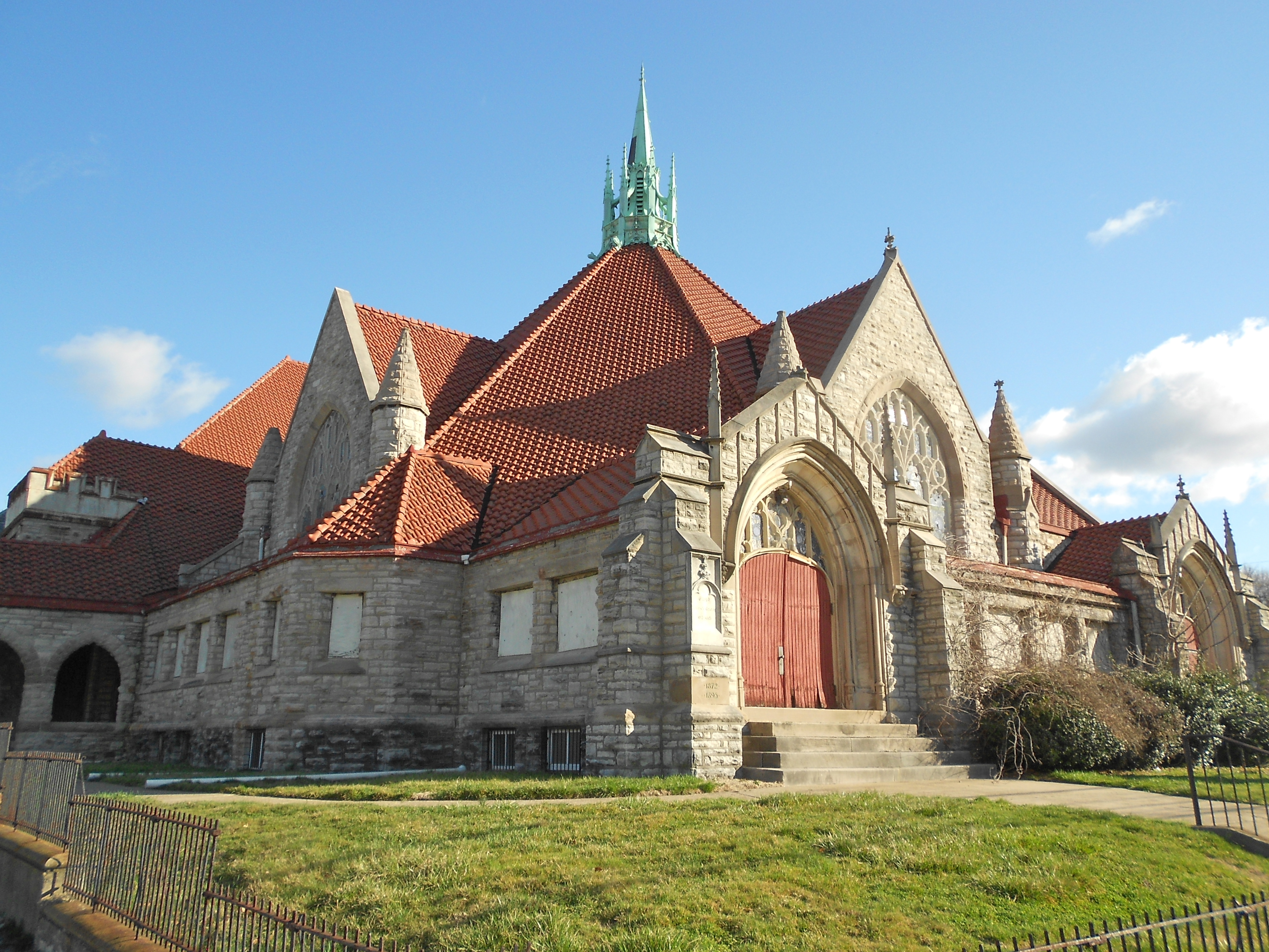
- Third Presbyterian Church in 2015

- Location within Pennsylvania Location within the United States
- Location: 9th and Potter St., Chester, Pennsylvania
- Built: 1872
- Architect: Isaac Pursell
- Architectural style: Gothic Revival
- NRHP reference No.: 10004702
- Added to NRHP: November 26, 2019

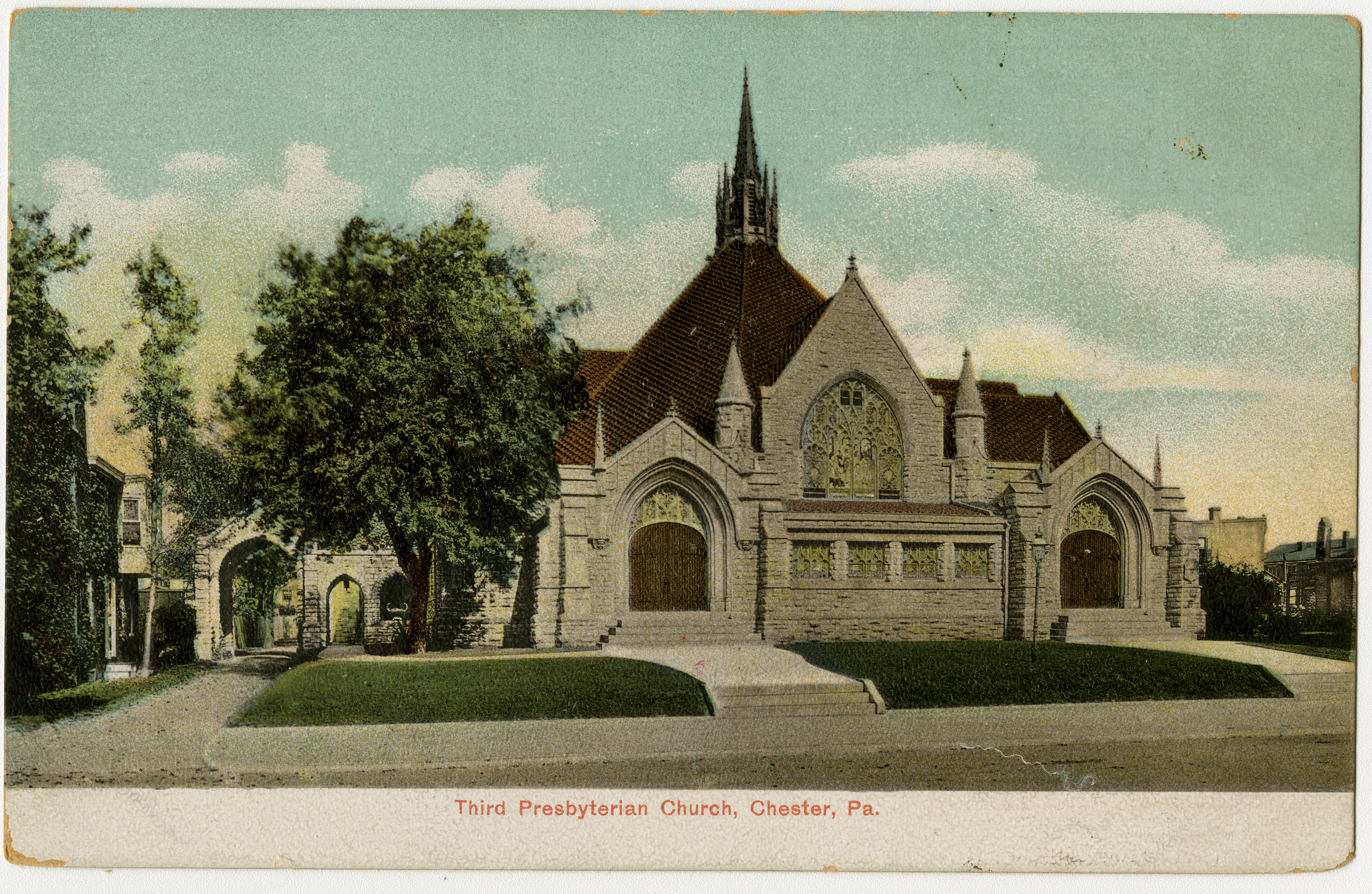
Third Presbyterian Church depicted on a postcard

The Third Presbyterian Church was a historic Presbyterian Church founded in 1872 in Chester, Pennsylvania. It was located at 9th and Potter Streets. The church was the location of the first summer bible school in 1912. The congregation closed in 1986 and was thereafter owned by the Chester Historical Preservation Committee. It was a stone Gothic Revival building designed by the noted Philadelphia architect Isaac Pursell. The church was listed on the National Register of Historic Places in November 2019 but severely damaged by a five-alarm fire on May 28, 2020.

== History ==
The Third Presbyterian Church was built as a memorial to commemorate the reunion of the Old and New School Churches. It was originally located on the southwest corner of Twelfth and Upland Streets. The lot was purchased in 1871 and a brick building was erected as a mission Sunday school of the now defunct First Presbyterian Church. A division in the congregation occurred and 42 members broke off from the First Presbyterian Church and formed the Third Presbyterian Church on October 16, 1872. In July 1873, the western end of the church was removed, twenty-five feet added in length and a recess pulpit added.

Dr. Abraham L. Latham, the minister of the Third Presbyterian Church, was concerned about declining church enrollment numbers and the lethargy of the congregation. He designed the first bible summer school with a five-week program for four hours each day for young people on summer vacation. The first school opened in 1912. At its peak, approximately 650 to 700 students participated in the summer bible school.

Mel Trotter, the American fundamentalism leader, held a two-week church campaign at the Third Presbyterian Church in the 1920s which resulted in 400 conversions.

The congregation peaked in the middle of the 20th century but began to decline as Chester experienced economic and demographic shifts in the 1970s and 1980s. The Third Presbyterian Church was unable to survive this difficult period and closed their doors in 1986.

The Chester Eastside Ministries, a social service organization affiliated with the Presbytery of Philadelphia occupied the building next until 2013 when the building was found structurally unsound and too expensive to maintain. The Chester Eastside Ministries organization moved to St. Paul's Church across the street. A permit was submitted to the city for demolition, however the Chester Historical Preservation Committee intervened and in 2015 purchased the building for $1. The committee hoped to rent the Sunday school rooms as office space and use the sanctuary as a theater.

The Chester Historical Preservation Committee worked with Partners for Sacred Places, the national, non-sectarian, non-profit organization whose mission is to support older and historic sacred places, to restore the Third Presbyterian Church.

== May 2020 fire ==
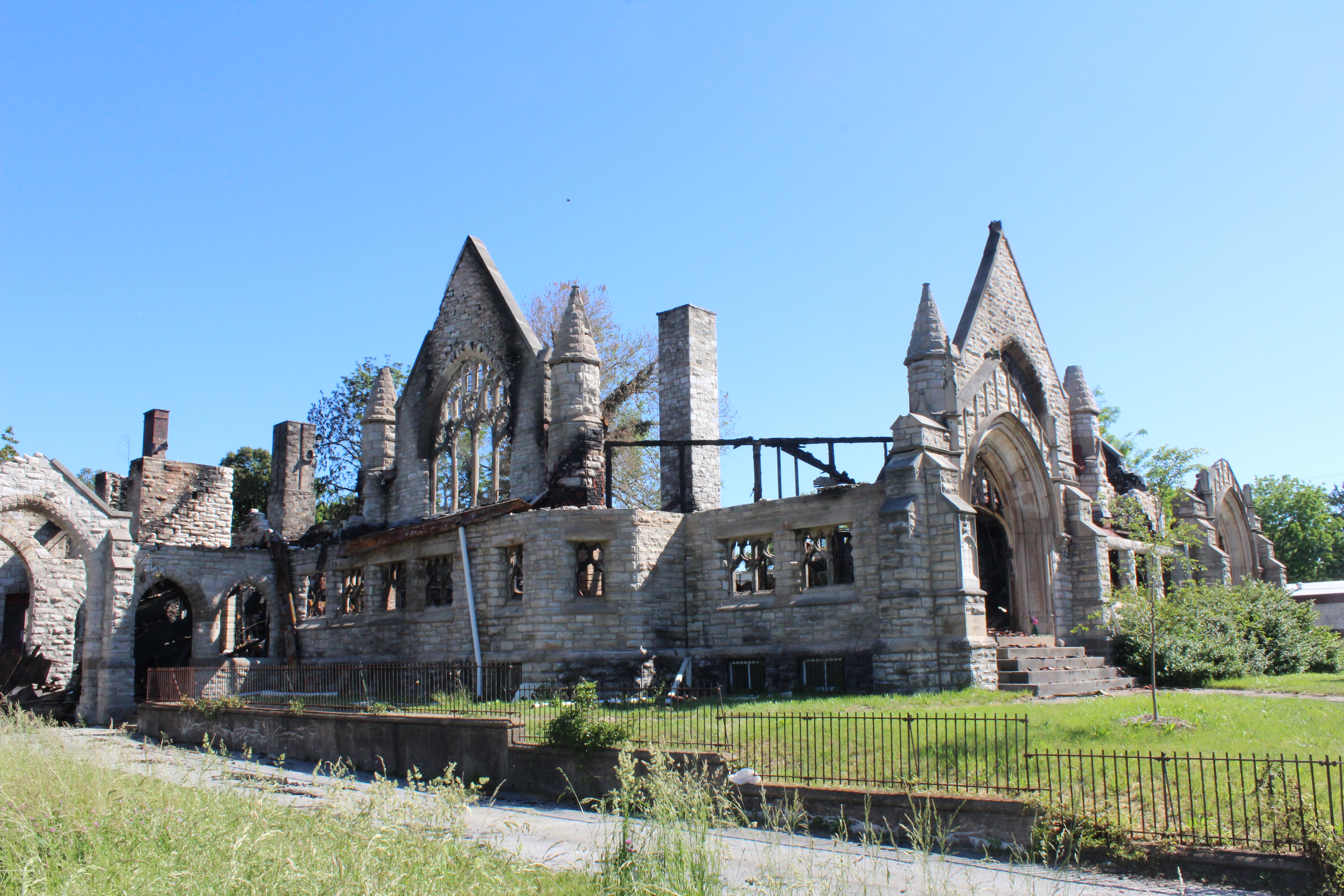
Third Presbyterian Church after May 2020 fire

The church was severely damaged by a five-alarm fire during the early hours of May 28, 2020. There were no injuries or fatalities reported and The Bureau of Alcohol Tobacco, Firearms and Explosives was called to investigate the fire. Due to its vacancy and lack of electricity hookup, members of the Chester Historic Preservation Committee considered it to be a suspicious fire.

== Notable members ==
- Everett F. Harrison, was pastor at the Third Presbyterian Church from 1940 to 1944
- John B. Hinkson, lawyer, businessman and 6th mayor of Chester, was a member of the church and served as an elder and trustee
