= Herman S. Hoffman =

American Reformed Episcopalian bishop (1841–1912)

The Right Reverend Herman S. Hoffman D.D.
- Bishop of the Synod of Canada
- Herman S. Hoffman
- Church: Reformed Episcopal Church
- See: Synod of Canada
- Appointed: 1903
- Other posts: Assistant bishop, New York and Philadelphia Synod

Orders
- Ordination: 1864 (Moravian Church)
- Consecration: June 3, 1903 (REC) by Samuel Fallows

Personal details
- Born: June 9, 1841 Salem, North Carolina, United States
- Died: November 23, 1912 (aged 71) Philadelphia, Pennsylvania, United States
- Buried: Bethlehem, Pennsylvania, United States
- Spouse: Eliza Looney (m. 1872, d. 1892); Laura Goldsmith (m. 1902)
- Education: Moravian Theological Seminary

Herman S. Hoffman (June 9, 1841 – November 23, 1912) was an American Reformed Episcopalian bishop. He began his ordained ministry in the Moravian Church. He and his Philadelphia congregation were received into the Reformed Episcopal Church (REC) in 1881. Hoffman's first wife, Eliza Looney Hoffman, was wealthy, which allowed her husband to serve in ministry without taking a salary.

In the REC, Hoffman was involved in debates over the suitability of vestments. He favored the academic gown over choir dress, and supported a successful resolution at the church's 1897 general council that prohibited the adoption of choir dress in congregations that did not already use it. Eliza Hoffman died in 1898, leaving her wealth to Herman.

Hoffman became a bishop of the REC in 1903 to oversee churches in Canada and later became an assistant bishop in the New York and Philadelphia Synod. He experienced ill health later in life and died in 1912. His will left $500,000 ($16.7 million in 2025) in charitable bequests, the bulk of which went to the Looney-Hoffman Fund, which provided loans at nominal interest rates to support REC church extension work and building projects in Pennsylvania. Hoffman conditioned loans from the fund on churches prohibiting the use of choir dress in their services, extending his influence on the vestments controversy after his death.

== Early life, education and early ministry ==
Hoffman was born near Salem, North Carolina, in 1841. He received his theological education at Moravian Theological Seminary and was ordained in the Moravian Church in 1864. He was responsible for founding several Moravian churches, including the Second, Third, Fourth, Fifth, and Holy Trinity churches.

== Marriages ==
In 1872, Hoffman married to Eliza Looney. Looney was wealthy, allowing Hoffman to serve in ministry without a salary. She left him a considerable fortune upon her death in 1898. An REC mission station in Bansi, Uttar Pradesh, was named in her memory.

He remarried in 1902 to Laura Goldsmith, a widow 27 years his junior. Goldsmith was a nurse who had cared for troops on the battlefield during the Spanish-American War, and they met when Hoffman was seeking a nurse to serve on the mission field in India.

== Reformed Episcopal Church ==
An artist's rendering of Christ Memorial Reformed Episcopal Church in Philadelphia

Hoffman was received into the Reformed Episcopal Church in 1881 along with his entire Philadelphia congregation. He also founded Christ Memorial Reformed Episcopal Church in 1885.

Within the REC, Hoffman vociferously opposed the traditional Anglican choir dress of the cassock and surplice and supported the passage at the church's 1897 general council of a resolution mandating that REC clergy wear the academic gown instead of choir dress, with exceptions for local congregations and bishops whose practice already included the use of choir dress. Hoffman also served on the faculty of Reformed Episcopal Seminary. Hoffman was active in a variety of REC-related activities, contributing to the denomination's hymnal and serving as manager of its Episcopal Recorder publication, secretary of the Church Extension Trust and president of the Board of Foreign Missions. He was named a life trustee of Christ Memorial Church and of Reformed Episcopal Seminary in recognition of his services to those institutions.

He was elected a bishop of the REC in 1903 and consecrated by Presiding Bishop Samuel Fallows on June 3 of that year at Church of the Redeemer. Hoffman was assigned to the Synod of Canada (while remaining based in Philadelphia). He visited REC mission stations in India during his first year as a bishop, and two years later was named an assistant bishop in the New York and Philadelphia Synod. Due to his first wife's wealth, Hoffman did not accept a salary from a church during his lifetime.

== Later life, death and legacy ==
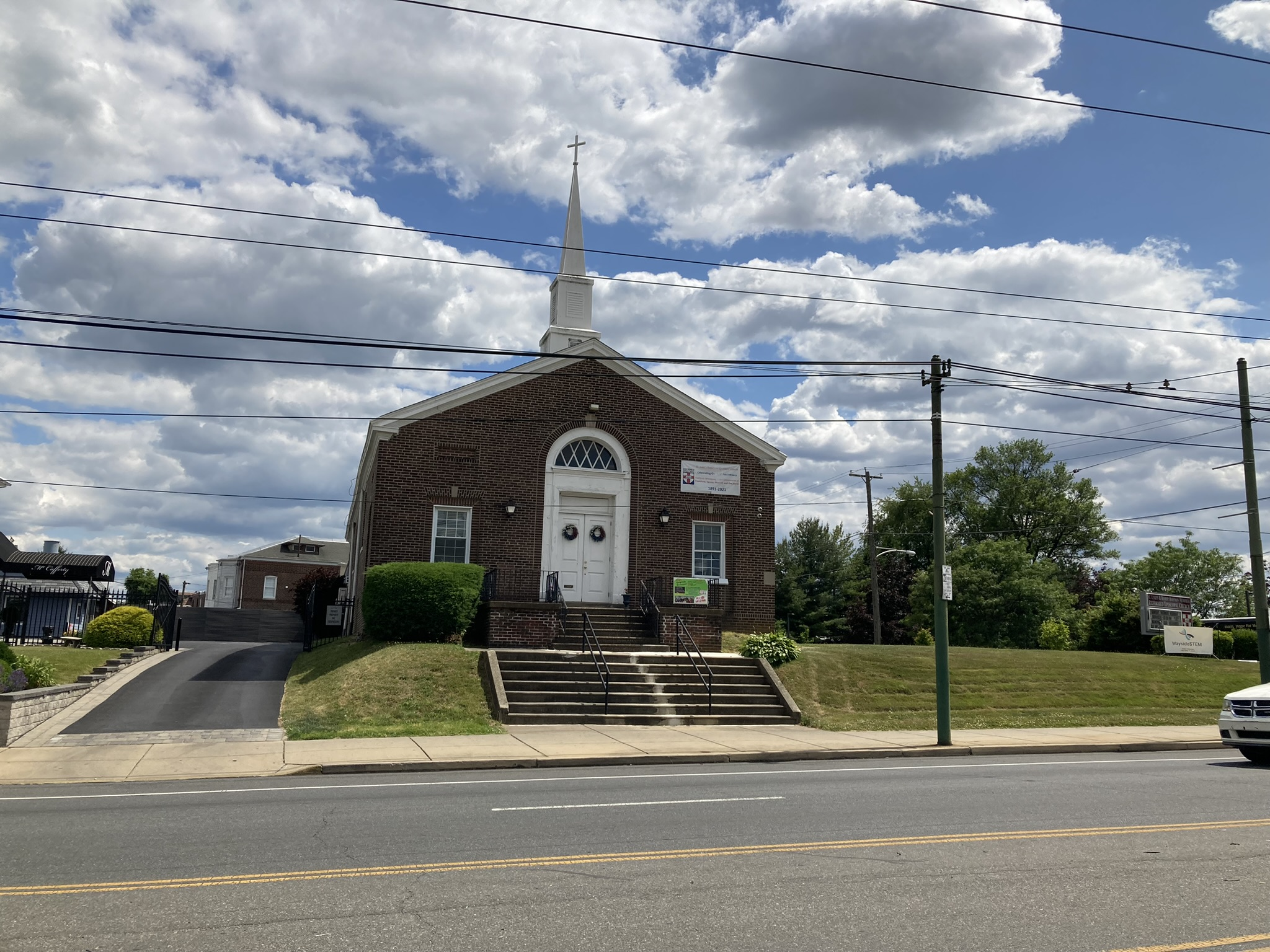
St. Luke's-Bishop Hoffman Memorial Reformed Episcopal Church (1934) in Philadelphia

Hoffman retired from episcopal duties in 1909. In 1910, he canceled $12,400 ($428,464 in 2025) in mortgage debt that he held on the building of Church of the Redeemer.

Hoffman's health had been deteriorating for several years, and it worsened in fall of 1911, when the team of horses pulling his victoria carriage bolted after an automobile driver knocked the Hoffman's coachman out of his seat. Following a long illness, Hoffman died of heart disease on November 23, 1912. Funeral services were held at the Church of the Redeemer, and he was buried in Bethlehem.

In his will, Hoffman left $500,000 in charitable bequests. He set aside a $100,000 trust, the interest of which would care for his widow before reverting to the estate. Hoffman made specific bequests for REC publications and its two church missions in India, as well as $25,000 to build a Kensington branch of the YWCA. The remainder of his estate formed the Looney-Hoffman Fund for REC church growth and facilities expansion in Pennsylvania.

The Looney-Hoffman Fund provided loans at nominal interest rates for new REC church buildings, provided the churches that borrowed money from the fund adhered to the resolution of the 1897 general council requiring the academic gown instead of choir dress. According to historian Allen C. Guelzo, "by dangling the prospect of unlimited free money in front of struggling parishes and vestries, Hoffman hoped to out-bid, rather than out-debate, the hapless partisans of cassock and surplice." As of 2026, the Looney-Hoffman Fund was administered by the Diocese of the Northeast and Mid-Atlantic (successor to the New York and Philadelphia Synod) and had nearly $5.9 million in assets, of which $2.6 million comprised loans to REC congregations.

In 1934, the cornerstone was laid for the Bishop Hoffman Memorial Church in the Tacony area of Philadelphia.

== Works ==
- Hoffman, Herman S. (1900). Life Beyond the Grave. St. Louis: St. Louis Christian Advocate Co.
- Hoffman, Herman S. (1912). The Gift of Suffering. New York: Eaton & Mains.
