= Huttonsville Correctional Center =

State prison in West Virginia, United States

Coordinates: 38°41′40″N 79°58′49″W

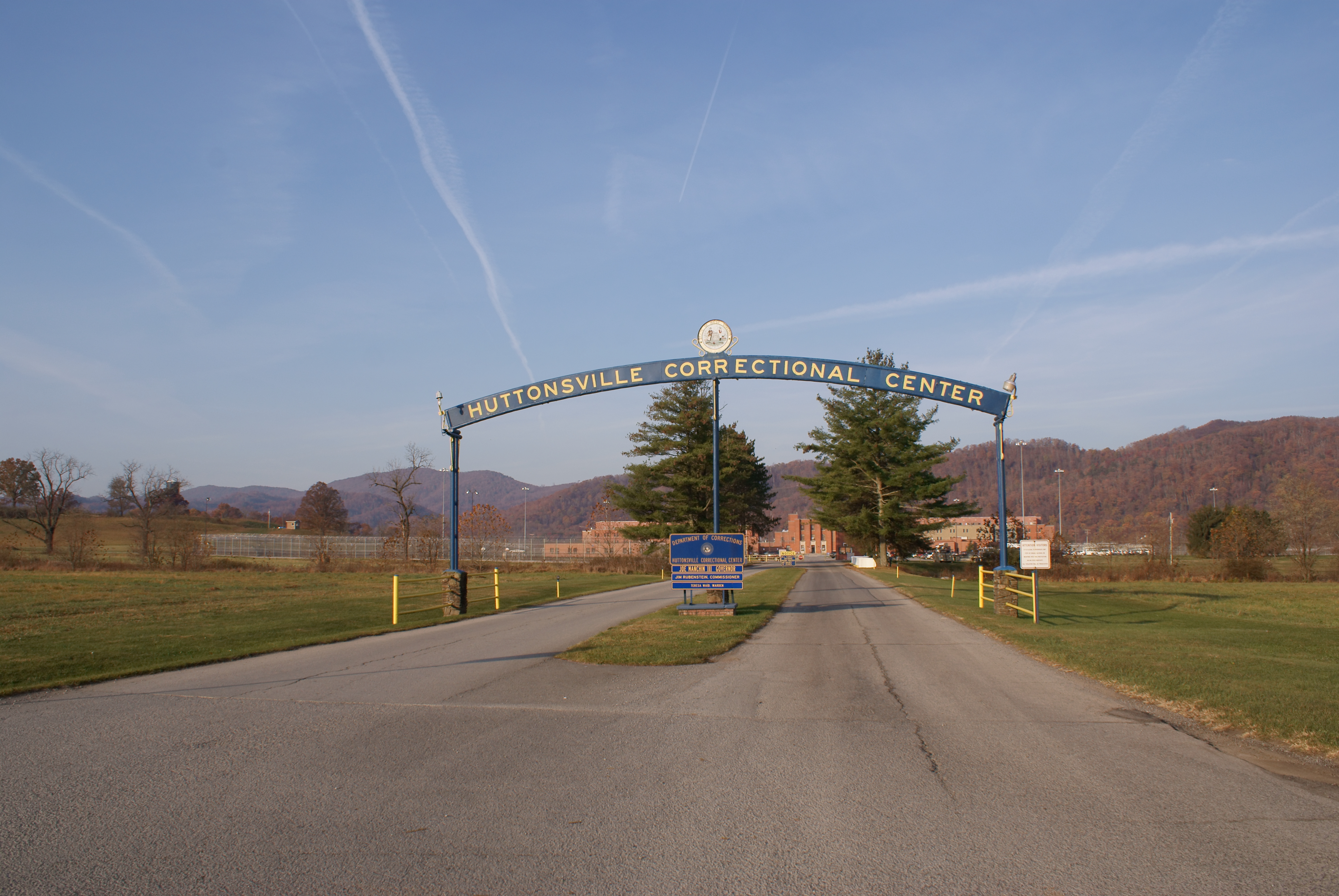
- Interactive map of Huttonsville Correctional Center
- Location: US-250 Huttonsville, West Virginia
- Status: open
- Security class: close
- Capacity: 1186
- Opened: 1939
- Managed by: West Virginia Division of Corrections and Rehabilitation

Huttonsville Correctional Center is a prison located near Huttonsville in Randolph County, West Virginia. It was created by an act of the Legislature in 1937 to relieve overcrowding at the West Virginia State Penitentiary. It remained a branch of the parent institution until 1947, at which time the Legislature established it as a separate entity – the West Virginia Medium Security Prison. In 1970, the center received its current name by legislative act. Huttonsville Correctional Center has been in operation since 1939 and is the oldest facility in the state.

With recently completed construction, the capacity of the Huttonsville Correctional Center is 1,186. Living quarters at this facility consist of military style dormitories in the original building and single/multi-cell housing in the new units. A Segregation Unit known as "The Hole" and an Intake Unit were established upon the opening of the new additions, which houses 120 single cells. Huttonsville Correctional Center is one of the largest employers in Randolph County with a Staff of 383.

There are many educational programs, both vocational and academic, offered to inmates by The State Department Of Education. These classes give them an opportunity to engage in rehabilitation efforts during their incarceration. Inmates are able to attend classes in the Adult Basic Education Program to work towards or obtain GED certificates. Vocational Courses offered includes Auto Mechanics, Auto Body, Welding, Machine Shop, Carpentry, Masonry, Electrical, and Computer Lab.

Prison Industries operate the Braille Program and Furniture plant located at Huttonsville. In 1987, the prison acquired a computerized braille production system. Regular textbooks are transcribed into Braille and distributed throughout the United States. The furniture plant refinishes and builds new furniture for various agencies.

The original focus of the prison was as a labor-intensive general-purpose farm. In 1977 the 5,000-acre (20 km^{2}) farm was turned over to the state Farm Management Commission and converted to a beef cattle operation, and the majority of inmates were transferred to other work. Today inmates work on the cattle farm, in a furniture plant, automotive parts shop, and welding shop. The prison is the largest transcriber of textbooks into Braille in the United States, accounting for almost 90% of the Braille textbooks.

In 2012, the Huttonsville Work Camp opened beside the prison to reduce overcrowding and to provide a better transition for prisoners to a lower security setting.

The current capacity of the prison is 1183. The majority of inmates live in barracks-style housing, but two new 120-inmate cell units were opened in 2000.

== See also ==
- Huttonsville State Farm Wildlife Management Area
