= Brouilletts Creek Covered Bridge =

- Formerly listed on the U.S. National Register of Historic Places
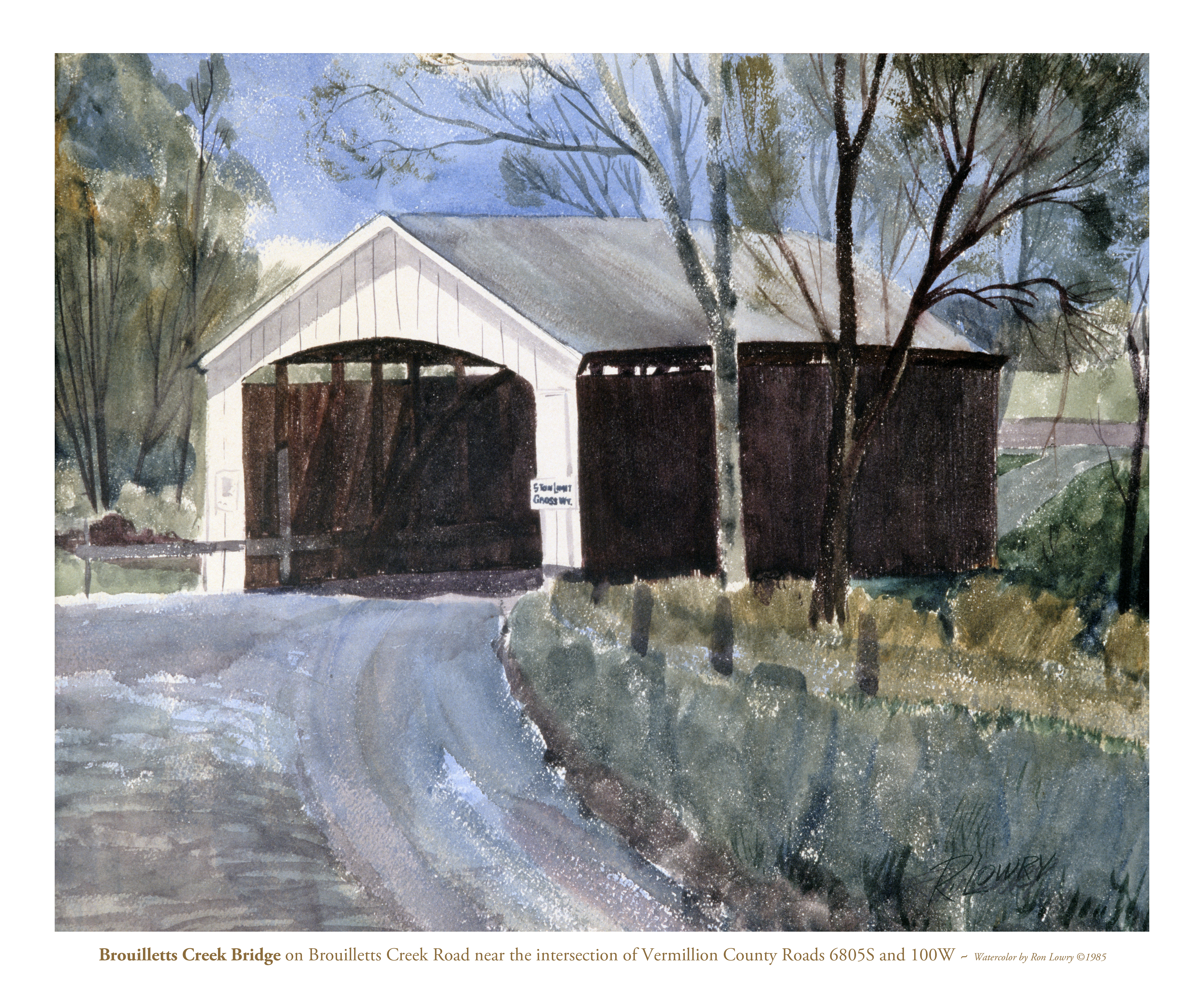
- Brouilletts Creek Bridge, watercolor painting by Ron Lowry, 1985

- Location within Indiana
- Location: County Roads 100W and 1700S over Brouilletts Creek, Clinton, Indiana
- Area: less than one acre
- Built: 1879
- Built by: Daniels, Joseph J.
- Architectural style: Burr Arch Truss
- NRHP reference No.: 94000586

Significant dates
- Added to NRHP: June 10, 1994
- Removed from NRHP: June 2, 1999

Brouilletts Creek Covered Bridge, also known as S Hill Covered Bridge and Furnace Road Bridge, was a historic Burr Arch Truss covered bridge located at Clinton, Indiana. It was built in 1879, and is a single span covered timber bridge. It measured 157 feet long. The bridge was disassembled in 1994 and currently in storage in its entirety for reassembly in the future.

It was listed on the National Register of Historic Places in 1994 and delisted in 1999.

== See also ==
- Eugene Covered Bridge
- Newport Covered Bridge
- Possum Bottom Covered Bridge
