= Eugene Township, Vermillion County, Indiana =

Eugene Township
- Township
- Location in Vermillion County
- Coordinates: 39°57′32″N 87°28′26″W
- Country: United States
- State: Indiana
- County: Vermillion

Government
  - Type: Indiana township

Area
  - Total: 35.34 sq mi (91.5 km^{2})
  - Land: 34.93 sq mi (90.5 km^{2})
  - Water: 0.41 sq mi (1.1 km^{2}) 1.16%
- Elevation: 551 ft (168 m)

Population (2020)
  - Total: 1,714
  - Density: 49.07/sq mi (18.95/km^{2})
- Time zone: UTC-5 (Eastern (EST))
  - Summer (DST): UTC-4 (EDT)
- ZIP codes: 47847, 47928, 47974
- Area code: 765
- GNIS feature ID: 453282

Eugene Township is one of five townships in Vermillion County, in the U.S. state of Indiana. As of the 2020 census, its population was 1,714 (down from 2,025 at 2010) and it contained 855 housing units.

== Geography ==
According to the 2010 census, the township has a total area of 35.34 square miles (91.5 km^{2}), of which 34.93 square miles (90.5 km^{2}) (or 98.84%) is land and 0.41 square miles (1.1 km^{2}) (or 1.16%) is water.

=== Cities ===
- Cayuga

=== Unincorporated towns ===
- Eugene at 39.9664267°N 87.4727942°W

(This list is based on USGS data and may include former settlements.)

=== Cemeteries ===
The township contains five cemeteries: Brown, Eugene, Groenendyke, Isle and Patrick.

=== Landmarks ===
- County Fairgrounds
- The Eugene Covered Bridge was listed on the National Register of Historic Places in 1994.

== School districts ==
- North Vermillion Community School Corporation

== Political districts ==
- Indiana's 8th congressional district
- State House District 42
- State Senate District 38
