= Christ Memorial Reformed Episcopal Church =

Demolished church in Philadelphia, United States

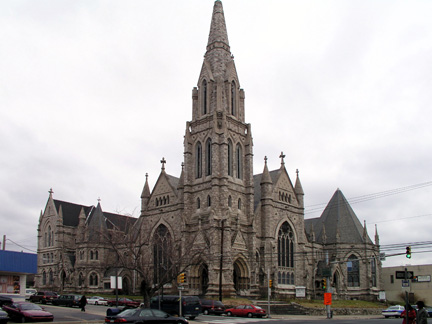
- Christ Memorial REC prior to the 2004 steeple collapse.
- Country: United States
- Denomination: Reformed Episcopal Church

History
- Founded: 1887
- Founder: Herman S. Hoffman

Architecture
- Architect: Isaac Pursell
- Style: Victorian Gothic
- Groundbreaking: 1887
- Completed: 1888
- Construction cost: $150,000
- Closed: 2004
- Demolished: 2018

Administration
- Diocese: Diocese of the Northeast and Mid-Atlantic
- Christ Memorial Reformed Episcopal Church
- U.S. Historic district – Contributing property
- Part of: West Philadelphia Streetcar Suburb Historic District (ID97001669)
- Added to NRHP: April 5, 1998

Christ Memorial Reformed Episcopal Church was a Reformed Episcopal Church congregation in Philadelphia. Founded in 1887 and completed in 1888, the building it occupied in West Philadelphia was for most of its history was also the campus of Reformed Episcopal Seminary. In 2004, a lightning strike caused the decaying steeple of the church to collapse, resulting in the building's closure. After a prolonged conflict over the insurance payout, the REC sold the building, which was demolished in 2018 and replaced by apartments.

== History ==
Christ Memorial REC was founded in 1887 as a church home at 43rd and Chestnut Streets for the campus of the newly created Theological Seminary of the Reformed Episcopal Church. The church and seminary were established based on the pledge of a trust created by Harriet Benson in March 1886. The seminary opened the doors to its first class of students on September 30, 1887, in its new building after the trust was received on March 16, 1887. The church, meanwhile, was consecrated by Bishops William Nicholson and Charles E. Cheney in November 1888. Rectors during the 20th century included REC Presiding Bishop Frank V. C. Cloak.

In the 1980s, the seminary acquired the property next to the building, conducting most of its operations there while continuing to use the dormitory and worship space in the original building. Christ Memorial REC continued to use the original building for its congregation and a grade school. In 2001, with a reduction in full-time residential students, the seminary relocated to its own lower-cost campus in Blue Bell, Pennsylvania. Christ Memorial REC continued to host a parish school and a homeless shelter.

=== Lightning strike and demolition ===
On August 3, 2004, the steeple of Christ Memorial REC was struck by lightning during a thunderstorm, resulting in the steeple's complete collapse. Despite the intrusion of debris into the sidewalk and surrounding roads, nobody was seriously injured. The approximately 90 people living in the onsite homeless shelter were on the opposite side of the building and thus unharmed.

The congregation had dwindled to 40-60 people by this time, and it began temporarily holding services at Grace Reformed Episcopal Church in Collingdale, Pennsylvania. Repairs were estimated at $8 million; however, GuideOne Insurance denied the church's claim. In 2006, an arbitrator ordered the insurer to pay the Reformed Episcopal Church $7.3 million. However, after attorneys' fees and other costs, the net award to the REC fell well short of the cost of repairs, so the church recommended the sale of the ruined church, using the proceeds of arbitration and the sale to support the church, the local diocese's urban ministries and the Reformed Episcopal Seminary.

A local developer bought the building for $712,150. Initial efforts to stabilize portions of the roof allowed the church and homeless shelter to remain on the premises. Christ Memorial REC eventually relocated its parish school permanently to Grace REC's site in Collingdale and merged with Grace. In April 2018, amid efforts by neighborhood activists to obtain landmark designation for the building, a demolition permit was issued. The vacant building was sold in June 2018 for $10 million to a New York City developer, and demolition began later that year. A multistory residential building now occupies the site.

== Architecture ==
Prolific East coast church architect Isaac Pursell designed the building in high Victorian Gothic Revival style. The church included numerous decorative patterns, scalloping, lancet windows, and finials typical of Victorian Gothic.

== Preservation efforts ==
In October 2017, the Preservation Alliance of Greater Philadelphia began efforts to obtain historic designation for Christ Memorial REC separate from its recognition as an NRHP historic district contributing property. According to designer Amy Lambert, "the building was structurally sound and could have been retrofitted to serve other purposes." However, Spruce Hill zoning director Barry Grossbach said that restoration efforts could have been "prohibitively expensive" regardless of landmark status.
