= Little Italy Festival =

Coordinates: 39°39′36″N 87°24′21″W

Little Italy Festival L.I.F.T
- Status: Active
- Genre: Italian Festival
- Begins: September 1, 2023
- Ends: September 4, 2023
- Frequency: Labor Day Weekend
- Venue: Main St, 9th St, Water St, Wine Garden,
- Location: Clinton Indiana
- Inaugurated: September 4, 1966
- Previous event: 56th
- Next event: 57th
- Attendance: over 250,000
- Website: www.littleitalyfestivals.com

Little Italy Festival is an annual festival that takes place on Labor Day Weekend in Clinton, Indiana. The festival is run by the L.I.F.T. (Little Italy Festival Town) board, and the City of Clinton. Each year a Little Italy Festival Queen of Grapes is crowned, as well as Re (King) & Regina (Queen).

== History ==
At the February 1966 meeting of the Clinton Lions Club, a proposal was made to build an attractive planter at Elm and Water Streets. This spot was then occupied by a road barrier; when a new Wabash River bridge was built a short distance to the south, the barrier had been erected to prevent drivers from using the old roadway. A first project estimate was set at approximately $300 and a committee named to investigate the possibilities. At about the same time, an area television station asked the Clinton Chamber of Commerce to submit a representative photograph that could be used on broadcasts to community at a glance. A photographer from Daily Clintonian was asked to provide the image, and because he was also a member of the Lions Club project committee, he prompted the publication of several newspaper articles citing Clinton's lack of identity and urging cooperation with the Lions' proposed project. Readers responded with a variety of suggestions, which included connections with the city's history of coal mining and its current wealth of Italian restaurants. Members of the Lions' committee considered the various proposals, chose an Italian theme, and decided to abandon the planter idea; to them, the Italian theme seemed natural because a neighborhood in the city's north had been heavily Italian earlier in the city's history. As the Lions began to prepare for the festival, they invited representatives of other local organizations to participate, and approximately thirty groups were represented at the next planning meeting. Amid sketches of suggested fountains, planters, speaker-band platforms, and general Old World scenic settings, the delegates chose the name "Project LIFT"; the latter word was meant to be an acronym for "Little Italy Festival Town" as well as indicating the delegates' hope that the festival would give their community a lift. Soon after this meeting, the group incorporated as "LIFT, Inc." The festival has endured into the 2010s; annual attendance typically varies between sixty thousand and eighty thousand.

The festival went on hiatus in 2020 due to the COVID-19 pandemic and plans to return the next year.

== Landmarks ==
Immigrant Square is a square created to represent those who have immigrated to Clinton. In 1973, the statue of a man, who Joe Airola called Luigi, was created. Later, a coal fountain was constructed in front of Luigi. The Bull's head, also called Il Toro, is a drinking fountain created by Joe Airola. Joe envisioned this statue and with the help of his brother-in-law presented the concept to the Mayor of Turin. Airola felt that the bull was a symbol of Turin, a major city located in the Piedmont area in northern Italy.

Little Italian House also known as La Piccolla Casa is a house that was believed to have been built in 1921. The Ricauda family owned the house from 1923 to 1971. It was then sold to Joseph P. Beno. In 1979, The L.I.F.T. committee purchased the house. Martha Costello's efforts to preserve the house led to it being open to the public in 1979. The house features a garden, Italian immigrant photos, furniture and household products.

== Features ==
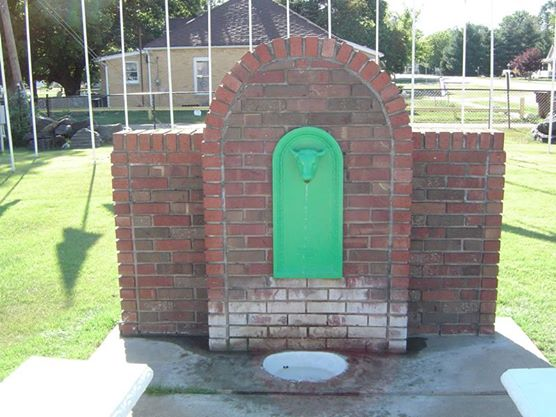
Bull's Head Fountain located at Immigrant Plaza, Clinton, IN, USA. Cast in Turin, Italy

Admission to the Little Italy Festival is free including the Midway. Other attractions do cost money, such as the food, games/rides, Wagon Ride Tour, and the consumer stands.

The Little Italy Festival officially kicks-off at 6 P.M. the Friday before Labor Day, with the Little Italy Festival Parade and runs until Labor Day.

Other features throughout the weekend include, but are not limited to:

- Lambrusco Cup
- Wine Gardens
- Spaghetti eating contest
- Grape Stomping
- Vicki West Dancers
- Queen and her Court
- L.I.F.T. Auction
- Bocce Ball Tournament
- Italian Marriage of the Waters
- Clinton Optimist Club Great Italian Duck Race
- La Piccolo Casa (Little Italian House)
- Mercato/Winery
- Wagon Ride Tour of Clinton landmarks (including Wine Gardens, Little Italian House, and Coal Fountain)
- Coal Town Museum
- Lions Club Salami and Cheese Wheel
- Trip to Italy Drawing, Ring Drawing, Bocce Club Drawing
- Monday night Firework Finale
- Strolling Musicians
- Eating Bagna Càuda
- Drinking water from Bull's head (pictured above) for good luck
