= Possum Bottom Covered Bridge =

- Possom Bottom Covered Bridge
- U.S. National Register of Historic Places
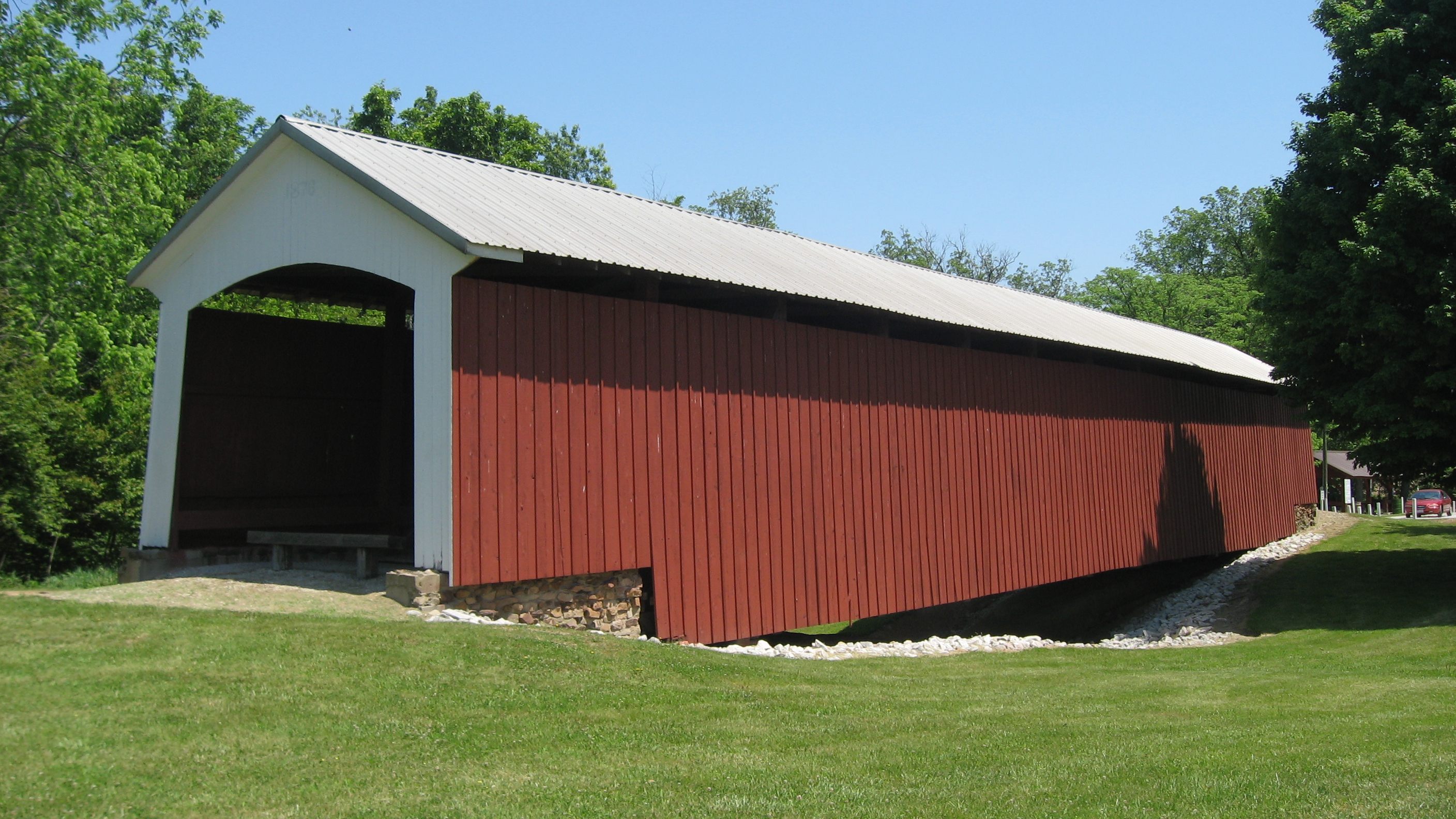
- Possum Bottom Covered Bridge, May 2012

- Location within Vermillion County, Indiana Location within Indiana Location within the United States
- Location: Northern side of U.S. Route 36, 0.2 miles (0.32 km) east of its junction with East Rd. and southeast of Dana, Helt Township, Vermillion County, Indiana
- Coordinates: 39°47′50″N 87°27′12″W
- Area: less than one acre (0.40 ha)
- Built: 1876
- Built by: Daniels, Joseph J.
- Architectural style: Burr Arch Truss
- NRHP reference No.: 94000584
- Added to NRHP: June 10, 1994

Possum Bottom Covered Bridge, also known as the Jackson's Ford Bridge and Hillsdale Bridge, is a historic Burr Arch Truss covered bridge located in Helt Township, Vermillion County, Indiana. It was built in 1876, and is a single span covered timber bridge. It measures 131 feet (40 m) long and 14 feet (4.3 m) wide. It was moved to its present location at the Ernie Pyle Rest Park in 1972.

It was listed on the National Register of Historic Places in 1994.

== See also ==
- Brouilletts Creek Covered Bridge
- Eugene Covered Bridge
- Newport Covered Bridge
