= Eugene, Indiana =

- Unincorporated community
- Vermillion County's location in Indiana

- Eugene's location in Vermillion County
- Coordinates: 39°57′44″N 87°28′21″W
- Country: United States
- State: Indiana
- County: Vermillion
- Township: Eugene
- Established: 1827
- Elevation: 509 ft (155 m)
- Time zone: UTC-5 (Eastern (EST))
  - Summer (DST): UTC-4 (EDT)
- ZIP code: 47928
- Area code: 765
- GNIS feature ID: 2830562

Eugene is an unincorporated community in Eugene Township, Vermillion County, in the U.S. state of Indiana.

== History ==
The town was laid out in 1827. Legend says that a local drunk, while searching for his wife, would frequently call out "Oh, Jane", but his inebriation caused it to sound more like "Eu, Jene", and this was taken as the name for the town; the actual source of the name is not known. A post office was established at Eugene in 1826, and remained in operation until 1954.

The town is the subject of several poems in Lantern Gleams from Old Eugene, a collection of poetry by Eugene native Alice Craig Fuller.

A historic covered bridge lies just north of the town.

== Demographics ==
The United States Census Bureau first delineated Eugene as a census designated place in the 2022 American Community Survey.
