= Clinton Downtown Historic District (Clinton, Indiana) =

Historic district in Indiana, United States

- U.S. National Register of Historic Places
- U.S. Historic district
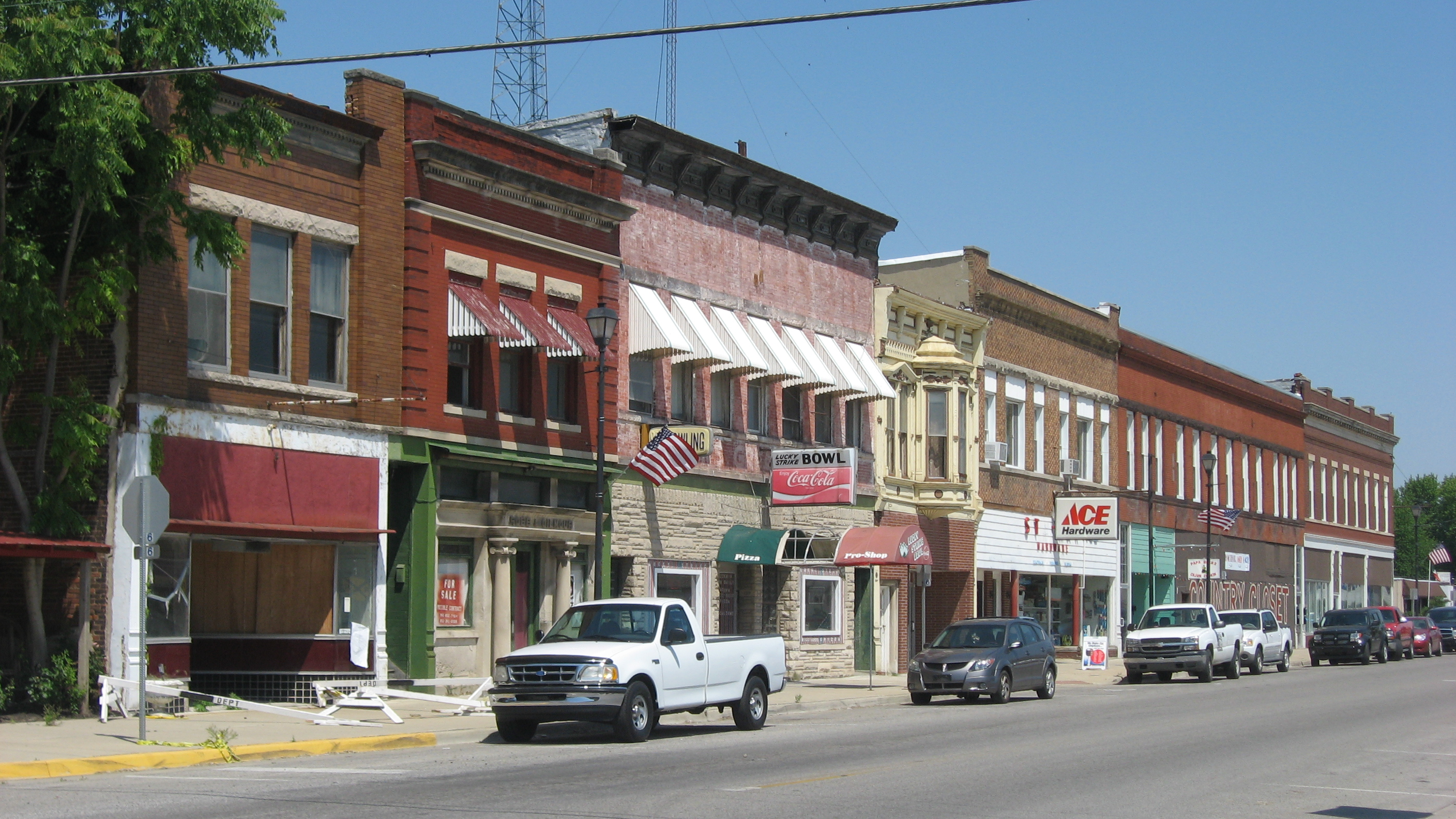
- Main Street in downtown Clinton, May 2012

- Location within Vermillion County, Indiana Location within Indiana Location within the United States
- Location: Roughly bet. S. Water and S. Third Sts.; Elm St. to the CRX RR R.O.W., Clinton, Indiana
- Coordinates: 39°39′34″N 87°23′54″W
- Area: 31 acres (13 ha)
- Architectural style: Italianate, Renaissance, et al.
- NRHP reference No.: 00000205
- Added to NRHP: March 15, 2000

Clinton Downtown Historic District is a national historic district located at Clinton, Indiana. The district encompasses 46 contributing buildings, 1 contributing site, and 1 contributing object in the central business district of Clinton. It developed between about 1880 and 1935 and includes representative examples of Italianate, Romanesque Revival, and Bungalow / American Craftsman style architecture. Notable contributing resources include the C. & E. I Passenger Station (c. 1910), Bogart Park and Claude Matthews bust / memorial, Scott-Martin Block (1907), H.H. Wisehart Building (1915), Mark W. Lyday Building (c. 1910), Ford Agency Building (c. 1910), and C. & E. I Freight Depot (1912).

It was listed on the National Register of Historic Places in 2000.
