= Hill Crest Community Center =

- U.S. National Register of Historic Places
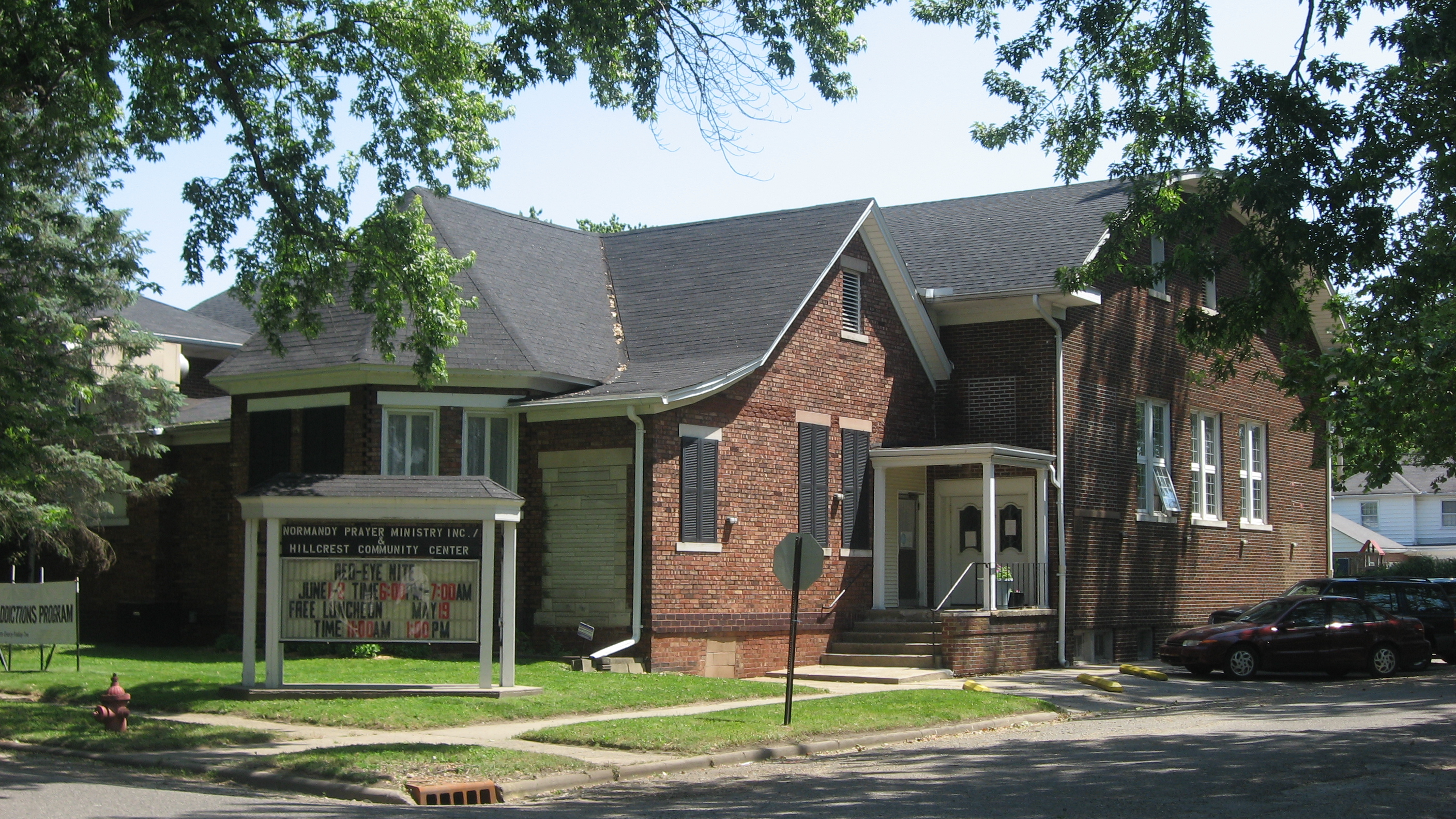
- Hill Crest Community Center, May 2012

- Location within Vermillion County, Indiana Location within Indiana Location within the United States
- Location: 505 N. Eighth St., Clinton, Indiana
- Coordinates: 39°40′25″N 87°24′25″W
- Area: 0.5 acres (0.20 ha)
- Built: 1911, 1922
- Architect: Pursell, Isaac
- Architectural style: Queen Anne, Prairie School, Colonial Revival
- NRHP reference No.: 97001555
- Added to NRHP: December 15, 1997

Hill Crest Community Center is a historic community center complex located at Clinton, Indiana. The complex was built between 1911 and 1922 and consists of three interconnected buildings. The chapel was designed by architect Isaac Pursell and built in 1911. It is a 1 1/2-story, brick building with Queen Anne style design elements. The gymnasium / auditorium building was added in 1922, and is a barrel-vaulted roofed brick building with Late Colonial Revival style design elements. The two-story, brick Prairie School style residence was also added about 1922. The community center provided a focus of community service to the immigrant population of Clinton.

It was added to the National Register of Historic Places in 1997.
