= Huttonsville, West Virginia =

- Town
- Location of Huttonsville in Randolph County, West Virginia.
- Coordinates: 38°42′48″N 79°58′38″W
- Country: United States
- State: West Virginia
- County: Randolph

Area
  - Total: 0.30 sq mi (0.78 km^{2})
  - Land: 0.30 sq mi (0.78 km^{2})
  - Water: 0 sq mi (0.00 km^{2})
- Elevation: 2,037 ft (621 m)

Population (2020)
  - Total: 163
  - Estimate (2021): 162
  - Density: 693.0/sq mi (267.58/km^{2})
- Time zone: UTC-5 (Eastern (EST))
  - Summer (DST): UTC-4 (EDT)
- ZIP code: 26273
- Area code: 304
- FIPS code: 54-39628
- GNIS feature ID: 1551537
- Website: https://townofhuttonsville.com/

Huttonsville is a town in Randolph County, West Virginia, United States, along the Tygart Valley River. The population was 163 at the 2020 census.

== History ==
Huttonsville was named for Jonathan Hutton, a pioneer settler.

Located at Huttonsville are the E. E. Hutton House and Tygarts Valley Church, listed on the National Register of Historic Places. Located near Huttonsville are the site of Cheat Summit Fort and Fort Marrow, also listed on the Register.

Huttonsville Correctional Center of the West Virginia Division of Corrections and Rehabilitation is located in the area.

== Geography ==
Huttonsville is located at 38°42′48″N 79°58′38″W (38.713266, -79.977329).

According to the United States Census Bureau, the town has a total area of 0.30 square miles (0.78 km^{2}), all land.

=== Climate ===
The climate in this area has mild differences between highs and lows, and there is adequate rainfall year-round. According to the Köppen Climate Classification system, Huttonsville has a marine west coast climate, abbreviated "Cfb" on climate maps.

== Demographics ==
Historical population
Census	Pop.	Note	%±
1910	251		—
1920	265		5.6%
1930	303		14.3%
1940	308		1.7%
1950	227		−26.3%
1960	242		6.6%
1970	167		−31.0%
1980	242		44.9%
1990	211		−12.8%
2000	217		2.8%
2010	221		1.8%
2020	163		−26.2%
2021 (est.)	162	▼	−0.6%
U.S. Decennial Census

=== 2010 census ===
At the 2010 census there were 221 people, 87 households, and 56 families living in the town. The population density was 736.7 inhabitants per square mile (284.4/km^{2}). There were 105 housing units at an average density of 350.0 per square mile (135.1/km^{2}). The racial makeup of the town was 99.5% White and 0.5% from two or more races. Hispanic or Latino of any race were 2.3%.

Of the 87 households 33.3% had children under the age of 18 living with them, 40.2% were married couples living together, 13.8% had a female householder with no husband present, 10.3% had a male householder with no wife present, and 35.6% were non-families. 31.0% of households were one person and 18.3% were one person aged 65 or older. The average household size was 2.54 and the average family size was 3.11.

The median age in the town was 32.4 years. 28.1% of residents were under the age of 18; 12.6% were between the ages of 18 and 24; 21.7% were from 25 to 44; 23% were from 45 to 64; and 14.5% were 65 or older. The gender makeup of the town was 48.0% male and 52.0% female.

=== 2000 census ===
At the 2000 census there were 217 people, 83 households, and 62 families living in the town. The population density was 707.3 inhabitants per square mile (270.3/km^{2}). There were 96 housing units at an average density of 312.9 per square mile (119.6/km^{2}). The racial makeup of the town was 99.08% White and 0.92% Asian. Of the 83 households 36.1% had children under the age of 18 living with them, 63.9% were married couples living together, 8.4% had a female householder with no husband present, and 24.1% were non-families. 22.9% of households were one person and 13.3% were one person aged 65 or older. The average household size was 2.61 and the average family size was 3.06.

The age distribution was 25.8% under the age of 18, 10.1% from 18 to 24, 30.9% from 25 to 44, 21.7% from 45 to 64, and 11.5% 65 or older. The median age was 35 years. For every 100 females, there were 88.7 males. For every 100 females age 18 and over, there were 91.7 males.

The median household income was $22,321 and the median family income was $24,821. Males had a median income of $24,107 versus $12,321 for females. The per capita income for the town was $11,827. About 14.5% of families and 16.6% of the population were below the poverty line, including 28.4% of those under the age of eighteen and 7.1% of those sixty five or over.

== See also ==
- Huttonsville Correctional Center
- Huttonsville State Farm Wildlife Management Area
