= Vermillion County Jail and Sheriff's Residence =

Historic government buildings in Indiana, United States

- U.S. National Register of Historic Places
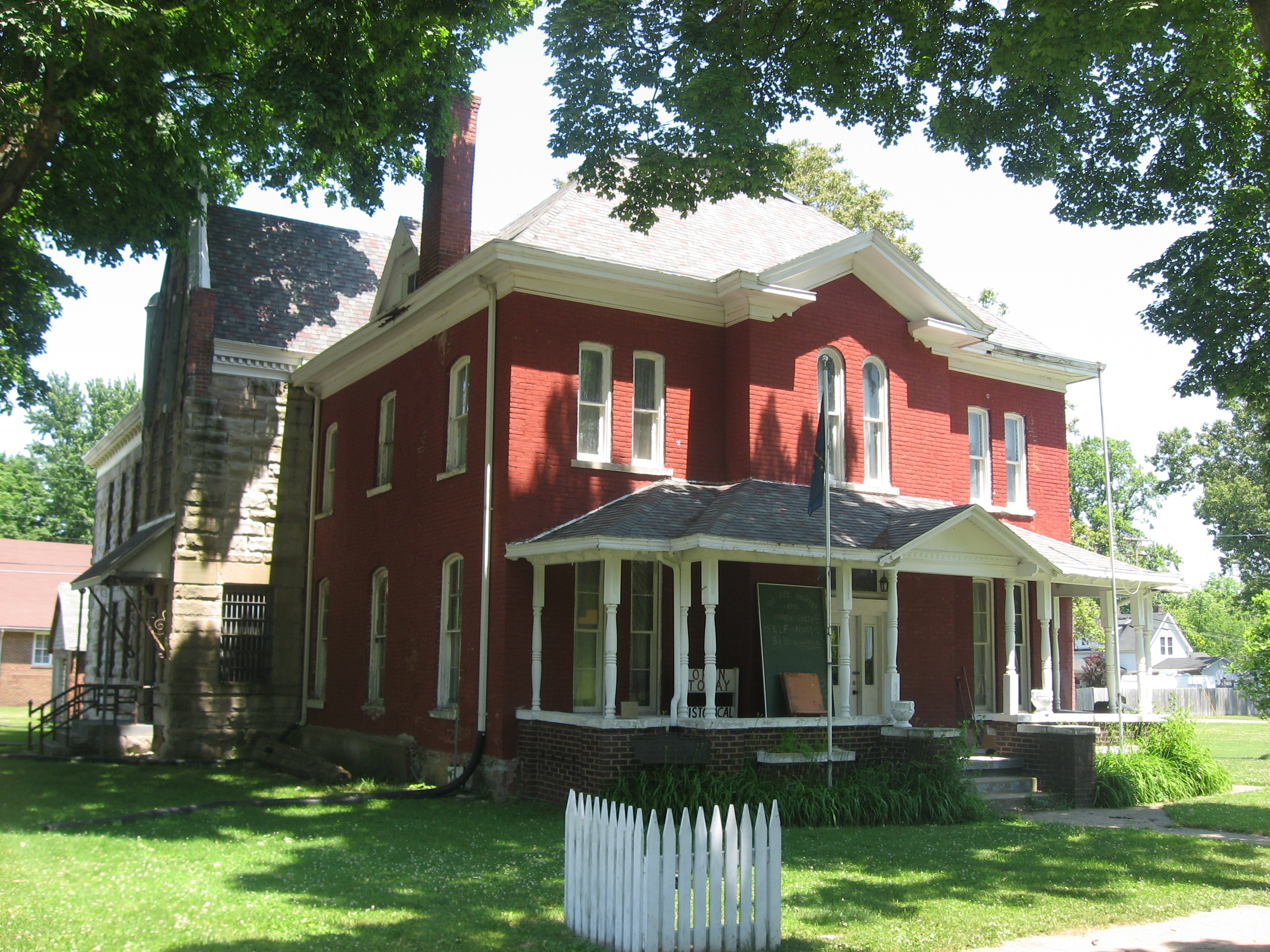
- Vermillion County Jail and Sheriff's Residence, May 2012

- Location within Vermillion County, Indiana Location within Indiana Location within the United States
- Location: 220 E. Market St., Newport, Indiana
- Coordinates: 39.88466°N 87.40672°W
- Area: less than one acre
- Built: 1868, 1896
- Built by: Epperson, Richard
- Architect: Leach, C.B.; Gaddis, John W.
- Architectural style: Italianate, Romanesque
- NRHP reference No.: 99000305
- Added to NRHP: March 12, 1999

Vermillion County Jail and Sheriff's Residence is a historic combined jail and sheriff's residence located at Newport, Indiana. The Sheriff's Residence was built in 1868, and is a two-story, Italianate style brick dwelling. It rests on a raised limestone foundation and has a steep hipped roof. It features round and segmental arched window openings and a full-width front porch. Attached to it is a two-story, vernacular Romanesque Revival style jail block of rusticated limestone. The jail block was designed by architect John W. Gaddis and added in 1896.

It was added to the National Register of Historic Places in 1999.
