= Newport Covered Bridge =

- U.S. National Register of Historic Places
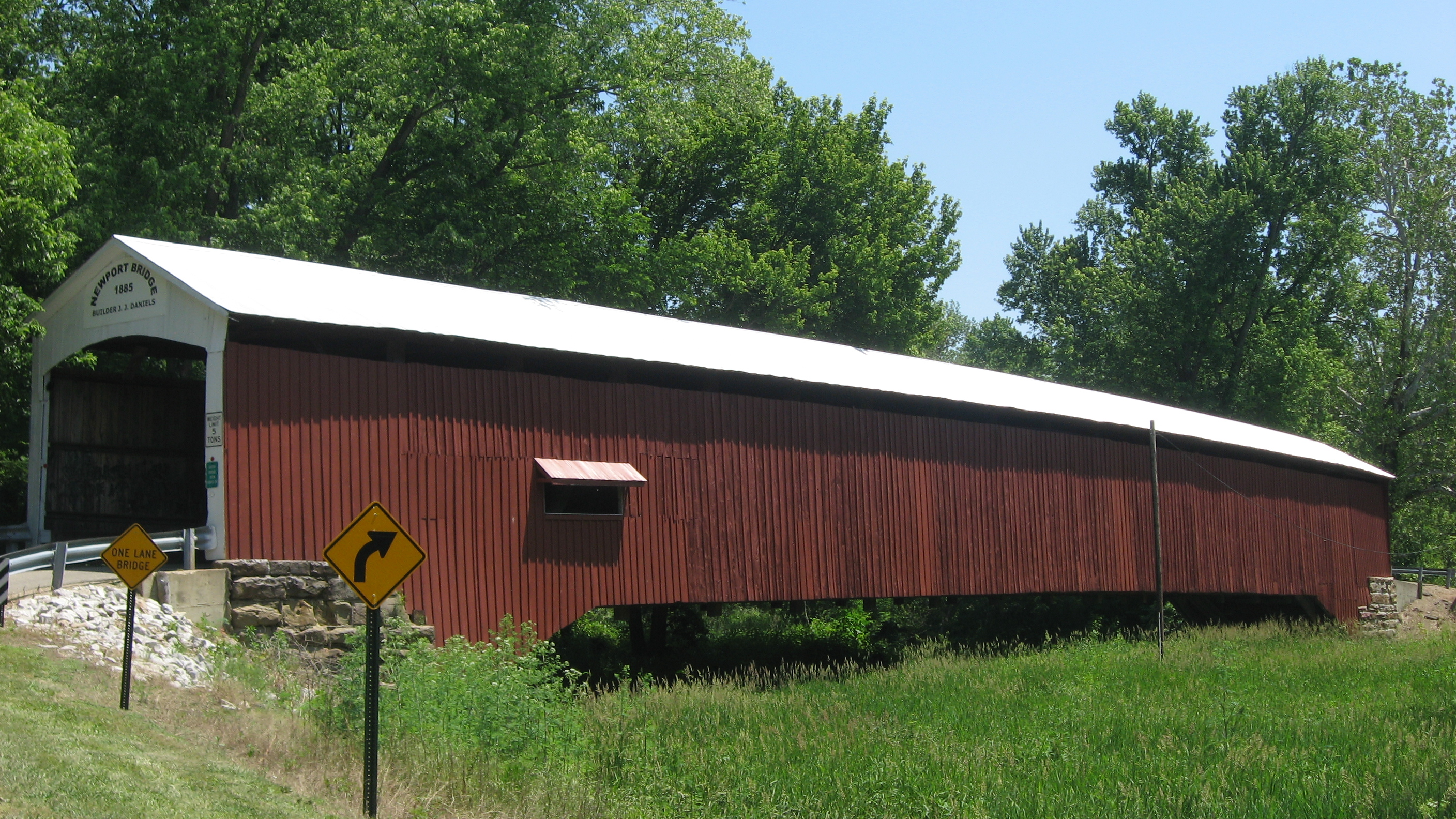
- Newport Covered Bridge, May 2012

- Location within Vermillion County, Indiana Location within Indiana Location within the United States
- Location: County Road 50N over the Little Vermillion River, northwest of Newport, Vermillion Township, Vermillion County, Indiana
- Coordinates: 39°53′28″N 87°26′0″W
- Area: less than one acre
- Built: 1885
- Built by: Daniels, Joseph J.
- Architectural style: Burr Arch Truss
- NRHP reference No.: 94000589
- Added to NRHP: June 10, 1994

Newport Covered Bridge, also known as the Morehead Covered Bridge and County Bridge No. 67, is a historic Burr Arch Truss covered bridge located in Vermillion Township, Vermillion County, Indiana. It was built in 1885, and is a single span covered timber bridge. It measures 210 feet long and 16 feet wide. The bridge spans the Little Vermilion River.

It was listed on the National Register of Historic Places in 1994.

== See also ==
- Brouilletts Creek Covered Bridge
- Eugene Covered Bridge
- Possum Bottom Covered Bridge
