= Eugene Covered Bridge =

- U.S. National Register of Historic Places
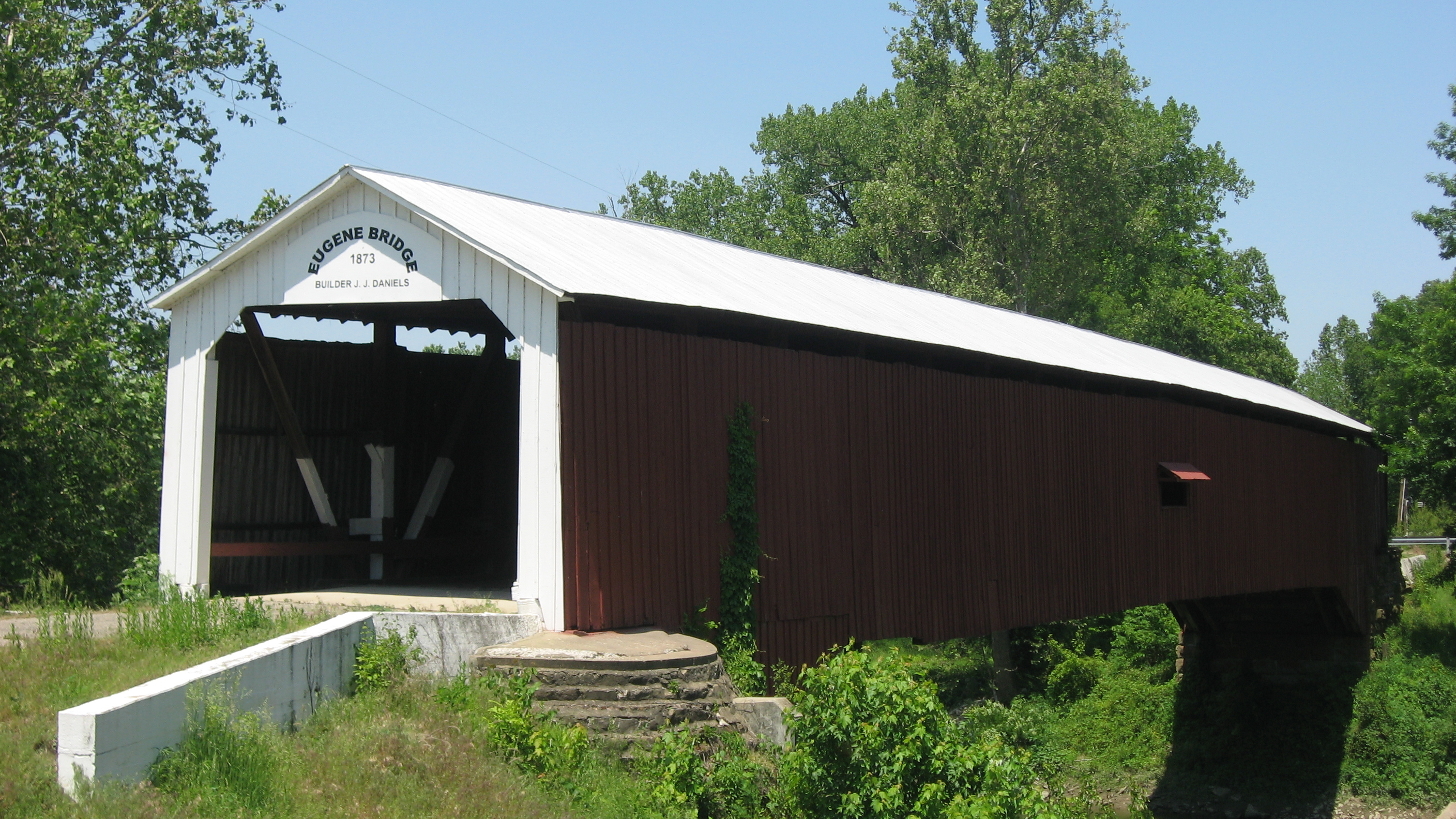
- Eugene Covered Bridge, May 2012

- Location within Vermillion County, Indiana Location within Indiana Location within the United States
- Location: Former Co. Rd. 00 over Big Vermillion R., Eugene, Indiana, Eugene Township, Vermillion County, Indiana
- Coordinates: 39°58′9″N 87°28′23″W
- Area: less than one acre
- Built: 1873
- Built by: Daniels, Joseph J.
- Architectural style: Burr Arch Truss
- NRHP reference No.: 94000585
- Added to NRHP: June 10, 1994

Eugene Covered Bridge, also known as County Bridge No. 75, is a historic Burr Arch Truss covered bridge located in Eugene Township, Vermillion County, Indiana. It was built in 1873, and is a single span covered timber bridge. It measures 180 feet long and 16 feet wide. The bridge spans the Big Vermilion River.

It was listed on the National Register of Historic Places in 1994.

== See also ==
- Brouilletts Creek Covered Bridge
- Newport Covered Bridge
- Possum Bottom Covered Bridge
