= Clinton, Indiana =

- City
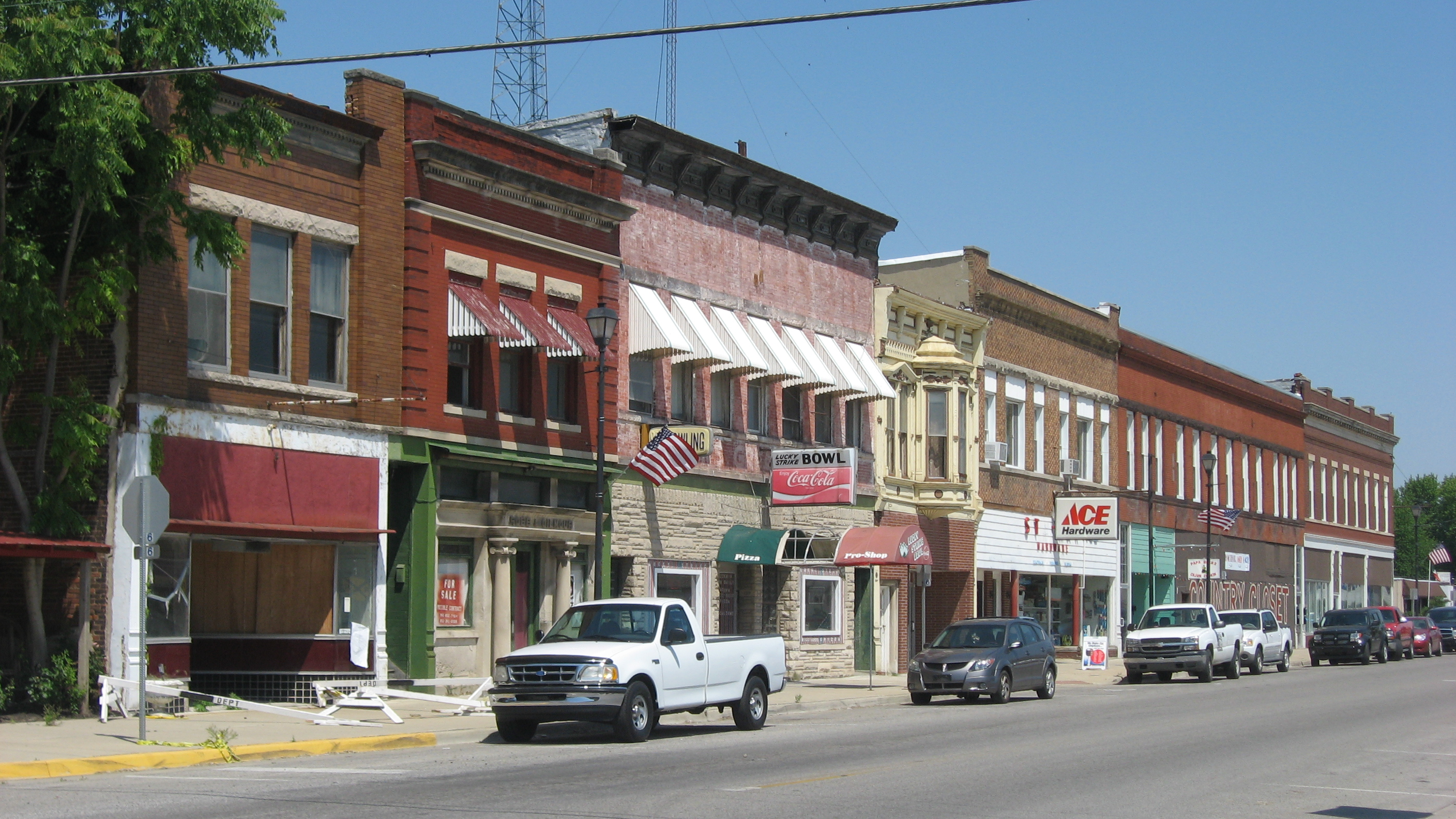
- Clinton's Downtown Historic District is listed on the National Register of Historic Places.
- Nickname: Little Italy Festival Town
- Location of Clinton in Vermillion County, Indiana
- Coordinates: 39°39′26″N 87°23′54″W
- Country: United States
- State: Indiana
- County: Vermillion
- Established: 1829

Government
  - Mayor: John D. Moore (D)

Area
  - Total: 2.28 sq mi (5.90 km^{2})
  - Land: 2.25 sq mi (5.83 km^{2})
  - Water: 0.023 sq mi (0.06 km^{2})
- Elevation: 486 ft (148 m)

Population (2020)
  - Total: 4,831
  - Density: 2,145.6/sq mi (828.41/km^{2})
  - Demonym: Clintonian
- Time zone: UTC-5 (Eastern (EST))
  - Summer (DST): UTC-4 (EDT)
- ZIP code: 47842
- Area code: 765
- FIPS code: 18-13780
- Website: www.clinton-in.com

Clinton is a city in Clinton Township, Vermillion County, Indiana, United States. As of the 2020 census, Clinton had a population of 4,831.

== History ==
The city was established in 1829 and is named for DeWitt Clinton, governor of New York from 1817 to 1823. Many of Clinton's original settlers were immigrants working in coal mines, many from Italy. According to Vermillion County naturalization records, "...from 1856 to 1952... Vermillion County received almost 3,550 new citizens of foreign birth, the largest number coming during the first twelve years of [the 20th] century. Italians accounted for one-third, or 1,178, of the total number who filed Declarations, with Austrians the next largest group (675) and then Scots. At least 77 percent of the Italians were from the northern regions of Italy." This was in contrast to the majority of Italian immigrants to America during this same time period that hailed from southern Italy. Over time, the coal mining industry in Clinton ended but many of the Italian settlers stayed at Clinton.

The Clinton post office has been in operation since 1823.

The Clinton Paving and Building Brick Company was established in 1893, at which time it was producing 40,000 bricks per day.

== Geography ==
Clinton is located in the southern part of the county along the Wabash River, near the intersection of State Road 63 (which passes just west of the city) and State Road 163 (which passes through the city). U.S. Route 41 lies just to the east of the city, across the river in neighboring Parke County. The smaller town of Fairview Park is adjacent to Clinton on the north side of the city.

According to the United States Census Bureau, Clinton has a total area of 2.259 square miles (5.85 km^{2}), of which 2.24 square miles (5.80 km^{2}) (or 99.16%) is land and 0.019 square miles (0.05 km^{2}) (or 0.84%) is water.

== Demographics ==
Historical population
Census	Pop.	Note	%±
1850	321		—
1860	307		−4.4%
1870	564		83.7%
1880	965		71.1%
1890	1,365		41.5%
1900	2,918		113.8%
1910	6,229		113.5%
1920	10,962		76.0%
1930	7,936		−27.6%
1940	7,092		−10.6%
1950	6,462		−8.9%
1960	5,843		−9.6%
1970	5,340		−8.6%
1980	5,267		−1.4%
1990	5,040		−4.3%
2000	5,126		1.7%
2010	4,893		−4.5%
2020	4,831		−1.3%
US Decennial Census

=== 2020 census ===
As of the 2020 census, Clinton had a population of 4,831. The median age was 40.3 years. 22.5% of residents were under the age of 18 and 19.4% of residents were 65 years of age or older. For every 100 females there were 93.3 males, and for every 100 females age 18 and over there were 88.9 males age 18 and over.

99.7% of residents lived in urban areas, while 0.3% lived in rural areas.

There were 2,061 households in Clinton, of which 29.6% had children under the age of 18 living in them. Of all households, 36.3% were married-couple households, 22.2% were households with a male householder and no spouse or partner present, and 32.0% were households with a female householder and no spouse or partner present. About 35.4% of all households were made up of individuals and 15.7% had someone living alone who was 65 years of age or older.

There were 2,328 housing units, of which 11.5% were vacant. The homeowner vacancy rate was 1.8% and the rental vacancy rate was 8.6%.

Racial composition as of the 2020 census
Race	Number	Percent
White	4,564	94.5%
Black or African American	22	0.5%
American Indian and Alaska Native	12	0.2%
Asian	19	0.4%
Native Hawaiian and Other Pacific Islander	10	0.2%
Some other race	30	0.6%
Two or more races	174	3.6%
Hispanic or Latino (of any race)	73	1.5%

=== 2010 census ===
As of the 2010 United States census, there were 4,893 people, 1,988 households, and 1,232 families in the city. The population density was 2,184.4 inhabitants per square mile (843.4/km^{2}). There were 2,332 housing units at an average density of 1,041.1 per square mile (402.0/km^{2}). The racial makeup of the city was 97.5% White, 0.2% African American, 0.3% Native American, 0.2% Asian, 0.2% from other races, and 1.5% from two or more races. Hispanic or Latino people of any race were 1.0% of the population.

There were 1,988 households, of which 32.8% had children under the age of 18 living with them, 40.8% were married couples living together, 15.6% had a female householder with no husband present, 5.5% had a male householder with no wife present, and 38.0% were non-families. 33.2% of all households were made up of individuals, and 13.9% had someone living alone who was 65 years of age or older. The average household size was 2.36 and the average family size was 2.96.

The median age in the city was 38.8 years. 24.7% of residents were under the age of 18; 8% were between the ages of 18 and 24; 25.4% were from 25 to 44; 24.2% were from 45 to 64; and 17.7% were 65 years of age or older. The gender makeup of the city was 47.5% male and 52.5% female.

=== 2000 census ===
As of the 2000 United States census, there were 5,126 people, 2,124 households, and 1,319 families in the city. The population density was 2,284.5/sqmi (883.6/km^{2}). There were 2,379 housing units at an average density of 1,060.3/sqmi (410.1/km^{2}). The racial makeup of the city was 98.15% White, 0.35% African American, 0.37% Native American, 0.08% Asian, 0.16% from other races, and 0.90% from two or more races. Hispanic or Latino people of any race were 0.68% of the population.

There were 2,124 households, out of which 28.9% had children under the age of 18 living with them, 46.0% were married couples living together, 12.7% had a female householder with no husband present, and 37.9% were non-families. 33.9% of all households were made up of individuals, and 17.4% had someone living alone who was 65 years of age or older. The average household size was 2.29 and the average family size was 2.93.

The city population contained 22.9% under the age of 18, 8.6% from 18 to 24, 26.3% from 25 to 44, 21.0% from 45 to 64, and 21.2% who were 65 years of age or older. The median age was 38 years. For every 100 females, there were 83.8 males. For every 100 females age 18 and over, there were 77.1 males.

The median income for a household in the city was $29,330, and the median income for a family was $36,692. Males had a median income of $28,294 versus $22,927 for females. The per capita income for the city was $14,601. About 7.4% of families and 12.5% of the population were below the poverty line, including 11.3% of those under age 18 and 20.0% of those age 65 or over.

== Economy ==
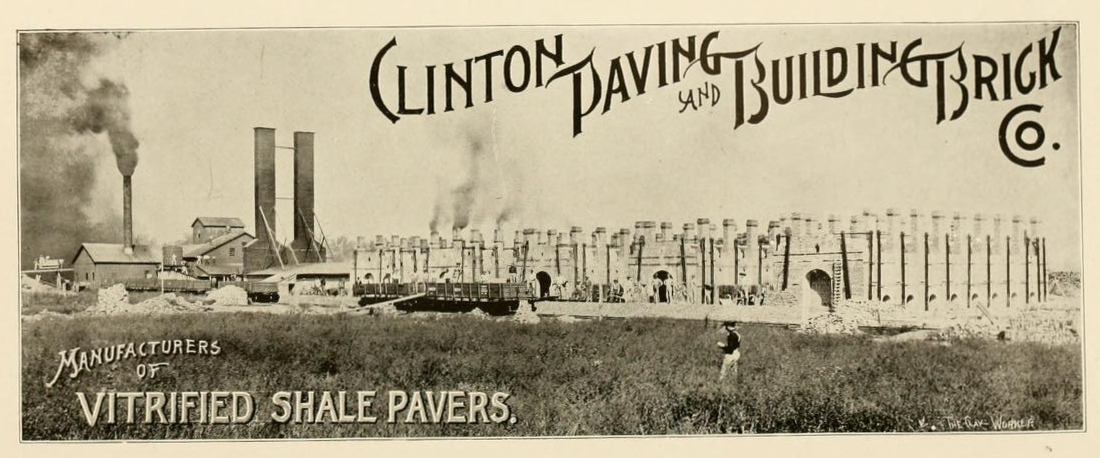
Clinton Paving and Building Brick Company c. 1913

Companies include:

- Elanco, which produces animal health and food safety drugs
- White Construction, specializing in energy infrastructure

The Vermillion Rise Mega Park is located in Clinton.

== Arts and culture ==
The Clinton Downtown Historic District and Hill Crest Community Center are listed on the National Register of Historic Places.

=== Public library ===
The town has a lending library, the Clinton Public Library.

=== Events ===
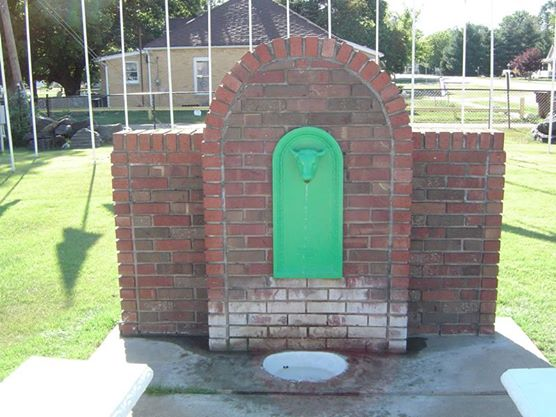
Bull's Head Fountain at Immigrant Plaza was cast in Turin, Italy.

The Little Italy Festival celebrates the area's Italian and coal mining heritage. Begun in 1966, the event draws over 75,000 visitors annually, featuring Italian and carnival-style food, grapevine-roofed wine garden, and grape stomping. The festival features the largest Italian-theme parade in the Midwest, and a coal mining museum.

== Government ==
Clinton city government consists of a mayor and a city council. The mayor is John D. Moore.

=== List of mayors ===
Democratic (15) Republican (9)

#	Mayor	Took office	Left office	Party	Terms	Notes
1	Wm. G. Merrill	1893	1896	Republican		May 1893 – May 1896
2	N.C. Anderson	1896	1898	Republican		May 1896 – Sept. 1898
3	C.M. White	1898	1902	Republican		May 1898 – June 16, 1902
4	D.C. Johnson	1902	1906	Republican		June 16, 1902 – May 1906
5	C.E. Loury	1906	1909	Republican	1	
6	H.M. Ferguson	1909	1911	Democratic	1	January 1, 1909, resigned October 16, 1911
7	M.M. Scott	1911	1911	Democratic	1	Elected by council October 16, 1911, served to November 21, 1911
8	M.J. Tucker	1911	1917	Democratic	2	Elected by council November 21, 1911, serving through 1913. He was then elected November 6, 1913, and served 1914 through 1917.
9	C.E. Loury	1918	1921	Republican	1	Again elected for 1918 through 1921
10	M.J. Tucker	1922	1925	Democratic	1	Again elected for 1922 through 1925. He died while in office February 9, 1924. L.T. Shannon, councilman, and Sam Kaneznovich both served as mayor pro term until a permanent mayor could be selected.
11	John Paine	1924	1929	Democratic	1	Elected mayor by council April 29, 1924, through 1925, then elected for 1926 through 1929.
12	Henry Owens	1930	1934	Republican	1	Elected for 1930 through 1933. The state legislature extended term one year. 1933 through 1934. Five years served.
13	C.M. Zink	1935	1942	Democratic	2	
14	Clarence “Tubby” Wright	1943	1955	Republican	3	Elected for 1943 through 1946. The state legislature again extended the term of office one additional year, through 1947. He was re-elected for 1948 through 1951. He was re-elected again for a record third term, 1952 through 1955 – a total of 13 years.
15	John Goldner	1956	1967	Democratic	3	
16	. Hugh L. McGill Jr.	1968	1979	Republican	3	
17	Arthur Lindsey Jr.	1980	1983	Democratic	1	
18	Don Natalie	1984	1987	Democratic	1	
19	Ramon J, Colombo	1988	1999	Democratic	3	
20	Ron Shepard	2000	2007	Democratic	2	
21	Jerry Hawkins	2008	2008	Democratic	1	
22	Art Lindsy	2008	2011	Democratic	1	
23	Jack Gilfoy	2012	2025	Democratic	4	Passed in office May 17, 2025
24	John D. Moore	2025	Present	Democratic	1	Won Caucus To replace Mayor Gilfoy June 14, 2025

== Education ==
Clinton and the southern half of Vermillion County are served by the South Vermillion Community School Corporation, That school district operates South Vermillion High School. which has three elementary schools, one middle school, and one high school.

Elementary schools are:

- Central Elementary School
- Van Duyn Elementary School

Glendale Elementary and Matthew's South Elementary schools, which were both located in Clinton City limits, consolidated with Central Elementary in the mid-1980s. The school district's residents could fit into one main elementary school, but because of the rural area around Clinton the decision was made to group the students into three smaller schools.

The middle school and high school are both located north of the city, in an unincorporated area of the county.

- South Vermillion Middle School
- South Vermilion High School

The high school was formerly known as Clinton High School before the current school was constructed in 1977.

== Infrastructure ==
The fire department is a combination career/volunteer organization.

Indiana State Road 163 is runs through Clinton.

The city is served by Union Hospital – Clinton.

== Notable people ==
- Armando Frigo, second American-born soccer player to ever play in Serie A, Italy's top league
- Lawrence J. Giacoletto, known for his work in the field of semiconductor circuit technology
- Margaret Gisolo, baseball pioneer, attended high school in Clinton
- Charles Edward Jones, astronaut killed in the September 11 attacks
- Ken Kercheval, actor, best known for his role on the television series Dallas
- Jill Marie Landis, award-winning romance writer
- Orville Lynn Majors, licensed practical nurse at the Vermillion County Hospital in Spencer; convicted of six counts of first-degree murder
- Claude Matthews, former governor of Indiana
- Sister Esther Newport, painter, art educator and founder of the Catholic Art Association
- Danny Polo, musician proclaimed by Benny Goodman as "the world's greatest clarinet player"
- Clarine Nardi Riddle, first female attorney general of Connecticut
- Bobby Sturgeon, baseball player of 1940s
- Henry Dana Washburn, Civil War general, US Congressman, explorer

== In popular culture ==
In 2016, a satirical news website posted a fake news story about the town, claiming that the mayor was changing the town's name to avoid referencing Bill and Hillary Clinton.
