= Indiana State Road 163 =

Highway in Indiana

State Road 163
- SR 163 highlighted in red

Route information
- Maintained by INDOT
- Length: 8.886 mi (14.301 km)
- Existed: 1931–present

Major junctions
- West end: IL border west of Blanford
- East end: US 41 at Clinton

Location
- Country: United States
- State: Indiana
- Counties: Parke, Vermillion

Highway system
- Indiana State Highway System; Interstate; US; State; Scenic
← SR 162	→ SR 164

State Road 163 in the U.S. state of Indiana is a short 9-mile (14 km) route in Vermillion and Parke counties. Though it is an odd-numbered route, it is an east–west route.

== Route description ==
State Road 163 travels from the Illinois border in the town of Blanford and proceeds east through Centenary. It then crosses State Road 63 and proceeds into Clinton where it follows several streets on its way through the middle of town: Western Avenue, 9th street, Elm Street, Main Street, and Walnut Street. It then crosses the Wabash River at the east edge of town and joins U.S. Route 41 about a mile east of the river.

== Major intersections ==
County	Location	mi	km	Destinations	Notes
Vermillion	Clinton Township	0.00	0.00	Edgar CR 1300 N (Clinton Road); Edgar CR 2523 E	West end of SR 163 at Illinois border
Vermillion	Blanford	0.635	1.022	SR 71 north – St. Bernice	Southern terminus of SR 71
Vermillion	Clinton	5.367	8.637	SR 63 – Terre Haute, Cayuga	
Parke	Florida Township	8.886	14.301	US 41 – Terre Haute, Rockville	East end of SR 163
1.000 mi = 1.609 km; 1.000 km = 0.621 mi
