= Clinton Airport (disambiguation) =

Clinton Airport is an airport in Clinton, Indiana, United States (FAA: 1I7).

Clinton Airport may also refer to:

- Clinton Field in Wilmington, Ohio, United States (FAA: I66)
- Clinton Regional Airport in Clinton, Oklahoma, United States (FAA: CLK)
- Clinton Memorial Airport in Clinton, Missouri, United States (FAA: GLY)
- Clinton Municipal Airport (disambiguation), several airports
- Clinton National Airport, Little Rock, Arkansas (FAA: LIT)
- Clinton-Sherman Airport in Clinton, Oklahoma, United States (FAA: CSM)
