= Crompton Hill, Indiana =

- Unincorporated community
- Vermillion County's location in Indiana

- Crompton Hill's location in Vermillion County
- Coordinates: 39°39′21″N 87°25′09″W
- Country: United States
- State: Indiana
- County: Vermillion
- Township: Clinton
- Elevation: 610 ft (186 m)
- Time zone: UTC-5 (Eastern (EST))
  - Summer (DST): UTC-4 (EDT)
- ZIP code: 47842
- Area code: 765
- GNIS feature ID: 433146

Crompton Hill is an unincorporated community in Clinton Township, Vermillion County, in the U.S. state of Indiana.

== Geography ==
Crompton Hill is located at 39°39′21″N 87°25′09″W at an elevation of approximately 600 feet and overlooks the larger community of Clinton to the east. Indiana State Road 163 (Hazel Bluff Road) runs east-and-west through the town.
