= Alta, Indiana =

Unincorporated community in Indiana, USA

- Unincorporated community
- Vermillion County's location in Indiana

- Location in Vermillion County
- Coordinates: 39°46′20″N 87°23′12″W
- Country: United States
- State: Indiana
- County: Vermillion
- Township: Helt
- Elevation: 502 ft (153 m)
- Time zone: UTC-5 (Eastern (EST))
  - Summer (DST): UTC-4 (EDT)
- ZIP code: 47854
- Area code: 765
- GNIS feature ID: 430118

Alta is an unincorporated community in Helt Township, Vermillion County, in the U.S. state of Indiana.

== History ==
The town was laid out in 1871. The name probably refers to "elevation".

== Geography ==
Alta is located half a mile west of the Wabash River and about half a mile south of the town of Hillsdale, around the intersection of county roads 775 South and 400 East. A north-south CSX railroad line runs just east of Alta.
