= Easytown, Indiana =

- Vermillion County's location in Indiana

- Location in Vermillion County
- Coordinates: 39°36′38″N 87°30′01″W
- Country: United States
- State: Indiana
- County: Vermillion
- Township: Clinton
- Elevation: 587 ft (179 m)
- Time zone: UTC-5 (Eastern (EST))
  - Summer (DST): UTC-4 (EDT)
- ZIP code: 47842
- Area code: 765
- GNIS feature ID: 433961

Easytown is a former unincorporated community in Clinton Township, Vermillion County, in the U.S. state of Indiana.

== History ==
According to tradition, Easytown was so named on account of the "easygoing" spirit of its residents. The town stood until the 1970s when it and the surrounding area were bought by Peabody Coal Company, which entirely demolished the town. It is now a former settlement and mining town.
