= Jonestown, Indiana =

- Unincorporated community
- Vermillion County's location in Indiana

- Jonestown's location in Vermillion County
- Coordinates: 39°42′33″N 87°30′9″W
- Country: United States
- State: Indiana
- County: Vermillion
- Township: Helt
- Elevation: 633 ft (193 m)
- Time zone: UTC-5 (Eastern (EST))
  - Summer (DST): UTC-4 (EDT)
- ZIP code: 47842
- Area code: 765
- GNIS feature ID: 437106

Jonestown is an unincorporated community in Helt Township, Vermillion County, in the U.S. state of Indiana.

== History ==
Jonestown was laid out in about 1862 by Philip Jones, who gave the town his name. A post office called Jones was established in 1862. In 1867, the post office was transferred to Saint Bernice.

== Geography ==
Jonestown is located less than a mile east of the larger town of Saint Bernice.
