= West Dana, Indiana =

- Ghost town
- Vermillion County's location in Indiana

- West Dana's location in Vermillion County
- Coordinates: 39°48′11″N 87°31′28″W
- Country: United States
- State: Indiana
- County: Vermillion
- Township: Helt
- Elevation: 627 ft (191 m)
- Time zone: UTC-5 (Eastern (EST))
  - Summer (DST): UTC-4 (EDT)
- ZIP code: 47847
- Area code: 765
- GNIS feature ID: 445734

West Dana is an extinct town in Helt Township, Vermillion County, in the U.S. state of Indiana. The site is near the Illinois and Indiana border.

Even though the community no longer exists, it is still cited by the USGS.

== Geography ==
West Dana is located at 39°48′11″N 87°31′28″W.
