= Rhodes, Indiana =

- Unincorporated community
- Vermillion County's location in Indiana

- Location of Rhodes in Vermillion County
- Coordinates: 39°36′34″N 87°24′47″W
- Country: United States
- State: Indiana
- County: Vermillion
- Township: Clinton
- Elevation: 509 ft (155 m)
- Time zone: UTC-5 (Eastern (EST))
  - Summer (DST): UTC-4 (EDT)
- ZIP code: 47842
- Area code: 765
- GNIS feature ID: 441928

Rhodes is an unincorporated community in Clinton Township, Vermillion County, in the U.S. state of Indiana.

== History ==
Rhodes was founded in 1903 as a mining community.

== Geography ==
Rhodes is located at 39°36′34″N 87°24′47″W.
