= Montezuma Station, Indiana =

Montezuma Station
- Ghost town
- Vermillion County's location in Indiana

- Location of Montezuma Station in Vermillion County
- Coordinates: 39°47′42″N 87°23′12″W
- Country: United States
- State: Indiana
- County: Vermillion
- Township: Helt
- Elevation: 495 ft (151 m)
- Time zone: UTC-5 (Eastern (EST))
  - Summer (DST): UTC-4 (EDT)
- ZIP code: 47854
- Area code: 765
- GNIS feature ID: 439358

Montezuma Station is an extinct town in Helt Township, Vermillion County, in the U.S. state of Indiana.

A few buildings in the community exist, and it is still cited by the USGS.

== Geography ==
Montezuma Station is located at 39°47′42″N 87°23′12″W.
