= Union Hospital =

Union Hospital may refer to:

== China ==
- Peking Union Medical College Hospital, Beijing
- Union Hospital (Hong Kong), Tai Wai, Shatin, Hong Kong

== South Africa ==
- Union Hospital, now Netcare Alberton hospital, Alberton, Gauteng

== United States ==
- Union Hospital (Indiana), Terre Haute
- Union Hospital (Maryland), Elkton
- Union Hospital (New Jersey), Union, a hospital in New Jersey
