= Sandytown, Indiana =

- Unincorporated community
- Vermillion County's location in Indiana

- Sandytown's location in Vermillion County
- Coordinates: 39°40′55″N 87°26′46″W
- Country: United States
- State: Indiana
- County: Vermillion
- Township: Clinton
- Elevation: 600 ft (183 m)
- Time zone: UTC-5 (Eastern (EST))
  - Summer (DST): UTC-4 (EDT)
- ZIP code: 47842
- Area code: 765
- GNIS feature ID: 443014

Sandytown is an unincorporated community in Clinton Township, Vermillion County, in the U.S. state of Indiana.

== History ==
Sandytown began as a mining community. The community received its name on account of the sandy character of its soil.

== Geography ==
Sandytown is located at 39°40′55″N 87°26′46″W.
