= Needmore, Indiana =

Needmore is the name of the following places in the U.S. state of Indiana:

- Needmore, Brown County, Indiana
- Needmore, Lawrence County, Indiana
- Needmore, Vermillion County, Indiana
