= Highland, Vermillion County, Indiana =

Highland
- Unincorporated community
- Vermillion County's location in Indiana

- Highland's location in Vermillion County
- Coordinates: 39°47′40″N 87°23′45″W
- Country: United States
- State: Indiana
- County: Vermillion
- Township: Helt
- Elevation: 627 ft (191 m)
- Time zone: UTC-5 (Eastern (EST))
  - Summer (DST): UTC-4 (EDT)
- ZIP code: 47854
- Area code: 765
- GNIS feature ID: 436148

Highland is an unincorporated community in Helt Township, Vermillion County, in the U.S. state of Indiana.

== History ==
Highland was probably so named on account of its lofty elevation. A post office was established at Highland in 1838, and remained in operation until 1868. With the construction of the railroad, business activity shifted to nearby Hillsdale, and the town of Highland declined.

== Geography ==
Highland is located at 39°47′40″N 87°23′44″W (39.794444, -87.395556), one mile west of the Wabash River and the Parke County town of Montezuma, and less than a mile northwest of Hillsdale.
