= Salem United Methodist Church =

Salem United Methodist Church may refer to:

- Salem Methodist Episcopal Church (Clinton, Indiana), also known as Salem United Methodist Church
- Salem United Methodist Church (New York City), formerly known as Salem Methodist Episcopal Church
- Salem Methodist Episcopal Church and Parsonage (Newport, Kentucky), also known as Salem United Methodist Church
- Salem First United Methodist Church, in Salem, Oregon
