= Randall, Indiana =

- Ghost town
- Vermillion County's location in Indiana

- Randall's location in Vermillion County
- Coordinates: 39°46′30″N 87°31′21″W
- Country: United States
- State: Indiana
- County: Vermillion
- Township: Helt
- Elevation: 617 ft (188 m)
- Time zone: UTC-5 (Eastern (EST))
  - Summer (DST): UTC-4 (EDT)
- ZIP code: 47847
- Area code: 765
- GNIS feature ID: 441760

Randall is a former town in Helt Township, Vermillion County, in the U.S. state of Indiana. Randall is also 1.6 miles northwest of another extinct town: Toronto, on W County Road 700 S. The nearest extant community is the town of Dana, to the northeast.

== History ==
The post office at Randall was established in 1858 and discontinued in 1872. The community was named in honor of the Randall family of settlers.

== Geography ==
Randall is located at 39°46′30″N 87°31′21″W.
