= Needmore, Vermillion County, Indiana =

Needmore
- Unincorporated community
- Vermillion County's location in Indiana

- Needmore's location in Vermillion County
- Coordinates: 39°37′08″N 87°24′37″W
- Country: United States
- State: Indiana
- County: Vermillion
- Township: Clinton
- Elevation: 505 ft (154 m)
- Time zone: UTC-5 (Eastern (EST))
  - Summer (DST): UTC-4 (EDT)
- ZIP code: 47842
- Area code: 765
- GNIS feature ID: 439975

Needmore is an unincorporated community in Clinton Township, Vermillion County, in the U.S. state of Indiana.

== History ==
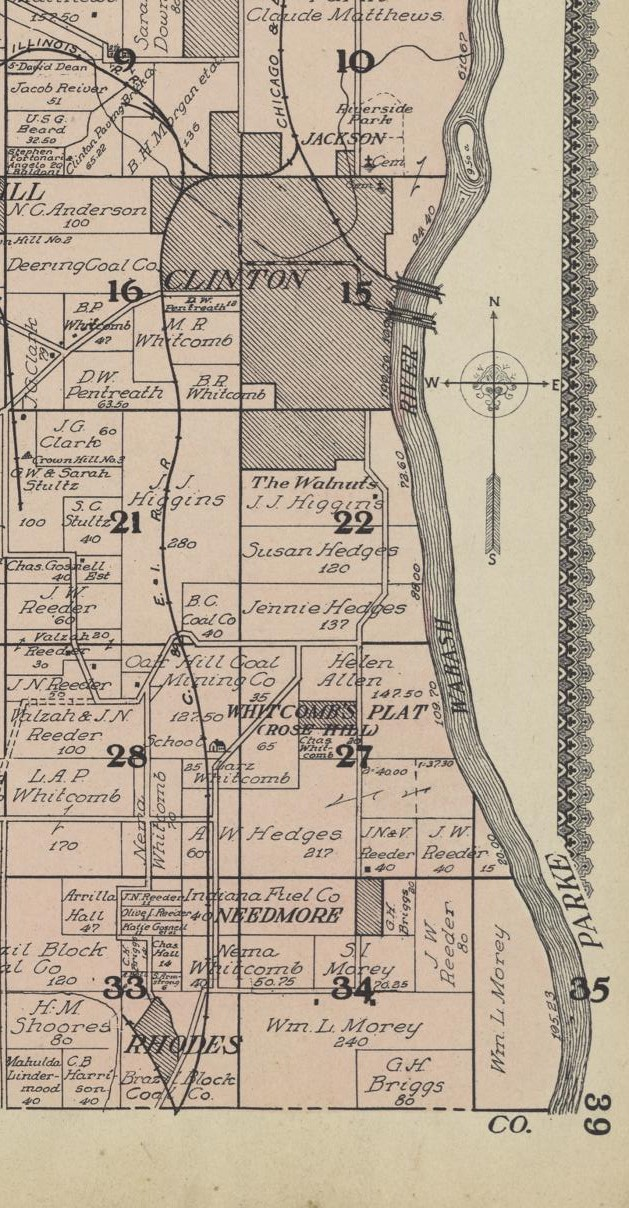
Map of Clinton, Needmore and Rhodes, Indiana, in 1909

Needmore was platted in 1904. The community began as a mining camp. The first mention of "Needmore" in the local Clinton newspaper was in October 1902, noting "the first child born in 'Needmore', the new town built just south of Clinton by moving the Geneva houses down there. Quite a number of families have moved in during the past week." A grocery store opened in Needmore by November 1903. By mid-1904, the place had three saloons, and the locals were complaining that they were open on Sundays. The Dering Coal Company owned 31 houses in Needmore as of 1905.

The mining camp atmosphere could be rowdy, and the local paper would run stories of the criminal mischief of its residents. In October 1907, four saloons in Needmore had their liquor licenses revoked, following liquor violations.

The Smith School south of Clinton was enlarged after Needmore was founded, and was used for a time before other area schools were enlarged.

Officials from the state of Indiana estimated Needmore's population as 50 in 1913, with Edward Barrett stating that "very few counties have shown so great an increase in the number of its people within the last three or four years as the county of Vermillion, especially the southern townships of Clinton." He credited the rapid development of mines in the region, as well as an influx of capital from Chicago, as leading to the rapid increase in population.

By the 1960s, Needmore's glory days were behind it, with one source noting that Needmore was "a coal town whose glory [...] lies in the past." A 2003 article in the Bloomington Herald Times discussed the multiple "Needmore"s in Indiana, and described this one as follows: "not far from the Wabash River, tucked between cornfields and a gravel pit is an enclave of about five homes, with not so much as a sign to indicate that this is one of the state's three Needmores." Local residents admitted the community was by then "near to NoMore" than Needmore.

== Geography ==
Needmore is located at 39°37′08″N 87°24′37″W, with the community platted in Section 34 of Clinton Township.

== See also ==
- Quaker, Indiana
