= Bono, Vermillion County, Indiana =

Bono
- Unincorporated community
- Vermillion County's location in Indiana

- Location in Vermillion County
- Coordinates: 39°45′37″N 87°29′38″W
- Country: United States
- State: Indiana
- County: Vermillion
- Township: Helt
- Elevation: 636 ft (194 m)
- Time zone: UTC-5 (Eastern (EST))
  - Summer (DST): UTC-4 (EDT)
- ZIP code: 47847
- Area code: 765
- GNIS feature ID: 431326

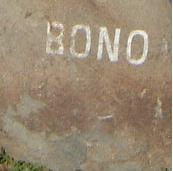
The Bono Rock, a local historical landmark.

Bono is an unincorporated community in Helt Township, Vermillion County, in the U.S. state of Indiana.

== History ==
Bono was founded in 1848. The name Bono is said to mean "good".

== Geography ==
Bono is located at 39°45′37″N 87°29′38″W about two miles east of the state line, at the intersection of Indiana State Road 71 and County Road 850 South. Bono Cemetery is located about a third of a mile west of town. The area around the town is mostly flat and open farmland; a small tributary of Norton Creek begins at Bono and flows southeast.
