= Long College for Women =

Coordinates: 38°42′44″N 85°27′39″W

The Long College for Women was a liberal arts, Presbyterian women's college associated with Hanover College in Hanover, Indiana between 1947 and 1978.

== History ==
=== Founding ===
Formally named Henry C. Long College for Women of Hanover College, Long College was the coordinate institution of Hanover. Hanover became a co-educational institution in 1879 when the Board of Trustees voted to fully accept female students into the college. Calla Harrison became the first woman to graduate from Hanover in 1883.

Following the death of longtime donor and major supporter of women's education Henry C. Long from Indianapolis — and especially after a subsequent donation of $750,000 from his estate — it was decided to open a coordinate institution. Long College was formally established on June 2, 1947. It was originally intended to last only ten years, but Hanover renewed the agreement in 1957 and extended the life of Long College.

The addition of Long College to Hanover College added more than $1 million to the joint college's annual budget. New buildings, including dining halls and dormitories, were constructed to assist the incoming women in particular.

=== Coordinate system ===
As with other coordinate women's institutions of the time, such as Pembroke College of Brown University and Newcomb College of Tulane University, students at Long shared most of the resources that were available to Hanover's male students. Although the colleges were technically separate in that all women received degrees from Long and all men received degrees from Hanover, the students shared the same campus, faculty, and even classes.

By the early 1960s, faced with the widespread coeducation movement of the decade, the board of trustees relented and allowed its female graduates to receive diplomas from Hanover instead of Long. Women were still not considered full Hanover students, however, and were required to register and attend as Long students.

=== Final years ===
During the Super Outbreak of April 3, 1974, the Hanover campus was devastated by a tornado. With $10 million in damages, the college began to look at ways to save money. Due to the need to save money and the rise of coeducation, Long was fully merged into Hanover on November 2, 1978, ending the coordinate college system and making the new single college fully coeducational.

== Notable people ==
A notable alumna of Long College is American-Canadian writer Carol Shields, who was a member of Alpha Delta Pi while at the college. Shields used the coordinate college system of Long and Hanover as inspiration in several of her works, especially The Stone Diaries.

Luella F. McWhirter (1859–1952) served as a trustee of the college.

== See also ==
- List of current and historical women's universities and colleges in the United States

== Sources ==
- Goertz, Dee. Carol Shields, Narrative Hunger, and the Possibilities of Fiction. University of Toronto Press, 2003.
- Songe, Alice H. American Universities and Colleges: A Dictionary of Name Changes. 1978.
- "Timeline of Hanover College History." Joseph Wood Evans Memorial Special Collections and Archives Center, Hanover College. October 30, 2007. Accessed March 20, 2008.
