= Luella F. McWhirter =

American philanthropist, clubwoman, and temperance leader (1859 – 1952)

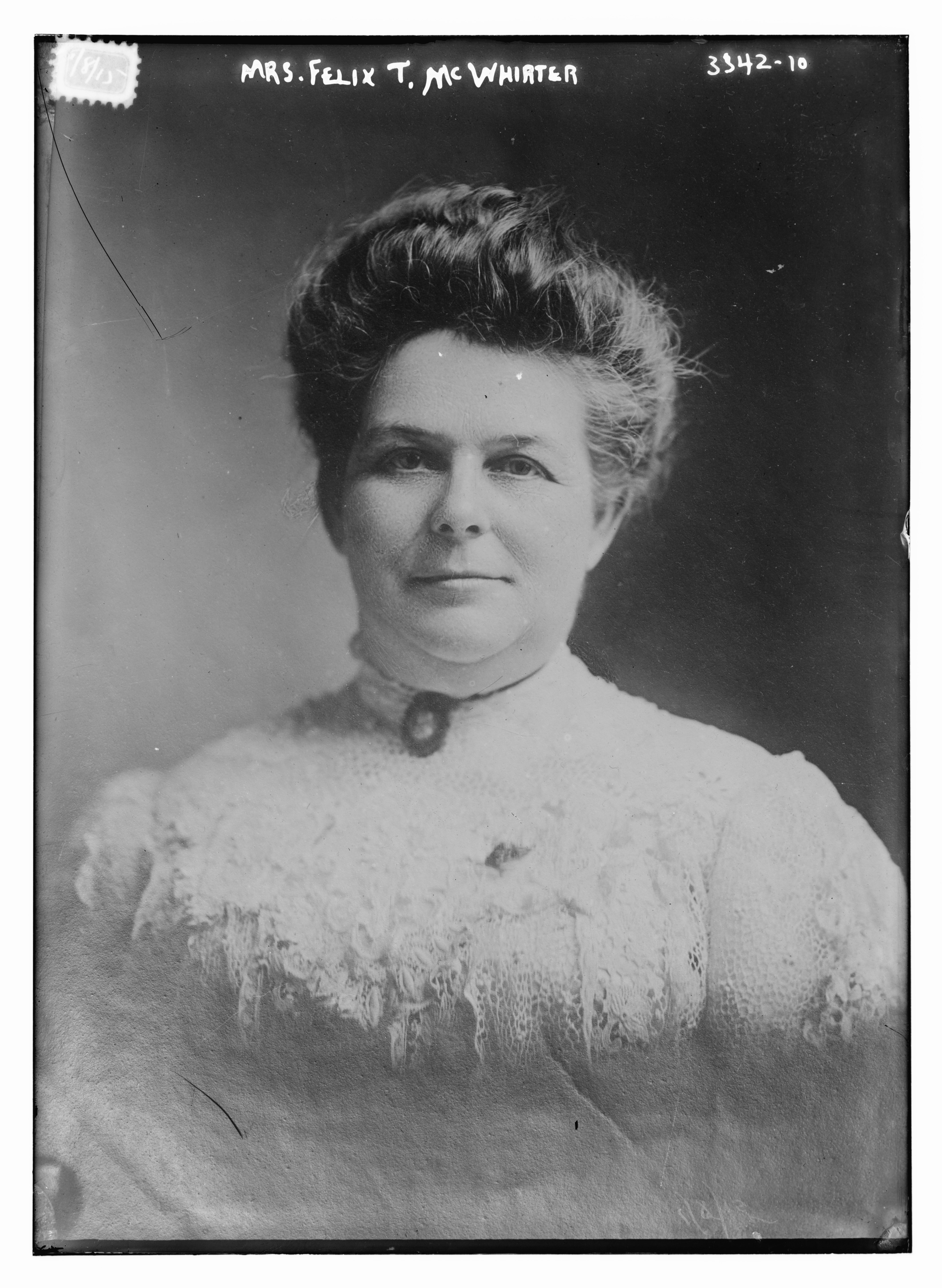
- Born: Luella Frances Smith; October 1, 1859; Perrysville, Indiana, U.S.
- Died: December 10, 1952 (aged 93); Indianapolis, Indiana, U.S.
- Resting place: Crown Hill Cemetery and Arboretum, Section 31, Lots 58 & 59
- Education: East Tennessee Wesleyan (now Tennessee Wesleyan University); DePauw University
- Occupations: philanthropist; clubwoman; social reformer
- Known for: President, Indiana State Woman's Christian Temperance Union
- Spouse: Felix T. McWhirter (m. 1878; died 1915)

Luella F. McWhirter (née , Smith; 1859–1952) was an American philanthropist, clubwoman, and temperance leader who was a member of a pioneer Indianapolis family. She served as president of the Indiana State Woman's Christian Temperance Union (WCTU), president of the National WCTU Editorial Association, president of the Legislative Council of Indiana Women, and president of the Winona Advisory Missionary Council, as well as vice-president of the Woman's Franchise League of Indiana and vice-president of the People's State Bank of Indianapolis. She was a public speaker on temperance, suffrage, and educational topics.

== Early life and education ==
Luella Frances Smith was born at Perrysville, Indiana, October 1, 1859. She was the only child of Rev. Hezekiah (1805–1879) and Susan Davis (Marters) (1819–1907) Smith. Her father was a clergyman of the Methodist Episcopal Church, who was for many years connected with the Northwest Indiana Conference, and was widely known as a circuit rider and revivalist.

She was educated at the East Tennessee Wesleyan (now Tennessee Wesleyan University) and at DePauw University.

== Career ==
After removing to Indianapolis, she became a member of a number of clubs and other organizations and a leader in their public activities, serving in official positions in many of them. She was president of the Legislative Council of Indiana Women, the Indiana Federation of Women's Clubs (1911–1913), and of the Woman's department of the Indianapolis Club, as well as transportation chair of the General Federation of Women's Clubs (1916–1924), and chair of the American Home department of the Indiana Federation of Clubs. She also served as a director of the People's State Bank of Indianapolis, from the time of its organization, being the first woman chosen in that city for such an office.

McWhirter was an early member of the WCTU, and always took a prominent part in temperance work in Indianapolis and in the State in general. She served as president of the State WCTU (1896 to 1900), and from 1897 until at least 1928, she was a trustee of that organization and editor of the State organ, The Message. In addition, from 1894 till 1897, she was the president of the National WCTU Editorial Association.

McWhirter was widely interested in other forms of social service, especially missionary and educational work. She was president of the Winona Advisory Missionary Council. McWhirter was a teacher of parliamentary law classes, and a trustee of Long College for Women.

== Personal life ==
On November 18, 1878, at Greencastle, Indiana, she married Felix T. McWhirter (d. 1915), a banker, of Indianapolis, Indiana. They had four children: Luella, Ethel, Felix, and Susan.

McWhirter was a charter member of the Daughters of the American Revolution.

In religion, she was a member of the Methodist Episcopal Church.

Luella F. McWhirter died in Indianapolis, December 10, 1952. Her papers are held at the Lilly Library, Indiana University, in Bloomington, Indiana.
