= Gessie, Indiana =

- Unincorporated community
- Vermillion County's location in Indiana

- Gessie's location in Vermillion County
- Coordinates: 40°04′57″N 87°29′59″W
- Country: United States
- State: Indiana
- County: Vermillion
- Township: Highland
- Established: 1872
- Elevation: 620 ft (189 m)
- Time zone: UTC-5 (Eastern (EST))
  - Summer (DST): UTC-4 (EDT)
- ZIP code: 47974
- Area code: 765
- GNIS feature ID: 435046

Gessie is a small unincorporated community in Highland Township, Vermillion County, in the U.S. state of Indiana.

== History ==
The town was laid out in 1872 by Robert J. Gessie, who gave the town his name. A post office was established at Gessie in 1872, and remained in operation until 1967.

The sole business in the town was a grain elevator, next to the CSX railroad tracks. The grain elevator was destroyed by a tornado. Remnants of the elevator, were used to build a series of grain bins on the east side of town across the tracks.
