= Klondyke, Indiana =

- Unincorporated community
- Vermillion County's location in Indiana

- Klondyke's location in Vermillion County
- Coordinates: 39°40′10″N 87°26′12″W
- Country: United States
- State: Indiana
- County: Vermillion
- Township: Clinton
- Elevation: 600 ft (183 m)
- Time zone: UTC-5 (Eastern (EST))
  - Summer (DST): UTC-4 (EDT)
- ZIP code: 47842
- Area code: 765
- GNIS feature ID: 437381

Klondyke is an unincorporated community in Clinton Township, Vermillion County, in the U.S. state of Indiana.

== History ==
The town was named for the local Klondyke Mines, which were active in the early 1900s.
