= Universal, Indiana =

- Town
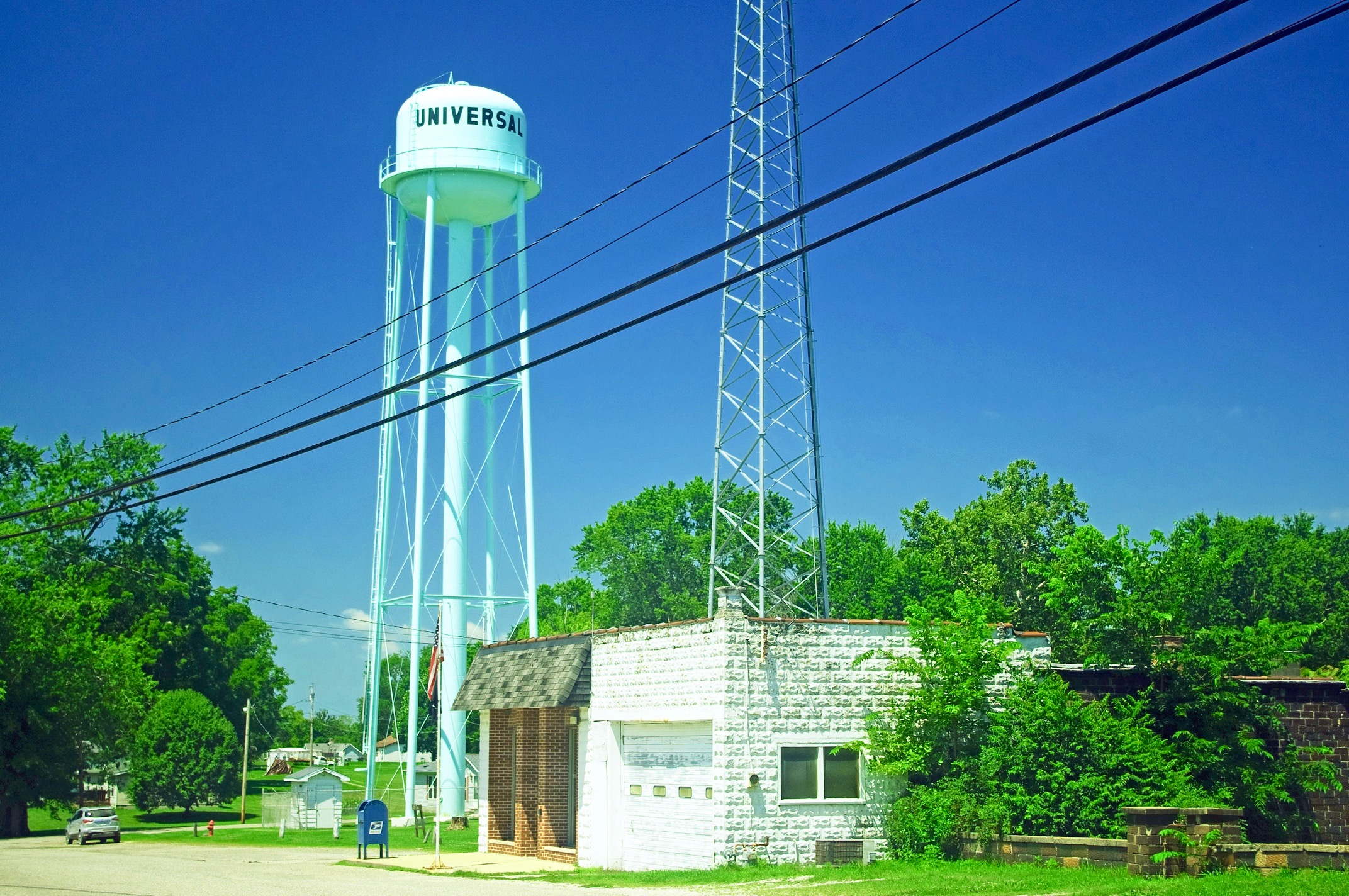
- Water tower in Universal

- Location of Universal in Vermillion County, Indiana.
- Coordinates: 39°37′28″N 87°27′24″W
- Country: United States
- State: Indiana
- County: Vermillion
- Township: Clinton

Area
  - Total: 0.36 sq mi (0.93 km^{2})
  - Land: 0.36 sq mi (0.93 km^{2})
  - Water: 0 sq mi (0.00 km^{2})
- Elevation: 581 ft (177 m)

Population (2020)
  - Total: 283
  - Density: 785.9/sq mi (303.44/km^{2})
- Time zone: UTC-5 (Eastern (EST))
  - Summer (DST): UTC-4 (EDT)
- ZIP code: 47884
- Area code: 765
- FIPS code: 18-77912
- GNIS feature ID: 2397706

Universal is a town in Clinton Township, Vermillion County, in the U.S. state of Indiana. As of the 2020 census, Universal had a population of 283.

== History ==
Universal was founded in 1911 as a mining community. The town took its name from the nearby Universal Mines. A post office has been in operation at Universal since 1912.

== Geography ==
Universal is located in the far southern part of the county, just to the west of Indiana State Road 63.

According to the 2010 census, Universal has a total area of 0.36 square miles (0.93 km^{2}), all land.

== Demographics ==
Historical population
Census	Pop.	Note	%±
1920	1,570		—
1930	642		−59.1%
1940	603		−6.1%
1950	479		−20.6%
1960	424		−11.5%
1970	462		9.0%
1980	428		−7.4%
1990	392		−8.4%
2000	419		6.9%
2010	362		−13.6%
2020	283		−21.8%
U.S. Decennial Census

=== 2010 census ===
As of the census of 2010, there were 362 people, 151 households, and 103 families living in the town. The population density was 1,005.6 inhabitants per square mile (388.3/km^{2}). There were 176 housing units at an average density of 488.9 per square mile (188.8/km^{2}). The racial makeup of the town was 99.4% White, 0.3% African American, and 0.3% from two or more races. Hispanic or Latino of any race were 1.7% of the population.

There were 151 households, of which 33.8% had children under the age of 18 living with them, 40.4% were married couples living together, 19.9% had a female householder with no husband present, 7.9% had a male householder with no wife present, and 31.8% were non-families. 29.1% of all households were made up of individuals, and 15.2% had someone living alone who was 65 years of age or older. The average household size was 2.40 and the average family size was 2.82.

The median age in the town was 38.8 years. 27.1% of residents were under the age of 18; 6% were between the ages of 18 and 24; 25.6% were from 25 to 44; 26% were from 45 to 64; and 15.2% were 65 years of age or older. The gender makeup of the town was 47.5% male and 52.5% female.

=== 2000 census ===
As of the census of 2000, there were 420 people, 184 households, and 117 families living in the town. The population density was 1,477.5 inhabitants per square mile (570.5/km^{2}). There were 207 housing units at an average density of 729.9 per square mile (281.8/km^{2}). The racial makeup of the town was 99.52% White, 0.24% African American and 0.24% Native American. Hispanic or Latino of any race were 0.95% of the population.

There were 184 households, out of which 28.8% had children under the age of 18 living with them, 54.9% were married couples living together, 7.6% had a female householder with no husband present, and 36.4% were non-families. 31.5% of all households were made up of individuals, and 13.6% had someone living alone who was 65 years of age or older. The average household size was 2.28 and the average family size was 2.86.

In the town, the population was spread out, with 22.0% under the age of 18, 9.1% from 18 to 24, 32.7% from 25 to 44, 21.7% from 45 to 64, and 14.6% who were 65 years of age or older. The median age was 37 years. For every 100 females, there were 94.0 males. For every 100 females age 18 and over, there were 99.4 males.

The median income for a household in the town was $36,042, and the median income for a family was $39,327. Males had a median income of $28,068 versus $25,500 for females. The per capita income for the town was $17,930. About 6.0% of families and 9.3% of the population were below the poverty line, including 18.3% of those under age 18 and 6.3% of those age 65 or over.

== Education ==
It is in the South Vermillion Community School Corporation. That school district operates South Vermillion High School.
