= Len Gilmore =

American baseball player (1917–2011)

- Pitcher
- Born: November 3, 1917; Fairview Park, Indiana, U.S.
- Died: February 18, 2011 (aged 93); Oklahoma City, Oklahoma, U.S.
- Batted: Right Threw: Right

MLB debut
- October 1, 1944, for the Pittsburgh Pirates

Last appearance
- October 1, 1944, for the Pittsburgh Pirates

MLB statistics
- Win–loss record: 0–1
- Earned run average: 7.88
- Strikeouts: 0
- Stats at Baseball Reference

Teams
- Pittsburgh Pirates (1944)

Leonard Preston Gilmore [Meow] (November 3, 1917 – February 18, 2011) was an American pitcher in Major League Baseball who appeared in one game for the Pittsburgh Pirates in the 1944 season. Listed at 6 ft 3 in (1.91 m), 175 lb (79 kg), Gilmore batted and threw right-handed.

He was born in Fairview Park, Indiana and graduated from Clinton High School, also in Indiana. His father worked in the mines and his mother was a native of Austria.

After high school, Gilmore played freshman baseball at Indiana State University before embarking on an intermittent minor league baseball career. Gilmore expected to be drafted during World War II but was found to be physically unfit for service. In 1943, he tried out for the Pirates during spring training at their camp in Muncie, Indiana and was signed to a contract. He spent the 1943 and 1944 seasons in the minors with the Albany Senators. He was called up to the majors for the first time after the 1944 Eastern League season ended.

On the last day of the 1944 season, he got the opportunity to start the second game of a doubleheader against the Philadelphia Phillies at Shibe Park. Gilmore was credited with the loss, as he allowed seven earned runs on 13 hits, without walks or strikeouts in eight innings of work. Following the season, he was traded to the Oakland Oaks of the Pacific Coast League for Ken Gables. In Oakland, he was managed by Casey Stengel who he would later describe as the only man he ever hated.

Gilmore also pitched eleven minor league seasons, playing between 1938 and 1952 for nine teams in nine different leagues. He posted a combined 128–94 record and a 3.66 earned run average in 332 pitching appearances.

Gilmore several of the final seasons of his professional career in Oklahoma and eventually made his home in Jones, Oklahoma. Following his baseball career, Gilmore worked for the Oklahoma City Fire Department, retiring as a captain in 1970.

Gilmore married his wife, Virginia, in 1950 and had two daughters with her. Gilmore died in Oklahoma City on February 18, 2011, at the age of 93. At the time of his death, he was one of the oldest living major leaguers.

== See also ==
- 1944 Pittsburgh Pirates season
