= Syndicate, Indiana =

- Unincorporated community
- Vermillion County's location in Indiana

- Syndicate's location in Vermillion County
- Coordinates: 39°37′02″N 87°24′51″W
- Country: United States
- State: Indiana
- County: Vermillion
- Township: Clinton
- Elevation: 614 ft (187 m)
- Time zone: UTC-5 (Eastern (EST))
  - Summer (DST): UTC-4 (EDT)
- ZIP code: 47842
- Area code: 765
- GNIS feature ID: 444528

Syndicate is an unincorporated community in Clinton Township, Vermillion County, in the U.S. state of Indiana.

== History ==
According to Ronald L. Baker, Syndicate probably took its name from a nearby mine. The place was known as "Rhoads," but became "better known as Syndicate mine."

As of 1919, there was a school at Syndicate, which closed for a time during the Spanish flu epidemic.

During Prohibition, law enforcement officials told a local newspaper that "Syndicate moonshiners are among the most up-to-date booze handlers in the business," employing a 150-gallon still and 20-barrel concrete vats.

== Geography ==
Syndicate is located at 39°37′2″N 87°24′51″W.
