= Rileysburg, Indiana =

- Unincorporated community
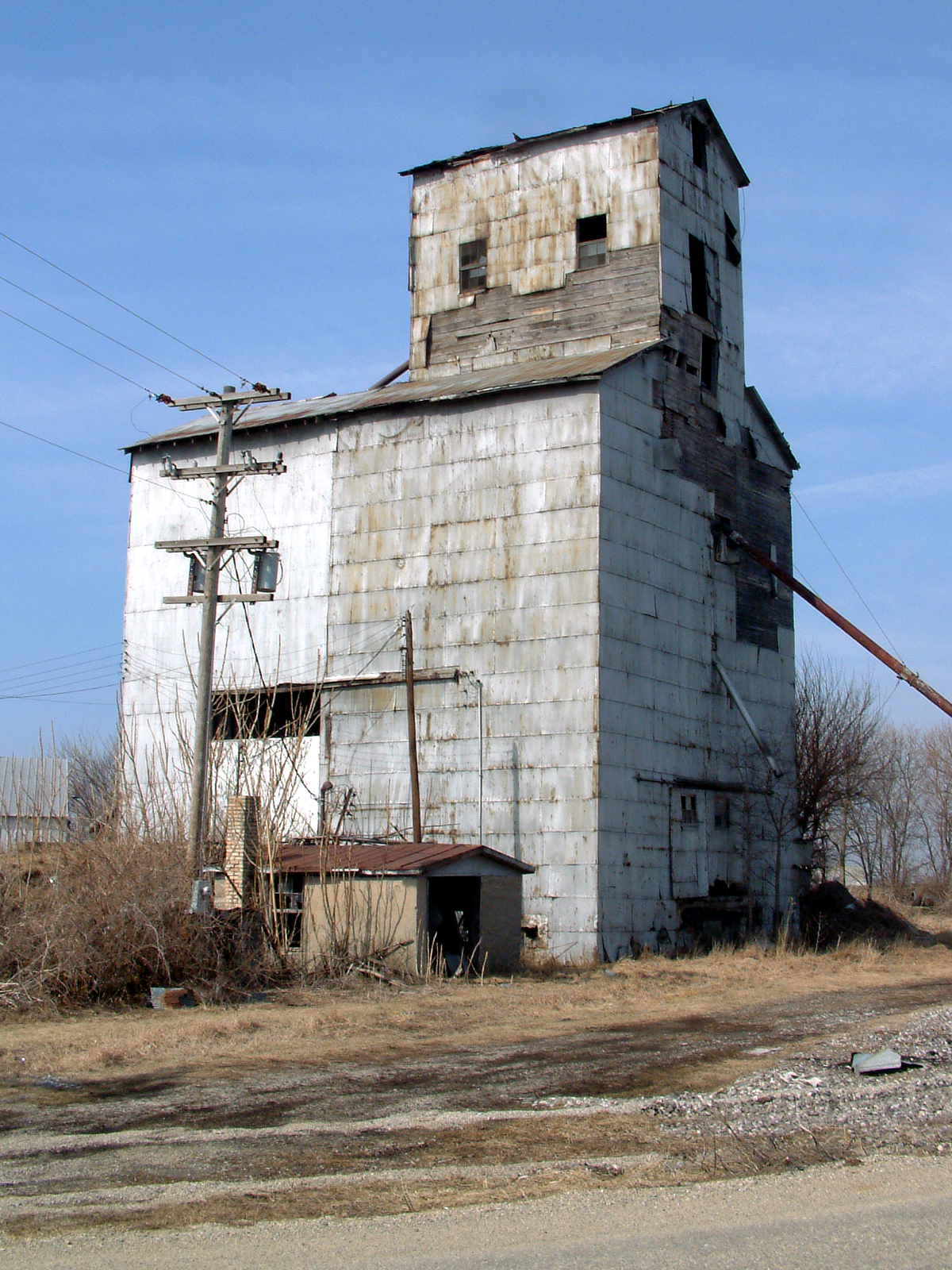
- The old Rileysburg grain elevator

- Vermillion County's location in Indiana

- Rileysburg's location in Vermillion County
- Coordinates: 40°06′15″N 87°31′33″W
- Country: United States
- State: Indiana
- County: Vermillion
- Township: Highland
- Elevation: 650 ft (198 m)
- Time zone: UTC-5 (Eastern (EST))
  - Summer (DST): UTC-4 (EDT)
- ZIP code: 47932
- Area code: 765
- GNIS feature ID: 442041

Rileysburg is a small unincorporated community in Highland Township, Vermillion County, in the U.S. state of Indiana. The town is served by the post office in Covington in nearby Fountain County. The county seat is located in Newport.

== History ==
A post office was established at Rileysburg in 1887, and remained in operation until it was discontinued in 1934. The town plat was officially filed in 1904.

== Geography ==
Rileysburg is located in the far northwest part of the county, 1 mile (1.6 km) south of Interstate 74 and about .25 miles (0.40 km) east of the Indiana-Illinois state line. A CSX Transportation railway runs northwest through town into nearby Danville, Illinois. Coal Branch Creek, which flows south through the county to the Vermilion River, has its head near Rileysburg.
