= Helt Township, Vermillion County, Indiana =

Helt Township
- Township
- Location in Vermillion County
- Coordinates: 39°45′32″N 87°27′21″W
- Country: United States
- State: Indiana
- County: Vermillion

Government
  - Type: Indiana township

Area
  - Total: 72.18 sq mi (186.9 km^{2})
  - Land: 71.64 sq mi (185.5 km^{2})
  - Water: 0.54 sq mi (1.4 km^{2}) 0.75%
- Elevation: 650 ft (198 m)

Population (2020)
  - Total: 2,493
  - Density: 34.80/sq mi (13.44/km^{2})
- Time zone: UTC-5 (Eastern (EST))
  - Summer (DST): UTC-4 (EDT)
- ZIP codes: 47842, 47847, 47854
- Area code: 765
- GNIS feature ID: 453404

Helt Township is one of five townships in Vermillion County, Indiana, United States. As of the 2020 census, its population was 2,493 (down from 2,610 at 2010) and it contained 1,107 housing units.

== History ==
Helt Township was named for Daniel Helt, a pioneer who settled in Vermillion County in 1818.

The Possum Bottom Covered Bridge and Salem Methodist Episcopal Church are listed on the National Register of Historic Places.

== Geography ==
According to the 2010 census, the township has a total area of 72.18 square miles (186.9 km^{2}), of which 71.64 square miles (185.5 km^{2}) (or 99.25%) is land and 0.54 square miles (1.4 km^{2}) (or 0.75%) is water.

=== Cities ===
- Dana

=== Unincorporated towns ===
- Alta at 39.7722603°N 87.3866837°W
- Bono at 39.7603143°N 87.4939082°W
- Highland at 39.7944824°N 87.3958502°W
- Hillsdale at 39.7858714°N 87.3902947°W
- Jonestown at 39.7092028°N 87.5039089°W
- Saint Bernice at 39.7092027°N 87.5214094°W
- Summit Grove at 39.7244822°N 87.3891843°W

(This list is based on USGS data and may include former settlements.)

=== Extinct towns ===
- Early Station at 39.7633714°N 87.3852949°W
- Montezuma Station at 39.7950382°N 87.3866834°W
- Randall at 39.7747585°N 87.5225199°W
- Toronto at 39.7817032°N 87.4955747°W
- West Dana at 39.8030920°N 87.5244640°W

=== Cemeteries ===
The township contains nine cemeteries: Andrews, Bales, Bogart, Dinsmore, Helts Prairie, Higbie, Highland, Hollingsworth and Pisgah.

=== Landmarks ===
- Miller Park

== School districts ==
- South Vermillion Community School Corporation

== Political districts ==
- Indiana's 8th congressional district
- State House District 42
- State Senate District 38
