= Fairview Park, Indiana =

- Town
- Flag

- Location of Fairview Park in Vermillion County, Indiana.

- Map of Fairview Park
- Coordinates: 39°40′55″N 87°24′51″W
- Country: United States
- State: Indiana
- County: Vermillion
- Township: Clinton

Area
  - Total: 0.87 sq mi (2.26 km^{2})
  - Land: 0.87 sq mi (2.26 km^{2})
  - Water: 0 sq mi (0.00 km^{2})
- Elevation: 499 ft (152 m)

Population (2020)
  - Total: 1,409
  - Density: 1,611.6/sq mi (622.25/km^{2})
- Time zone: UTC-5 (EST)
  - Summer (DST): UTC-5 (EST)
- ZIP code: 47842
- Area code: 765
- FIPS code: 18-22576
- GNIS feature ID: 2396933
- Website: fpi.homestead.com

Fairview Park is a town in Clinton Township, Vermillion County, in the U.S. state of Indiana. As of the 2020 census, Fairview Park had a population of 1,409.

== History ==
Fairview Park was platted in 1902.

== Geography ==
Fairview Park is located in the southeastern part of the county. Once a separate town, Fairview Park is now adjacent to the north end of the city of Clinton. Indiana State Road 63 passes through the town from northeast to southwest.

According to the 2010 census, Fairview Park has a total area of 0.88 square miles (2.28 km^{2}), all land.

=== Climate ===
The climate in this area is characterized by hot, humid summers and generally mild to cool winters. According to the Köppen Climate Classification system, Fairview Park has a humid subtropical climate, abbreviated "Cfa" on climate maps.

== Demographics ==
Historical population
| Census | Pop. | Note | %± |
|---|---|---|---|
| 1910 | 630 | | — |
| 1920 | 1,301 | | 106.5% |
| 1930 | 1,106 | | −15.0% |
| 1940 | 1,074 | | −2.9% |
| 1950 | 902 | | −16.0% |
| 1960 | 1,039 | | 15.2% |
| 1970 | 1,067 | | 2.7% |
| 1980 | 1,545 | | 44.8% |
| 1990 | 1,446 | | −6.4% |
| 2000 | 1,496 | | 3.5% |
| 2010 | 1,386 | | −7.4% |
| 2020 | 1,409 | | 1.7% |
U.S. Decennial Census

=== 2020 census ===
As of the 2020 census, Fairview Park had a population of 1,409. The median age was 46.9 years. 18.9% of residents were under the age of 18 and 24.0% of residents were 65 years of age or older. For every 100 females there were 94.6 males, and for every 100 females age 18 and over there were 93.7 males age 18 and over.

99.2% of residents lived in urban areas, while 0.8% lived in rural areas.

There were 633 households in Fairview Park, of which 25.9% had children under the age of 18 living in them. Of all households, 46.8% were married-couple households, 18.2% were households with a male householder and no spouse or partner present, and 27.5% were households with a female householder and no spouse or partner present. About 32.2% of all households were made up of individuals and 14.4% had someone living alone who was 65 years of age or older.

There were 678 housing units, of which 6.6% were vacant. The homeowner vacancy rate was 0.2% and the rental vacancy rate was 8.5%.

Racial composition as of the 2020 census
| Race | Number | Percent |
|---|---|---|
| White | 1,357 | 96.3% |
| Black or African American | 4 | 0.3% |
| American Indian and Alaska Native | 2 | 0.1% |
| Asian | 3 | 0.2% |
| Native Hawaiian and Other Pacific Islander | 0 | 0.0% |
| Some other race | 4 | 0.3% |
| Two or more races | 39 | 2.8% |
| Hispanic or Latino (of any race) | 10 | 0.7% |

=== 2010 census ===
As of the census of 2010, there were 1,386 people, 609 households, and 406 families living in the town. The population density was 1,575.0 inhabitants per square mile (608.1/km^{2}). There were 676 housing units at an average density of 768.2 per square mile (296.6/km^{2}). The racial makeup of the town was 98.2% White, 0.1% African American, 0.1% Native American, 0.2% Asian, 0.1% Pacific Islander, 0.6% from other races, and 0.5% from two or more races. Hispanic or Latino of any race were 0.8% of the population.

There were 609 households, of which 26.4% had children under the age of 18 living with them, 54.4% were married couples living together, 9.2% had a female householder with no husband present, 3.1% had a male householder with no wife present, and 33.3% were non-families. 29.7% of all households were made up of individuals, and 11.6% had someone living alone who was 65 years of age or older. The average household size was 2.28 and the average family size was 2.78.

The median age in the town was 41.9 years. 20.9% of residents were under the age of 18; 7.7% were between the ages of 18 and 24; 23.2% were from 25 to 44; 31.2% were from 45 to 64; and 16.9% were 65 years of age or older. The gender makeup of the town was 50.7% male and 49.3% female.

=== 2000 census ===
As of the census of 2000, there were 1,496 people, 634 households, and 436 families living in the town. The population density was 1,652.4 inhabitants per square mile (638.0/km^{2}). There were 680 housing units at an average density of 751.1 per square mile (290.0/km^{2}). The racial makeup of the town was 96.66% White, 0.53% African American, 0.13% Native American, 0.60% from other races, and 2.07% from two or more races. Hispanic or Latino of any race were 1.40% of the population.

There were 634 households, out of which 29.8% had children under the age of 18 living with them, 56.9% were married couples living together, 9.3% had a female householder with no husband present, and 31.1% were non-families. 26.7% of all households were made up of individuals, and 9.5% had someone living alone who was 65 years of age or older. The average household size was 2.36 and the average family size was 2.86.

In the town, the population was spread out, with 22.4% under the age of 18, 8.6% from 18 to 24, 27.4% from 25 to 44, 28.1% from 45 to 64, and 13.5% who were 65 years of age or older. The median age was 40 years. For every 100 females, there were 97.9 males. For every 100 females age 18 and over, there were 94.1 males.

The median income for a household in the town was $36,078, and the median income for a family was $43,542. Males had a median income of $39,000 versus $21,667 for females. The per capita income for the town was $21,459. About 8.2% of families and 10.1% of the population were below the poverty line, including 14.4% of those under age 18 and 8.1% of those age 65 or over.

== Law enforcement and fire protection ==
The Fairview Park Town Marshal's Office provides law enforcement to the town and the city of Clinton per request. Fire protection is covered by the Fairview Park Fire Department. The fire house shares a building with the town hall located at 281 S Washington Street. It houses 3 frontline apparatus and one hooker.

== Education ==
It is in the South Vermillion Community School Corporation. That school district operates South Vermillion High School.

== Notable person ==
- Len Gilmore, pitcher in Major League Baseball
