= Summit Grove, Indiana =

- Unincorporated community
- Vermillion County's location in Indiana

- Summit Grove's location in Vermillion County
- Coordinates: 39°43′28″N 87°23′21″W
- Country: United States
- State: Indiana
- County: Vermillion
- Township: Helt
- Elevation: 522 ft (159 m)
- Time zone: UTC-5 (Eastern (EST))
  - Summer (DST): UTC-4 (EDT)
- ZIP code: 47842
- Area code: 765
- GNIS feature ID: 444396

Summit Grove is an unincorporated community in Helt Township, Vermillion County, in the U.S. state of Indiana.

== History ==
Summit Grove was platted in 1871. A post office was established at Summit Grove in 1871, and remained in operation until it was discontinued in 1911.

== Geography ==
Summit Grove is located at 39°43′28″N 87°23′21″W.
