= Highland Township, Vermillion County, Indiana =

Highland Township
- Township
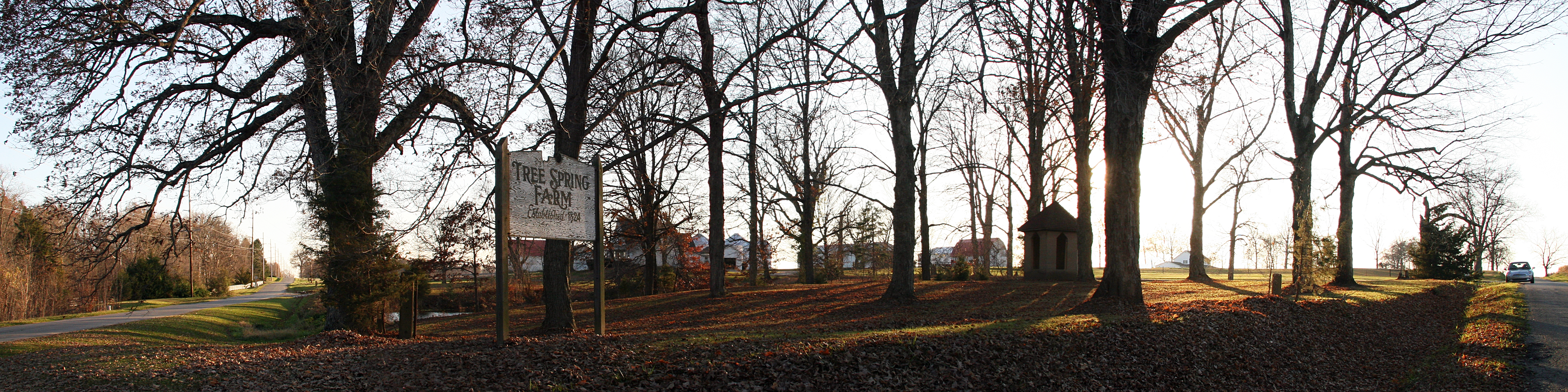
- Tree Spring in northeastern Highland Township

- Location in Vermillion County
- Coordinates: 40°04′46″N 87°28′32″W
- Country: United States
- State: Indiana
- County: Vermillion

Government
  - Type: Indiana township

Area
  - Total: 55.07 sq mi (142.6 km^{2})
  - Land: 54.54 sq mi (141.3 km^{2})
  - Water: 0.53 sq mi (1.4 km^{2}) 0.96%
- Elevation: 620 ft (190 m)

Population (2020)
  - Total: 1,492
  - Density: 27.36/sq mi (10.56/km^{2})
- Time zone: UTC-5 (Eastern (EST))
  - Summer (DST): UTC-4 (EDT)
- ZIP codes: 47928, 47932, 47974
- Area code: 765
- GNIS feature ID: 453413

Highland Township is one of five townships in Vermillion County, Indiana, United States. As of the 2020 census, its population was 1,492 (down from 1,534 at 2010) and it contained 703 housing units.

== Geography ==
According to the 2010 census, the township has a total area of 55.07 square miles (142.6 km^{2}), of which 54.54 square miles (141.3 km^{2}) (or 99.04%) is land and 0.53 square miles (1.4 km^{2}) (or 0.96%) is water.

=== Cities ===
- Perrysville

=== Unincorporated towns ===
- Gessie at 40.0825372°N 87.4997387°W
- Rileysburg at 40.1042037°N 87.5258506°W

(This list is based on USGS data and may include former settlements.)

=== Cemeteries ===
The township contains ten cemeteries: Ater, Chenoweth, Harrison, Hicks, Hopewell, Hughes, Lower Mound, Skinner, Mathes and Smith.

=== Airports and landing strips ===
- Highland Airport (closed)

=== Rivers ===
- Wabash River
- Vermilion River

=== Highways ===
- Interstate 74
- U.S. Route 136
- Indiana State Road 63
- Indiana State Road 32

== School districts ==
- North Vermillion Community School Corporation

== Political districts ==
- Indiana's 8th congressional district
- State House District 42
- State Senate District 38
