= 1988 United States presidential election in Indiana =

- November 8, 1988
- Turnout: 60.4% ▲0.5 pp

Nominee	George H. W. Bush	Michael Dukakis
Party	Republican	Democratic
Home state	Texas	Massachusetts
Running mate	Dan Quayle	Lloyd Bentsen
Electoral vote	12	0
Popular vote	1,297,763	860,643
Percentage	59.84%	39.69%

Bush
50–60%
60–70%
70–80%
80–90%
90–100%
Dukakis
50–60%
60–70%
70–80%
80–90%
90–100%
Other
Tie
No vote
President before election
Ronald Reagan
Republican
Elected President
George H.W Bush
Republican

A presidential election was held in Indiana on November 8, 1988, as part of the 1988 United States presidential election. The Republican ticket of the vice president of the United States George H. W. Bush and the junior U.S. senator from Indiana Dan Quayle defeated the Democratic ticket of the governor of Massachusetts Michael Dukakis and the senior U.S. senator from Texas Lloyd Bentsen. Bush defeated Dukakis in the national election with 426 electoral votes.

== Primary elections ==
=== Republican Party ===
Indiana Republican primary, May 3, 1988
Party	Candidate	Votes	%
Republican	George H. W. Bush	351,829	80.39
Republican	Bob Dole (withdrawn)	42,878	9.80
Republican	Pat Robertson (withdrawn)	28,712	6.56
Republican	Jack Kemp (withdrawn)	14,236	3.25
Total votes		437,655	100.00

=== Democratic Party ===
Indiana Democratic primary, May 3, 1988
Party	Candidate	Votes	%
Democratic	Michael Dukakis	449,495	69.61
Democratic	Jesse Jackson	145,021	22.46
Democratic	Al Gore (withdrawn)	21,865	3.39
Democratic	Dick Gephardt (withdrawn)	16,777	2.60
Democratic	Paul Simon (withdrawn)	12,550	1.94
Total votes		645,708	100.00

== General election ==
=== Results ===
1988 United States presidential election in Indiana
Party	Candidate	Votes	%	±%
Republican	George H. W. Bush Dan Quayle	1,297,763	59.84	▼1.83
Democratic	Michael Dukakis Lloyd Bentsen	860,643	39.69	▲2.01
New Alliance	Lenora Fulani Mamie Moore	10,215	0.47	▲0.47
Total votes		2,168,621	100.00	

=== Results by county ===
1988 United States presidential election in Indiana by county
County	George H. W. Bush Republican		Michael Dukakis Democratic		Lenora Fulani New Alliance		Margin		Total
County	Votes	%	Votes	%	Votes	%	Votes	%	Total
Adams	8,137	67.83%	3,811	31.77%	49	0.41%	4,326	36.06%	11,997
Allen	74,638	64.94%	39,238	34.14%	1,059	0.92%	35,400	30.80%	114,935
Bartholomew	17,364	66.05%	8,804	33.49%	123	0.47%	8,560	32.56%	26,291
Benton	2,698	66.31%	1,349	33.15%	22	0.54%	1,349	33.16%	4,069
Blackford	3,336	59.49%	2,253	40.17%	19	0.34%	1,083	19.32%	5,608
Boone	11,608	73.44%	4,168	26.37%	30	0.19%	7,440	47.07%	15,806
Brown	3,348	60.86%	2,115	38.45%	38	0.69%	1,233	22.41%	5,501
Carroll	4,981	62.54%	2,952	37.07%	31	0.39%	2,029	25.47%	7,964
Cass	10,970	65.10%	5,784	34.32%	97	0.58%	5,186	30.78%	16,851
Clark	16,544	53.04%	14,528	46.58%	120	0.38%	2,016	6.46%	31,192
Clay	5,852	60.77%	3,724	38.67%	53	0.55%	2,128	22.10%	9,629
Clinton	8,570	65.82%	4,412	33.88%	39	0.30%	4,158	31.94%	13,021
Crawford	2,532	55.09%	2,036	44.30%	28	0.61%	496	10.79%	4,596
Daviess	6,768	65.75%	3,483	33.84%	43	0.42%	3,285	31.91%	10,294
Dearborn	8,195	61.57%	5,066	38.06%	48	0.36%	3,129	23.51%	13,309
Decatur	6,245	67.35%	2,979	32.13%	48	0.52%	3,266	35.22%	9,272
DeKalb	9,018	65.75%	4,657	33.95%	41	0.30%	4,361	31.80%	13,716
Delaware	27,348	56.84%	20,548	42.71%	216	0.45%	6,800	14.13%	48,112
Dubois	9,995	62.28%	5,954	37.10%	99	0.62%	4,041	25.18%	16,048
Elkhart	33,793	70.11%	14,236	29.54%	171	0.35%	19,557	40.57%	48,200
Fayette	5,949	58.85%	4,118	40.74%	41	0.41%	1,831	18.11%	10,108
Floyd	14,291	56.28%	11,024	43.41%	78	0.31%	3,267	12.87%	25,393
Fountain	5,113	60.57%	3,279	38.85%	49	0.58%	1,834	21.72%	8,441
Franklin	4,777	65.70%	2,472	34.00%	22	0.30%	2,305	31.70%	7,271
Fulton	5,234	65.01%	2,788	34.63%	29	0.36%	2,446	30.38%	8,051
Gibson	7,610	51.83%	7,031	47.88%	43	0.29%	579	3.95%	14,684
Grant	18,441	62.79%	10,799	36.77%	131	0.45%	7,642	26.02%	29,371
Greene	7,689	55.94%	5,979	43.50%	78	0.57%	1,710	12.44%	13,746
Hamilton	36,654	80.36%	8,853	19.41%	108	0.24%	27,801	60.95%	45,615
Hancock	13,374	71.21%	5,355	28.51%	51	0.27%	8,019	42.70%	18,780
Harrison	6,702	57.47%	4,933	42.30%	26	0.22%	1,769	15.17%	11,661
Hendricks	22,090	74.12%	7,643	25.65%	70	0.23%	14,447	48.47%	29,803
Henry	11,280	59.01%	7,779	40.69%	57	0.30%	3,501	18.32%	19,116
Howard	19,971	63.16%	11,518	36.43%	131	0.41%	8,453	26.73%	31,620
Huntington	11,675	74.87%	3,873	24.84%	46	0.29%	7,802	50.03%	15,594
Jackson	9,470	62.77%	5,550	36.78%	68	0.45%	3,920	25.99%	15,088
Jasper	6,009	64.67%	3,237	34.84%	46	0.50%	2,772	29.83%	9,292
Jay	5,363	62.22%	3,212	37.26%	45	0.52%	2,151	24.96%	8,620
Jefferson	6,949	56.64%	5,221	42.56%	98	0.80%	1,728	14.08%	12,268
Jennings	5,636	60.29%	3,667	39.23%	45	0.48%	1,969	21.06%	9,348
Johnson	24,654	72.99%	9,001	26.65%	123	0.36%	15,653	46.34%	33,778
Knox	9,813	58.13%	7,006	41.50%	62	0.37%	2,807	16.63%	16,881
Kosciusko	17,761	76.68%	5,321	22.97%	81	0.35%	12,440	53.71%	23,163
LaGrange	4,495	68.67%	2,029	31.00%	22	0.34%	2,466	37.67%	6,546
Lake	79,929	43.03%	105,026	56.55%	780	0.42%	-25,097	-13.52%	185,735
LaPorte	20,537	53.64%	17,585	45.93%	163	0.43%	2,952	7.71%	38,285
Lawrence	10,742	64.71%	5,787	34.86%	70	0.42%	4,955	29.85%	16,599
Madison	32,596	56.95%	24,443	42.70%	202	0.35%	8,153	14.25%	57,241
Marion	184,519	58.56%	128,627	40.82%	1,949	0.62%	55,892	17.74%	315,095
Marshall	10,490	65.41%	5,488	34.22%	60	0.37%	5,002	31.19%	16,038
Martin	3,066	58.75%	2,132	40.85%	21	0.40%	934	17.90%	5,219
Miami	8,533	64.47%	4,613	34.85%	90	0.68%	3,920	29.62%	13,236
Monroe	20,756	56.04%	15,855	42.81%	427	1.15%	4,901	13.23%	37,038
Montgomery	10,793	74.58%	3,623	25.03%	56	0.39%	7,170	49.55%	14,472
Morgan	14,284	72.38%	5,375	27.23%	77	0.39%	8,909	45.15%	19,736
Newton	3,274	65.02%	1,744	34.64%	17	0.34%	1,530	30.38%	5,035
Noble	7,889	65.26%	4,143	34.27%	57	0.47%	3,746	30.99%	12,089
Ohio	1,412	55.79%	1,113	43.97%	6	0.24%	299	11.82%	2,531
Orange	5,245	65.44%	2,739	34.17%	31	0.39%	2,506	31.27%	8,015
Owen	3,837	60.30%	2,484	39.04%	42	0.66%	1,353	21.26%	6,363
Parke	4,458	63.21%	2,563	36.34%	32	0.45%	1,895	26.87%	7,053
Perry	4,720	49.27%	4,804	50.15%	56	0.58%	-84	-0.88%	9,580
Pike	3,294	51.70%	3,037	47.67%	40	0.63%	257	4.03%	6,371
Porter	29,790	60.37%	19,390	39.29%	165	0.33%	10,400	21.08%	49,345
Posey	5,987	57.07%	4,468	42.59%	35	0.33%	1,519	14.48%	10,490
Pulaski	3,677	62.14%	2,213	37.40%	27	0.46%	1,464	24.74%	5,917
Putnam	7,119	64.59%	3,850	34.93%	52	0.47%	3,269	29.66%	11,021
Randolph	6,856	62.85%	3,990	36.58%	62	0.57%	2,866	26.27%	10,908
Ripley	6,414	63.81%	3,605	35.87%	32	0.32%	2,809	27.94%	10,051
Rush	5,112	67.41%	2,451	32.32%	20	0.26%	2,661	35.09%	7,583
Scott	3,455	50.41%	3,378	49.29%	21	0.31%	77	1.12%	6,854
Shelby	10,176	65.14%	5,382	34.45%	63	0.40%	4,794	30.69%	15,621
Spencer	4,964	54.82%	4,061	44.85%	30	0.33%	903	9.97%	9,055
St. Joseph	49,481	50.56%	48,056	49.10%	327	0.33%	1,425	1.46%	97,864
Starke	4,458	51.80%	4,104	47.69%	44	0.51%	354	4.11%	8,606
Steuben	6,855	68.55%	3,114	31.14%	31	0.31%	3,741	37.41%	10,000
Sullivan	4,246	49.39%	4,320	50.25%	31	0.36%	-74	-0.86%	8,597
Switzerland	1,572	51.39%	1,479	48.35%	8	0.26%	93	3.04%	3,059
Tippecanoe	27,897	62.88%	16,256	36.64%	211	0.48%	11,641	26.24%	44,364
Tipton	5,148	67.15%	2,485	32.42%	33	0.43%	2,663	34.73%	7,666
Union	1,814	65.49%	946	34.15%	10	0.36%	868	31.34%	2,770
Vanderburgh	38,928	55.02%	31,270	44.20%	555	0.78%	7,658	10.82%	70,753
Vermillion	3,674	47.27%	4,044	52.03%	54	0.69%	-370	-4.76%	7,772
Vigo	21,929	53.11%	19,192	46.48%	172	0.42%	2,737	6.63%	41,293
Wabash	9,153	68.39%	4,168	31.14%	63	0.47%	4,985	37.25%	13,384
Warren	2,243	59.04%	1,542	40.59%	14	0.37%	701	18.45%	3,799
Warrick	10,504	56.58%	7,999	43.09%	61	0.33%	2,505	13.49%	18,564
Washington	4,998	59.39%	3,370	40.04%	48	0.57%	1,628	19.35%	8,416
Wayne	16,388	61.37%	10,209	38.23%	105	0.39%	6,179	23.14%	26,702
Wells	7,712	68.93%	3,437	30.72%	39	0.35%	4,275	38.21%	11,188
White	6,220	65.38%	3,256	34.23%	37	0.39%	2,964	31.15%	9,513
Whitley	7,679	67.44%	3,642	31.99%	65	0.57%	4,037	35.45%	11,386
TOTAL	1,297,763	59.84%	860,643	39.69%	10,215	0.47%	437,120	20.15%	2,168,621

==== Counties that flipped from Republican to Democratic ====
- Perry
- Sullivan
- Vermillion

== See also ==
- United States presidential elections in Indiana

== Bibliography ==
- Congressional Quarterly (2010). Congressional Quarterly's Guide to U.S. Elections (6th ed.). Washington D.C.: Congressional Quarterly.
- Hogsett, Joseph H. (1988). 1988 Election Report State of Indiana. Indianapolis: Indiana Secretary of State.
- Jennings, Jerry T. (1989). Voting and Registration in the Election of November 1988. Washington, D.C.: United States Department of Commerce.
