= Perrysville, Indiana =

- Town
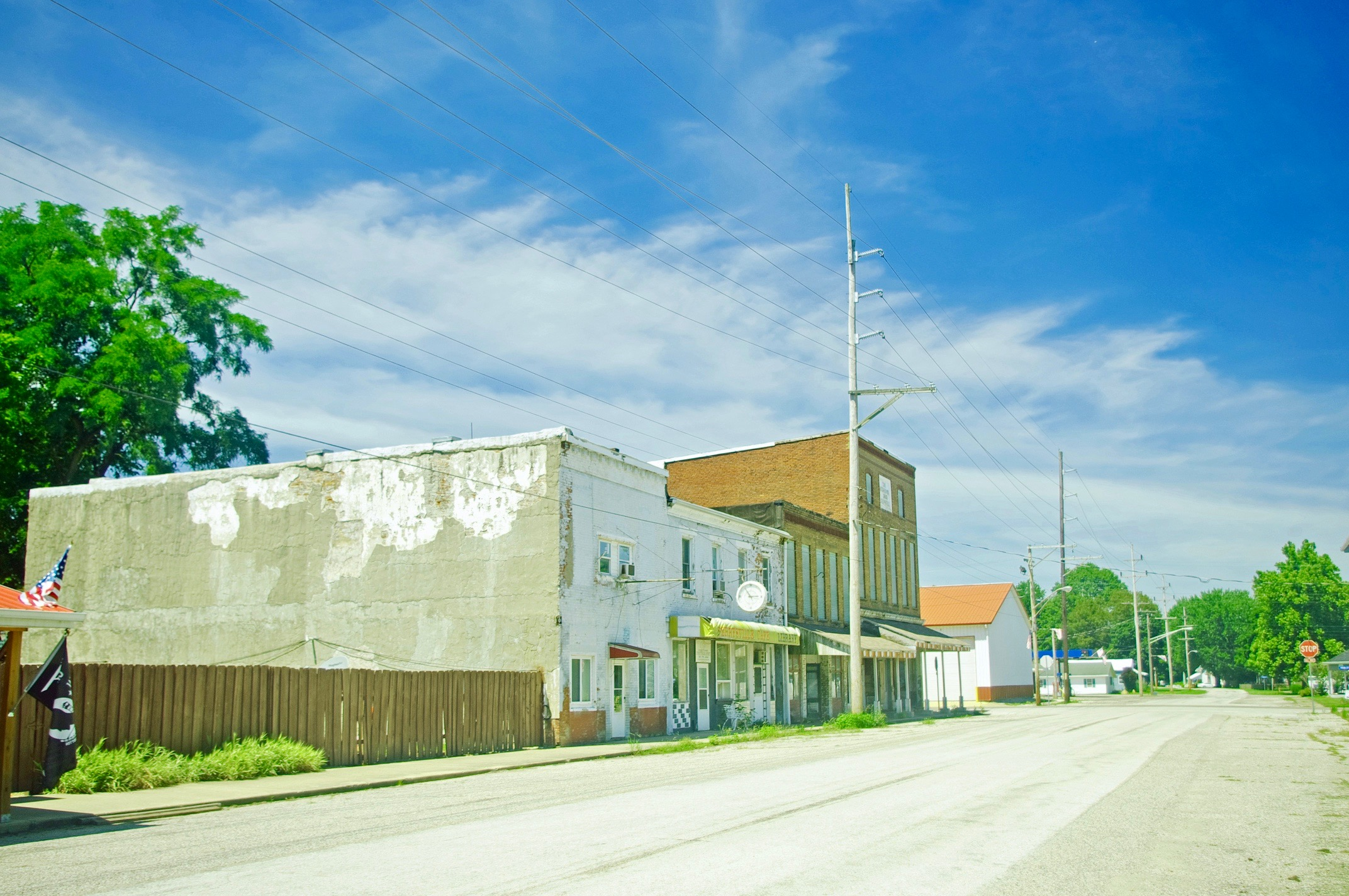
- Jackson Street in Perrysville

- Location of Perrysville in Vermillion County, Indiana.

- Map of Perrysville
- Coordinates: 40°03′12″N 87°26′09″W
- Country: United States
- State: Indiana
- County: Vermillion
- Township: Highland
- Founded: 1825

Area
  - Total: 0.26 sq mi (0.67 km^{2})
  - Land: 0.26 sq mi (0.67 km^{2})
  - Water: 0 sq mi (0.00 km^{2})
- Elevation: 545 ft (166 m)

Population (2020)
  - Total: 456
  - Density: 1,773.5/sq mi (684.77/km^{2})
- Time zone: UTC-5 (Eastern (EST))
  - Summer (DST): UTC-4 (EDT)
- ZIP code: 47974
- Area code: 765
- FIPS code: 18-59238
- GNIS feature ID: 2396854
- Website: www.perrysville.in.gov

Perrysville is a town in Highland Township, Vermillion County, in the U.S. state of Indiana. As of the 2020 census, Perrysville had a population of 456.

== History ==
Perrysville was platted and surveyed in 1825 by James Blair on a bluff on the west side of the Wabash River. The town is named for Commodore Oliver Hazard Perry, the hero of the Battle of Lake Erie. It became a local center for shipping products to New Orleans on flatboats via the Wabash, Ohio, and Mississippi Rivers, and it was also able to receive heavy equipment and manufactured items on steamboats. Prior to the advent of the railroad in the second half of the nineteenth century, the town's location on the river made for a thriving community; it is reputed to have been the largest town between Chicago and Terre Haute at the height of its success. The arrival of the Wabash and Erie Canal enhanced its importance even further; a sidecut with locks allowed boats to be towed across the river to the town. Various roads intersected here, including a plank toll road from Danville, Illinois to the west, and stagecoach traffic became frequent. However, when the railroads did arrive, and failed to pass through the town, it spelled the eventual end of the vital river traffic, and of the importance of the town of Perrysville.

The Perrysville post office has been in operation since 1827.

== Geography ==
Perrysville is located in the northeast part of the county on the western banks of the Wabash River. Indiana State Road 32 passes through the town.

According to the 2010 census, Perrysville has a total area of 0.26 square miles (0.67 km^{2}), all land.

== Demographics ==
Historical population
Census	Pop.	Note	%±
1850	742		—
1860	721		−2.8%
1870	690		−4.3%
1880	645		−6.5%
1890	507		−21.4%
1930	435		—
1940	451		3.7%
1950	462		2.4%
1960	497		7.6%
1970	510		2.6%
1980	532		4.3%
1990	443		−16.7%
2000	502		13.3%
2010	456		−9.2%
2020	456		0.0%
U.S. Decennial Census

=== 2010 census ===
As of the census of 2010, there were 456 people, 184 households, and 127 families living in the town. The population density was 1,753.8 inhabitants per square mile (677.1/km^{2}). There were 208 housing units at an average density of 800.0 per square mile (308.9/km^{2}). The racial makeup of the town was 98.2% White, 0.4% African American, 0.2% Asian, and 1.1% from two or more races. Hispanic or Latino of any race were 0.2% of the population.

There were 184 households, of which 32.1% had children under the age of 18 living with them, 52.7% were married couples living together, 13.0% had a female householder with no husband present, 3.3% had a male householder with no wife present, and 31.0% were non-families. 28.3% of all households were made up of individuals, and 12.5% had someone living alone who was 65 years of age or older. The average household size was 2.48 and the average family size was 3.00.

The median age in the town was 40.2 years. 25% of residents were under the age of 18; 7.9% were between the ages of 18 and 24; 24.4% were from 25 to 44; 26.4% were from 45 to 64; and 16.4% were 65 years of age or older. The gender makeup of the town was 45.6% male and 54.4% female.

=== 2000 census ===
As of the census of 2000, there were 502 people, 198 households, and 139 families living in the town. The population density was 1,995.4 inhabitants per square mile (770.4/km^{2}). There were 208 housing units at an average density of 826.8 per square mile (319.2/km^{2}). The racial makeup of the town was 99.40% White, and 0.60% from two or more races.

There were 198 households, out of which 30.8% had children under the age of 18 living with them, 59.6% were married couples living together, 6.6% had a female householder with no husband present, and 29.3% were non-families. 24.2% of all households were made up of individuals, and 11.1% had someone living alone who was 65 years of age or older. The average household size was 2.54 and the average family size was 3.04.

In the town, the population was spread out, with 25.5% under the age of 18, 9.6% from 18 to 24, 27.7% from 25 to 44, 25.3% from 45 to 64, and 12.0% who were 65 years of age or older. The median age was 37 years. For every 100 females, there were 104.9 males. For every 100 females age 18 and over, there were 104.4 males.

The median income for a household in the town was $33,929, and the median income for a family was $36,667. Males had a median income of $29,583 versus $22,969 for females. The per capita income for the town was $15,455. About 5.1% of families and 9.2% of the population were below the poverty line, including 12.4% of those under age 18 and 6.8% of those age 65 or over.

== Education ==
It is in the North Vermillion Community School Corporation. That school district operates North Vermillion High School.

== Notable people ==
- Luella F. McWhirter (1859–1952), philanthropist, clubwoman, and temperance leader
