= Vermillion Township, Vermillion County, Indiana =

Vermillion Township
- Township
- Location in Vermillion County
- Coordinates: 39°52′16″N 87°27′19″W
- Country: United States
- State: Indiana
- County: Vermillion

Government
  - Type: Indiana township

Area
  - Total: 50.98 sq mi (132.0 km^{2})
  - Land: 50.51 sq mi (130.8 km^{2})
  - Water: 0.47 sq mi (1.2 km^{2}) 0.92%
- Elevation: 610 ft (186 m)

Population (2020)
  - Total: 856
  - Density: 16.9/sq mi (6.54/km^{2})
- Time zone: UTC-5 (Eastern (EST))
  - Summer (DST): UTC-4 (EDT)
- ZIP codes: 47847, 47854 47928, 47966
- Area code: 765
- GNIS feature ID: 453954

Vermillion Township is one of five townships in Vermillion County, Indiana, United States. As of the 2020 census, its population was 856 (down from 924 at 2010) and it contained 406 housing units.

== History ==
Vermillion Township took its name from Vermillion County, which was named after the Vermilion River.

== Geography ==
According to the 2010 census, the township has a total area of 50.98 square miles (132.0 km^{2}), of which 50.51 square miles (130.8 km^{2}) (or 99.08%) is land and 0.47 square miles (1.2 km^{2}) (or 0.92%) is water.

=== Cities ===
- Newport

=== Unincorporated towns ===
- Quaker at 39.8558700°N 87.5280748°W

(This list is based on USGS data and may include former settlements.)

=== Cemeteries ===
The township contains twelve cemeteries: Carmack, Johnson, Johnson, Juliet, Lebanon, Memorial Chapel, Miller, Old Hopewell, Thomas, Walnut Hill, Wimsett and Zener.

=== Landmarks ===
- Newport Chemical Depot
- The Newport Covered Bridge was listed on the National Register of Historic Places in 1994.

== School districts ==
- North Vermillion Community School Corporation

== Political districts ==
- Indiana's 8th congressional district
- State House District 42
- State Senate District 38
