= Centenary, Indiana =

- Unincorporated community
- Vermillion County's location in Indiana

- Centenary's location in Vermillion County
- Coordinates: 39°39′33″N 87°28′17″W
- Country: United States
- State: Indiana
- County: Vermillion
- Township: Clinton
- Elevation: 607 ft (185 m)
- Time zone: UTC-5 (Eastern (EST))
  - Summer (DST): UTC-4 (EDT)
- ZIP code: 47842
- Area code: 765
- GNIS feature ID: 2830561

Centenary is an unincorporated community in Clinton Township, Vermillion County, in the U.S. state of Indiana.

== History ==
The town was laid out in 1910 and may have been named for a local church.

== Demographics ==
The United States Census Bureau delineated Centenary as a census designated place in the 2022 American Community Survey.
