= Clinton Township, Vermillion County, Indiana =

Clinton Township
- Township
- Location in Vermillion County
- Coordinates: 39°38′56″N 87°27′26″W
- Country: United States
- State: Indiana
- County: Vermillion

Government
  - Type: Indiana township

Area
  - Total: 46.35 sq mi (120.0 km^{2})
  - Land: 45.25 sq mi (117.2 km^{2})
  - Water: 1.1 sq mi (2.8 km^{2}) 2.37%
- Elevation: 584 ft (178 m)

Population (2020)
  - Total: 8,884
  - Density: 196.3/sq mi (75.80/km^{2})
- Time zone: UTC-5 (Eastern (EST))
  - Summer (DST): UTC-4 (EDT)
- ZIP codes: 47842, 47884
- Area code: 765
- GNIS feature ID: 453234

Clinton Township is one of five townships in Vermillion County, Indiana, United States. As of the 2020 census, its population was 8,884 (down from 9,119 at 2010) and it contained 4,226 housing units.

== History ==
Clinton Township was named for DeWitt Clinton, the sixth Governor of New York.

== Geography ==
According to the 2010 census, the township has a total area of 46.35 square miles (120.0 km^{2}), of which 45.25 square miles (117.2 km^{2}) (or 97.63%) is land and 1.1 square miles (2.8 km^{2}) (or 2.37%) is water.

=== Cities ===
- Clinton
- Fairview Park
- Universal

=== Unincorporated towns ===
- Blanford at 39.6650358°N 87.5205765°W
- Centenary at 39.6583695°N 87.4733532°W
- Crompton Hill at 39.6558703°N 87.4191856°W
- Easytown at 39.6105912°N 87.5002987°W
- Klondyke at 39.6694812°N 87.4366858°W
- Needmore at 39.6189258°N 87.4102969°W
- Rhodes at 39.6094812°N 87.4130749°W
- Sandytown at 39.6819811°N 87.4461303°W
- Syndicate at 39.6172590°N 87.4141859°W

(This list is based on USGS data and may include former settlements.)

=== Cemeteries ===
The township contains eight cemeteries: Bono, Gorton, Hall, Jackson, Riverside, Shirley, Spangler and Walnut Grove.

=== Lakes ===
- Mc Donald Lake

=== Landmarks ===
- Sportland Park

== School districts ==
- South Vermillion Community School Corporation

== Political districts ==
- Indiana's 8th congressional district
- State House District 42
- State Senate District 38
