= Clinton Airport =

Airport in Indiana, United States

- IATA: none; ICAO: none; FAA LID: 1I7

Summary
- Airport type: Public use
- Owner: White Construction Inc.
- Serves: Clinton, Indiana
- Elevation AMSL: 526 ft (160 m)
- Coordinates: 39°42′45″N 87°24′05″W

Maps
- Location of Vermillion County in Indiana

- Location of airport in Vermillion County

Runways
Direction	Length		Surface
Direction	ft	m	Surface
18/36	3,750	1,143	Asphalt

Statistics (2004)
- Aircraft operations: 6,026
- Based aircraft: 11
- Source: Federal Aviation Administration

Clinton Airport (FAA LID: 1I7) was a privately owned, public-use airport located 3 nautical miles (5.6 km; 3.5 mi) north of the central business district of Clinton, a city in Vermillion County, Indiana, United States.

== Facilities and aircraft ==
Clinton Airport covers an area of 120 acres (49 ha) at an elevation of 526 feet (160 m) above mean sea level. It has one runway designated 18/36 with a 3,750 by 40 ft (1,143 x 12 m) asphalt surface.

For the 12-month period ending December 31, 2004, the airport had 6,026 general aviation aircraft operations, an average of 16 per day. At that time there were 11 single-engine aircraft based at this airport.

== Airport Closure ==
As of May 1, 2017, an FAA NOTAM indicates that the Clinton Airport is permanently closed.
