= Union Hospital (Indiana) =

Geography
- Location: 1606 N 7th St, Terre Haute, IN 47804, Terre Haute, Indiana, United States
- Coordinates: 39.485850°N 87.407107°W

Organization
- Type: Teaching
- Affiliated university: None

History
- Founded: 1892

Links
- Website: http://myunionhospital.org
- Lists: Hospitals in Indiana

Union Hospital is a not-for-profit healthcare system in west central Indiana. Its main facility is in Terre Haute, Indiana.

== History ==
Union Hospital was founded August 11, 1892 as the Terre Haute Sanitarium by Dr. Benjamin F. Swafford and Dr. Leo J. Weinstein. The name was changed in 1895 to Union Home for Invalids after the two doctors donated half of their holdings to a group of citizens of various Protestant and Jewish backgrounds.

In 1900 a nurse named Sister Johanna M Baur, superintendent of the building, organized a Training School for Nurses, which would graduate more than nine hundred nurses before it closed in 1965. The school also collaborated to train nursing students from Indiana State University.

The hospital made its first large expansion in the 1920s, constructing a new seven-story building. An addition was added in 1952.

Noted nurse and aviator Ellen Church joined the hospital in 1951 as the Director of Nursing, and soon was promoted to Hospital Administrator. She served the hospital in this position from 1952 to 1964. Church was tasked to economize the hospital's budget, of which she successfully enacted. Under her leadership, financial stability of the hospital was achieved thanks to her advocacy for expansion and the purchasing of new medical equipment.

Since the early 1960s, the hospital has maintained a partnership with Indiana State University, where both institutions collaborate with the School of Nursing and related programs.

Beginning in the 1960s, physicians Dr. Thomas Conway and Dr. William Scully researched groundbreaking practices of infant care to develop a new neonatal program. The Indiana Board of Health advised them to stop their mission, but the hospital superintendent supported their search. Soon, they asked the hospital board to train nurses at Yale University, in order to implement these practices in Terre Haute. Eventually, by 1968 the new Neonatal Intensive Care Unit (NICU) was established, and it quickly reduced the number of deaths from 15 per 1,000 to 6 per 1,000.

Union Hospital began managing the Vermillion County Hospital in Clinton, Indiana, in 1996 with the encouragement of the Indiana State Department of Health, renaming the hospital Union Hospital Clinton.
