= Salem Methodist Episcopal Church (Clinton, Indiana) =

Historic church in Indiana, United States

- U.S. National Register of Historic Places
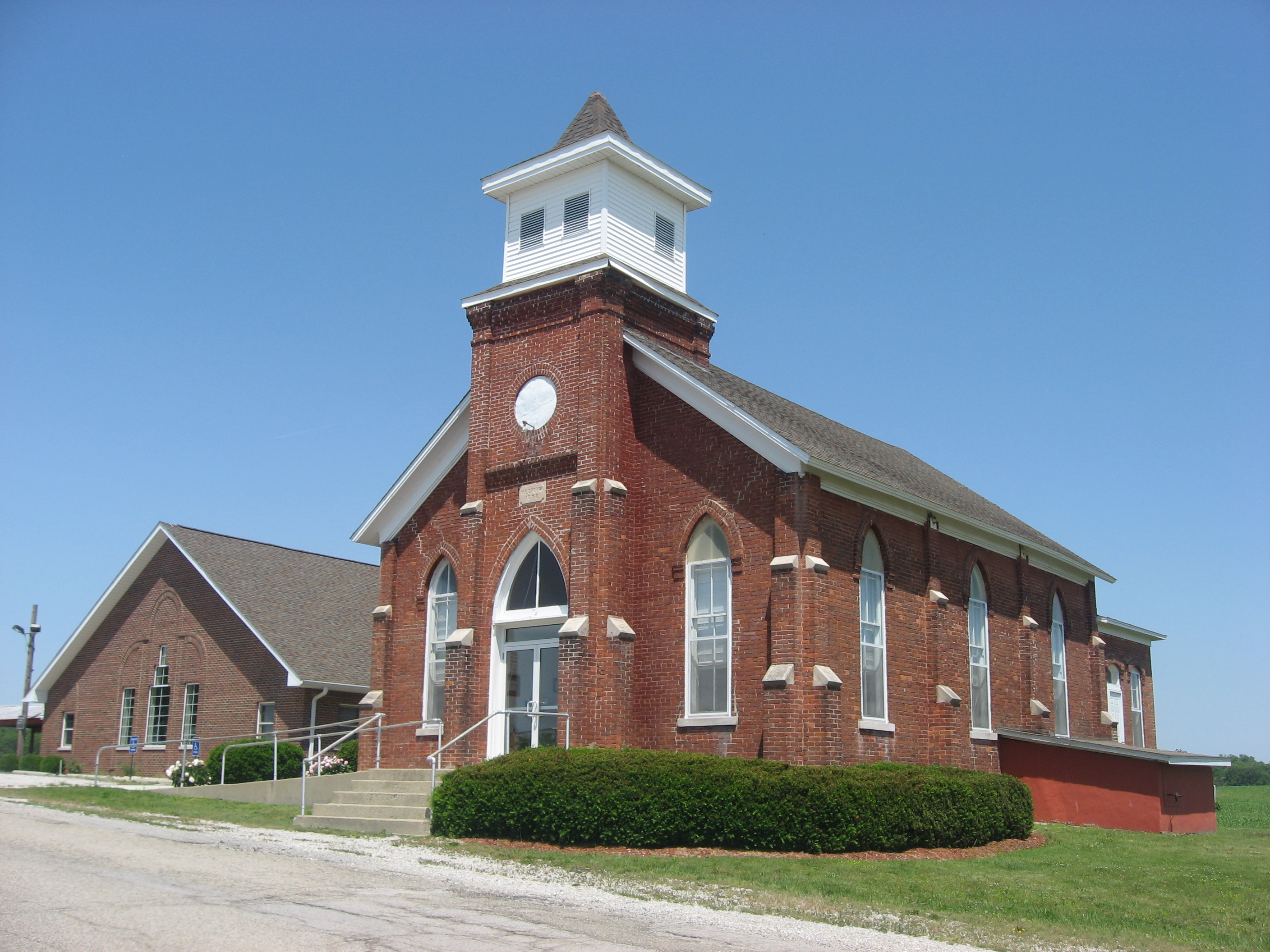

- Location within Vermillion County, Indiana Location within Indiana Location within the United States
- Nearest city: North of Clinton on State Road 63, Helt Township, Vermillion County, Indiana
- Coordinates: 39°43′55″N 87°23′58″W
- Area: less than one acre
- Built: 1878
- Architectural style: Gothic
- NRHP reference No.: 79000022
- Added to NRHP: February 22, 1979

Salem Methodist Episcopal Church, also known as Salem United Methodist Church, is a historic United Methodist church in Helt Township, Vermillion County, Indiana. The church was built in 1878 to house Vermillion County's first Methodist congregation, which was established in the 1820s. The brick church was designed in the Gothic Revival style. The front of the church features a brick tower topped with a truncated roof and a bell tower. The church's windows and front entrance have a pointed arch design.

The church was added to the National Register of Historic Places on February 22, 1979.
