= Toronto, Indiana =

- Ghost town
- Vermillion County's location in Indiana

- Toronto's location in Vermillion County
- Coordinates: 39°46′54″N 87°29′44″W
- Country: United States
- State: Indiana
- County: Vermillion
- Township: Helt
- Elevation: 636 ft (194 m)
- Time zone: UTC-5 (Eastern (EST))
  - Summer (DST): UTC-4 (EDT)
- ZIP code: 47847
- Area code: 765
- GNIS feature ID: 452163

Toronto is an extinct town in Helt Township, Vermillion County, in the U.S. state of Indiana. The site is on Indiana State Road 71 near the Illinois and Indiana border.

A few buildings in the community exist, and it is still cited by the USGS.

== History ==
A post office was established at Toronto in 1838, and remained in operation until it was discontinued in 1912.

== Geography ==
Toronto is located at 39°46′54″N 87°29′44″W.
