= Clinton Municipal Airport =

Clinton Municipal Airport may refer to:

- Clinton Municipal Airport (Arkansas) in Clinton, Arkansas, United States (FAA: CCA)
- Clinton Municipal Airport (Iowa) in Clinton, Iowa, United States (FAA: CWI)
