= Blanford, Indiana =

- Census-designated place
- Location of Blanford in Vermillion County, Indiana.
- Coordinates: 39°40′05″N 87°31′14″W
- Country: United States
- State: Indiana
- County: Vermillion
- Township: Clinton

Area
  - Total: 0.73 sq mi (1.90 km^{2})
  - Land: 0.73 sq mi (1.90 km^{2})
  - Water: 0 sq mi (0.00 km^{2})
- Elevation: 558 ft (170 m)

Population (2020)
  - Total: 280
  - Density: 381.4/sq mi (147.26/km^{2})
- Time zone: UTC-5 (Eastern (EST))
  - Summer (DST): UTC-4 (EDT)
- ZIP code: 47842
- Area code: 765
- GNIS feature ID: 2629869

Blanford is a census-designated place in Clinton Township, Vermillion County, in the U.S. state of Indiana.

As of the 2020 census, Blanford had a population of 280.

== History ==
Blanford was laid out in 1912. The community was named for L. S. Blanford, who owned the land where the village is located. A post office has been in operation at Blanford since 1915.

In January 1923, there was an expulsion of the small African American community of the old mining town after an ultimatum was issued at a meeting of over 400 white residents for all African Americans to leave town or turn over the African American that had allegedly assaulted an 11-year-old girl. There was a shootout at a dance hall shortly afterwards where the Sheriff of Vermillion County, Harry Newland, was investigating shots fired at the last two African Americans remaining in town. Newland and his deputies shot and killed three white miners who opened fire on them. Six white men were charged with inciting a riot after the shootout.

== Demographics ==
Historical population
Census	Pop.	Note	%±
2020	280		—
U.S. Decennial Census

== Education ==
It is in the South Vermillion Community School Corporation. That school district operates South Vermillion High School.

== See also ==
- Margaret Gisolo
