= Quaker, Indiana =

- Unincorporated community
- Vermillion County's location in Indiana

- Quaker's location in Vermillion County
- Coordinates: 39°51′48″N 87°31′40″W
- Country: United States
- State: Indiana
- County: Vermillion
- Township: Vermillion
- Elevation: 633 ft (193 m)
- Time zone: UTC-5 (Eastern (EST))
  - Summer (DST): UTC-4 (EDT)
- ZIP code: 47847
- Area code: 765
- GNIS feature ID: 441682

Quaker (or Quaker Point) is an unincorporated community in Vermillion Township, Vermillion County, in the U.S. state of Indiana.

== History ==
The post office at Quaker was established in 1894 and discontinued in 1914. The community was originally built up chiefly by Quakers.

== Geography ==
Quaker is located at 39°51′48″N 87°31′40″W.
