= Hillsdale, Indiana =

- Unincorporated community
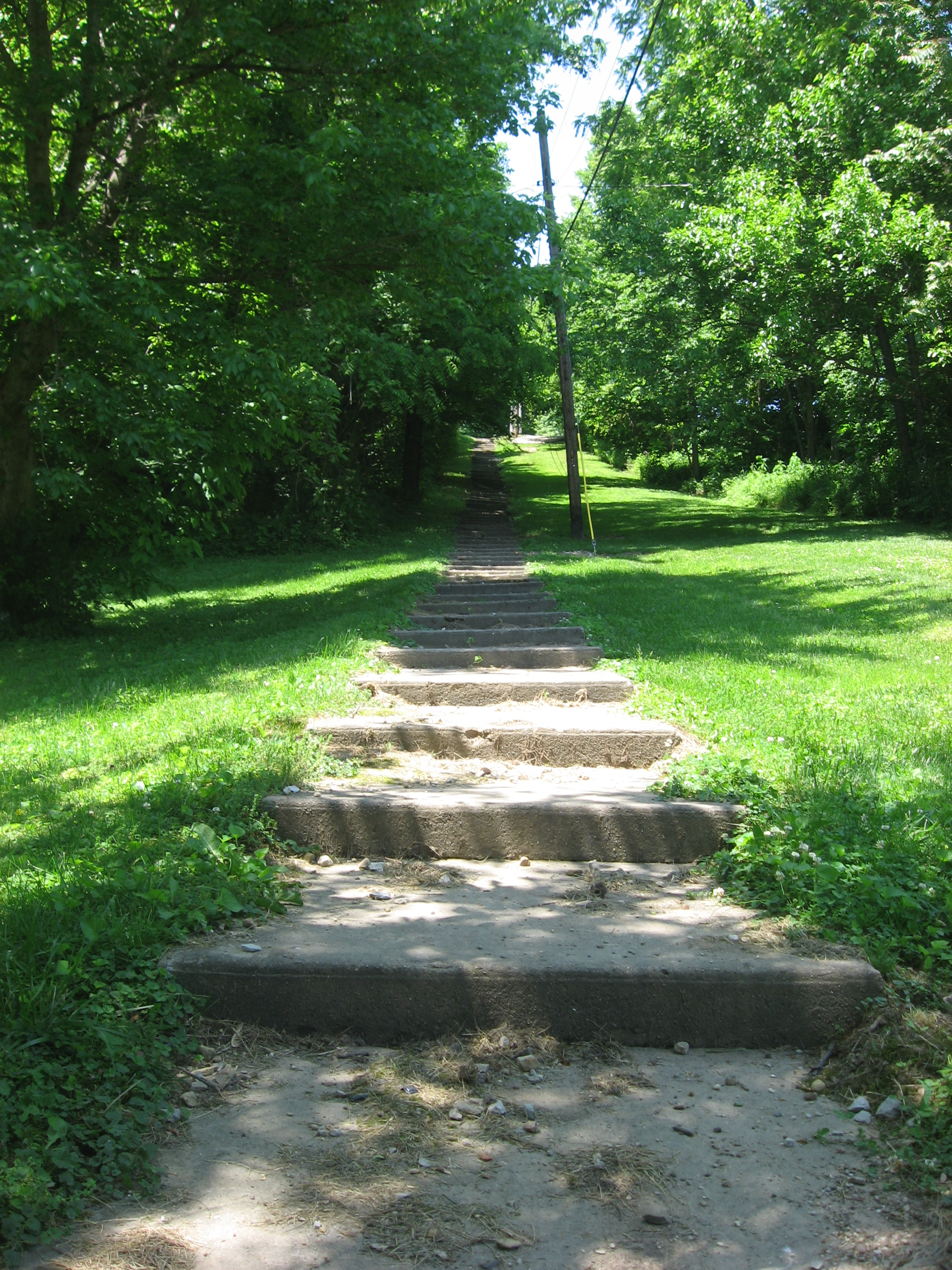
- The Hillsdale Steps, a community landmark

- Vermillion County's location in Indiana

- Hillsdale's location in Vermillion County
- Coordinates: 39°47′04″N 87°23′30″W
- Country: United States
- State: Indiana
- County: Vermillion
- Township: Helt
- Established: 1873
- Elevation: 591 ft (180 m)
- Time zone: UTC-5 (Eastern (EST))
  - Summer (DST): UTC-4 (EDT)
- ZIP code: 47854
- Area code: 765
- GNIS feature ID: 2830563

Hillsdale is an unincorporated community in Helt Township, Vermillion County, in the U.S. state of Indiana.

== History ==
A post office has been in operation at Hillsdale since 1872. The town was laid out in 1873. The community was so named on account of its lofty elevation. Its early businesses were located at the bottom of the hill, near the railroad depot, but most of the houses were built higher up on the hillside. This elevation difference complicated movement between the two sections of the community, so in 1903 the Hillsdale Steps were built on the hillside to improve foot transportation.

== Geography ==
Hillsdale is located on the western banks of the Wabash River.

== Demographics ==
The United States Census Bureau delineated Hillsdale as a census designated place in the 2022 American Community Survey.
