= Saint Bernice, Indiana =

- Census-designated place
- Location of St. Bernice in Vermillion County, Indiana.
- Coordinates: 39°42′34″N 87°31′12″W
- Country: United States
- State: Indiana
- County: Vermillion
- Township: Helt

Area
  - Total: 1.79 sq mi (4.63 km^{2})
  - Land: 1.79 sq mi (4.63 km^{2})
  - Water: 0 sq mi (0.00 km^{2})
- Elevation: 571 ft (174 m)

Population (2020)
  - Total: 595
  - Density: 332.7/sq mi (128.47/km^{2})
- Time zone: UTC-5 (Eastern (EST))
  - Summer (DST): UTC-4 (EDT)
- ZIP code: 47875
- Area code: 765
- GNIS feature ID: 2629868

Saint Bernice is an unincorporated census-designated place in Helt Township, Vermillion County, in the U.S. state of Indiana. It had a population of 646 at the 2010 census.

== History ==
A post office has been in operation at Saint Bernice since 1867. The plat was filed in 1905. The origin of the name Saint Bernice is obscure.

== Demographics ==
Historical population
Census	Pop.	Note	%±
2020	595		—
U.S. Decennial Census

== Education ==
It is in the South Vermillion Community School Corporation. That school district operates South Vermillion High School.
