= Vermillion County, Indiana =

County in Indiana, United States

- County
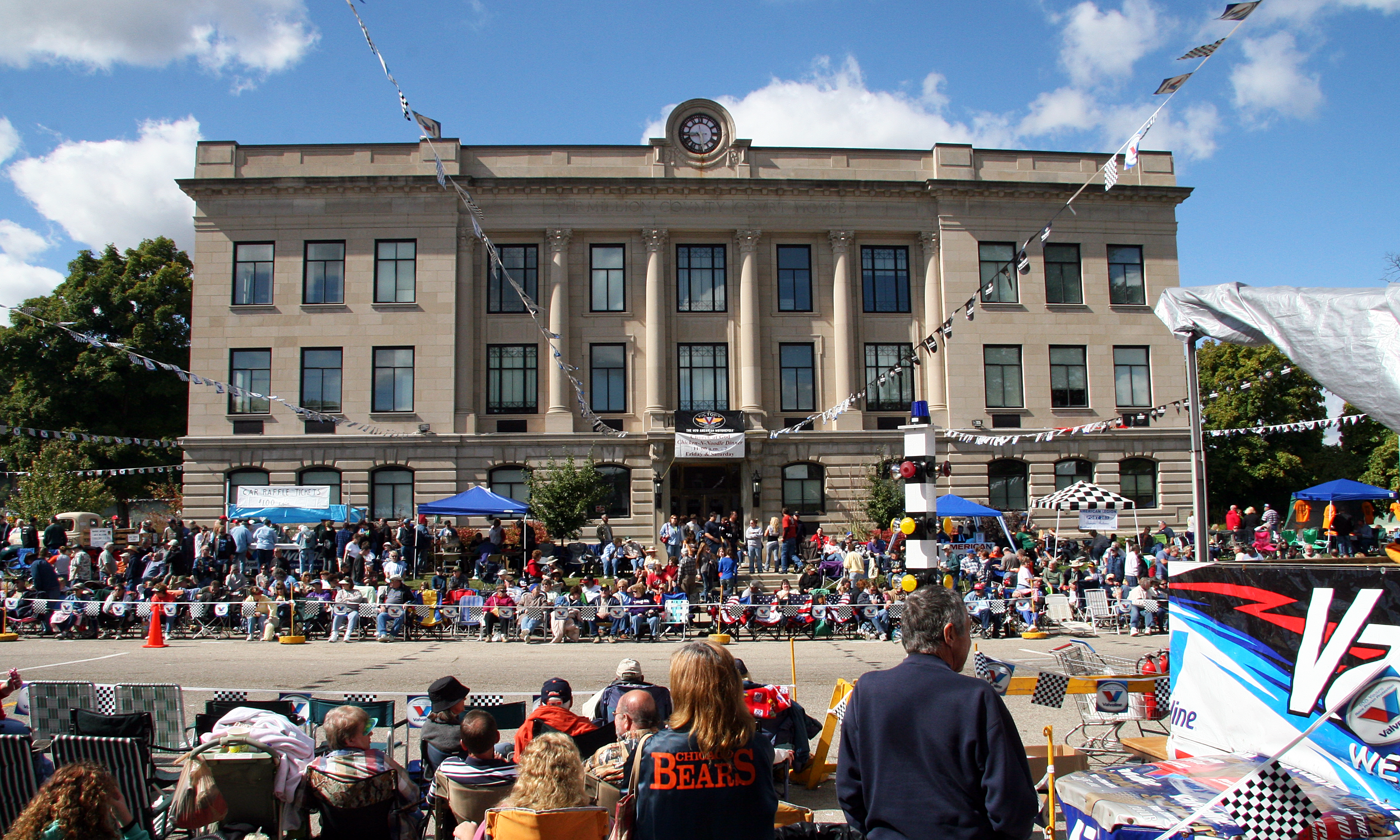
- The Vermillion County Courthouse in Newport

- Seal

- Location within the U.S. state of Indiana
- Coordinates: 39°51′N 87°28′W
- Country: United States
- State: Indiana
- Founded: February 1, 1824
- Named for: Vermilion River
- Seat: Newport
- Largest city: Clinton

Area
  - Total: 259.93 sq mi (673.2 km^{2})
  - Land: 256.88 sq mi (665.3 km^{2})
  - Water: 3.05 sq mi (7.9 km^{2}) 1.17%

Population (2020)
  - Total: 15,439
  - Estimate (2025): 15,488 ▲
  - Density: 60.102/sq mi (23.206/km^{2})
- Time zone: UTC−5 (Eastern)
  - Summer (DST): UTC−4 (EDT)
- Congressional district: 8th
- Website: www.vermilliongov.us
- Indiana county number 83

Vermillion County lies in the western part of the U.S. state of Indiana between the Illinois border and the Wabash River. As of the 2020 census, the population was 15,439. The county seat is Newport. It was officially established in 1824 and was the fiftieth Indiana county created. Vermillion County is included in the Terre Haute metropolitan area. The county contains seven incorporated towns with a total population of about 9,900, as well as several unincorporated communities; it is also divided into five townships which provide local services. An interstate highway, two U.S. routes, and five state roads cross the county, as does a major railroad line.

== History ==
The first settlers in the area arrived in 1816, the same year that the state of Indiana was established. Vigo County was formed in 1818 and included the area that later became Parke and Vermillion counties. In 1821, Parke County was formed, and on January 2, 1824, the Indiana General Assembly created Vermillion County out of Parke County; the act took effect on February 1. The county seat was established at Newport later that year.

The county was named for the southbound Vermilion River, which flows nearby. The name is spelled in the French/Commonwealth English style with a double letter "l", in contrast to the American English spelling of the adjacent Vermilion County, Illinois. This is one of only a few cases in the United States in which a county borders a county with the same name in another state.

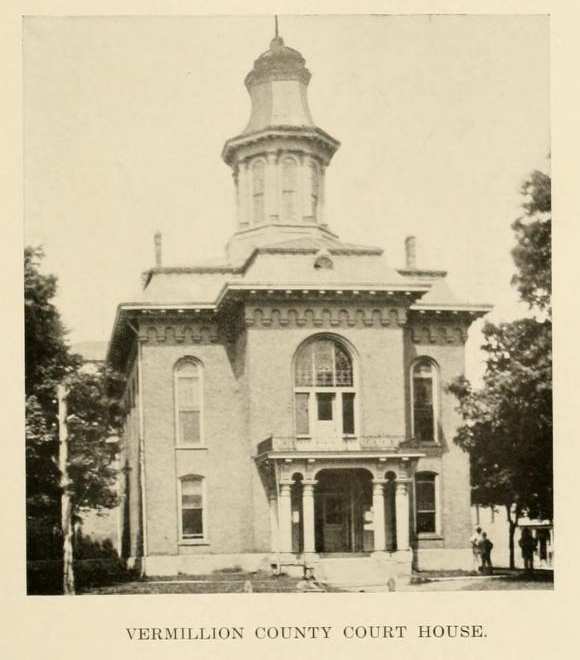
The county courthouse which served from 1868 to 1923

The first courthouse was a frame building. The contract was awarded in June 1824 for $345 (Note: A $345 capital expense in 1824 would be roughly equivalent to $229,000 in 2009.) and was to be completed by the following November; it was used for county business until a brick building could be constructed. The brick courthouse was contracted in 1831; the completed building was used until January 29, 1844, when the building caught fire. It was repaired and served until 1868 when a third courthouse was built at a cost of $30,000; (Note: A $30,000 capital expense in 1868 would be roughly equivalent to $6,410,000 in 2009.) a west wing was added in 1903 at a cost of $28,000. (Note: A $28,000 capital expense in 1903 would be roughly equivalent to $4,000,000 in 2009.) That building was struck by lightning early on the morning of May 27, 1923, and was largely destroyed by fire. Construction on the fourth (and current) courthouse began that same year; Halbert Fillinger and John Bayard were the architects. The stone building was constructed by Jasper Good of Columbus at a cost of $358,707, and the new courthouse was dedicated on June 11, 1925. (Note: A $350,000 capital expense in 1925 would be roughly equivalent to $21,000,000 in 2009.)

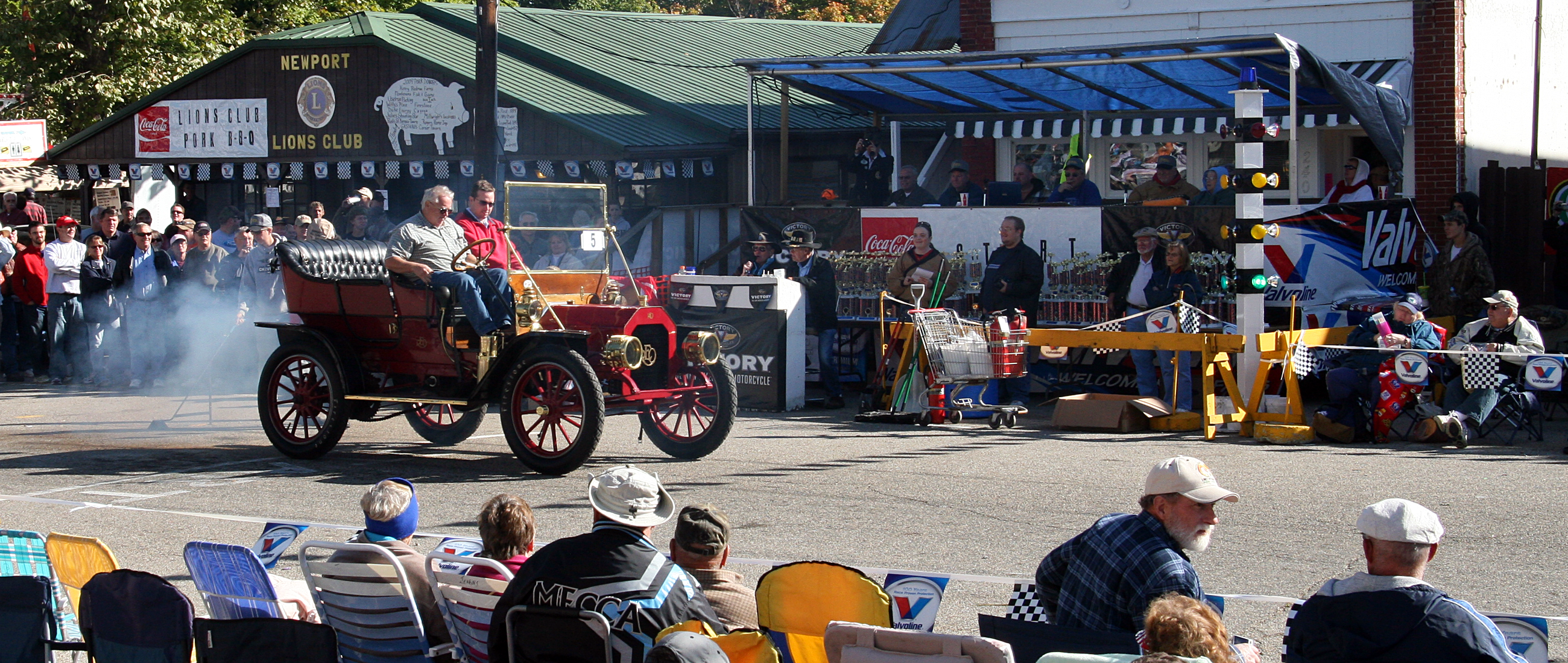
An REO leaves the hill climb starting line

The Newport Hill Climb was first held in 1909. The event was started and stopped several times over the years, but the Newport Lions Club now runs the Newport Antique Auto Hill Climb; it has been held continuously since the 1960s and involves several hundred cars each year.

On January 26, 2017, the wooden grandstand at the Vermillion County Fairgrounds was destroyed by a massive fire. The wooden grandstand was built in 1933 as a WPA work project, and was the oldest wooden grandstand in Indiana. The Cayuga Fire Department said that the cause of the fire is suspicious.

== Geography ==
Map of Vermillion County

Vermillion County is less than 10 miles (16 km) from east to west at its widest point, but it extends over 37 miles (60 km) from north to south. It shares a 6.5-mile (10.5 km) border with Warren County to the north. Its eastern border is defined by the Wabash River. Fountain and Parke counties lie across the river to the northeast and southeast, respectively. Vermillion County is the southernmost county in Indiana entirely on the right bank of the Wabash. Vigo County, from which Parke and Vermillion counties were formed, lies to the south. The county's western border is shared with the state of Illinois. To the northwest lies Vermilion County, Illinois; its county seat, Danville, is west of the northern border of Vermillion County. To the southwest is Edgar County; its county seat, Paris, is west of Vermillion County's southern border. The state capital of Indianapolis lies about 65 miles (105 km) to the east.

According to the 2010 census, the county has a total area of 259.93 square miles (673.2 km^{2}), of which 256.88 square miles (665.3 km^{2}) (or 98.83%) is land and 3.05 square miles (7.9 km^{2}) (or 1.17%) is water. The Vermillion River, for which the county was named, enters from Illinois to the west and crosses the county to empty into the Wabash River near Cayuga. Forests cover about 23% of the county, or about 37,865 acres (15,323 ha), and consist principally of deciduous hardwoods among which maple–beech and oak–hickory forests are the most common.

At a meeting of the board of commissioners on March 23, 1824 (the same year the county was formed), four townships were created: Clinton, Helt, Highland, and Vermillion. Later, Eugene Township was created out of portions of Highland and Vermillion; the north end of Highland Township became part of Warren County.

There are seven incorporated towns in Vermillion County. Cayuga is located near the confluence of the Vermillion and Wabash rivers, along State Road 63 just west of its intersection with State Road 234. Clinton is the largest settlement in the county with a population of about 5100, and lies further to the south along the Wabash River, between it and State Road 63; State Road 163 passes through the town to reach U.S. Route 41 on the east side of the river. Fairview Park is just north of Clinton; State Road 63 passes through the north end of the town. Dana is a small town just north of the intersection of U.S. Route 36 and State Road 71. Newport is located just east of State Road 63, a few miles south of Cayuga; it is the county seat, although it is one of the smallest towns in the county. Perrysville is also located along the Wabash River, on State Road 32 just east of its intersection with State Road 63. Universal is in the far southern part of the county, west of State Road 63.

In addition to the towns, there are also many unincorporated communities. Helt Township has more than any other township and includes the communities of Alta, Bono, Highland, Hillsdale, Jonestown, Saint Bernice, and Summit Grove. Clinton Township contains Blanford, Centenary, Klondyke, and Syndicate. Highland Township includes Flat Iron, Gessie, Rileysburg, and Tree Spring. Eugene Township, which contains Cayuga, has just one unincorporated community: Eugene, which is just north of Cayuga.

At least three other communities once existed in Vermillion County but have since become extinct: Quaker, Randall, and Toronto.

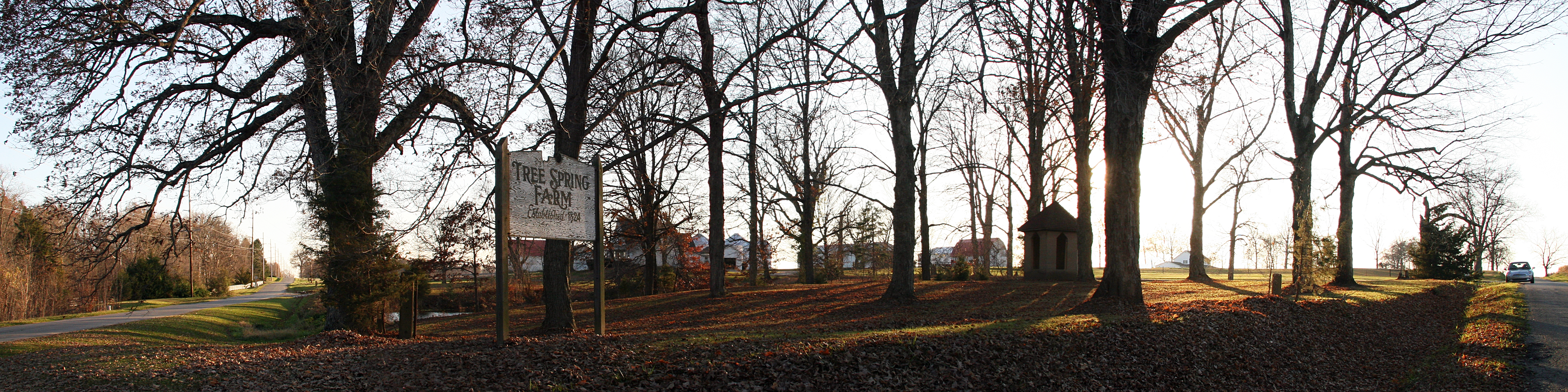
Tree Spring in northern Vermillion County

=== Climate ===
Newport

Climate chart (precipitation, max. and min. temperature)
J	F	M	A	M	J	J	A	S	O	N	D
1.9 32 15	1.8 38 20	2.8 49 29	3.4 62 39	4.3 73 50	4.5 82 60	4.2 85 63	3.7 83 60	3.1 77 52	2.8 65 41	3.2 50 33	2.5 37 21
- █ Average max. and min. temperatures in °F
- █ Precipitation totals in inches
- Source: The Weather Channel
Metric conversion
J	F	M	A	M	J	J	A	S	O	N	D
49 0 −9	46 3 −7	72 9 −2	86 17 4	108 23 10	115 28 16	106 29 17	93 28 16	77 25 11	71 18 5	81 10 1	65 3 −6
- █ Average max. and min. temperatures in °C
- █ Precipitation totals in mm

Vermillion County is in the humid continental climate region of the United States along with most of Indiana. Its Köppen climate classification is Dfa, meaning that it is cold, has no dry season, and has a hot summer. In recent years, temperatures in Newport have ranged from an average low of 15 °F (−9 °C) in January to a high of 85 °F (29 °C) in July, although a record low of −26 °F (−32 °C) was recorded in 1994, and a record high of 105 °F (41 °C) was recorded in 1988. Average monthly precipitation ranged from 1.80 inches (46 mm) inches in February to 4.53 inches (115 mm) inches in June.

== Transportation ==
Interstate 74 passes from east to west through the north end of the county; U.S. Route 136 does so as well, about 1.5 miles (2.4 km) further to the north. U.S. Route 36 crosses the south part of the county on its way from Rockville to Chrisman, Illinois, passing just south of Dana.

State Road 32 runs from the state line through Perrysville and continues east toward Crawfordsville. State Road 63 runs the length of the county from north to south on its way to Terre Haute in the south; State Road 71 begins at State Road 63 near Newport and runs southwest, then south through Dana and Bono before ending at Blanford. There, State Road 163 runs east through Clinton to join U.S. Route 41 on the east side of the Wabash River. State Road 234 runs from the Indiana border through Cayuga, continuing east through Kingman in Fountain County.

CSX Transportation operates a railroad line running from Danville, Illinois to Terre Haute. This line runs most of the length of Vermillion County from north to south, passing through Rilesyburg, Cayuga, and Clinton before crossing the Wabash River. Another CSX line coming from Decatur, Illinois, enters the county from the west and meets the north–south line near Hillsdale. The 6-mile (9.7 km) Vermilion Valley Railroad passes through the very north edge of the county on its way from the Flex-N-Gate factory west of Covington to Danville, Illinois.

=== Airport ===
The county has three small airports, the Clinton Airport, located in Clinton, Gessie Airport located in Gessie, and Universal Heli Port located in Universal. The Indianapolis International Airport is located about 65 miles (105 km) to the east.

== Economy ==
Vermillion County's economy is supported by a labor force of approximately 7,924 workers with an unemployment rate in December 2010 of 12.5%. Government jobs make up 13% of the county's employment. Manufacturing accounts for 12.4%, and construction 10%, while 8.5% of the county's jobs relate to farming.

=== Private employment by company ===
The largest private employers in Vermillion County as of 2017 are as follows. This list excludes franchises, retail, and majority part-time employers.

Largest Fulltime Employers of Vermillion County (as of 2017)
Rank	Employer	Number of Employees
1	White Construction	577
2	Elanco	460
3	South Vermillion School Corp	285
4	Union Hospital	160
5	International Paper	140
6	Duke Energy	120
7	North Vermillion School Corp	120
8	Scott Pet Products	54
9	National Gypsum	22
10	Scott Oil, Inc.	21
11	Hog Slat	18
12	Clinton Color Crafters	17
13	AC Grain	12

== Education and health care ==
The administration of public schools in Vermillion County is divided between two school districts, North Vermillion Community School Corporation and South Vermillion Community School Corporation, with each one taking different portions of the county. The North Vermillion district administers North Vermillion Junior-Senior High School and North Vermillion Elementary School, both located just north of Cayuga along State Road 63. The South Vermillion district administers schools located in Clinton, including South Vermillion High School, South Vermillion Middle School, and three elementary schools: Central, Ernie Pyle, and Van Duyn. It also manages the Parke Vermillion Education and Training Interlocal (PVETI) in Hillsdale.

There are no colleges or universities within Vermillion County, but there are several nearby. Indiana State University is a public four-year college in Terre Haute in neighboring Vigo County, about 30 miles (48 km) to the south of Newport. Rose–Hulman Institute of Technology, a smaller private college also in Terre Haute, specializes in teaching engineering, mathematics, and science. Ivy Tech Community College of Indiana has 23 campuses throughout the state; the nearest to Vermillion County is in Terre Haute.

The Vermillion County Public Library has branches in Cayuga, Newport, and Dana. In 1909 a Carnegie library was built in Clinton; it was expanded in 1947 and in 1953. In the early 1990s it was determined that an entirely new building was needed, and this was completed in 1994.

Union Hospital, located in Terre Haute to the south, operates a hospital in Clinton.

== Notable people ==
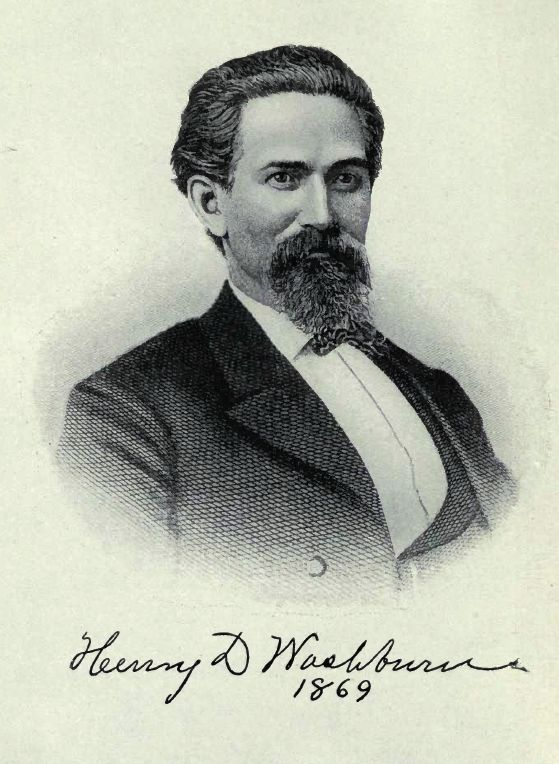
Henry Washburn

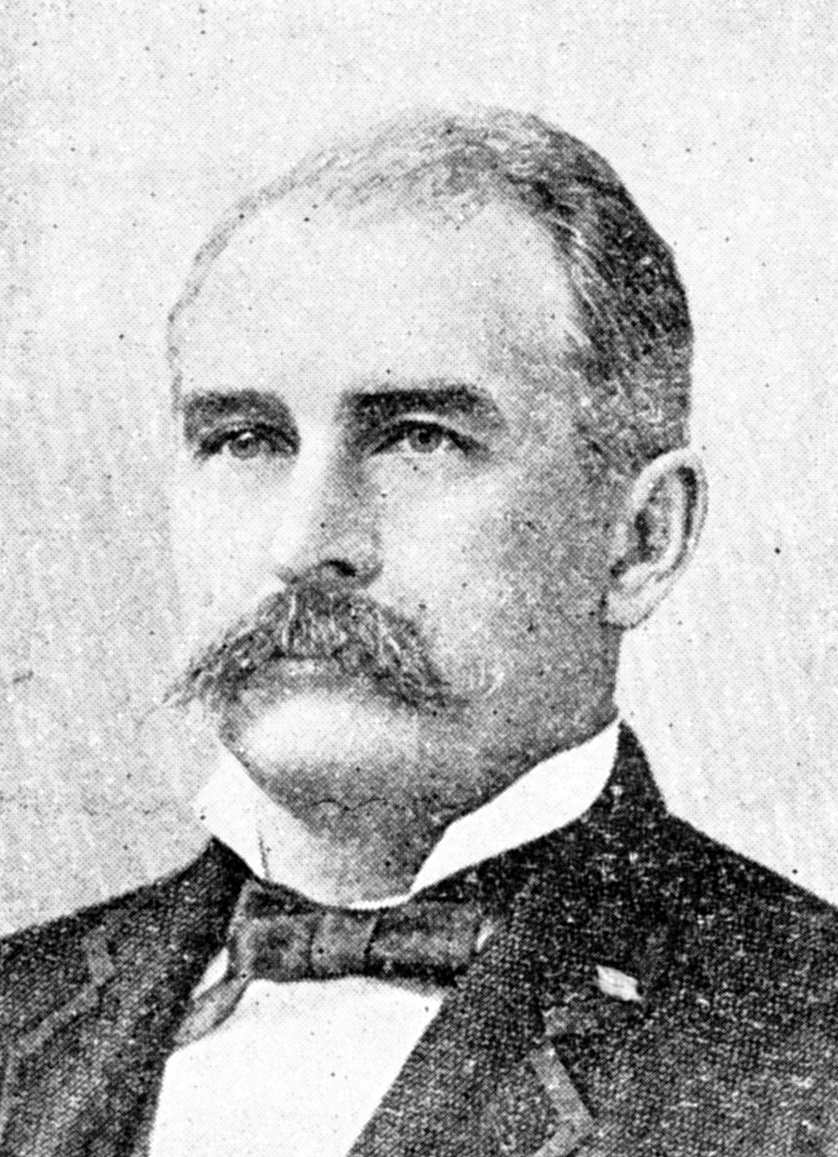
Claude Matthews

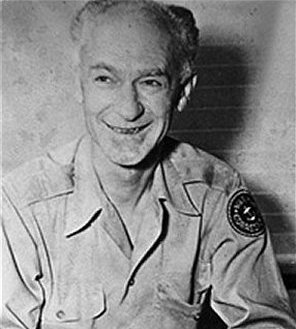
Ernie Pyle

Henry Dana Washburn was born in Vermont in 1832; in 1850 he moved to Vermillion County, studied law, and opened a practice in Newport in 1853. He served in the Civil War on the Union side as a lieutenant colonel and later as a general; after the war he was elected to the United States House of Representatives and served through 1869. In 1870 he headed an expedition which explored the area that later became Yellowstone National Park. He died 1871 in Clinton and is buried at Riverside Cemetery.

Claude Matthews was the governor of Indiana from 1893 to 1897. He was born in Kentucky in 1845; he moved to Vermillion County in 1867 and became a prominent farmer. He was elected Indiana Secretary of State in 1890, and governor in 1893. He died in 1898 in Indianapolis and is buried in Clinton; he was 52 years old.

Ernie Pyle was born on a farm near Dana in 1900. He served for three months in the United States Navy Reserve at the end of World War I; after the war he attended Indiana University but left before graduating to take a newspaper job. He served for several years as the managing editor at the Washington Daily News, and later became the nation's first aviation columnist. He began as a roving correspondent in 1935, and became a war correspondent when the United States entered World War II. His work during the war earned him a Pulitzer Prize. He died in combat in 1945.

Ken Kercheval was born in Clinton in 1935 and became an actor in 1962; he is best known for his role as "Cliff Barnes" in the television series Dallas.

Dana Lewman lived in Vermillion County until she was six. She is best known for the Breaking Good podcast. The five-part series chronicles her early life and teenage summers in various towns within the county, including Dana and Clinton.

== Government ==
The county government is a constitutional body, and is granted specific powers by the Constitution of Indiana, and by the Indiana Code.

County Council: The county council is the fiscal body of the county government and controls all the spending and revenue collection in the county. The 7 representatives are elected from 4 county districts and 3 at-large positions. The council members serve four-year terms. They are responsible for setting salaries, the annual budget, and special spending. The council also has limited authority to impose local taxes, in the form of an income and property tax that is subject to state level approval, excise taxes, and service taxes.

Board of Commissioners: The executive body of the county is made of a board of commissioners. The commissioners are elected county-wide, in staggered terms, and each serves a four-year term. One of the commissioners, typically the most senior, serves as president. The commissioners are charged with executing the acts legislated by the council, collecting revenue, and managing the day-to-day functions of the county government.

Court: The county maintains a small claims court that can handle some civil cases. The judge on the court is elected to a term of six years and must be a member of the Indiana Bar Association. The judge is assisted by a constable who is also elected to a four-year term. In some cases, court decisions can be appealed to the state level circuit court.

County Officials: The county has several other elected offices, including sheriff, coroner, auditor, treasurer, recorder, surveyor, and circuit court clerk Each of these elected officers serves a term of four years and oversees a different part of county government. Members elected to county government positions are required to declare party affiliations and to be residents of the county. Each of the townships has a trustee who administers rural fire protection and ambulance service, provides poor relief and manages cemetery care, among other duties. The trustee is assisted in these duties by a three-member township board. The trustees and board members are elected to four-year terms.

Based on 2000 census results, Vermillion County is part of Indiana's 8th congressional district, the 38th Indiana Senate district, and the 42nd Indiana House of Representatives district. The county traditionally leaned Democratic, but since Barack Obama won it (and Indiana) in the 2008 presidential election, the county has swung heavily to the Republican Party.

United States presidential election results for Vermillion County, Indiana
Year	Republican		Democratic		Third party(ies)	
Year	No.	%	No.	%	No.	%
1888	1,730	52.36%	1,438	43.52%	136	4.12%
1892	1,723	50.16%	1,437	41.83%	275	8.01%
1896	2,141	53.61%	1,814	45.42%	39	0.98%
1900	2,322	54.27%	1,799	42.04%	158	3.69%
1904	2,724	59.39%	1,437	31.33%	426	9.29%
1908	2,568	50.83%	1,844	36.50%	640	12.67%
1912	1,621	33.20%	1,780	36.46%	1,481	30.34%
1916	2,607	43.61%	2,343	39.19%	1,028	17.20%
1920	4,916	52.08%	3,218	34.09%	1,305	13.83%
1924	4,489	49.14%	2,779	30.42%	1,867	20.44%
1928	5,192	51.41%	4,793	47.46%	115	1.14%
1932	4,115	37.85%	6,390	58.77%	367	3.38%
1936	4,320	37.13%	7,188	61.78%	127	1.09%
1940	5,716	47.74%	6,174	51.57%	83	0.69%
1944	4,998	50.17%	4,912	49.30%	53	0.53%
1948	4,685	45.03%	5,426	52.15%	293	2.82%
1952	5,283	47.84%	5,708	51.69%	52	0.47%
1956	5,352	50.81%	5,149	48.88%	32	0.30%
1960	4,798	46.92%	5,391	52.71%	38	0.37%
1964	3,397	36.21%	5,957	63.49%	28	0.30%
1968	3,607	41.76%	3,845	44.52%	1,185	13.72%
1972	4,764	57.24%	3,515	42.23%	44	0.53%
1976	3,674	43.03%	4,791	56.11%	73	0.86%
1980	4,195	49.94%	3,793	45.15%	412	4.90%
1984	4,428	54.30%	3,666	44.96%	60	0.74%
1988	3,674	47.27%	4,044	52.03%	54	0.69%
1992	2,360	30.13%	3,652	46.63%	1,820	23.24%
1996	2,334	35.08%	3,251	48.87%	1,068	16.05%
2000	3,130	47.19%	3,370	50.81%	133	2.01%
2004	3,536	50.39%	3,424	48.80%	57	0.81%
2008	3,010	42.19%	4,003	56.10%	122	1.71%
2012	3,426	51.89%	2,979	45.12%	198	3.00%
2016	4,513	64.72%	2,081	29.84%	379	5.44%
2020	5,184	69.21%	2,145	28.64%	161	2.15%
2024	5,174	71.21%	1,928	26.53%	164	2.26%

== Communities ==
=== Townships ===
- Clinton
- Eugene
- Helt
- Highland
- Vermillion

=== Cities and Towns ===
- Cayuga
- Clinton
- Dana
- Fairview Park
- Newport
- Perrysville
- Universal

=== Census-designated places ===
- Blanford
- Saint Bernice

== Demographics ==
Historical population
Census	Pop.	Note	%±
1830	5,692		—
1840	8,274		45.4%
1850	8,661		4.7%
1860	9,422		8.8%
1870	10,840		15.0%
1880	12,025		10.9%
1890	13,154		9.4%
1900	15,252		15.9%
1910	18,865		23.7%
1920	27,625		46.4%
1930	23,238		−15.9%
1940	21,787		−6.2%
1950	19,723		−9.5%
1960	17,683		−10.3%
1970	16,793		−5.0%
1980	18,229		8.6%
1990	16,773		−8.0%
2000	16,788		0.1%
2010	16,212		−3.4%
2020	15,439		−4.8%
2025 (est.)	15,488	▲	0.3%
U.S. Decennial Census; 1790-1960 1900-1990; 1990-2000 2010

=== Racial and ethnic composition ===
Vermillion County, Indiana – Racial and ethnic composition Note: the US Census treats Hispanic/Latino as an ethnic category. This table excludes Latinos from the racial categories and assigns them to a separate category. Hispanics/Latinos may be of any race.
Race / Ethnicity (NH = Non-Hispanic)	Pop 1980	Pop 1990	Pop 2000	Pop 2010	Pop 2020	% 1980	% 1990	% 2000	% 2010	% 2020
White alone (NH)	18,087	16,639	16,454	15,862	14,692	99.22%	99.20%	98.01%	97.84%	95.16%
Black or African American alone (NH)	13	15	44	21	37	0.07%	0.09%	0.26%	0.13%	0.24%
Native American or Alaska Native alone (NH)	23	28	37	29	27	0.13%	0.17%	0.22%	0.18%	0.17%
Asian alone (NH)	32	26	20	31	46	0.18%	0.16%	0.12%	0.19%	0.30%
Native Hawaiian or Pacific Islander alone (NH)	x	x	3	5	11	x	x	0.02%	0.03%	0.07%
Other race alone (NH)	0	4	3	8	18	0.00%	0.02%	0.02%	0.05%	0.12%
Mixed race or Multiracial (NH)	x	x	120	126	440	x	x	0.71%	0.78%	2.85%
Hispanic or Latino (any race)	74	61	107	130	168	0.41%	0.36%	0.64%	0.80%	1.09%
Total	18,229	16,773	16,788	16,212	15,439	100.00%	100.00%	100.00%	100.00%	100.00%

=== 2020 census ===
As of the 2020 census, the county had a population of 15,439. The median age was 44.2 years. 21.3% of residents were under the age of 18 and 21.1% of residents were 65 years of age or older. For every 100 females there were 97.9 males, and for every 100 females age 18 and over there were 96.3 males age 18 and over.

The racial makeup of the county was 95.6% White, 0.2% Black or African American, 0.2% American Indian and Alaska Native, 0.3% Asian, 0.1% Native Hawaiian and Pacific Islander, 0.5% from some other race, and 3.2% from two or more races. Hispanic or Latino residents of any race comprised 1.1% of the population.

41.3% of residents lived in urban areas, while 58.7% lived in rural areas.

There were 6,504 households in the county, of which 28.0% had children under the age of 18 living in them. Of all households, 47.6% were married-couple households, 19.5% were households with a male householder and no spouse or partner present, and 24.9% were households with a female householder and no spouse or partner present. About 29.5% of all households were made up of individuals and 14.2% had someone living alone who was 65 years of age or older.

There were 7,297 housing units, of which 10.9% were vacant. Among occupied housing units, 75.2% were owner-occupied and 24.8% were renter-occupied. The homeowner vacancy rate was 1.5% and the rental vacancy rate was 6.7%.

=== 2010 census ===
As of the 2010 United States census, there were 16,212 people, 6,619 households, and 4,533 families residing in the county. The population density was 63.1 inhabitants per square mile (24.4/km^{2}). There were 7,488 housing units at an average density of 29.1 per square mile (11.2/km^{2}). The racial makeup of the county was 98.3% white, 0.2% Asian, 0.2% American Indian, 0.1% black or African American, 0.3% from other races, and 0.8% from two or more races. Those of Hispanic or Latino origin made up 0.8% of the population. In terms of ancestry, 24.7% were American, 19.5% were German, 11.0% were Irish, 9.8% were English, and 7.9% were Italian.

Of the 6,619 households, 30.6% had children under the age of 18 living with them, 52.7% were married couples living together, 11.0% had a female householder with no husband present, 31.5% were non-families, and 27.3% of all households were made up of individuals. The average household size was 2.42 and the average family size was 2.90. The median age was 41.9 years.

The median income for a household in the county was $47,697 and the median income for a family was $50,743. Males had a median income of $41,620 versus $30,168 for females. The per capita income for the county was $22,178. About 11.8% of families and 14.7% of the population were below the poverty line, including 21.9% of those under age 18 and 13.2% of those age 65 or over.

== List of Sheriffs ==
Parties

Democratic (41) Democratic-Republican (3) Independent (1)
Republican (4) Whig (3)

#	Sheriff	Took office	Left office	Party	Terms	Notes
1	William Fulton	1824	1824	Democratic-Republican		
2	Caleb Bales	1825	1828	Democratic-Republican		
3	Charles Trowbridge	1829	1832	Democratic-Republican		
4	William Craig	1833	1834	Independent		
5	Allen Stroud	1834	1838	Whig	2	
6	William Bales	1839	1842	Whig	1	
7	Charles Trowbridge	1843	1846	Whig	1	
8	Owen Craig	1847	1848	Democratic	1	
9	Eli Newlin	1849	1852	Democratic	1	
10	William Potts	1853	1856	Democratic	2	
11	James Weller	1857	1860	Democratic	1	
12	Isaac Porter	1861	1864	Democratic	1	
13	Harvey D. Crane	1865	1868	Republican	1	
14	Jacob S. Stephens	1869	1872	Republican	1	
15	Lewis H. Beckman	1873	1876	Republican	1	
16	Spencer H. Dallas	1877	1880	Democratic	1	
17	William C. Myers	1881	1884	Democratic	1	
18	John A. Darby	1885	1888	Democratic	1	
19	William Rheuby	1889	1890	Republican	1	
20	Michael Maher	1891	1892	Democratic	1	
21	Joseph C. Dillow	1893	1894	Democratic	1	
22	John M. Roberts	1895	1898	Democratic	1	
23	Frank Slater	1899	1900	Democratic	1	
24	James A. Swayne	1901	1904	Democratic	1	
25	Jacob S. Stephens	1905	1908	Democratic	1	
26	Morton Hollingsworth	1909	1910	Democratic	1	
27	Steve McCown	1911	1913	Democratic	1	Died in office
28	Roscoe Russell	1913	1914	Democratic	1	
29	Martin C. Jones	1914	1916	Republican	1	Killed in office
30	Harry E. Jones	1916	1916	Republican	1	
31	Morton Hollingsworth	1917	1920	Democratic	1	
32	Alex C. Jones	1920	1920	Democratic	1	
33	James W. Thomas	1920	1920	Democratic	1	
34	Lewis Sweet	1921	1922	Democratic	1	
35	Harry Newland	1922	1924	Democratic	1	
36	William Rein	1925	1928	Democratic	1	
37	Harry Newland	1929	1932	Democratic	1	
38	Earl Smith	1933	1936	Democratic	1	
39	Allen Hennis	1937	1940	Democratic	1	
40	Oel Potter	1941	1944	Democratic	1	
41	Loren Griffin	1945	1948	Democratic	1	
42	Dom Costello	1949	1958	Democratic	2	
43	Robert Lindsey	1959	1966	Democratic	2	
44	Frank Turchi	1967	1974	Democratic	2	
45	Jack Rauchbach	1975	1978	Democratic	2	
46	Frank Turchi	1979	1982	Democratic	2	
47	Kim H. Hawkins	1983	1990	Democratic	2	
48	Larry J. Jones	1991	1994	Democratic	2	
49	Paul F. Curry	1995	1998	Democratic	2	
50	Kim H. Hawkins	1999	2006	Democratic	2	
51	Robert J. Spence	2007	2014	Democratic	2	
52	Michael R. Phelps	2015	2022	Democratic	2	
53	Mike Holtkamp	2023	Present	Democratic	2	

== See also ==
- National Register of Historic Places listings in Vermillion County, Indiana
