= Highland (disambiguation) =

Highland is a broad term for areas of higher elevation, such as a mountain range or mountainous plateau.

Highland, Highlands, or The Highlands, may also refer to:

== Places ==
=== Africa ===
- Highlands, Johannesburg, South Africa
- Highlands, Harare, Zimbabwe
- Eastern Highlands, Zimbabwe
- Ethiopian Highlands, a mass of mountains
- Northern Highlands, Madagascar
- Western High Plateau, or Western Highlands, or Cameroon Highlands

=== The Americas ===
==== Antigua and Barbuda ====
- Barbuda Highlands, a plateau

==== Brazil ====
- Brazilian Highlands, a geographical region

==== Canada ====
- Highlands, British Columbia, a municipality
- Highlands, Edmonton, a residential neighbourhood
- Highlands, Newfoundland and Labrador, a settlement

==== United States ====
- Highland, Arkansas
- Highland, California
- Highland, California, a former name of Highland Springs, Lake County, California
- Highland, Denver, Colorado
- Highland City, Florida
- Highlands County, Florida
- Highland, Illinois
- Highland, Lake County, Indiana
- Highland, Indiana (disambiguation), the name of several places
- Highland, Iowa
- Highland, Kansas
- Highlands, Lexington, Kentucky
- The Highlands, Louisville, Kentucky
- Highland, Maryland
- Highlands, Holyoke, Massachusetts
- Highland, Minnesota (disambiguation), the name of several places
- Highland, Missouri
- Highlands, New Jersey
  - Highlands Air Force Station
- New York–New Jersey Highlands, a geological formation
- Highland, Sullivan County, New York
- Highland, Ulster County, New York
- Highlands, New York
- Highlands, North Carolina
- Highland, Ohio
- Highland County, Ohio
- Highlands, Texas
- Highland, Utah
- Highland, Virginia
- Highland County, Virginia
- Highland, Washington
- The Highlands (Seattle), Washington, a gated community
- Highland, West Virginia (disambiguation), the name of several places
- Highland, Wisconsin (disambiguation), the name of several places

=== Asia ===
- Central Highlands (India)
- Thai highlands

=== Europe ===
- Dukagjin Highlands, Albania
- Armenian highlands, a geographical region
- Highlands of Iceland, a geographical area
- Scottish Highlands, a historic region of Scotland
  - Highland (council area)
- Highland (ward), in Perth and Kinross, Scotland

=== Oceania ===
==== Australia ====
- Southern Highlands (New South Wales), usually referred as the Southern Tablelands in New South Wales
- Central Highlands (region), Victoria
- Highlands, Victoria, rural town in Victoria, in the Shire of Mitchell
- Central Highlands (Tasmania)
  - Tasmanian Central Highlands, a bioregion
  - Central Highlands Council

==== Papua New Guinea ====
- Highlands Region

== Arts and entertainment ==
- Highland (album), by One More Time, 1992
  - "Highland" (song)
- Highlands (album), by White Heart, 1993
- "Highlands" (song), by Bob Dylan, 1997
- Highland (band), a German dance/hip hop group
- Highland (Irish), an Irish musical form
- Highland, the fictional town that is the setting of Beavis and Butt-Head
- Highlands (TV series), a 2008 Scottish TV series

== Buildings ==
- Highland (St. Francisville, Louisiana), listed on the NRHP in Louisiana
- Highland (James Monroe house), Virginia, U.S.
- The Highland, a historic building in Massachusetts, U.S.
- Highlands (Smithfield, Kentucky), listed on the NRHP in Kentucky
- Highlands, Wahroonga, Australia
- The Highlands (Whitemarsh, Pennsylvania), U.S., a historic building
- The Highlands (Wheeling, West Virginia), U.S., a retail complex
- Thomas I. Stoner House, or The Highlands, a historic house in Des Moines, Iowa, U.S.
- Highland Theatre, a historic theater in Los Angeles, California, U.S.

== Education ==
- Highland Community College (disambiguation)
- Highland High School (disambiguation)
- Highland Middle School (disambiguation)
- Highland School (disambiguation)
- Highlands Christian College, Toowoomba, Queensland, Australia
- Highlands Elementary School (disambiguation)
- The Highland School, in Ellenboro, West Virginia
- The Highlands School, in Irving, Texas
- The Highlands School, Reading, England

== Other uses ==
- Highland (automobile), an 1890s Australian car
- Highland (surname), including a list of people with the name
- Highland cattle, a breed of cattle
- Highland pony, a breed of horse
- Highland Radio, an Irish radio station
- Highland Records, a record label
- Highland Superstores, a defunct American consumer electronics and home appliance chain
- SS Highland, a cargo ship 1963–69
- Highlands Coffee, a Vietnamese coffee shop chain
- Highlands Hospital, a former hospital in north London

== See also ==
- Highland Avenue (disambiguation)
- Highland Beach (disambiguation)
- Highland County (disambiguation)
- Highland Heights (disambiguation)
- Highland Lake (disambiguation)
- Highland Mills, New York
- Highland Park (disambiguation)
- Highland Peak (disambiguation)
- Highland Plantation, Maine
- Highland Springs (disambiguation)
- Highland station (disambiguation)
- Highlands station
- Highland Township (disambiguation)
- Highland Village (disambiguation)
- Highlander (disambiguation)
