= Hyland =

Hyland may refer to:

- Hyland Goodrich, child actor on the Hallmark TV series When Calls the Heart, portraying ‘Little Jack Thornton’
- Hyland (band), an American Christian rock band
- Hyland Airport, in Yukon, Canada
- Hyland Bay and Moyle Floodplain, Northern Territory of Australia
- Hyland Software, an enterprise content management software provider

== People with the surname ==
- Angus Hyland (born 1963), British designer and art director
- Bernard Hyland (born 1937), Australian botanist
- Bones Hyland (born 2000), American basketball player
- Brian Hyland (born 1943), American musician
- Davy Hyland (born 1955), Northern Irish politician
- Diana Hyland (1936–1977), American actress
- Drew Hyland (born 1939), American academic and philosopher
- Frances Hyland (1927–2004), Canadian actress
- Grace Hyland, Australian social media influencer
- Greg Hyland, author of the comic strip Lethargic Lad
- Hank Nelson (Hank) (1937–2012), Australian historian of the Pacific
- Harry Hyland (1889–1969), Canadian ice hockey player
- Herbert Hyland (1884–1970), Australian politician
- Jeffrey Hyland, American businessman
- Ken Hyland (born 1951), British applied linguist
- Khaleem Hyland (born 1989), Trinidad and Tobago footballer
- Lawrence A. Hyland (1897–1989), American radar engineer and executive of Hughes Aircraft
- Lennart Hyland (1919–1993), Swedish journalist and radio and television icon
- M. J. Hyland (born 1968), Australian novelist
- Martin Hyland, British mathematician
- Pat Hyland (disambiguation)
- Robert Hyland (1920–1992), American radio station owner
- Sabine Hyland (born 1964), American anthropologist
- Sarah Hyland (born 1990), American actress
- Thomas Hyland, blackjack player
- Tom Hyland (1952–2024), Irish human rights activist for East Timor
- William Hyland (disambiguation)

== See also ==
- Hyland's, a brand of homeopathic products
- Hyland Hotel (disambiguation)
- Highland (disambiguation)
- Hylan (disambiguation)
