= Highlands School =

Highlands School may refer to:

- Highlands School, Grange Park, Middlesex, UK
- The Highlands School, Reading, England
- Highlands Primary School, Redbridge, England
- Highlands School (North Carolina), Highlands, North Carolina, US
- The Highlands School, Irving, Texas, US

== See also ==
- Highland Hills Middle School, Georgetown, Indiana, US
- Highlands Elementary School (disambiguation)
- Highland High School (disambiguation)
- Highland Secondary School (disambiguation)
