= Highland Springs =

Highland Springs may refer to:

== Communities ==
- Highland Springs, Lake County, California
- Highland Springs, Riverside County, California
- Highland Springs, a neighborhood of Kokomo, Indiana
- Highland Springs, Kentucky
- Highland Springs, Virginia
- Kidapawan, nicknamed Highland Springs, in the province of Cotabato, Philippines

== Other uses ==
- Highland Springs (race horse), the 1990 winner of the Appleton Stakes
- Highland Springs Elementary School, in Beaumont, California
- Highland Springs High School in Henrico County, Virginia
- Highland Springs Reservoir, a reservoir near Kelseyville, California
- Highland Springs Surgical Center in Beaumont, California, a Seventh-day Adventist health facility

== See also ==
- Highland (disambiguation)
- Highland Spring, a Scottish supplier of bottled water
