= Highland Township, Nebraska =

Highland Township, Nebraska may refer to the following places in Nebraska:

- Highland Township, Adams County, Nebraska
- Highland Township, Gage County, Nebraska

== See also ==
- Highland Township (disambiguation)
