= Highland station =

Highland station or Highlands station may refer to:

- Highland station (Capital MetroRail), a commuter rail station in Austin, Texas, USA
- Highland station (MBTA), a commuter rail station in Boston, Massachusetts, USA
- Highland station (New York), a former rapid transit station in Rochester, New York, USA
- Highland station (PAAC), a light rail station in Bethel Park, Pennsylvania, USA
- Highland station (SEPTA), a commuter rail station in Philadelphia, Pennsylvania, USA
- Highland Avenue station (SEPTA), a commuter rail station in Philadelphia, Pennsylvania, USA
- Highland Village/Lewisville Lake station, a commuter rail station in Highland Village, Texas, USA
- Highlands station, a commuter rail station in Hinsdale, Illinois, USA
- Fujikyu-Highland Station, a railway station in Fujikawaguchiko, Yamanashi, Japan
- Hollywood/Highland station, a subway station in Los Angeles County, California, USA
- Highland Station, predecessor to Sparks, Kansas

== See also ==
- Highland (disambiguation)
- Highland Park station (disambiguation)
