= List of Hatzalah chapters =

This is a list of Hatzalah chapters. Hatzalah is an all-volunteer emergency medical services organization staffed by Jewish Orthodox emergency medical technicians and paramedics. Locations where chapters are situated are listed alphabetically by geography.

Each neighborhood or city in Hatzalah operates independently. There are some exceptions, where there is a tight affiliation with neighboring Hatzalahs, a loose affiliation of neighboring Hatzalahs, or some other basic level of co-operation.

== Argentina ==
- Buenos Aires (covering Once, Flores, Palermo, Barracas, Belgrano)

== Australia ==
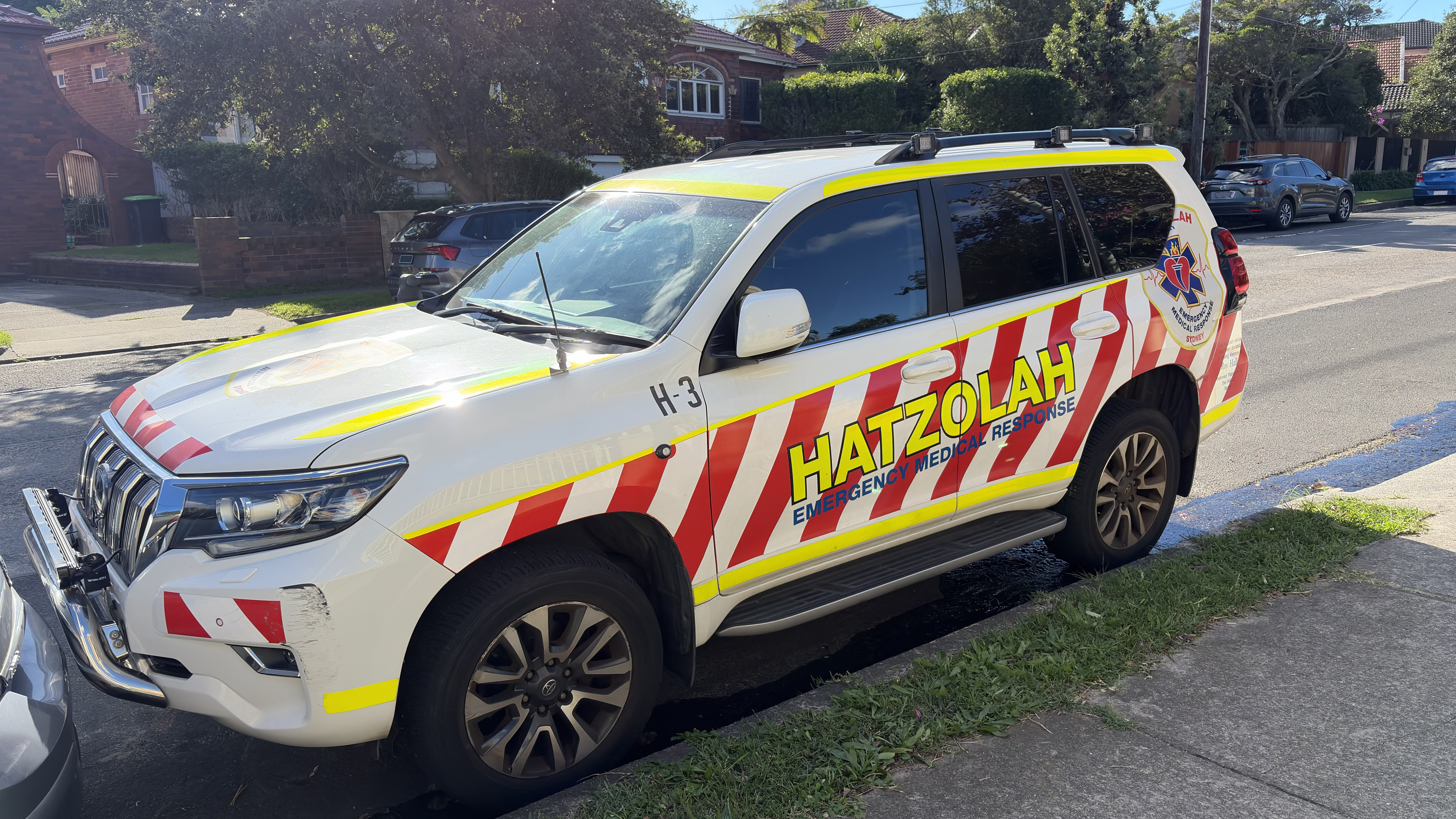
A Hatzolah vehicle in Vaucluse, Sydney

- Melbourne
- Sydney

== Austria ==
- Vienna

== Belgium ==
- Antwerp

== Brazil ==
- São Paulo (covering Jardim Paulista, Higienópolis, Bom Retiro)

== Canada ==
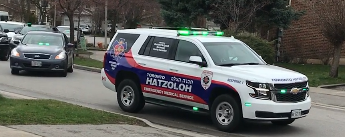
A marked and an unmarked unit responding in Toronto

- Montreal, Quebec
- Kiryas Tosh, Boisbriand, Quebec
- Toronto, Ontario

== Chile ==
- Santiago (covering, Providencia, Las Condes, Vitacura, Lo Barnechea)

== Israel ==
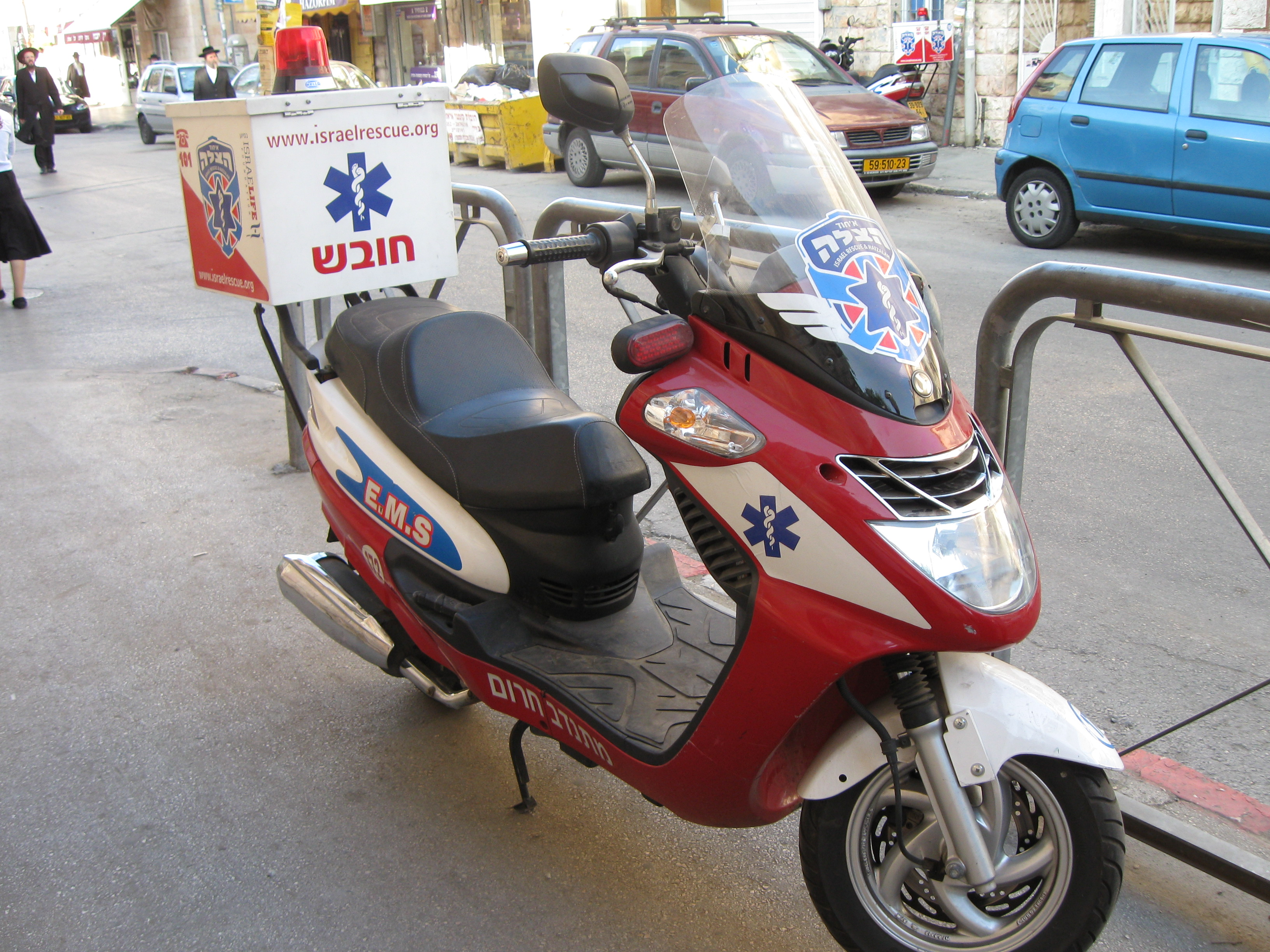
An Ichud Hatzalah rapid response scooter parked in Geula, Jerusalem

Hatzalah in Israel, on the national level, exists as two different organizations: Tzevet Hatzolah, and Ichud Hatzalah (rendered in English as United Hatzalah). Hatzolah Israel was the original organization, under the leadership of David "Duki" Greenwald. In 2006, Ichud Hatzalah was launched as competing organization with Hatzolah Israel, which eventually led Hatzolah Israel to declare bankruptcy. Many Hatzolah Israel volunteers who were dissatisfied with the actions of Ichud Hatzalah's leadership objected to joining the organization, and launched their own organization called Tzevet Hatzolah (loosely translated to TEAM Hatzolah).

While Tzevet Hatzolah volunteers provide both emergency first responder care and emergency transport utilizing Magen David Adom ambulances, Ichud Hatzalah primarily provides first responder care and largely relies on Magen David Adom for emergency transport. Each of the organizations has many local chapters, and provides coordinated response for larger emergencies or extra coverage across multiple localities.

Additionally, there are several smaller Hatzolah organizations that operate on the local level. A partial list can be found below.

- Beit Shemesh (unaffiliated; only service to provide both first response and ambulance transportation)
- Har Nof (affiliated with MDA, named HaChovesh, instead of Hatzolah)
- Gush Dan (out of Bnei Brak, greater Tel Aviv area, including: Ra'anana, Herzliya, Netanya; unaffiliated)

== Mexico ==
Chevra Hatzalah Mexico was founded in 1997 by Mr. Chaim Silver. The branch is run by the Syrian-Sephardic community under supervision of Mr. Abraham Levy who is the CEO. It has 70 full-time volunteers, seven ambulances and six locations (five bases and a headquarters). It also has access to a helicopter and air transport. All dispatchers are Volunteer EMS for immediate intervention and instructions, some of them certified in Advanced Critical Care Medicine and Emergency response, actually working for prestigious Mexican Hospitals and National Medical Centers. Volunteers have plenty of experience in Trauma and Internal Medicine emergencies, having training in the Mexican Red Cross's Ambulance Center. The branch covers the Jewish areas of Tecamachalco, Bosques, Polanco, Interlomas, and the weekend resort city Cuernavaca. It has full-time operating bases in three major Jewish areas, having its Central Base in Tecamachalco, a dense populated Jewish area in Mexico City.

== Russia ==
- Moscow

== South Africa ==
- Johannesburg

== Switzerland ==
- Zurich

== United Kingdom ==
- Canvey Island
- Edgware
- Gateshead
- Hertfordshire
- Manchester
- North London
- North West London

== Ukraine ==
- Kyiv

== United States ==
=== California ===
Los Angeles has a chapter whose units use the "LA" radio prefix, which provides Basic life support level care, and relies on the Los Angeles Fire Department for Advanced life support paramedic care and transport. On August 31, 2009, they began direct transport of patients to area hospitals using their own ambulance.

- Los Angeles Covering Hancock Park / Fairfax, Pico-Robertson / Beverly wood / Beverly Hills, and Valley Village / North Hollywood / Tarzana / Encino.

=== Connecticut ===
The Orthodox community in Waterbury, Connecticut, centered around the yeshiva there, has its own Hatzalah.

In 2016 the Mesivta of Yeshiva of Waterbury moved to Durham, Connecticut. As Durham is 35 minutes away from the Jewish community in Waterbury, the Hatzolah of Durham was established which takes care of the Mesivta of Waterbury Yeshiva campus located in Durham, under the leadership and guidance of Rabbi Daniel Kalish.

=== Florida ===
In January 2010, Hatzalah of Miami-Dade began with providing basic life support response in Miami-Dade County and relying on Miami-Dade Fire Rescue and Miami Beach Fire Department for advanced life support care and transport. Coverage was eventually expanded to include communities in some areas of unincorporated North East Miami-Dade County and North Miami Beach, Aventura, Highland Lakes, Surfside, Bal Harbour, Bay Harbor Islands, Miami Beach, Hollywood, Florida, Hallandale Beach and Lauderhill.

On April 26, 2021, the Florida Senate unanimously passed bill CS/HB 1084, which allows certain faith-based first responder agencies to obtain licensure as an ambulance transport provider. On June 14, 2021, Governor Ron DeSantis signed it into law.

Now known as Hatzalah South Florida Emergency Medical Services, the non-profit volunteer organization is a fully licensed advanced life support service provider, and provides emergency basic life support and advanced life support response and transport in Miami-Dade, Broward and Palm Beach counties, serving communities in some areas of unincorporated North East Miami-Dade County and North Miami Beach, Aventura, Highland Lakes, Surfside, Bal Harbour, Bay Harbor Islands, Miami Beach, Hollywood, Hallandale Beach, Lauderhill, Deerfield Beach and Boca Raton.

=== Illinois ===
In 2011, Hatzalah Chicago started providing non-transport Basic Life Support ("BLS") coverage for Lincolnwood, Peterson Park, Skokie, and West Rogers Park. Hatzalah Chicago started BLS transport in 2013 and Advanced Life Support ("ALS") service in 2018. They currently operate four ALS ambulances and have responded to over 10,000 calls for service.

=== Maryland ===
Baltimore started a Hatzalah in 2007 as a first-responder-only service, with transport to be done by Baltimore City ambulance units. Currently, Hatzalah of Baltimore does maintain a fleet of six ambulances, and provides Advanced Life Support (ALS) services to the Northwest Baltimore community, provided it is in their response area.

=== Michigan ===
Hatzalah of Michigan was formed in 2017 to augment existing emergency medical services in the cities of Oak Park, Southfield, and Huntington Woods. Hatzalah of Michigan is state licensed and regulated by the Oakland County Medical Control Authority (OCMCA). The OCMCA oversees all EMS personnel in the county. Hatzalah personnel are licensed EMS providers, who are further advised by a panel of doctors and have trained with fire and ambulance personnel to ensure continuity of care.

=== New Jersey ===
New Jersey has many Hatzalah divisions throughout the State, each of which maintains their own emergency phone number, dispatchers, and radio frequencies. Although not officially connected, many engage in shared training, purchasing, and stand-by event coverage.

Per New Jersey law, volunteers with municipality-issued permits may equip their cars with blue lights and electronic airhorns. Coordinators/Chiefs ("Officers") personal vehicles, are permitted the use of red lights and sirens; not all divisions make use of these allowances.

Paramedic (ALS) units in New Jersey are hospital system-based, per NJ State law. Hatzalah of Central Jersey, Hatzalah of Metrowest, and Bergen Hatzalah, operate ALS trucks in partnership with Robert Wood Johnson Mobile Health Services. Hatzalah of Passaic/Clifton partners with St. Clare's.

BERGEN COUNTY

==== Bergen Hatzalah ====
Bergen Hatzalah Emergency Medical Services is a division of Central Hatzalah of New York City. Established on September 3, 2021, it is the first Chevra Hatzalah of NYC division in New Jersey and the New York-based organization's first new neighborhood division to join in over 30 years.

With more than 60 responders, Bergen Hatzalah uses the "BC" unit number prefix while serving 40 municipalities across Bergen County. The organization is licensed by the NJOEMS and operates 5 ambulances strategically positioned in Bergenfield, Englewood, Fairlawn, and Teaneck. In addition, 8 fully-equipped, agency-owned Emergency Response Vehicles (ERVs) ensure rapid response times, complemented by volunteers responding in their personal vehicles who carry comprehensive sets of equipment, including Automated External Defibrillators (AEDs), lifesaving medications, and a full range of first-aid supplies.

==== Hatzalah of Metrowest ====
Hatzalah of Metrowest (HMW), formerly Hatzalah of West Orange and Livingston, launched on September 3, 2021, with "X-prefix" unit numbers. On September 24, 2022, Hatzalah announced its name change in parallel with the creation of its Morristown division. Areas of operation include West Orange, Livingston, Morristown, and more than a dozen surrounding towns in Essex and Morris counties.

Hatzalah of Metrowest is an active 911 mutual aid provider, and has 55 EMTs, 4 Ambulances, and 2 Emergency Response Vehicles (ERVs). HMW is licensed by the NJOEMS.

In July 2025, HMW launched an Advanced Life Support (ALS) unit, in partnership with Robert Wood Johnson Mobile Health Services. It is the first program of its kind in Essex County and among the first in the State of New Jersey.

Hatzalah of Essex County

Formerly Hatzalah of Newark, EMS, with the "N-prefix" unit numbers went live in 2015, and provides BLS service to the Newark community and surrounding areas. ALS services, when needed, are dispatched by the local hospital. In September 2019, it rebranded itself as Hatzalah of Essex County. HEC is primarily operational during business hours.

HUDSON COUNTY

==== Hatzalah of Hudson County (Union City-Jersey City) ====
Formerly Hatzolah of Union City, HC is run out of Mosded Sanz-Zviel, which is the center of the Chasidic community in Union City. Union City is located in Hudson County and is not related to Union County (sometimes referred to as Hatzalah of Elizabeth) or Union City.

MIDDLESEX COUNTY

==== Hatzolah of Middlesex County ====
Hatzolah of Middlesex County, with "MC-prefix" unit numbers. Middlesex County is a county located in North-Central New Jersey. It launched on November 16, 2014. At this time, the primary areas of response are Edison (including Raritan Center), Highland Park, Piscataway, and portions of East Brunswick. For events in hotels, they have responded to Somerset as well.

MONMOUTH COUNTY

==== Jersey Shore Hatzalah ====
This chapter covers the areas of Deal, West Deal, Long Branch, Oakhurst, Eatontown, Loch Arbour, West Allenhurst, Allenhurst, Ocean Township, and additional Jersey Shore communities during warmer months. This is the only Sephardic-run Hatzalah in the United States. (Mexico City, Mexico, also has its own Sephardic Hatzalah.)

MORRIS COUNTY

See Hatzalah of Metrowest, which covers Morristown, Morris Township and the surrounding areas.

OCEAN COUNTY

==== Central Jersey ====
Formerly Hatzolah of Lakewood; this is the largest division in New Jersey, with "CJ-prefix" unit numbers. Central Jersey has a Paramedic (ALS) unit. The ALS unit is owned and run by RWJ Barnabas (and formerly by MONOC), but the Paramedics are also Central Jersey Hatzolah members, and the vehicles were donated by Hatzolah Central Jersey to the hospital system. This unusual arrangement meets New Jersey's strict hospital-based ALS rules, while giving Hatzolah its own ALS coverage. Unique to the division, Central Jersey has its own Rescue (extrication) unit.

PASSAIC COUNTY

==== Passaic / Clifton ====
Hatzolah of Passaic/Clifton EMS serves the Orthodox Jewish communities in Passaic and Clifton, New Jersey, as well as nearby areas with contiguous populations. The majority of the community and its institutions are located in Passaic. The chapter responds to over 1,200 emergency calls annually and serves a population of more than 15,000 residents.

Due to its geographic proximity, Hatzolah of Passaic/Clifton also provides primary coverage for the American Dream Mall. Units from this chapter are designated with a "P" prefix and operate across both cities, although operations are primarily based in Passaic, with some personnel and management located in Clifton. The chapter is also positioned to provide mutual aid to the city of Passaic.

As of 2024, Hatzolah of Passaic/Clifton comprises approximately 30 active members, 20 dispatchers, four ambulances, and four service units, serving around 2,000 households. In summer 2022, the organization opened its first ambulance garage centrally located within the community. In November 2024, it launched an advanced life support (ALS) unit in collaboration with St. Clare’s Health.

UNION COUNTY

==== Hatzolah of Linden ====
Hatzolah of Linden with "LR-prefix" unit numbers. Linden uses AT&T First Net, which is a cell phone based radio system. Hatzolah of Linden branched off from Hatzolah of Union County on August 25, 2021. Hatzolah of Linden has five ambulances, and another on the way, serving over 350 households living in the city of Linden and neighboring cities.

==== Hatzalah of Union County ====
Hatzalah of Union County, with "U-prefix" unit numbers. Union County is geographically and organizationally separate from Union City. With three active ambulances, Union County units cover all of Union County, including Hillside, Elizabeth, Roselle Park, and Union Township, an up-and-coming orthodox Jewish neighborhood. Union County units may also respond to businesses and residences in parts of the city of Newark that border Union County, where slow EMS response may allow the Hatzalah ambulance to arrive from Elizabeth or Hillside before any Newark city crews arrive. Hatzalah of Union County also covers Elizabeth's Jersey Gardens Mall, Newark Liberty International Airport, as well as nearby stretches of the New Jersey Turnpike and Garden State Parkway. Their three ambulances are located in Elizabeth, Hillside, and the Township of Union.

=== New York ===
==== Canarsie / Mill Basin ====
The Canarsie / Mill Basin chapter was originally just the Canarsie division. As the Canarsie Orthodox neighborhood declined, and the Mill Basin one grew, Canarsie started taking more calls and members from nearby Mill Basin, and is now primarily a Mill Basin operation. Canarsie / Mill Basin also covers nearby Georgetown. There are parts of the Brooklyn neighborhood of Mill Basin that border Madison / Midwood / East Midwood; so, there is some overlap in coverage with Flatbush.

==== Catskill Mountains ====
This chapter is part of Central Hatzalah of New York City. While the Catskills have a year-round operation, the vast majority of their activity is in July and August, when summer residents arrive.

==== Fleischmanns ====
Flichmanns Hatzolah operates in the summer months only, using one ambulance designated as FL-901.

==== Kiryas Joel/Monroe ====
The Hasidic community in Kiryas Joel (Monroe), NY, has a chapter. Uniquely, it operates separately from all other New York State Hatzolah organizations. It was founded in 1995.

==== Monroe, NY ====
Monsey, New York

==== New Square ====
This chapter is a break-off from the Rockland Hatzoloh chapter. Uniquely, the chapter has female Certified First Responders who respond to calls involving obstetrics-related emergencies.

==== New York City Central Hatzalah ====
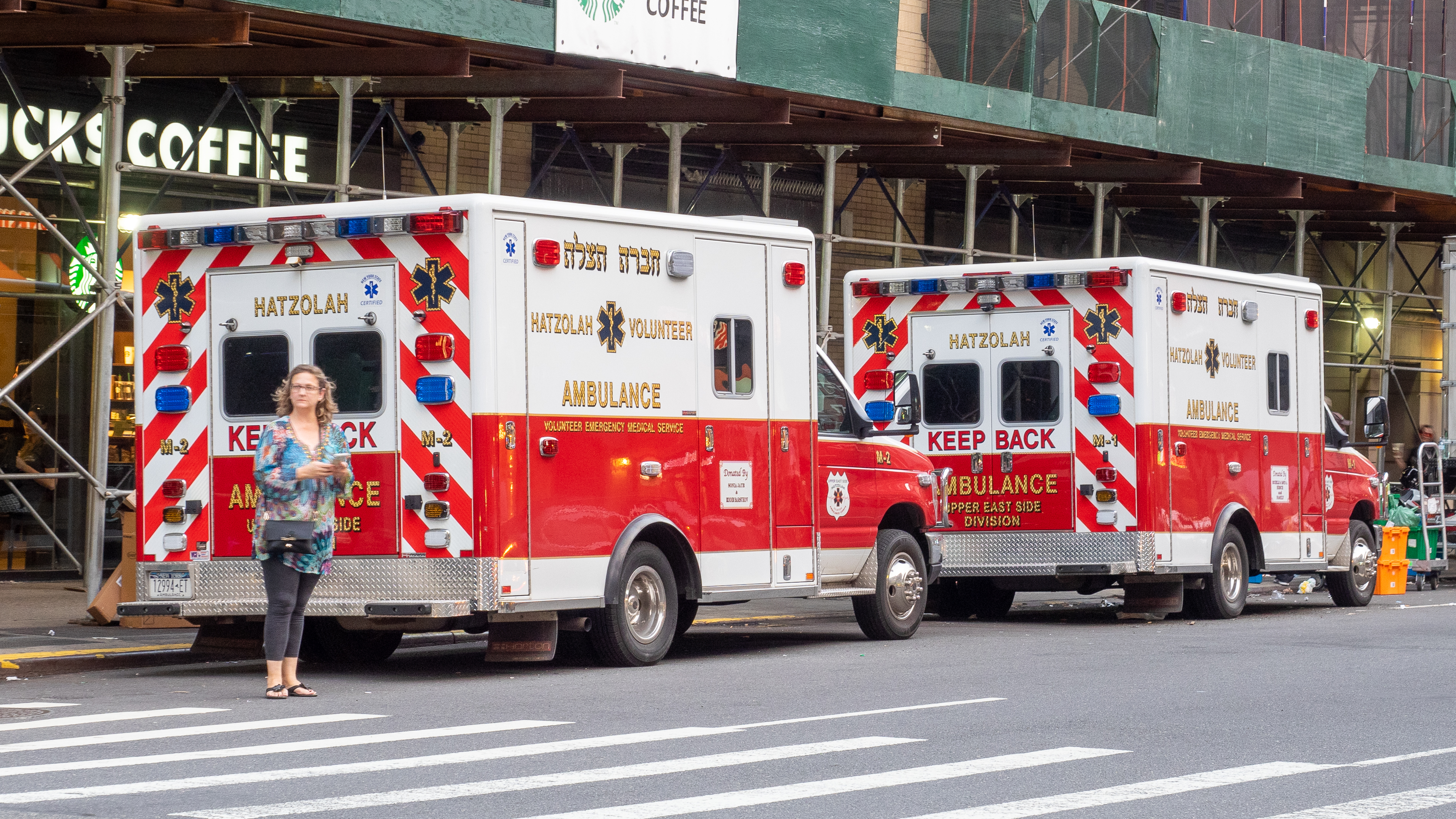
Upper East Side division ambulances

This chapter has seventeen local divisions which share rabbinic counsel, radio frequencies, central dispatch, and lobbying, but have separate fund-raising and management. Catskills, the Five Towns, and Yonkers are the only areas outside of New York City covered by NYC chapters. The chapter has a central dispatching network, with teams of two volunteer dispatchers working in tandem. Each dispatch team works several hours on a shift. The chapter also uses a mobile command center for dealing with large events.

- Bergen Hatzalah — Though headquartered and responding within the Bergen County, NJ, community, Bergen Hatzalah is part of the Central Hatzalah operations
- Borough Park This chapter covers Kensington, Bensonhurst, Sunset Park, and sometimes Ditmas Park.
- Canarsie. This chapter covers Canarsie, Flatlands, Georgetown, and Mill Basin, and is based in Mill Basin

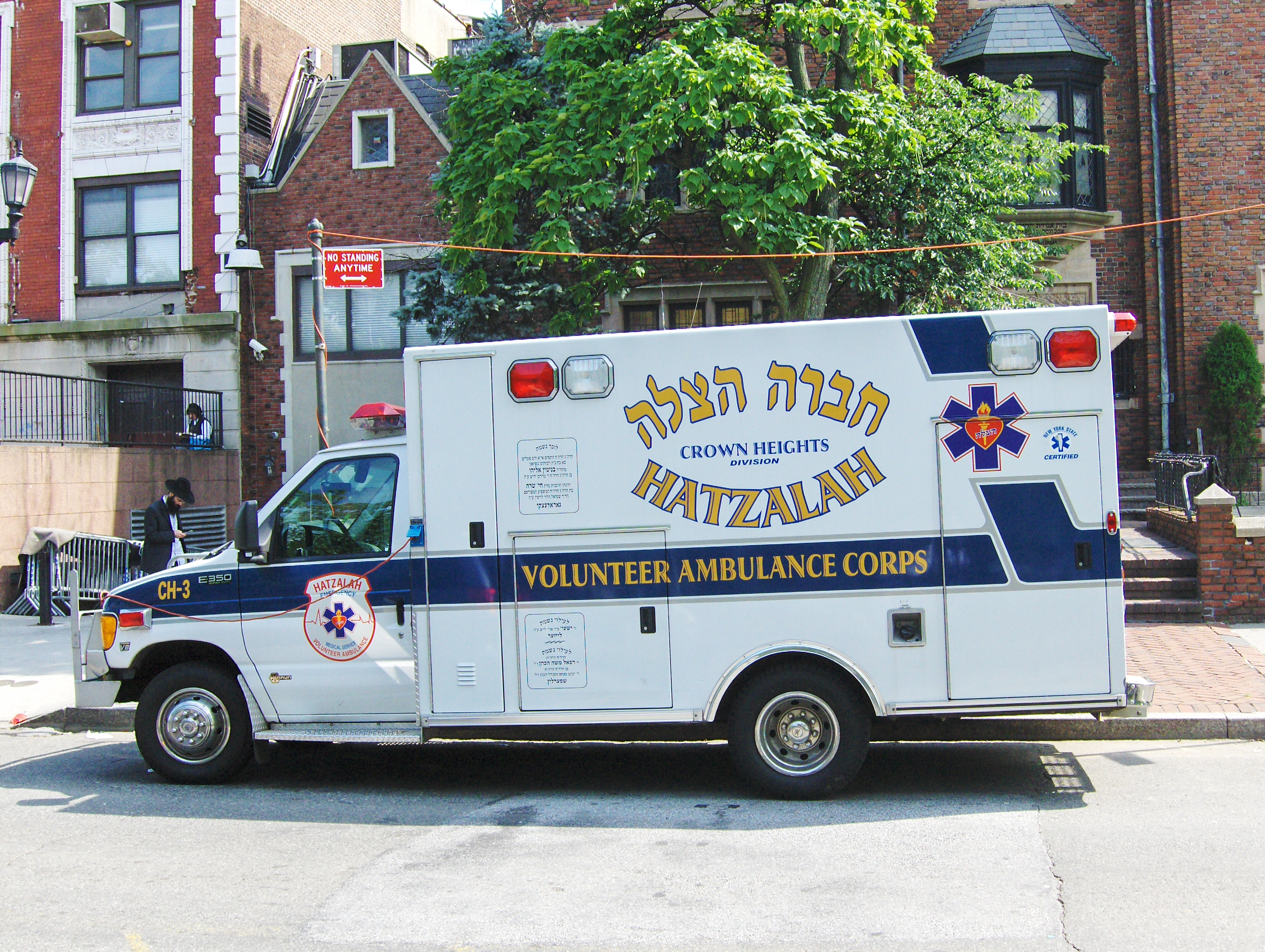
A Crown Heights division ambulance

- Crown Heights This chapter covers the Crown Heights and East Flatbush neighborhoods as well as Prospect Park.
- Flatbush. This chapter covers the Brooklyn neighborhoods of Midwood, East Midwood, Madison, and Gravesend. The extended area includes Brighton Beach, Manhattan Beach, Ditmas Park, and Kensington, and, occasionally, Bensonhurst.
- Lower East Side Manhattan (below 34th Street)
- Midtown Manhattan
- Queens, including Great Neck and JFK Airport
- Richmond, Staten Island. This chapter covers the neighborhood of Willowbrook.
- Riverdale. This chapter covers Riverdale, parts of Yonkers, in Westchester County, and extended regions of the Bronx.
- Rockaway / Lawrence. This chapter covers the Rockaways and Lawrence, Arverne, Atlantic Beach, Bayswater, Belle Harbor, Cedarhurst, East Rockaway, Far Rockaway, Hewlett, Inwood, Kennedy Airport, Lawrence, Long Beach, North Woodmere, Rosedale, and Woodmere.
- Sea Gate
- Staten Island
- Upper East Side Manhattan (34th street to 125th street Central Park / 5th Ave to East River)
- Upper West Side Manhattan,
- Washington Heights
- Williamsburg (founding chapter)

==== Rockland County ====
Hatzoloh is the largest non-profit ambulance service in Rockland County.

=== Ohio ===
Hatzalah Cleveland

Hatzalah Cleveland launched on January 21, 2025, as a non-transport, first-response agency. They serve Beachwood, Cleveland Heights, and University Heights, and work in close collaboration with the 911 system. They are an affiliate of Central Hatzalah in NYC.

=== Pennsylvania ===
Philadelphia Hatzolah

Philadelphia Hatzolah provides first responder aid to the Northeast, Overbrook, and Wynnewood areas. For transport services, either 9-1-1 or private ambulance partners are utilized. Philadelphia Hatzolah has nineteen state-certified responders, including several full-time professional EMTs and Paramedics.

- Philadelphia (Service in the Somerton, Rawnhurst, and Overbrook)

Main Line Hatzalah

The newest Hatzalah division in Philadelphia launched in September 2025 as a first-response agency, bridging the gap until a 911 ambulance arrives. Its initial coverage areas include Bala Cynwyd, Merion Station, Wynnewood, Overbrook Farms, and Overbrook Park.

=== Texas ===
- Dallas
- Houston
