= Pays-d'en-Haut =

Pays-d'en-Haut may refer to:

- Pays d'en Haut, territory of New France (1610–1763)
- Les Pays-d'en-Haut Regional County Municipality, regional county municipality in Québec, Canada
  - Les Pays-d'en-Haut (electoral district), a federal electoral district

Pays-d'Enhaut may refer to:

- Riviera-Pays-d'Enhaut District, district of the Canton of Vaud, Switzerland
- Pays-d'Enhaut District, former district of the Canton of Vaud

== See also ==
- Highland (disambiguation)
- Pays (France)
