= Dorchester station (disambiguation) =

Dorchester station could refer to:

- Dorchester station in Chicago, Illinois
- Dorchester station (PAAC) in Pittsburgh, Pennsylvania
- Dorchester South railway station in Dorchester, Dorset, England
- Dorchester West railway station in Dorchester, Dorset, England
- Dorchester station, a predecessor of Talbot Avenue station
