= Highland Park, Lexington =

Highland Park
- Neighborhood of Lexington, Kentucky
- Interactive map of Highland Park
- Coordinates: 38.086°N 84.507°W
- Country: United States
- State: Kentucky
- County: Fayette
- City: Lexington

Area
  - Total: 0.13 sq mi (0.33 km^{2})

Population (2000)
  - Total: 108
  - Density: 848/sq mi (327.3/km^{2})
- Time zone: UTC-5 (Eastern (EST))
  - Summer (DST): UTC-4 (EDT)
- ZIP code: 40511
- Area code: 859

Highland Parks is a neighborhood in northwest Lexington, Kentucky, United States. It is a new subdivision started in the mid-2000s, located between the older Highlands and Oakwood neighborhoods. It is located south of Birch Drive and north of Boxwood Drive. It is bounded by Georgetown Road to the west and Oakwood Park to the east.

== Neighborhood statistics ==
- Area: 0.127 square miles (0.33 km^{2})
- Population: 108
- Population density: 851 people per square mile
- Median household income: $59,111
