= Highland Springs, California =

Highland Springs, California may refer to:

- Highland Springs, Lake County, California
- Highland Springs, Riverside County, California
