= HPHS =

HPHS may refer to:

- Hartford Public High School, in Connecticut, United States
- High Point High School, in Beltsville, Maryland, United States
- High School for Health Professions and Human Services, in New York City
- Highland Park High School (disambiguation)
- Hudson Park High School, in East London, South Africa
- Huntington Park High School, in California, United States
