= Highland Lakes =

Highland Lakes may refer to a place in the United States:

- Highland Lakes, Alabama, in the Birmingham metropolitan area
- Highland Lakes, Florida
- Highland Lakes, New Jersey
- Texas Highland Lakes
- Highland Lakes Campus, Oakland Community College, Michigan

== See also ==
- Highland Lake (disambiguation)
