= Highland (surname) =

Highland is a surname. Notable people with the surname include:

- Byron G. Highland (1934–1967), American combat photographer
- Jacob Highland (1932–2015), American volleyball player
- Patrick Highland (born 1841 or 1842), American Civil War Medal of Honor recipient
- Ron Highland (born 1947), American politician

== See also ==
- Hyland (disambiguation)
