= Highland Township =

Highland Township may refer to:

== Arkansas ==
- Highland Township, Sharp County, Arkansas, in Sharp County, Arkansas

== Illinois ==
- Highland Township, Grundy County, Illinois

== Indiana ==
- Highland Township, Franklin County, Indiana
- Highland Township, Greene County, Indiana
- Highland Township, Vermillion County, Indiana

== Iowa ==
- Highland Township, Clayton County, Iowa
- Highland Township, Greene County, Iowa
- Highland Township, Guthrie County, Iowa
- Highland Township, O'Brien County, Iowa
- Highland Township, Palo Alto County, Iowa
- Highland Township, Tama County, Iowa
- Highland Township, Union County, Iowa, in Union County, Iowa
- Highland Township, Wapello County, Iowa
- Highland Township, Washington County, Iowa
- Highland Township, Winneshiek County, Iowa, in Winneshiek County, Iowa

== Kansas ==
- Highland Township, Clay County, Kansas
- Highland Township, Harvey County, Kansas
- Highland Township, Jewell County, Kansas
- Highland Township, Lincoln County, Kansas, in Lincoln County, Kansas
- Highland Township, Morris County, Kansas, in Morris County, Kansas
- Highland Township, Washington County, Kansas, in Washington County, Kansas

== Michigan ==
- Highland Township, Oakland County, Michigan
- Highland Township, Osceola County, Michigan

== Minnesota ==
- Highland Township, Minnesota

== Missouri ==
- Highland Township, Lewis County, Missouri
- Highland Township, Oregon County, Missouri

== Nebraska ==
- Highland Township, Adams County, Nebraska
- Highland Township, Gage County, Nebraska

== North Dakota ==
- Highland Township, Cass County, North Dakota, in Cass County, North Dakota
- Highland Township, Hettinger County, North Dakota, in Hettinger County, North Dakota
- Highland Township, Sheridan County, North Dakota, in Sheridan County, North Dakota

== Ohio ==
- Highland Township, Defiance County, Ohio
- Highland Township, Muskingum County, Ohio

== Pennsylvania ==
- Highland Township, Adams County, Pennsylvania
- Highland Township, Chester County, Pennsylvania
- Highland Township, Clarion County, Pennsylvania
- Highland Township, Elk County, Pennsylvania

== South Dakota ==
- Highland Township, Brown County, South Dakota, in Brown County, South Dakota
- Highland Township, Brule County, South Dakota, in Brule County, South Dakota
- Highland Township, Charles Mix County, South Dakota, in Charles Mix County, South Dakota
- Highland Township, Day County, South Dakota, in Day County, South Dakota
- Highland Township, Lincoln County, South Dakota, in Lincoln County, South Dakota
- Highland Township, Minnehaha County, South Dakota, in Minnehaha County, South Dakota
- Highland Township, Perkins County, South Dakota, in Perkins County, South Dakota
