= Pieta, California =

Archaic placename in California, United States

Pieta
- Unincorporated community
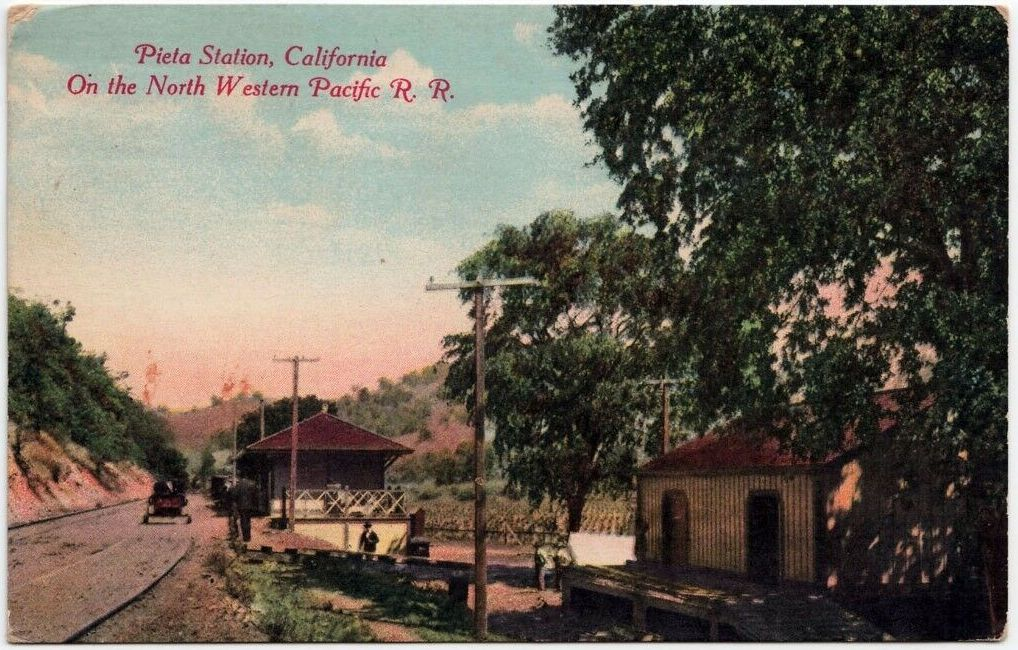
- 1912 postcard of the Northwestern Pacific Railroad station at Pieta

- Location in California Pieta (the United States)
- Coordinates: 38°55′36″N 123°03′19″W
- Country: United States
- State: California
- County: Mendocino
- Elevation: 476 ft (145 m)

Pieta is an archaic placename, former crossroads, and former railroad depot in Mendocino County, California, United States. It is located near the mouth of Pieta Creek, 5 miles (8 km) southeast of Hopland, at an elevation of 476 feet (145 m).

A post office, located on the eastern side of the San Francisco and North Pacific railroad tracks, operated at Pieta from 1891 to 1897. The name allegedly honors a local Native American chief. In 1891 a toll road was built at Pieta that led to Lake County. In 1896 the California Camera Club planned an outing to Pieta to photograph the "picturesque" scenery. In the 1900s, Hopland and Pieta were rivals for the traffic that came with mail delivery and stage service. Pieta was the rail stop for travelers to Bartlett Springs spa, which offered "medicinal soda magnesia baths". Stages connected from Pieta to Bartlett Springs, Highland Springs, Kelseyville, Soda Bay, and Lakeport. At least one proposed-but-never-built railroad through Lake County intended to use the Pieta stage stop as a terminus and then follow the old stage route along Pieta Creek.

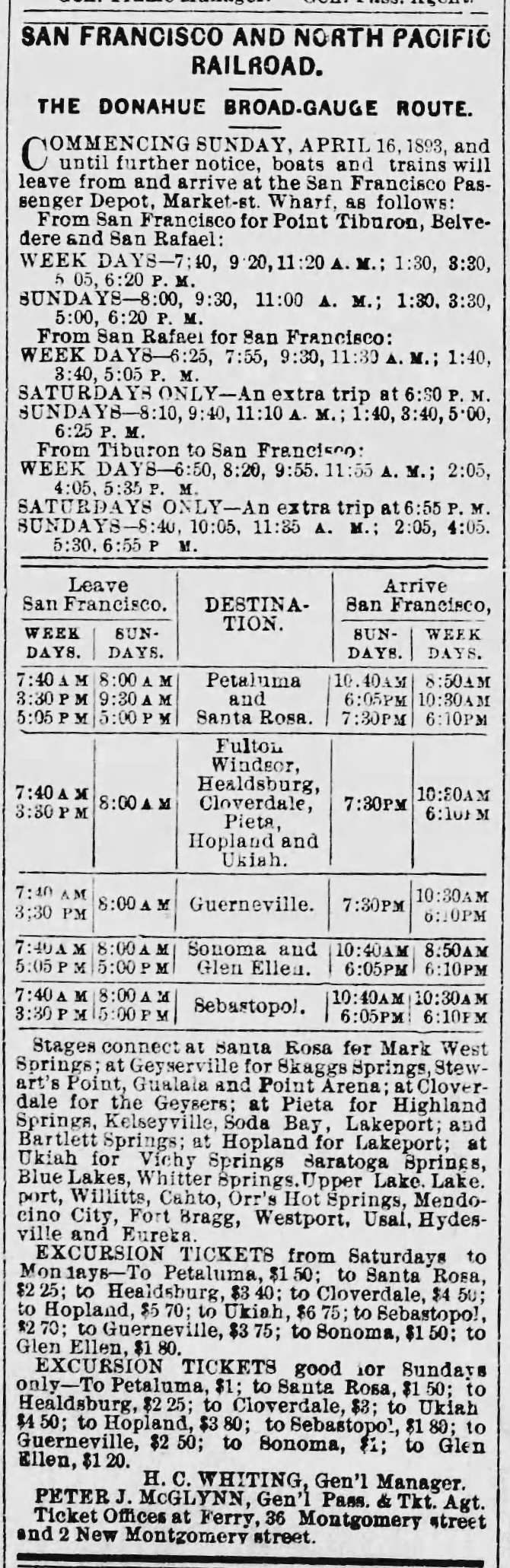
San Francisco and North Pacific Railroad - The Donohue Broad-Gauge Route

== See also ==
- Springs of Lake County, California
