= Highland Heights =

Highland Heights may refer to several places in the United States of America:

- Highland Heights, Kentucky
- Highland Heights, Ohio
- Highland Heights, Memphis, Tennessee
- Highland Heights, Virginia
