= Pays (France) =

Type of area in France

In France, pays (French: [pɛ.i]) is an area (French for country) whose inhabitants share common geographical, economic, cultural, or social interests, who have a right to enter into communal planning contracts under a law known as the Loi Pasqua or LOADT (Loi d'Orientation pour l'Aménagement et le Développement du Territoire; English: Directive law concerning territorial planning and development), which took effect on February 4, 1995.

It was augmented on June 25, 1999, by the Loi Voynet or LOADDT (Loi d'Orientation de l'Aménagement Durable du Territoire). The LOADDT enables the citizens of a community to form a legally recognized pays after deciding to do so by mutual consent; its aim is to help bring the inhabitants of urban and neighboring rural districts into dialogue and agreement.

The Council of Development in each pays assembles together the elected officials and the economic, social, and cultural actors, and their associates, into a deliberative forum to discuss the development policies which should be followed by the community. While the Council can give advice, submit proposals, and monitor development projects, it does not have the authority to make official decisions.

The Charter of the Pays makes it possible to fix the stakes and the objectives of the community. Few structures are recognized as pays Voynet, meaning nationwide, because the recognition criteria are sometimes far from what the pays are. Then again, several pays are recognized by the Commission Régionale d'aménagement et de développement du Territoire.

== Sense of the word ==
In France, the contract of the Pays can be signed among the members of the pays, or between the pays and its surrounding area, the department, the region, or with the national state when the stakes are well-identified.

In this context, the French term pays is not used in the modern sense of "country" but preserves the original meaning of the Latin word from which it was derived, pagus, which designated the territory controlled by a medieval count. The majority of pays are roughly coextensive with the old counties (e.g., county of Comminges, county of Ponthieu, etc). Today Pays de France still refers to a tiny area in northwest Ile-de-France, hence city names such as Roissy-en-France or Tremblay-en-France.

Although this word is frequently translated into English as country, its usage can mean a region or territory of a nation (bounded by borders and constituting a geographical entity) considered from the point of view of a certain identity or community of interest of its inhabitants. However, this usage is also sometimes found in English word country, for example for the constituent countries of the United Kingdom. It is held to be the geographical basis of the state. The word is also used less precisely as an alternative for état (state).

== Pays of Brittany ==
Brittany, consisting administratively of four departments, is also subdivided into 21 pays.

- pays de Brest
- pays de Cornouaille
- pays du Centre-Ouest de Bretagne
- pays de Morlaix
- Pays de Trégor-Goélo
- pays de Guingamp
- pays de Saint-Brieuc
- pays de Centre-Bretagne
- pays de Pontivy
- pays de Lorient
- pays d'Auray
- pays de Vannes
- pays de Ploërmel-Coeur de Bretagne
- pays de Brocéliande
- pays de Dinan
- pays de Saint-Malo
- pays de Fougères
- pays de Rennes
- Pays de Vitré-Porte de Bretagne
- pays es Vallons de Vilaine
- pays de Redon et Vilaine, note this pays straddles 3 departments, including one located outside the current Brittany administrative region, the Loire Atlantique department.

== Pays of Franche-Comté ==
La Franche-Comté, consisting of four departments, is also subdivided into 16 pays :

- pays de l'Aire Urbaine (Belfort-Montbéliard-Héricourt-Delle )
- pays du Doubs Central
- pays du Haut-Doubs
- pays Horloger
- pays de Loue Lison
- pays de Pierrefontaine Les Varans
- pays des Vosges Saônoises
- pays Dolois
- pays du Haut Revermont
- pays de la Haute Vallée de l'Ain
- pays des Lacs et de Petite Montagne
- pays Lédonien
- pays du Haut Jura
- pays Graylois
- pays des Sept Rivières
- pays de Vesoul et du Val de Saône

== See also ==
- Pays d'outre mer
- Pays-d'en-Haut (disambiguation)
- Pays des Illinois
- Natural regions of France
