= Highland Secondary School =

Highland Secondary School or Highlands Secondary School may refer to:

- École Highland Secondary School, Comox, British Columbia, Canada
- Highland Secondary School (Dundas), Ontario, Canada
- Grey Highlands Secondary School, Flesherton, Ontario, Canada
- Haliburton Highlands Secondary School, Haliburton, Ontario, Canada
- Almaguin Highlands Secondary School, South River, Ontario, Canada
- Highland ISD Secondary School, Roscoe, Texas
- Highlands Secondary School, Enfield, Middlesex, United Kingdom

== See also ==
- Highland High School (disambiguation)
