= Highland Lake =

Highland Lake may refer to:

== Bodies of water ==
- Highland Lake (Winchester, Connecticut)
- Highland Lake (Illinois)
- Highland Lake (Bridgton, Maine)
- Highland Lake (Presumpscot River), in Windham, Maine
- Highland Lake (Columbia Heights, Minnesota)
- Highland Lake (Stoddard, New Hampshire)
- Highland Lake (Warren Center, Pennsylvania)

== Places ==
- Highland Lake, Alabama
- Highland Lakes, New Jersey
- Highlandlake, Colorado

== See also ==
- Highland Lakes (disambiguation)
