= Highland High School =

Highland High School or Highlands High School may refer to:

In the United States:

- Highland High School (Arizona)
- Highland High School (Arkansas)
- Highland High School (Bakersfield, California)
- Highlands High School (known as Highlands Academy of Arts & Design from 2007 to 2010) (North Highlands, California)
- Highland High School (Palmdale, California)
- Highland High School (Colorado)
- Highland High School (Craigmont, Idaho)
- Highland High School (Pocatello, Idaho)
- Highland High School (Illinois)
- Highland High School (Anderson, Indiana), now Highland Middle School
- Highland High School (Highland, Indiana)
- Highlands High School (Kentucky)
- Highland Regional High School, New Jersey
- Highland High School (Albuquerque), New Mexico
- Highland High School (Highland, New York)
- Highland High School (Medina, Ohio)
- Highland High School (Sparta, Ohio)
- Highlands High School (Pennsylvania)
- Highlands High School (San Antonio), Texas
- Highland High School (Utah)
- Highland High School (Monterey, Virginia)
- Highland High School (Washington)
- Highland High School (Highland, Wisconsin)

It may also refer to:

- Lake Highland Preparatory School, Orlando, Florida, United States
- Highland Regional High School, Blackwood, New Jersey, United States
- Lake Highlands High School, Dallas, Texas, United States
- Northern Highlands Regional High School, Allendale, Bergen County, New Jersey, United States
- Highland High School, a fictional school featured in the animated series Beavis and Butt-head

== See also ==
- Highland Junior High School (disambiguation)
- Highland Park High School (disambiguation)
- Highland Secondary School (disambiguation)
