= Santa Barbara station (PAAC) =

Santa Barbara
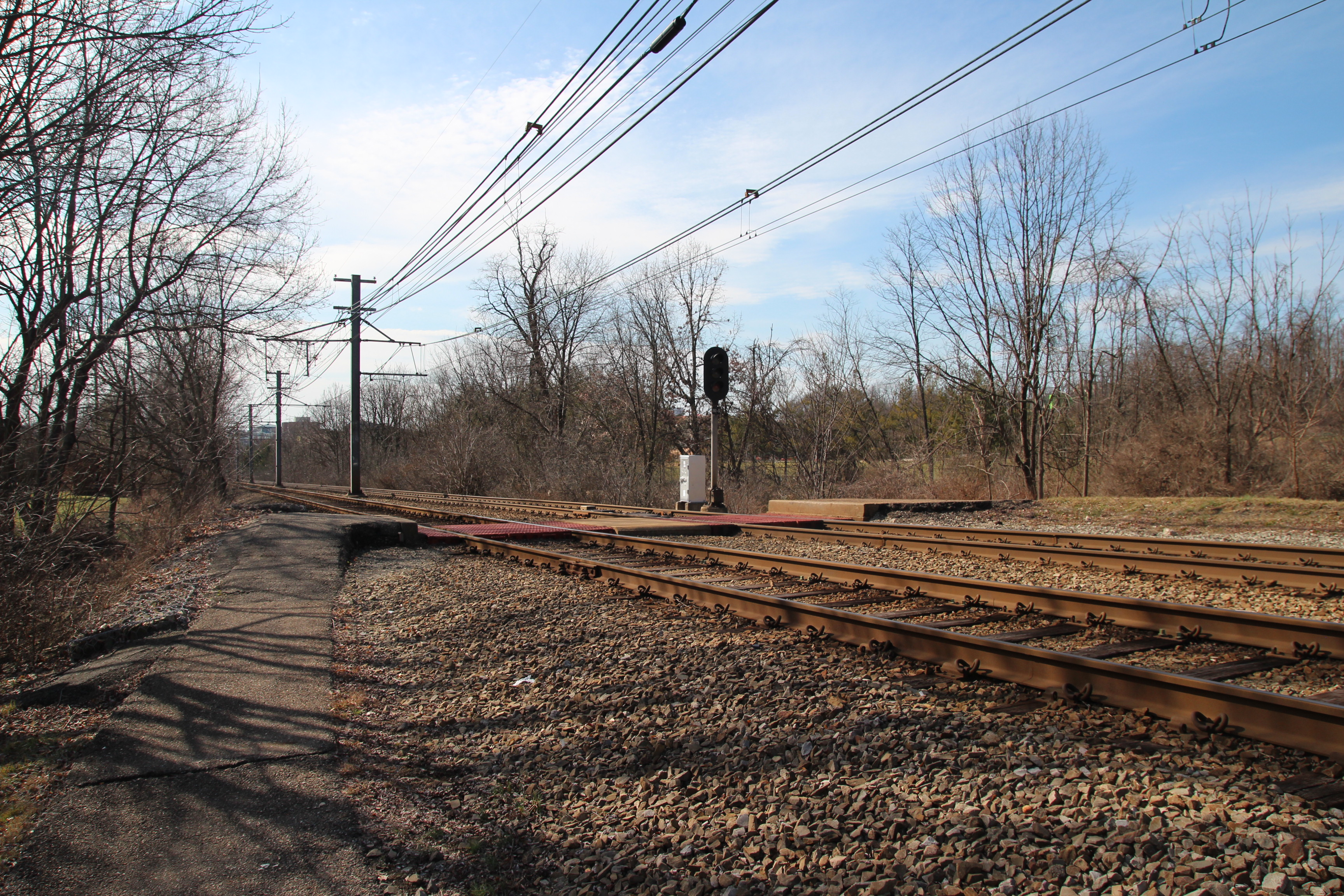
- Station site in 2017. A crossing remains.

General information
- Location: To Pittsburgh: Milford Drive at Wyncote Road; To South Hills Village: South Conestoga Drive; Bethel Park, Pennsylvania
- Coordinates: 40.3473°N 80.0419°W
- Owner: Port Authority
- Tracks: 2

History
- Opened: May 22, 1987
- Closed: June 25, 2012

Services
Preceding station	Port Authority of Allegheny County	Following station
Highland toward Allegheny	Blue Line South Hills Village via Overbrook	Bethel Village toward South Hills Village
Highland toward Allegheny	Red Line South Hills Village via Beechview	Bethel Village toward South Hills Village
Highland toward Gateway	47D Drake 1984–1993	Bethel Village toward Drake
Location

Santa Barbara was a station on the Port Authority of Allegheny County's light rail network, located in Bethel Park, Pennsylvania. The street level stop was designed as a small commuter stop, serving area residents who walked to the train so they could be taken toward Downtown Pittsburgh. Both directional stops were only accessible via walkways near the intersection of Milford Drive and Wyncote Road and beyond the dead end of South Conestoga Drive.

Santa Barbara was one of eleven stops closed on June 25, 2012 as part of a system-wide consolidation effort.
