= Hylan =

Hylan may refer to:

- John F. Hylan, politician and Mayor of New York City from 1918 to 1925
- Hylan-A and Hylan-B, trade names for hyaluronic acid

== See also ==
- Hyland (disambiguation)
