= Bethel Village station =

Railway stop in Pennsylvania

Bethel Village
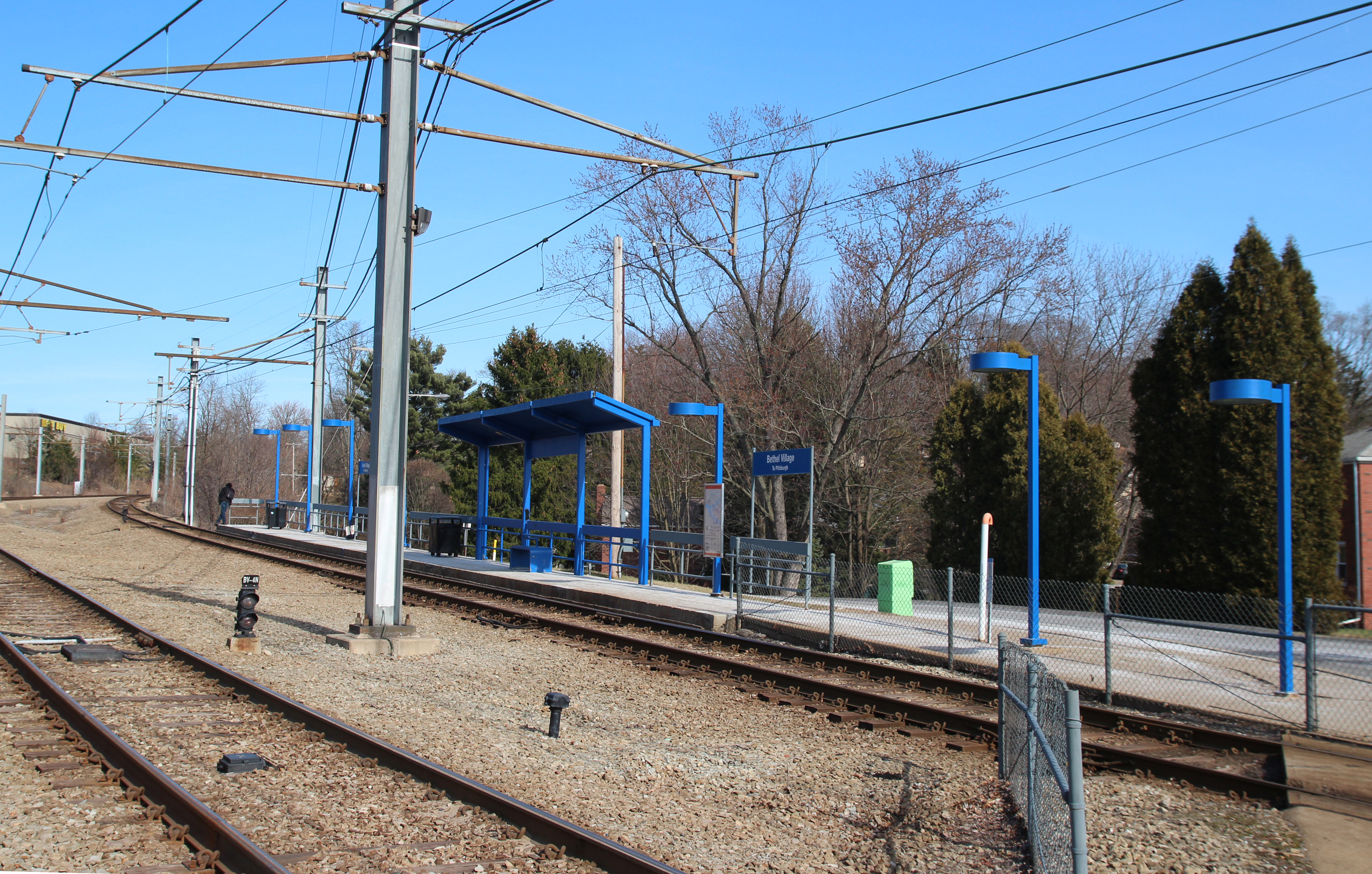

General information
- Location: Cambridge Road at Avon Lane; Bethel Park, Pennsylvania
- Coordinates: 40.3443°N 80.0464°W
- Owner: Pittsburgh Regional Transit
- Line: South Hills Village Line
- Platforms: 2 side platforms
- Tracks: 2

Construction
- Structure type: At-grade
- Accessible: No, under construction

History
- Opened: April 15, 1984

Passengers
- 2018: 81 (weekday boardings)

Services
Preceding station	Pittsburgh Regional Transit	Following station
Highland toward Allegheny	Blue Line	Dorchester toward South Hills Village
Highland toward Allegheny	Red Line	Dorchester toward South Hills Village
Former services
Preceding station	Port Authority of Allegheny County	Following station
Santa Barbara Closed 2012 toward Allegheny	Blue Line South Hills Village via Overbrook	Dorchester toward South Hills Village
Santa Barbara Closed 2012 toward Allegheny	Red Line South Hills Village via Beechview	Dorchester toward South Hills Village
Santa Barbara toward Gateway	47D Drake 1984–1993	Dorchester toward Drake
Location

Bethel Village station is a stop on the Pittsburgh Light Rail network, operated by Pittsburgh Regional Transit, serving Bethel Park, Pennsylvania. It is a small, street-level stop used by local residents traveling to and from Downtown Pittsburgh. The station consists of two low-level side platforms for street-level boarding and is not accessible.

== History ==
The station opened as part of a light rail line between South Hills Village and Castle Shannon in 1984 and served both residential and commercial locations.

The stop featured a turnaround loop for PCC's operating on the 47D Drake service, and was intended for cars operating on shuttle services that terminated at Dorchester. However, the loop saw very limited usage, as cars were prone to derailing on its tight curve, and was dismantled in 1997.

During the July 2022 emergency closures, in which the entirety of Pittsburgh's Red Line would close, PRT announced that the station would receive more limited service as well as limited delays, as the Blue and Silver line's inbound tracks would be used for all inbound service.

In 2022, the Federal Transit Administration awarded Pittsburgh Regional Transit $28.4 million to construct accessible platforms at four Red Line stops, including Bethel Village.

== Location ==
The station is sandwiched between the intersection of Avon Lane and Cambridge Road in Bethel Park, and Oxford Drive. The station is the primary light rail access point for one of Giant Eagle's Market District stores serving the South Hills Village, located about 1100 feet away by foot.

The station is also mentioned as a primary access point for Bethel Park's UPMC Field, which is a community baseball diamond used by Bethel Park municipal baseball programs.
