= Dorchester station (Pittsburgh) =

Dorchester
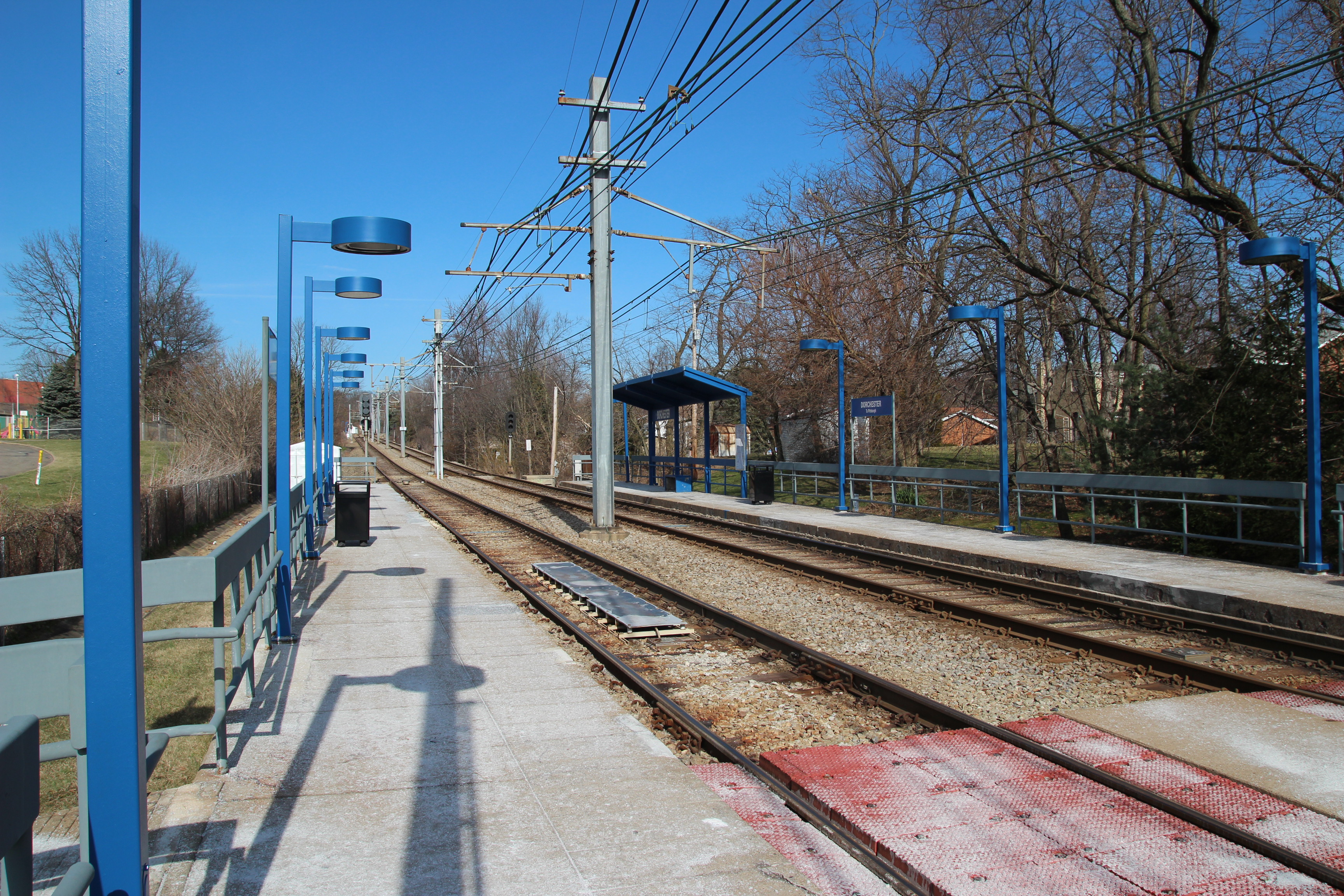

General information
- Location: Spartan Road and Graeser Avenue; Bethel Park, Pennsylvania
- Coordinates: 40.3408°N 80.0481°W
- Owner: Pittsburgh Regional Transit
- Line: South Hills Village Line
- Platforms: 2 side platforms
- Tracks: 2

Construction
- Structure type: At-grade
- Accessible: No, under construction

History
- Opened: April 15, 1984

Passengers
- 2018: 59 (weekday boardings)

Services
Preceding station	Pittsburgh Regional Transit	Following station
Bethel Village toward Allegheny	Blue Line	South Hills Village Terminus
Bethel Village toward Allegheny	Red Line	South Hills Village Terminus
Former services
Preceding station	Port Authority of Allegheny County	Following station
Bethel Village toward Gateway	47D Drake 1984–1993	Bethel Church toward Drake
Location

Dorchester station is a stop on the Pittsburgh Light Rail network, operated by Pittsburgh Regional Transit, serving Bethel Park, Pennsylvania. It is a small, street-level stop used by local residents traveling to and from Downtown Pittsburgh. The station consists of two low-level side platforms for street-level boarding and is not accessible.

In May 2024, the Federal Transit Administration awarded Pittsburgh Regional Transit $8 million to construct accessible platforms at ten Red Line stops, including Dorchester.
