= Highland station (Pittsburgh) =

Highland
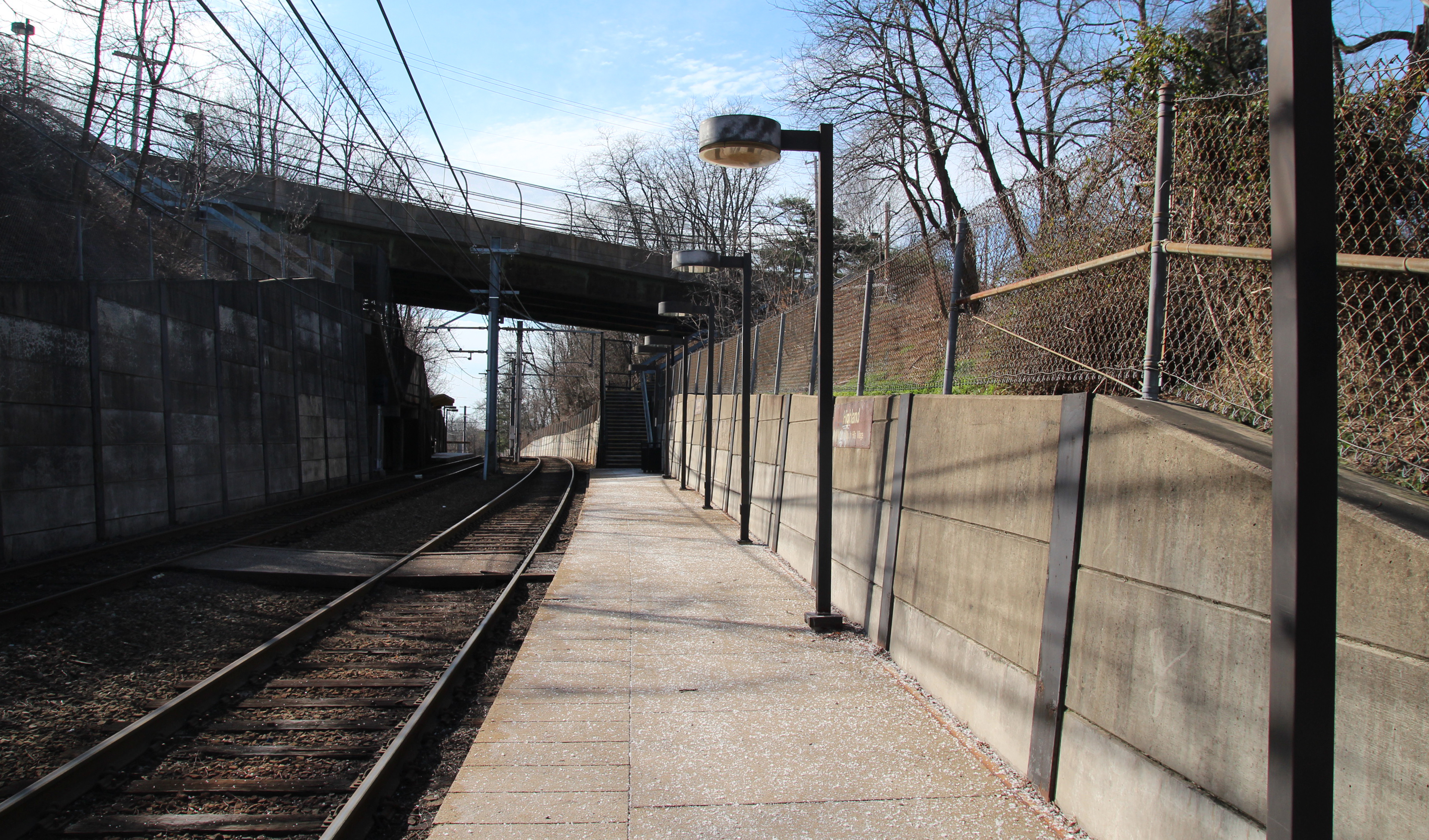

General information
- Location: Highland Road at Meadowbrook Drive; Bethel Park, Pennsylvania
- Coordinates: 40.3484°N 80.0399°W
- Owner: Pittsburgh Regional Transit
- Line: South Hills Village Line
- Platforms: 2 side platforms
- Tracks: 2

Construction
- Structure type: Below-grade
- Accessible: No, under construction

History
- Opened: April 15, 1984

Passengers
- 2018: 44 (weekday boardings)

Services
Preceding station	Pittsburgh Regional Transit	Following station
Casswell toward Allegheny	Blue Line	Bethel Village toward South Hills Village
Casswell toward Allegheny	Red Line	Bethel Village toward South Hills Village
Former services
Preceding station	Port Authority of Allegheny County	Following station
Casswell toward Allegheny	Blue Line South Hills Village via Overbrook	Santa Barbara Closed 2012 toward South Hills Village
Casswell toward Allegheny	Red Line South Hills Village via Beechview	Santa Barbara Closed 2012 toward South Hills Village
Casswell toward Gateway	47D Drake 1984–1993	Santa Barbara toward Drake
Location

Highland station is a stop on the Pittsburgh Light Rail network, operated by Pittsburgh Regional Transit, serving Bethel Park, Pennsylvania. It is a small, street-level stop used by local residents traveling to and from Downtown Pittsburgh. The station consists of two low-level side platforms for street-level boarding and is not accessible.

Located in a railroad cut, a staircase to each platform is available from Highland Road, which crosses over the line on an overpass. In addition, access to the outbound platform is available through a walkway which leads to Santa Fe Drive. There is no crossing for passengers between the platforms at platform level.

In May 2024, the Federal Transit Administration awarded Pittsburgh Regional Transit $8 million to construct accessible platforms at ten Red Line stops, including Highland.
