= Highland Village =

Highland Village may refer to:

- Highland Village, California
- Highland Village, Indiana
- Highland Village, Nova Scotia
- Highland Village, Texas
- Highland Village, Houston, Texas
