= Highland, Wisconsin =

Highland is the name of several locations in Wisconsin:

- Highland, Douglas County, Wisconsin, a town
- Highland, Iowa County, Wisconsin, a town
  - Highland (village), Iowa County, Wisconsin
- Highland Beach, Wisconsin, an unincorporated community
- Highland Park, Wisconsin, an unincorporated community
