= Hyland Hotel =

Hyland Hotel may refer to:

- Hyland Hotel (Palmer, Alaska), listed on the National Register of Historic Places in Matanuska-Susitna Borough, Alaska
- Hyland Hotel (Monticello, Utah), listed on the National Register of Historic Places in San Juan County, Utah
