= Highland School =

Highland School may refer to:

- Highland School (Boulder, Colorado), listed on the National Register of Historic Places (NRHP)
- Highland School (Atlanta, Georgia), listed on the NRHP in Fulton County, Georgia
- Highland School (Reading, Massachusetts), NRHP-listed
- Highland School (Hickory, North Carolina), listed on the NRHP in Catawba County, North Carolina
- Highland School (Warrenton, Virginia)
- The Highland School, (Ellenboro, West Virginia)
- Highland School of Technology, in Gastonia, North Carolina
