= Highlands, Johannesburg =

Highlands
- Location within Gauteng Location within South Africa
- Coordinates: 26.141°S 28.081°E
- Country: South Africa
- Province: Gauteng
- Municipality: City of Johannesburg
- Main Place: Johannesburg

Area
  - Total: 0.21 km^{2} (0.081 sq mi)

Population (2011)
  - Total: 1,457
  - Density: 6,900/km^{2} (18,000/sq mi)

Racial makeup (2011)
  - Black African: 95.3%
  - Coloured: 1.5%
  - Indian/Asian: 0.8%
  - White: 1.8%
  - Other: 0.5%

First languages (2011)
  - Zulu: 37.5%
  - Southern Ndebele: 17.6%
  - English: 6.5%
  - Xhosa: 5.1%
  - Other: 33.4%
- Time zone: UTC+2 (SAST)
- Postal code (street): 2198

Highlands is a suburb of Johannesburg, South Africa. It is located in Region F of the City of Johannesburg Metropolitan Municipality. Highlands occupies one of the highest points of Johannesburg.
