= Oakwood, Lexington =

Oakwood
- Neighborhood of Lexington, Kentucky
- Interactive map of Oakwood
- Coordinates: 38.082°N 84.506°W
- Country: United States
- State: Kentucky
- County: Fayette
- City: Lexington

Area
  - Total: 0.141 sq mi (0.365 km^{2})

Population (2000)
  - Total: 328
  - Density: 2,334/sq mi (901/km^{2})
- Time zone: UTC-5 (Eastern (EST))
  - Summer (DST): UTC-4 (EDT)
- ZIP code: 40511
- Area code: 859

Oakwood is a neighborhood in northwestern Lexington, Kentucky, United States. Its boundaries are Georgetown Road to the west, Oakwood Park to the east, the Nandino Parkway industrial complex to the south, and the newer Highland Park neighborhood to the north.

== Neighborhood statistics ==
- Area: 0.141 square miles (0.37 km^{2})
- Population: 328
- Population density: 2,334 people per square mile (901 people/km^{2})
- Median household income: $59,111
