= Highland, Indiana =

Highland is the name of some places in the U.S. state of Indiana:

- Highland, Lake County, Indiana
- Highland, Vanderburgh County, Indiana
- Highland, Vermillion County, Indiana
- Highland, Washington County, Indiana
