= The Highland =

Historic house in Massachusetts, United States

- U.S. National Register of Historic Places
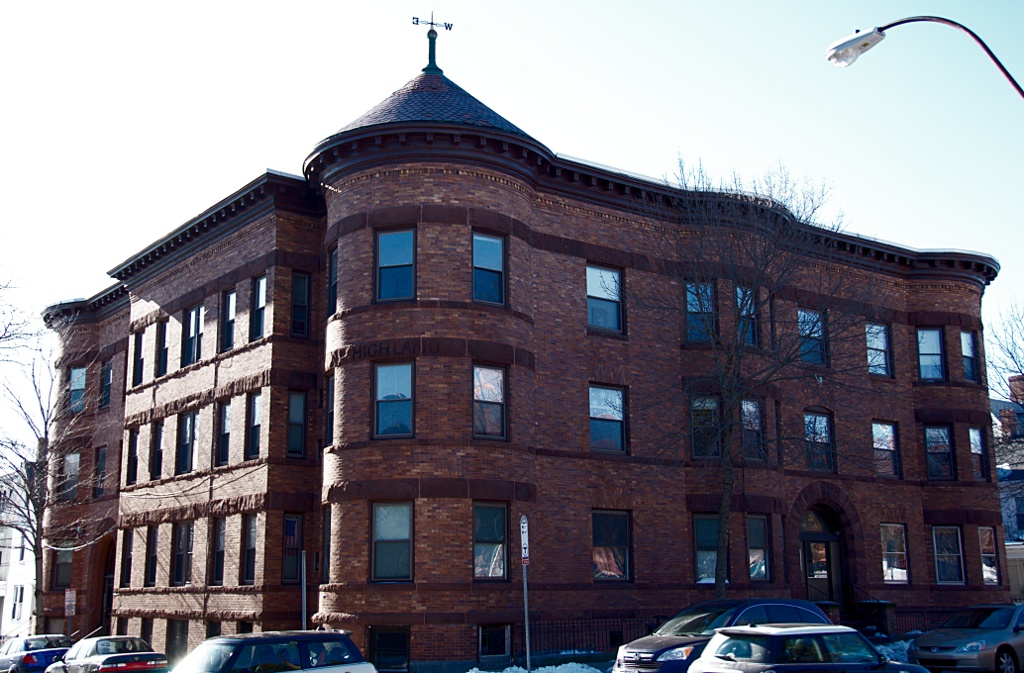

- Location within Massachusetts Location within the United States
- Location: 66 Highland Avenue; Somerville, Massachusetts
- Coordinates: 42°23′8.99″N 71°5′46.82″W
- Built: 1892
- Architect: Samuel D. Kelley
- Architectural style: Romanesque
- MPS: Somerville MPS
- NRHP reference No.: 89001260
- Added to NRHP: September 18, 1989

The Highland is a historic multiunit residence at 66 Highland Avenue in Somerville, Massachusetts. The three-story brick building was built in 1892 to a design by architect Samuel D. Kelley. It is one of the city's more elegant late 19th-century apartment houses, built during its rapid expansion in the late 19th century. The building listed on the National Register of Historic Places in 1989.

== Description and history ==
The Highland is set on the south side of Highland Avenue on Central Hill, directly opposite the city's high school. It is a three-story brick building, Richardsonian Romanesque in style, with brownstone trim, and a conical roof on its corner turret. Brownstone beltcourses, varying in thickness, separate the basement, first, and second floors, and also separate the top of the third floor from the cornice, which has a band of dentil brickwork below the modillioned roof line. The main facade is six bays wide, divided into two similar sections having a rounded bay at the right. The main entrance is set in the third bay from the right beneath a large round brownstone arch.

The building was designed by Samuel D. Kelley, a noted local designer of apartment buildings, and built in 1892, during the city's rapid expansion as a streetcar and railroad suburb. It was marketed as an exclusive and elegant accommodation within walking distance of a train station with frequent service into Boston. It is one of the city's finest residential Romanesque designs.

== See also ==
- National Register of Historic Places listings in Somerville, Massachusetts
