= Highland Township, Lewis County, Missouri =

Township in Lewis County, Missouri, U.S.

Coordinates: 39.9911°N 91.7036°W

Highland Township is an inactive township in Lewis County, in the U.S. state of Missouri.

Highland Township was established in 1838, and named for its lofty elevation.
