= Highland Peak =

Highland Peak may refer to the following mountains in the United States:

- Highland Peak (California)
- Highland Peak (Colorado)
- Highland Peak (Nevada)
