= Highland Middle School =

Highland Middle School can refer to several schools in North America:

- Highland Middle School (Libertyville, Illinois)
- Highland Middle School (Louisville, Kentucky)
- Highland Middle School (Toronto), Ontario, formerly named Highland Junior High School
- Highland Oaks Middle School, Miami-Dade County, Florida
- Highland High School (Anderson, Indiana) now known as Higland Middle School
