= Highlands, Lexington =

Highlands
- Neighborhood of Lexington, Kentucky
- Interactive map of Highlands
- Coordinates: 38.090°N 84.507°W
- Country: United States
- State: Kentucky
- County: Fayette
- City: Lexington

Area
  - Total: 0.12 sq mi (0.31 km^{2})

Population (2000)
  - Total: 366
  - Density: 3,058/sq mi (1,180.6/km^{2})
- Time zone: UTC-5 (Eastern (EST))
  - Summer (DST): UTC-4 (EDT)
- ZIP code: 40511
- Area code: 859

Highlands is a neighborhood in northwestern Lexington, Kentucky, United States. Its boundaries are Georgetown Road to the west, Oakwood Park to the east, and Citation Boulevard to the east. There are plans to develop a vacant field north of Highlands, it is unclear whether it will become part of Highlands or be a separate neighborhood.

== Neighborhood statistics ==
- Area: 0.119 square miles (0.31 km^{2})
- Population as of 2000: 366
- Population density: 3,067 people per square mile (1,184 people/km^{2})
- Median household income: $59,111
