= Pat Hyland =

Pat Hyland may refer to:

- Pat Hyland (jockey) (1941–2026), Australian jockey and horse trainer
- Lawrence A. Hyland (1897–1989), known as Pat, American electrical engineer
