= Highland Park station =

Highland Park station may refer to:

- Highland Park station (Illinois)
- Highland Park station (Los Angeles Metro)
- Highland Park Police Station, California
