= Highland Springs Reservoir =

- Location within California Location within the United States
- Location: Lake County, California
- Coordinates: 38°56′30.0″N 122°54′23.2″W
- Type: reservoir

Highland Springs Reservoir is a reservoir located about 4.5 miles southwest of Kelseyville, California adjacent to Highland Springs. The area around the reservoir as well as the reservoir itself is a popular recreation site with activities such as disc golf, and a hiking trail. The reservoir is stocked with warm water fish such as largemouth bass, sunfish, bluegill, catfish and bullhead.
