= Highland County =

Highland County is the name of two counties in the United States:

- Highland County, Ohio
- Highland County, Virginia

== See also ==
- Highlands County, Florida
- Highland (council area), Scotland
