= Highland Beach =

Highland Beach may refer to:

== Places in the United States ==
- Highland Beach, Florida
- Highland Beach, Maryland
- Highland Beach, Wisconsin

== Fictional locations ==
- Highland Beach (The 4400), a Seattle-area lakeshore in the television show The 4400
