= Patrick Highland =

- Born: 1841 or 1842; Tipperary, Ireland
- Military career
- Allegiance: United States of America
- Branch: United States Army
- Service years: 1864–1865
- Rank: Sergeant
- Units: Company D, 23rd Illinois Volunteer Infantry Regiment
- Conflicts: Third Battle of Petersburg; American Civil War
- Awards: Medal of Honor

Patrick Highland was an American soldier who fought in the American Civil War. Highland received his country's highest award for bravery during combat, the Medal of Honor. Highland's medal was won for his 'conspicuous gallantry as Color Bearer' in the assault on Fort Gregg during the Third Battle of Petersburg, in Virginia on April 2, 1865. He was honored with the award on May 12, 1865.

Highland was born in Tipperary, Ireland, and in February 1864 (at the age of 22) joined the US Army from Chicago. He mustered out with his regiment in July 1865.

== Medal of Honor citation ==
The President of the United States of America, in the name of Congress, takes pleasure in presenting the Medal of Honor to Corporal Patrick Highland, United States Army, for extraordinary heroism on 2 April 1865, while serving with Company D, 23d Illinois Infantry, in action at Petersburg, Virginia, for conspicuous gallantry as Color Bearer in the assault on Fort Gregg.

== See also ==
- List of American Civil War Medal of Honor recipients: G–L
