= Hyland's =

North American homeopathic brand

- Industry: Homeopathy
- Founded: 1903
- Headquarters: Los Angeles, CA, United States
- Number of employees: 51-200 (2017)
- Website: www.hylands.com

Hyland's is a brand of homeopathic products sold in the United States and Canada. Hyland's operates in the United States as Hyland's Inc and in Canada as Hyland's Homeopathic Canada Inc and is a division of Standard Homeopathic Co..

== History ==
The company was founded in 1903 in Los Angeles as Standard Homeopathic Pharmacy. It was purchased by George H. Hyland in 1910 and the name was changed to Standard Homeopathic Company. Hyland's began selling products in Canada in 1990.

In 2013, the FDA conducted a review of Hyland's labeling and marketing information which revealed numerous products misbranded in violation of sections 503 and 301 of the Federal Food, Drug, and Cosmetic Act (FD&C Act) [21 U.S.C. §§ 353 and 331]. This review included the products for "Infant Earache Drops", "Restful Legs", "Teething Tablets", and other products. The products are marketed as over-the-counter for diagnoses and treatments that require a physician's consultation.

== Safety concerns ==
In 2004, Hyland's Teething Tablets were the second most popular teething product.

The FDA warned consumers about Hyland's teething products in 2010, citing concern over the toxicity of its belladonna ingredient and lack of child proof caps. Hyland's voluntarily recalled its Hyland's Teething Tablets product after the 2010 warning in both the US and Canada. Hyland's began selling a reformulated version of the product with a child proof cap in 2011.

In 2016, Hyland's indicated it would stop selling its Hyland's Teething Tablets product in the U.S. after the FDA claimed it received reports of 10 child deaths and 400 adverse effects associated with the product. Hyland's calls the FDA's claims unsubstantiated. Hyland's suggests other possible causes, noting possible allergies and citing articles listing possible causes of seizures in children unrelated to the formulation of its product. The FDA confirmed in 2017 that inconsistent and sometimes excessive levels of belladonna had been found in the product.
