= Highland Township, Oregon County, Missouri =

Township in Oregon County, Missouri, U.S.

Coordinates: 36.7139°N 91.5892°W

Highland Township is an inactive township in Oregon County, in the U.S. state of Missouri.

Highland Township was so named on account of its elevation.
