= Highland, West Virginia =

Highland, West Virginia may refer to the following communities:

- Highland, Marion County, West Virginia
- Highland, Ritchie County, West Virginia
