= Highland Junior High School =

Highland Junior High School, Highlands Junior High School or Highlands Junior School may refer to:

In Canada:

- Highland Junior High School (Toronto), Ontario (now named Highland Middle School)
- Highlands Junior High School (Edmonton), Alberta

In the United States:

- Highland Junior High School (Mesa), Arizona
- Highland Junior High School (Gilbert), Arizona
- Highland Junior High School (Battle Creek), Michigan
- Highland Junior High School (Hobbs), New Mexico
- Highland Junior High School (Barberton), Ohio
- Highlands Junior High School (Baytown), Texas
- Highland Junior High School (Ogden), Utah

In the UK:

- Highlands Junior School (Ilford), London
