= Highland Lake (Presumpscot River) =

- Location within Maine Location within the United States
- Location: Cumberland County, Maine
- Coordinates: 43°46′N 70°21′W
- Lake type: Reservoir
- Primary outflows: Mill Brook
- Basin countries: United States
- Max. length: 3 mi (4.8 km)
- Surface area: 640 acres (260 ha)
- Max. depth: 67 feet (20 m)
- Water volume: 14,025 acre⋅ft (17,300,000 m^{3})
- Surface elevation: 190 ft (58 m)

Highland Lake is a lake in the U.S. state of Maine. Formerly known as Duck Pond, the lake extends from the northern tip of Westbrook through the western edge of Falmouth into east Windham, Maine. The south end of the lake overflows via Mill Brook 4 miles (6.4 km) through Westbrook to the Presumpscot River at Riverton. The shoreline of the lake is heavily developed with residences, seasonal cabins, and a state-owned parking area off Mast Road in Falmouth for the launch of canoes and car-top boats. The deeper northern basin of the lake in Windham has been stocked with brown trout, splake, alewife, and occasionally brook trout and land-locked Atlantic salmon. Highland Lake's shallow southern basin is favorable habitat for white perch and chain pickerel, and has been stocked with largemouth bass.
