= William Hyland =

William Hyland is the name of:

- William F. Hyland (1923–2013), Attorney General of New Jersey, 1974–1978
- William G. Hyland (1929–2008), deputy national security adviser to Gerald R. Ford and editor of Foreign Affairs
- Willie Hyland (born 1989), Irish hurler
