= Highland Avenue =

Highland Avenue may refer to:

== Historic districts ==
- Highland Avenue Historic District (Birmingham, Alabama), listed on the National Register of Historic Places in Birmingham, Alabama
- Highland Avenue Historic District (Lexington, Missouri), listed on the National Register of Historic Places in Lafayette County, Missouri

== Streets ==
- Highland Avenue (Atlanta), also North Highland Avenue
- Highland Avenue (Augusta, Georgia)
- Highland Avenue (Baltimore)
- Highland Avenue (Los Angeles)

== Transportation ==
- Highland Avenue station (NJ Transit)
- Highland Avenue station (SEPTA)
