= Highland Heights, Virginia =

Unincorporated community in Virginia, US

Coordinates: 37°32′57″N 75°50′01″W

Highland Heights is an unincorporated community in Northampton County, Virginia, United States.
