= Highland Community College =

Highland Community College may refer to:

- Highland Community College (Illinois), Freeport, Illinois, U.S.
- Highland Community College (Kansas), Highland, Kansas, U.S.
