= Highland Township, Adams County, Nebraska =

Township in Nebraska, United States

Coordinates: 40°39′22″N 98°26′14″W

Highland Township is one of sixteen townships in Adams County, Nebraska, United States. The population was 354 at the 2020 census.

== See also ==
- County government in Nebraska
