= Highland Lakes, Florida =

Neighborhood in Ojus, Florida, U.S.

Highland Lakes is a neighborhood of Ojus, a CDP and unincorporated community in Miami-Dade County, Florida, United States.

== Geography ==
It is located at 25.968°N 80.163°W, with an elevation 7 feet (2.1 m).
