= Highlands School, Grange Park =

Highlands School

Location
- 148 Worlds End Lane; London, N21 1QQ; England
- 51°38′56″N 0°06′28″W

Information
- Type: Community school
- Established: 2000
- Local authority: Enfield
- Department for Education URN: 132256 Tables
- Ofsted: Reports
- Headteacher: Vincent McInerney
- Gender: Coeducational
- Age: 11 to 18
- Enrolment: 1558
- Houses: Beech; Oak; Rowan; Willow
- Colour: Green
- Website: http://www.highlands.enfield.sch.uk/

Highlands School is a comprehensive school in Grange Park, Enfield, London, England. The school opened in 2000 in new purpose-built accommodation. From September 2006 the school has been full with pupils from Years 7 - 13 including a large sixth form.

== Houses ==
Highlands School has four houses, Willow, Beech, Oak and Rowan. The students wear a dark green uniform with a dark green tie that has stripes of white.

== International Baccalaureate ==
It has been an International Baccalaureate World School since December 2004, and sixth form students may take the International Baccalaureate Diploma (IB) instead of A-level examinations. Since the sixth form opened in September 2005, the first year of IB students took their exams in 2007, and 55% failed. Seven students were disqualified for alleged malpractice. Bruce Goddard, the headteacher at the time, was quoted as saying, "In some cases we are currently lodging appeals against this." The school has since decided to drop the IB and switch to A-levels.

== BTEC ==
Highlands also offers a variety of BTEC courses, all of which are fully coursework (both practical and written) and include BTEC Media and Business Studies. Unlike the IB, Highlands has decided to continue this course.

== OFSTED ==
Highlands has received two OFSTED Outstanding Ratings: One in 2011 and one in 2014.

Inspection record:	March 2003	November 2006	January 2009	March 2011	February 2014	July 2021
Ofsted	Satisfactory	—N/a	Satisfactory	Outstanding	Outstanding	—N/a

== Results ==
Track Record:	2017	2018	2019
5+ GCSEs (or equivalent) A*-C incl. English & Maths Note: 2017, 2018, 2019 involve 9-1 exams	53%	58%	58%

Track Record:	2017	2018	2019
Progress 8 Benchmark	0.17	0.34	0.44
Progress Description	Above Average	Above Average	Above Average
