= Highlands Elementary School =

Highlands Elementary School may refer to:

== In Canada ==
- Highlands Elementary School (Cranbrook), Cranbrook, British Columbia
- Highlands Elementary School (North Vancouver), North Vancouver, British Columbia
- Hart Highlands Elementary School, Prince George, British Columbia

== In the United States ==
- Highlands Elementary School (Saugus, California), Santa Clarita, California
- Monterey Highlands Elementary School, Monterey Park, California
- Highlands Elementary School (Braintree, Massachusetts), Braintree, Massachusetts
- Highlands Elementary School (Sugar Land, Texas), Sugar Land, Texas
- Highlands Elementary School (Spring Valley, CA), Spring Valley, CA
