= Highland Park High School =

Several high schools are known as Highland Park High School including:

- Highland Park Continuation in Los Angeles, California
- Highland Park High School (Highland Park, Illinois) in Highland Park, Illinois
- Highland Park High School (Topeka, Kansas) in Topeka, Kansas
- Highland Park High School (Minnesota) in Saint Paul, Minnesota
- Highland Park Community High School (Highland Park, Michigan) in Highland Park, Michigan
- Highland Park High School (New Jersey) in Highland Park, New Jersey
- Highland Park Independent School District (Potter County, Texas) in Amarillo, Texas
- Highland Park High School (University Park, Texas) in University Park, Texas
