= Highland Springs, Lake County, California =

Highland Springs
- Unincorporated community
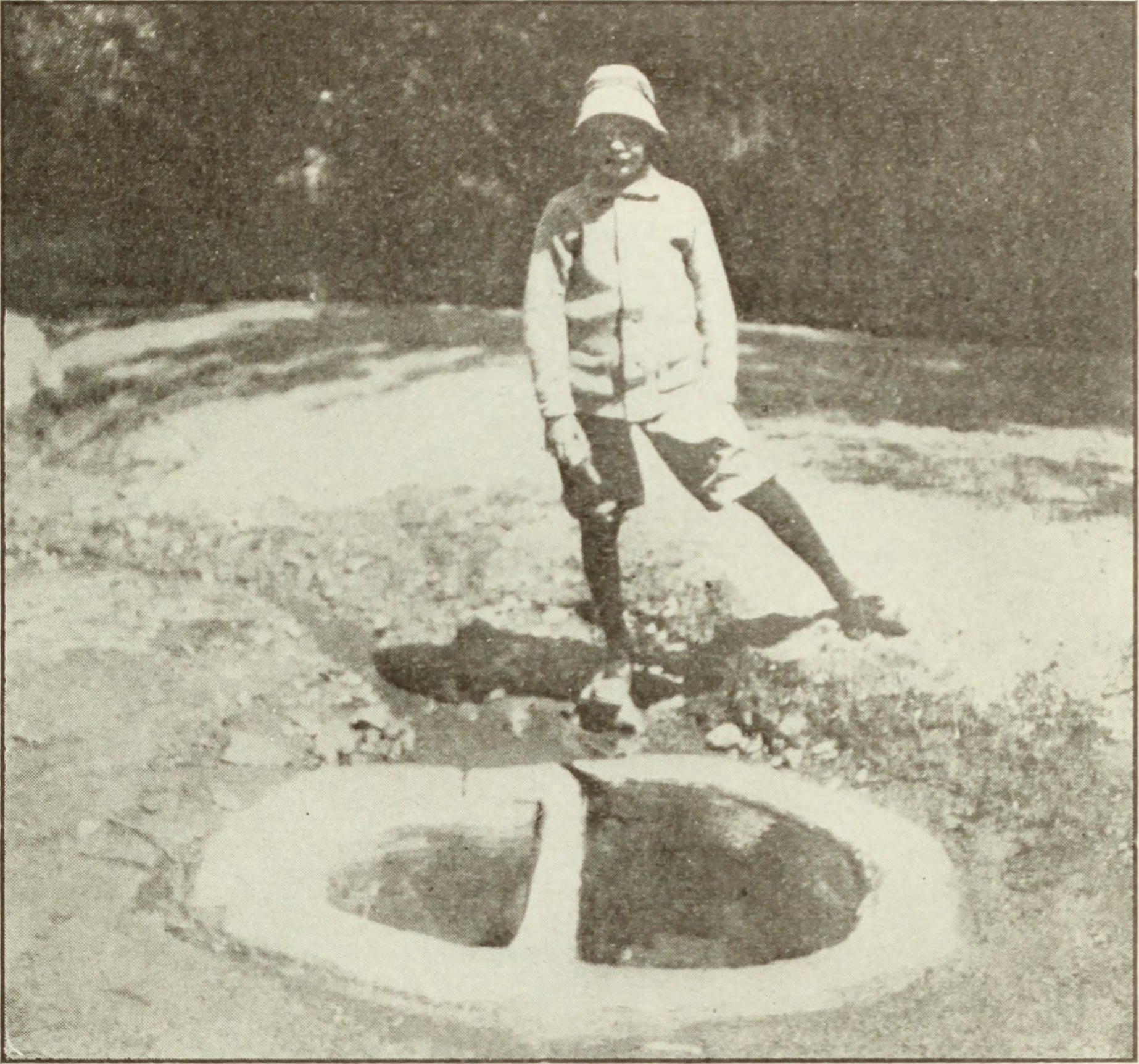
- Arsenic and Ems springs, at Highland Springs, Lake County, California

- Location in California Highland Springs (the United States)
- Coordinates: 38°56′14″N 122°54′25″W
- Country: United States
- State: California
- County: Lake County
- Elevation: 1,483 ft (452 m)

Highland Springs (formerly Highland) is a set of springs which was turned into a resort in the 19th century in Lake County, California. The resort grew to be able to accommodate 200 people, attracted by the curative powers of the mineral waters and the lovely mountain scenery. In the 1920s its popularity waned, the hotel was partly burned, and it passed through various hands before the county claimed eminent domain, bought the property, and flooded it with the Highland Springs Reservoir. The reservoir is surrounded by the Highland Springs Recreation Area, managed by the county.

== Location ==
The Highland Springs are 5 miles (8.0 km) southwest of Kelseyville. They are in the edge of the mountains that border the flat Big Valley area to the west of Clear Lake (California). It is at an elevation of 1483 feet (452 m). OpenStreetMap shows the Old Toll Road branching off to the southeast from the Lakeport–Hopland Road (CA175) just east of Hopland. The road turns east, and when it passes from Mendocino County to Lake County it changes name to Highland Springs Road. It continues east through Highland Springs, then turns north past Highland Springs Reservoir to join CA29 / CA175 just east of Lampson Field and south of Lakeport.

An 1890 guide said the springs could be reached by the Southern Pacific Railroad to Calistoga, then by stage, or by the Northern Pacific Railroad to Cloverdale, then by stage. The stage, whether from Calistoga or from Cloverdale, was exceedingly picturesque, along winding roads through rugged country. Accounts from the early 20th century before CA175 had been built place Highland Springs on the road between Hopland and Kelseyville. The resort was 14 miles (23 km) east of Pieta on the main road to Lakeport.

== Springs ==
As of 1910, there were 11 springs. Seltzer Spring emerged at the base of a gentle slope about 160 yards (150 m) southeast of the hotel. The others springs issued west to northwest of the hotel in a distance of about 226 yards (207 m) along the western bank of the creek. All the springs were carbonated, and their basins stained by iron. Small amounts of lime carbonate were deposited at several places. South of the springs, along the road westward from the hotel, a deposit of lime carbonate several feet thick was exposed for 50 yards (46 m) or more. The springs issue mainly from crushed sandstone and shale. They are considered to be thermal carbonated springs, but are mainly known for their carbonated waters.

Seltzer Spring was protected by a latticed spring house and rose in a cemented basin. The temperature of the water was 59 °F (15 °C) and its discharge was about 1 US gallon (3.8 L; 0.83 imp gal) per minute. The water was strongly carbonated and it deposited considerable iron.

Neptune Spring, the southernmost of those along the creek, was about 100 yards (91 m) west of the hotel. The spring rose in a small drinking pool in the center of an oval cemented basin, several feet across, on a gentle slope at the base of a low bank. The water had a temperature of 66 °F (19 °C). Its flow was slight, but it was piped to a small bathing plunge a few yards away.

Diana Spring and Magnesia Spring rose in cemented basins a few yards apart at the base of a small bank 50 or 60 yards (46 or 55 m) northward and nearer the creek. Water from Diana supplied a small bathing plunge near by, whereas Magnesia was used only for drinking. The recorded temperatures of these springs were 80 °F (27 °C) and 68 °F (20 °C), and their flows were, respectively, about 4 US gallons (15 L; 3.3 imp gal) and 1/4 US gallon (0.95 L; 0.21 imp gal) per minute.

From about 30 to nearly 55 yards beyond the Magnesia Spring much water rose beneath a platform. This water supplied an adjacent bathhouse and was also piped across the creek to a swimming plunge. Temperatures of 72 to 82 °F (22 to 28 °C) were recorded at different points beneath the platform. The discharge was about 10 US gallons (38 L; 8.3 imp gal) per minute. There were two small pools with slight overflow along the creek bank a few yards north of the bathhouse and an iron-stained seepage area extended about 10 yards (9.1 m) along the creek edge. Beyond this area there was a small board-curbed pool which discharged about 2 US gallons (7.6 L; 1.7 imp gal) a minute of water at 73 °F (23 °C) in temperature. Gas bubbles up through the water of the creek at several places.

10 yards (9.1 m) beyond, at the northern end of the line of springs, Arsenic and Dutch springs rose in separate compartments of a circular, cemented basin near the creek edge. Their recorded temperatures were, respectively, 68 °F (20 °C) and 72 °F (22 °C). Arsenic Spring yielded approximately 1/2 US gallon (1.9 L; 0.42 imp gal) per minute and Dutch Spring perhaps twice as much. The Dutch (or Ems) is crystal clear and the Arsenic is milky.

== History ==
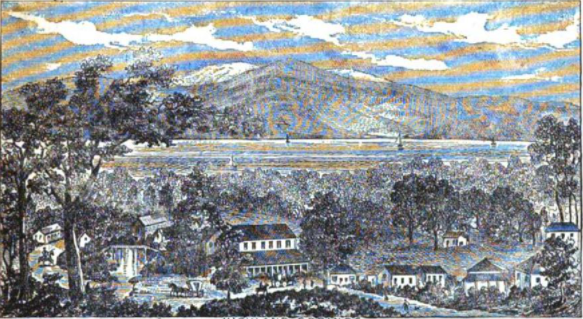
Highland Springs Sanitarium from an 1885 advertisement

Highland Springs began as a resort in the 1870s. The first Highland Springs post office opened in 1875 and closed in 1880. The Highland post office opened in 1880, changed its name to Highland Springs in 1884, and closed in 1921. An 1885 advertisement by Dr. C.M. Bates, Sole Proprietor, described Highland Springs Sanitarium as the Switzerland of America, and said it was "sheltered from the chilling coast winds and fogs by mountains 1,600 feet in height, which, for grandeur and beauty of scenery, are unsurpassed on the Pacific Coast, while the beneficial effects of its mineral waters are equal to any in the United States or Europe. An 1890 guide said,

At Highland's we find a commodious hotel and many elegant cottages built with a view to health and beauty combined. There is also a livery stable at which saddle horses and carriages may be procured for the drives to Lakeport, Soda Bay, Kelseyville, etc. A large pure mountain stream runs past the hotel, which is well supplied with fish. The climate is mild and dry, and the air is pure and filled with ozone and scents from the fragrant woods and plants which abound on the grounds. The altitude is about 1,700 feet, and it is claimed to be an excellent place for consumptives.

Mineral springs are usually abundant in Lake County, and some of them are of considerable therapeutic value. At Highland's there are some twenty springs, all of which I examined in 1888....

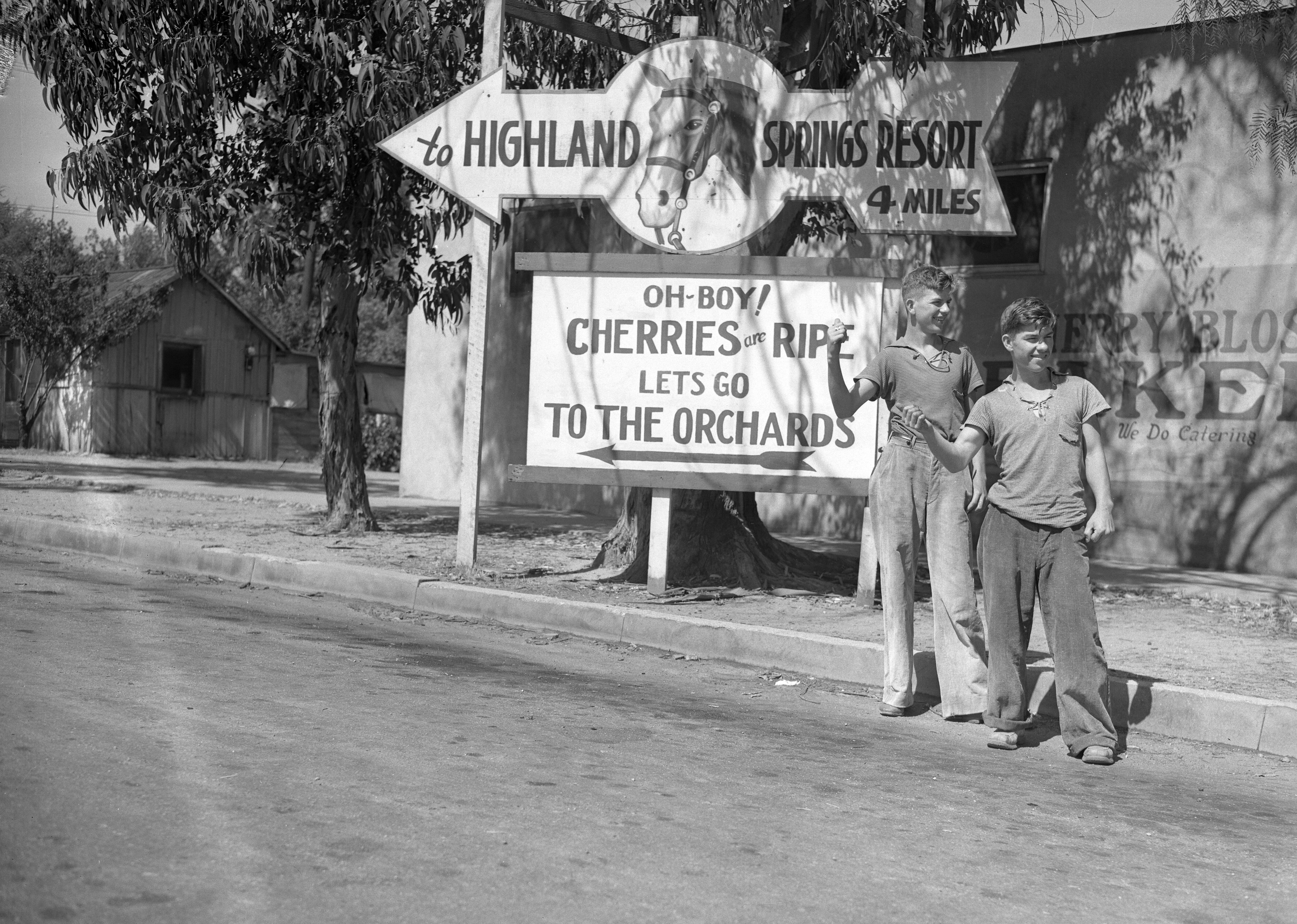
Two WPA workers hitchhiking besides Highland Springs Resort and cherry orchards billboard, circa 1939

As of 1910 a large frame hotel and half a dozen cottages situated in a small flat along the course of Adobe Creek provided accommodations for 200 guests. In 1914 the owners were Craig & Stephons, Inc., of Woodland. The resort could accommodate 315 guests, and had a resident physician during the summer season. 2,300 acres (930 ha) were being maintained as a fishing and hunting preserve. The water was not bottled for sale.

The resort's mineral waters became less popular in the 1920s. Part of the hotel burned, and the property was sold to Neal Woods, who planned to open a casino on the property. It passed to a sheep rancher, and then to a physician who converted the remains of the hotel into his family home. In the 1960s Lake County bought the property under eminent domain, dammed Highland Creek and Adobe Creek, and flooded the resort property with the Highland Springs Reservoir.

As of 2021 the 2,500 acres (1,000 ha) Highland Springs Recreation Area was managed by the County of Lake Watershed Protection District. It contained Highland Springs Reservoir and Adobe Reservoir. Vegetation included open range or scrub and oak woodland. The steeper hillsides were mostly open chaparral. Visitors could engage in hiking, horseback riding, mountain biking, disc golf, paddling, fishing, hunting, picnicking and swimming. Highland Springs Disc Golf Course was established in 1980 between the hamlet and the reservoir. The reservoir is stocked with warm water fish such as largemouth bass, sunfish, bluegill, catfish and bullhead.

== Sources ==
- Anderson, Winslow (1890), Mineral Springs and Health Resorts of California: With a Complete Chemical Analysis of Every Important Mineral Water in the World, Bancroft Company
- Durham, David L. (1998). California's Geographic Names: A Gazetteer of Historic and Modern Names of the State. Clovis, California: Word Dancer Press. p. 76. ISBN 1-884995-14-4.
- Elliott, William W. (1885), Lake County, Cal., Illustrated and Described: Showing Its Advantages for Homes, W.W. Elliott
- Freeman, Aidan (11 June 2018), "Highland Springs", Record-Bee, MediaNews Group
- Hamilton, Fletcher (July 1915), "Report of State Mineralogist, 1913-1914", Appendix to the Journals of the Senate and Assembly of the forty-second session of the Legislature of the State of California, vol. VII
- "Highland Springs", Geographic Names Information System, United States Geological Survey, United States Department of the Interior
- Highland Springs Recreation Area, KRT Konocti Regional Trails
- Highland Springs Reservoir, PDGA Professional Disc Golf Association
- "Node: Highland Springs (141045643)", OpenStreetMap
- Stienstra, Tom (2012). Moon California Fishing: The Complete Guide to Fishing on Lakes, Streams, Rivers, and the Coast. Avalon Publishing. p. 702. ISBN 978-1612383101.
- Waring, Gerald Ashley (1915). Springs of California. U.S. Geological Survey Water Supply Paper. Vol. 338. U.S. Government Printing Office. doi:10.3133/wsp338.
