= South Vermillion High School =

School in Clinton, Indiana, United States

Location
- 770 West Wildcat Drive; Clinton, Vermillion County, Indiana 47842; United States; 39.6891°N 87.4139°W

Information
- Former names: Blanton, Clinton, Dana, Hillsdale, Saint Bernice
- Type: Public high school
- Motto: Once a Wildcat, Always a Wildcat
- Established: 1977
- School district: South Vermillion Community School Corporation
- Superintendent: Micah Williams
- Principal: Kara Skinner
- Faculty: 45.83 (FTE)
- Grades: 9–12
- Enrollment: 468 (2023-24)
- Student to teacher ratio: 10.21
- Color
- Song: Go you South Vermillion Wildcats
- Athletics: IHSAA Class 3A
- Athletics conference: Wabash River
- Mascot: The Wildcat
- Team name: Wildcats
- Rivals: North Vermillion, Rockville, Northview, Sullivan, West; Vigo
- Newspaper: The Wildcat
- Yearbook: Old Gold and Black
- Feeder schools: South Vermillion Middle School
- Formed from: Clinton
- Gym capacity: 2,900
- Brent Anderson Stadium capacity: 7,000
- Website: South Vermillion High School

South Vermillion High School is a public high school in Clinton, Indiana serving students in grades 9 through 12. It was created in 1977 as the building replaced Clinton High School. As of 2017, the school has an enrollment of approximately 546 students.

== Governance ==
South Vermillion is one of two high schools in Vermillion County (the other being North Vermillion High School in Cayuga). South Vermillion High School is also the only secondary institution under the administration of the South Vermillion School Corporation. The school district includes the municipalities of Clinton, Dana, Fairview Park, and Universal, and the census-designated places of Blanford and St. Bernice.

== Campus ==
The school is located on the north side of Clinton. The school's football field was named after former coach, Brent Anderson, on October 4, 2013. Its softball and baseball field is located next to the stadium. The Gym has a capacity of 2,900.

== Sport and extracurricular activities ==
South Vermillion participates in sports under IHSAA regulations and in IHSAA state rankings and tournaments. It is a member of the Wabash River Conference.

=== Basketball ===
The South Vermillion Wildcats have won (1) Sectional 1986.

==== Battle of the Back-Roads ====
The Battle of the Back-Roads game is played annually between the Riverton Parke Panthers and the Wildcats, the winner receiving a large gold basketball on a square wooden base. On February 15, 2013, the inaugural battle of the Back-Roads trophy was won by the Wildcats, beating Riverton Parke 73–55. The trophy series is South Vermillion 3–1 Riverton Parke.

=== American Football - South Vermillion Wildcats ===
The school is represented by the South Vermillion Wildcat football team in the 2A division of IHSAA football. Home games are played at Brent Anderson Memorial Stadium on the campus of the school. The Wildcats compete in the Wabash River Conference. Prior to realignment in 2016, South Vermillion was part of the Western Indiana Conference but moved to the WRC in 2016 due to travel costs.

The Wildcats have registered 7 winning seasons in their history, with 2 of those seasons resulting in eight victories or more, and 12 seasons resulting in at least five wins. The team have won 2 conference championships in their history.

==== Trophy games ====
===== Bronze Helmet game =====
The Bronze Helmet game is played annually between the Sullivan Golden Arrows and the Wildcats. The winner has been awarded the Bronze Helmet since 1946.

===== Coal Bucket game =====
The Coal Bucket game is played annually between the Northview Knights and the Wildcats, and the winner receives the old coal bucket. Originally started between the Clinton Wildcats and the Brazil Red Devils, the game has continued after Brazil consolidated into Northview. The winner has received the same coal bucket as a trophy for the game since 1951.

===== Milk Jug game =====
The Milk Jug game is played annually between the Riverton Parke Panthers and the Wildcats, and the winner receives the Milk Jug. The Milk Jug game started in 1993, with Riverton Park taking the Trophy 22–6. The game resumed after the Wildcats re-entered the Wabash River Conference in 2016.

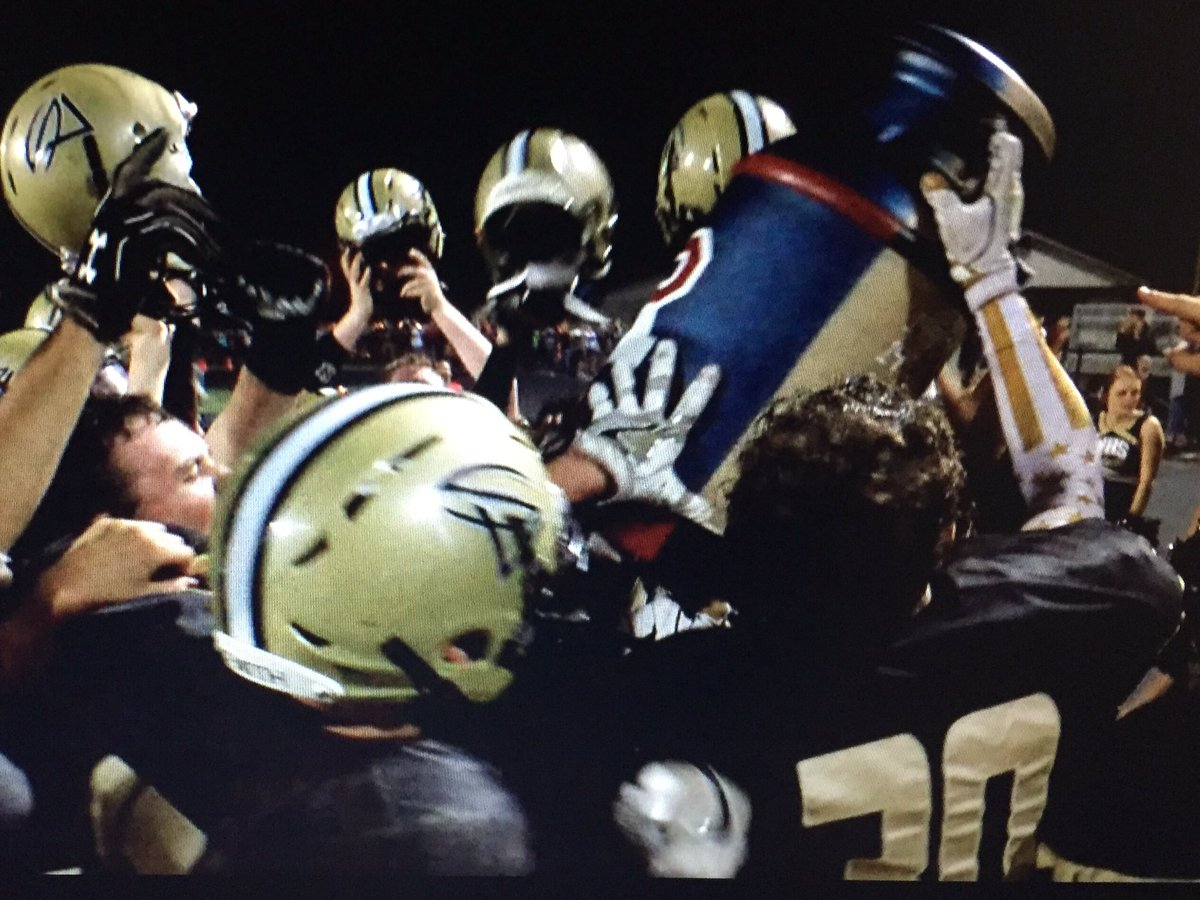
South Vermillion Wins 2016 Milk Jug Game

- 1993 Riverton Parke 22–6
- 1994 Riverton Parke 27–7
- 1995 South Vermillion 13–10
- 1996 Riverton Parke 42–13
- 1997 South Vermillion 21–20
- 1998 South Vermillion 52–7
- 2016 South Vermillion 48–20
- 2017 South Vermillion 31–6
- 2018 South Vermillion 28–0
- 2019 South Vermillion 35–8
- 2020 South Vermillion 54–0
- 2021 No Game COVID-19
- 2022 South Vermillion 38–0
- 2023 South Vermillion 49–7

==== Head coaches ====
South Vermillion Wildcats Head Coaches

Name	Seasons	Record
Brent Anderson	1977–1984	33–45
TBD	1985–1989	10–35
TBD	1990–1993	11–26
Mike Stewart	1994	1–8
Phil Morris	1995	3–6
Tim Weeks	1996–1998	11–18
Rene Foli	1999–2003	15–25
Brian Gilman	2004–2007	8–32
Ron Whiteman	2008–2010	15–17
Chuck Sorrell	2011–2013	4–26
Will Porter	2014–2016	9–22
Greg Barrett	2017–2025	TBD
Corey Miller	2025–present

==== Record vs. rivals ====
Team	Record	Percentage	Streak	First Meeting	Last Meeting
North Vermillion	19–22	.463	WIN 3	1981	2022
Northview / Brazil	5–28	.152	Loss 2	1977	2015
Sullivan	8–24	.250	Loss 12	1977	2022
West Vigo	10–17	3.70	WIN 1	1977	2022
Park Heritage/Rockville^{1}	16–28	.363	WIN 1	1978	2022
Overall Record			58–119

1. Name Changed due to Rockville and Turkey Run consolidation.

==== Conference championships ====
South Vermillion has won or shared a conference championship on 3 occasions, including 2 Western Indiana Conference titles and most recently the 2017 Wabash River Conference Title.

Season	Coach	Title	Record	Conf. Record
1979	Brent Anderson	Western Indiana	5–4	3–1
1980	Brent Anderson	Western Indiana	6–4	3–0
2017	Greg Barrett	Wabash River	7–3	7–1
2020	Greg Barrett	Wabash River	7–2	6–0

==== Team records ====
South Vermillion Wildcats Football Records

Season	Record
1977	3–7
1978	2–8
1979	5–5
1980	6–4
1981	6–4
1982	6–3
1983	2–8
1984	1–9
1985	2–7
1986	2–7
1987	3–6
1988	2–7
1989	2–7

Season	Record
1990	4–6
1991	0–9
1992	5–4
1993	2–7
1994	1–8
1995	3–6
1996	1–8
1997	5–5
1998	5–5
1999	5–5
2000	5–5
2001	8–3
2002	1–9

Season	Record
2003	2–8
2004	3–8
2005	0–10
2006	2–8
2007	2–8
2008	6–5
2009	8–2
2010	0–10
2011	0–10
2012	2–8
2013	2–8
2014	4–7
2015	3–7

Season	Record
2016	2–8
2017	7–3
2018	3–7
2019	7–5
2020	7–2
2021	4–6
2022	5–1
2023
2024
2025
2026	3-7
2027
2028

Season	Record
2029
2030
2031
2032
2033
2034
2035
2036
Total	157–292

==== All-State players ====
A total of 8 Wildcats have been recognized as All-State by various media selectors.

South Vermillion All-State Players

Season	Name	Pos.
1992	J.D. Murdock	OT
1998	Jason Hoke	RB
1998	Jacob Weber	WE

Season	Name	Pos.
2009	Dan Rowe	OL
2017	Jacob Handley	WR
2019	Cam Meyer	DE

Season	Name	Pos.
2020	Joey Shew	TE
2020	Kadin McMahan	DL

Fall

- Boys Cross Country
- Girls Cross Country
- Football
- Girls Golf
- Boys Soccer
- Girls Soccer
- Boys Tennis
- Volleyball

Winter

- Boys Basketball
- Girls Basketball
- Boys Swimming
- Girls Swimming
- Wrestling

Spring

- Baseball
- Boys Golf
- Softball
- Girls Tennis
- Boys Track and Field
- Girls Track and Field

There are also the club sports (non-IHSAA) of cheerleading, dance and boys and girls bowling.

=== Quizzes ===
The school has a spell bowl team, a math bowl team, and many other academic teams. Their spell bowl team has been to state on several occasions most recently in the 2015–16 school year. Their Quiz Bowl won the final W.I.C competition on February 2, 2016.

=== Theatre ===
Dating back to 1980, the Theatre program has been going strong, staging plays and musicals. Shows staged include The Sound of Music, Tarzan The Musical, Shrek The Musical, MAMMA MIA!, Into The Woods, Beauty And The Beast, Charlie and The Chocolate Factory The Musical, Frozen, All Together Now!, and My Fair Lady.

=== Marching Band ===
The school has a marching band program. They have done shows such as A New Dawn, The Station, Groovitude, Thor's Hammer, The Beatles, and Confined in this Mad World.

== Former schools ==
School	Location	Mascot	Colors	Year Started	Year closed	
Blanford	Blanford	Bears		1923	1928	Consolidated into Clinton
Clinton	Clinton	Wildcats		1885	1977	New building/Name changed to South Vermillion
Dana	Dana	Aggies		1925	1961	Consolidated into Clinton
Hillsdale	Hillsdale	Hilltoppers		1916	1961	Consolidated into Clinton
Saint Bernice	Saint Bernice	Hornets		1928	1961	Consolidated into Clinton

== See also ==
- List of high schools in Indiana Western Indiana Conference
