= Wabash River Conference =

High school athletic conference in Indiana, United States

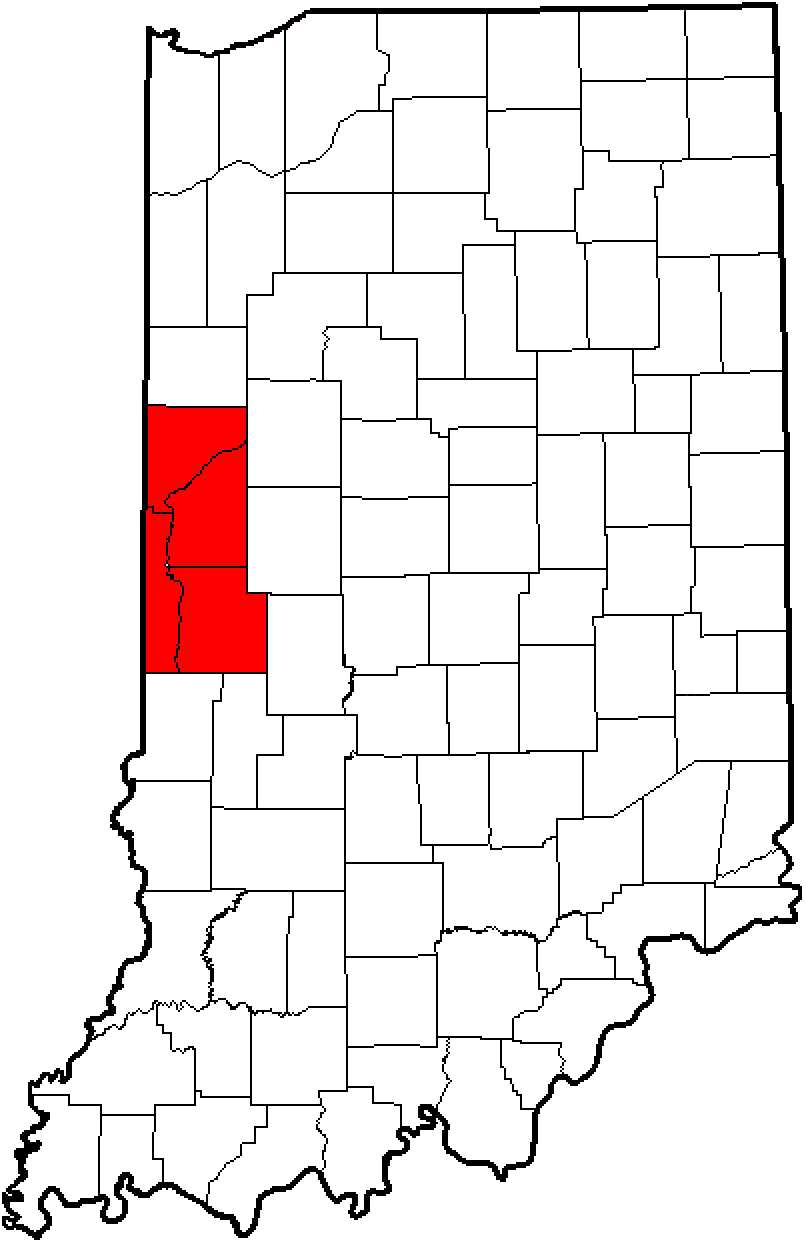
The Wabash Conference in Indiana

The Wabash River Conference is an eight-member Indiana High School Athletic Association (IHSAA)-sanctioned conference located within Fountain, Parke, Vermillion, and Warren Counties in West Central Indiana. All of the participating schools are either 1A, 2A, or 3A (South Vermillion) institutions in rural counties. The conference began in 1964 with nine schools who had outgrown their county conferences or had them fold, and has had that number stay relatively consistent since. The only change since was the consolidation of two members, Turkey Run and Rockville, into Parke Heritage High School in 2018 reducing the number of members to 8.

== Membership ==
School	Location	Mascot	Colors	Enrollment	IHSAA Class	County	Year Joined or Year Joining	Previous conference
Attica^{1}	Attica	Red Ramblers		170	1A	23; Fountain	1966	Hoosier
Covington^{2}	Covington	Trojans		294	2A	23; Fountain	1964	Fountain County
Fountain; Central	Veedersburg	Mustangs		275	1A	23; Fountain	1965	none (new school)
North; Vermillion	Cayuga	Falcons		213	1A	83; Vermillion	1964	none (new school)
Parke Heritage	Rockville	Wolves		368	2A	61; Parke	2018	none (new school)
Riverton; Parke	Montezuma	Panthers		311	2A	61; Parke	1986	none (new school)
Seeger^{3}	West Lebanon	Patriots		387	2A	86; Warren	1964	Warren County
South Vermillion^{4}	Clinton	Wildcats		510	3A	83; Vermillion	1982; 2016	Western Indiana; Western Indiana

1. Played concurrently in the WRC and HAC 1966–71.
2. Played concurrently in the WRC and FCAA 1964–65.
3. Played concurrently in the WRC and WCC 1964–73.
4. Played in WIC 1999–2015.

=== Former members ===
School	Location	Mascot	Colors	County	Year joined	Previous conference	Year left	Conference joined
Coal Creek Central	New Richmond	Bearcats		54; Montgomery	1964	Montgomery County	1971	none (consolidated into North Montgomery)
Ladoga	Ladoga	Canners		54; Montgomery	1964	Big 4	1971	none (consolidated into Southmont)
New Market	New Market	Purple Flyers		54; Montgomery	1964	Big 4	1971	none (consolidated into Southmont)
Rockville	Rockville	Rox		61; Parke	1964	Parke County	2018	none (consolidated into Parke Heritage)
Turkey; Run	Marshall	Warriors		61; Parke	1964	Parke County	2018	none (consolidated into Parke Heritage)
Veedersburg^{1}	Veedersburg	Green Devils		23; Fountain	1964	Fountain County	1965	none (consolidated into Fountain Central)
North; Montgomery	Linden	Chargers		54; Montgomery	1971	none (new school)	1974	Sagamore
Southmont	New Market	Mounties		54; Montgomery	1971	none (new school)	1985	Sagamore

1. Played concurrently in the WRC and FCAA 1964–65.

== Facilities ==
School	Football Stadium	Capacity	Basketball arena	Capacity
Attica	Lewis Bruce Field	800	Lambert Memorial Gym	2,360
Covington	Trojan Complex	1,000	Covington Gym	2,100
Fountain; Central	Mustang Stadium	1,000	Mustang Gym	2,500
North; Vermillion	Gibson Field	2,000	Kirk Gentrup Memorial Gymnasium	2,200
South Vermillion	Brent Anderson Memorial Stadium	7,000	South Vermillion Arena	3,500
Parke Heritage^{1}	Rock Fields	780	Wolf Den	257
Riverton; Parke	Ciolli Field	800	Panther Arena	1,837
Seeger	Patriot Field	1,000	Williamsport Gym	2,500

1. Facilities may be renamed after consolidation.

== Football Champions ==
Split championships are denoted with asterisks.

Titles	School	Years
14	Fountain Central	1965, 1966, 1975, 1976, 1979, 1980, 1983, 1996, 1997*, 2009, 2010, 2011, 2016*, 2017*
13	North Vermillion	1967, 1986*, 1987, 1989*, 1992, 1993, 2012, 2013, 2014, 2015, 2016*, 2018, 2019
12	Seeger	1988*, 1989*, 1994, 1995*, 1997*, 1998, 2001, 2002, 2003, 2004, 2005, 2006
8	Rockville^{1}	1968, 1984, 1988*, 1989*, 1991*, 1997*, 2007, 2008
7	Covington	1964, 1970*, 1972*, 1974*, 1985, 1986*, 1991*
7	Southmont^{1}	1971, 1972*, 1974*, 1977, 1978, 1981, 1982
3	Attica	1990, 1999, 2000
2	North Montgomery^{1}	1972*, 1973
2	Turkey Run^{1}	1970*, 1995*
1	Coal Creek Central^{1}	1969
3	South Vermillion	2017*, 2024 2025
0	Ladoga^{1}	
0	New Market^{1}	
1	Parke Heritage	2021
0	Riverton-Parke	
0	Veedersburg^{1}	

1. No longer plays in WRC.
2. *Shared Title

== State championships ==
=== Attica (1) ===
- 2001 Boys Basketball (A)

=== Fountain Central (1) ===
- 1983 Boys Football (A)

=== North Vermillion (2) ===
- 2002 Girls Basketball (A)
- 2014 Boys Football (A)

=== Riverton Parke (1) ===
- 2010 Girls Softball (A)

=== Seeger (1) ===
- 2004 Boys Football (A)

=== South Vermillion (0) ===
- N/A

=== Parke Heritage (0) ===
• N/A

== Resources ==
- IHSAA Conferences
- IHSAA Directory
