= Chike Okeafor =

American football player (born 1976)

No. 91, 56
- Position: Linebacker

Personal information
- Born: March 27, 1976 (age 50); Grand Rapids, Michigan, U.S.
- Listed height: 6 ft 5 in (1.96 m)
- Listed weight: 256 lb (116 kg)

Career information
- College: Purdue
- NFL draft: 1999: 3rd round, 89th overall pick

Career history
- San Francisco 49ers (1999–2002); Seattle Seahawks (2003–2004); Arizona Cardinals (2005–2009)

Awards and highlights
- Second-team All-Big Ten (1996)

Career NFL statistics
- Total tackles: 448
- Sacks: 53
- Forced fumbles: 15
- Fumble recoveries: 2
- Interceptions: 2
- Stats at Pro Football Reference

Chikezie Russell Okeafor // (/ˈtʃiːkeɪ ˈoʊkəfər/; born March 27, 1976) is an American former professional football player. During his National Football League (NFL) career from 1999 to 2009, he played defensive end and linebacker for the San Francisco 49ers, the Seattle Seahawks, and the Arizona Cardinals.

== Background ==
Okeafor was born in Grand Rapids, Michigan in 1976. His father, of Igbo ethnicity, had come to America in the wake of the Nigerian Civil War. His parents pursued advanced academic training at universities in Michigan and Ohio, before his father returned to Nigeria in 1983 and Chike and his sisters were raised by his mother in the Midwest.

After moving to West Lafayette, Indiana, Okeafor played High School Football at West Lafayette Junior-Senior High School. He was a finalist for the Indiana Mr. Football Award, and co-captained his team to the 1993 state championship in his senior year.

Okeafor stayed in West Lafayette to play college football at Purdue University, where he also studied engineering. He was a two-time second-team All-Big Ten selection and two-time nominee for the Butkus Award given to college football's top linebacker. Okeafor was suspended from the team for the 1997 season by new Purdue coach Joe Tiller for "conduct detrimental to the team", and then converted from linebacker to defensive end for his senior year.

== NFL career ==
=== San Francisco 49ers ===
In the 1999 NFL Draft, Okeafor was selected in the third round 89th overall by the San Francisco 49ers and signed a four-year contract. Playing defensive end and on special teams, he became a starter in 2001, and started all 16 games in 2002. During his tenure with the 49ers he recorded 119 tackles, 11.5 sacks and five passes defended.

=== Seattle Seahawks ===
Okeafor signed with the Seattle Seahawks as an unrestricted free agent and played with them in the 2003 and 2004 seasons. He led the team in sacks both seasons, recording 100 tackles, 16.5 sacks, 1 pass defended and one interception which he returned 18 yards.

=== Arizona Cardinals ===
Okeafor signed a five-year contract with the Arizona Cardinals in 2005. He initially played defensive end for Arizona in the 4-3 scheme of head coach Dennis Green. Once Green was fired, new head coach Ken Whisenhunt introduced a Pittsburgh-style 3-4 scheme that would ultimately change Okeafor's position to Outside Linebacker. The Cardinals won their division in 2008 and 2009, including a losing effort in Super Bowl XLIII in which Okeafor contributed 6 solo tackles. He missed the entire 2007 season with a biceps injury, but in four active years as a Cardinal recorded 210 tackles, 25 sacks, 12 passes defended and one interception which he returned 39 yards.

In 2010, Okeafor became a free agent.

== Personal ==
During his football career, Okeafor became known for his eccentric activities, including meditation, yoga, and practicing Wing Chun. He favored natural foods and herbal remedies, slept on an electrically grounded bed, and wore a medallion to ward off chaotic energy.
