= Clinton High School (Indiana) =

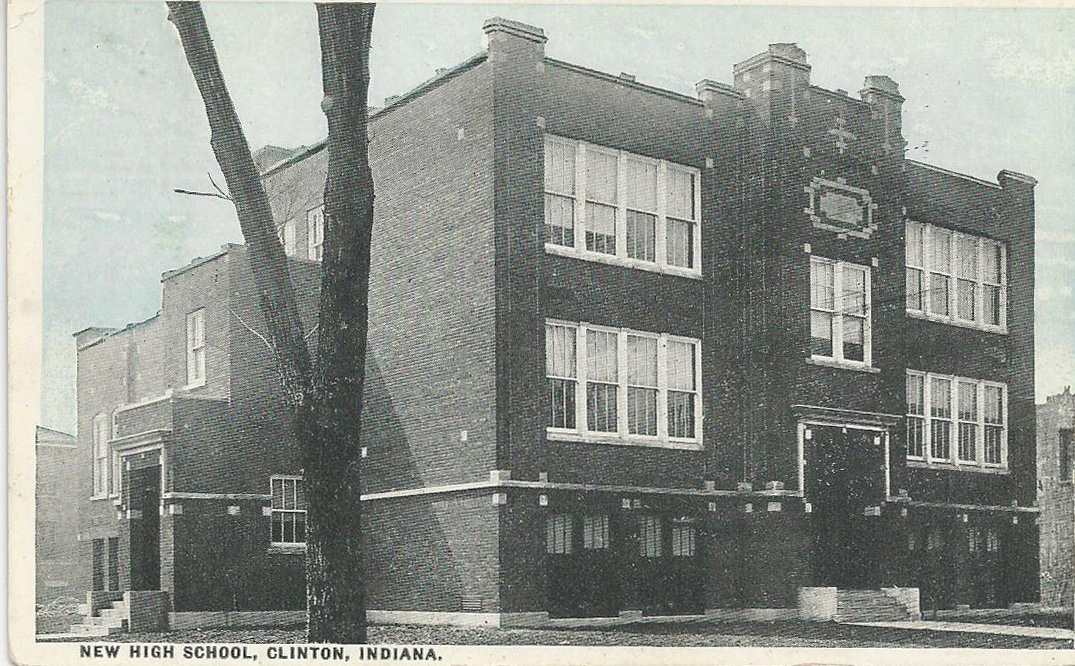

Location
- 301 Blackman St; Clinton, Indiana 47842; United States; 39.658565°N 87.400684°W

Information
- Established: 1886
- Closed: 1977
- Grades: 7–12
- Enrollment: over 800 when moved into South Vermillion
- Color
- Athletics: IHSAA
- Athletics conference: Western Indiana
- Mascot: Wildcat
- Team name: Wildcats
- Newspaper: The Annual
- Yearbook: Old Gold and Black
- State Championships: 1920 1924 1928 1932 1933

Clinton High School was a public school in Clinton serving students in grades 7 through 12. It was created in 1886 and then from the consolidation in 1961 of former high schools in southern Vermillion County, Indiana, Dana High School, Hillsdale High School, St. Bernice High School, and Blanford High School. Then in 1977 Clinton was replaced by a new building and renamed South Vermilion High School

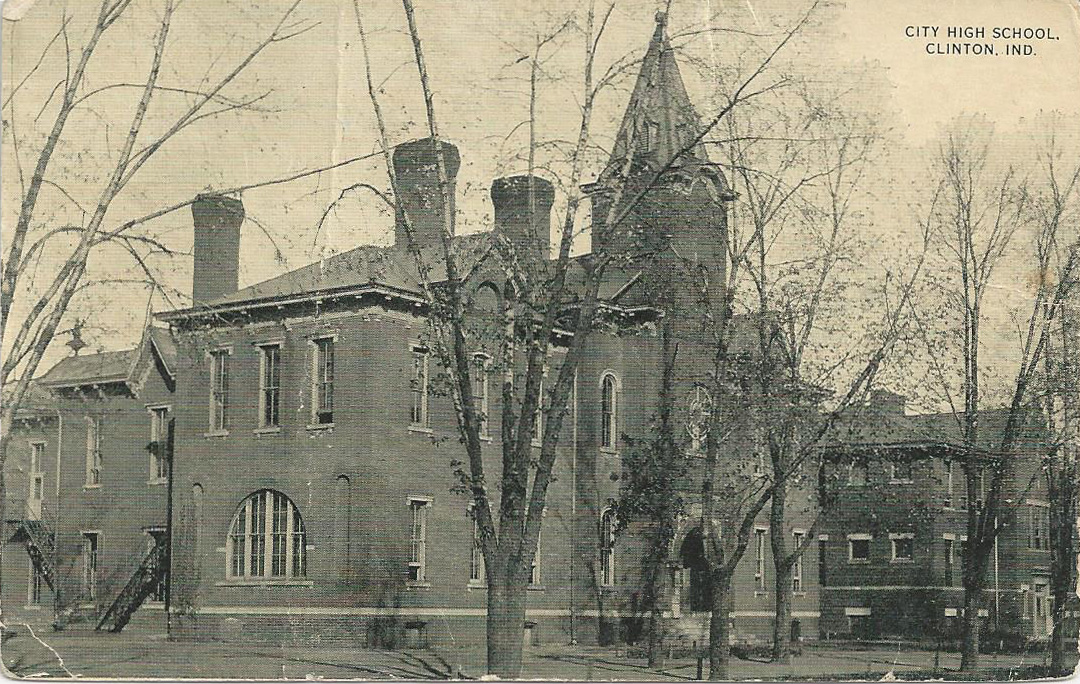
Old Clinton High School Building 1886–1919

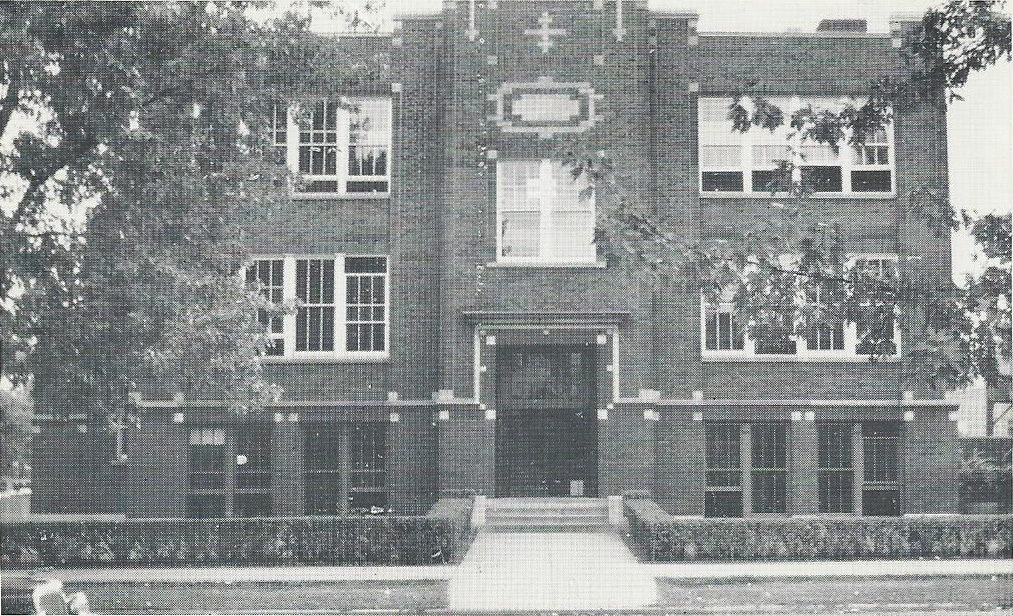
Clinton Junior High School

== Campus ==
The school was located in the center of Clinton just off Main St in the 300 Block of Blackman St. Their football field and baseball field was located at SportLand Park on the south west side of Clinton.

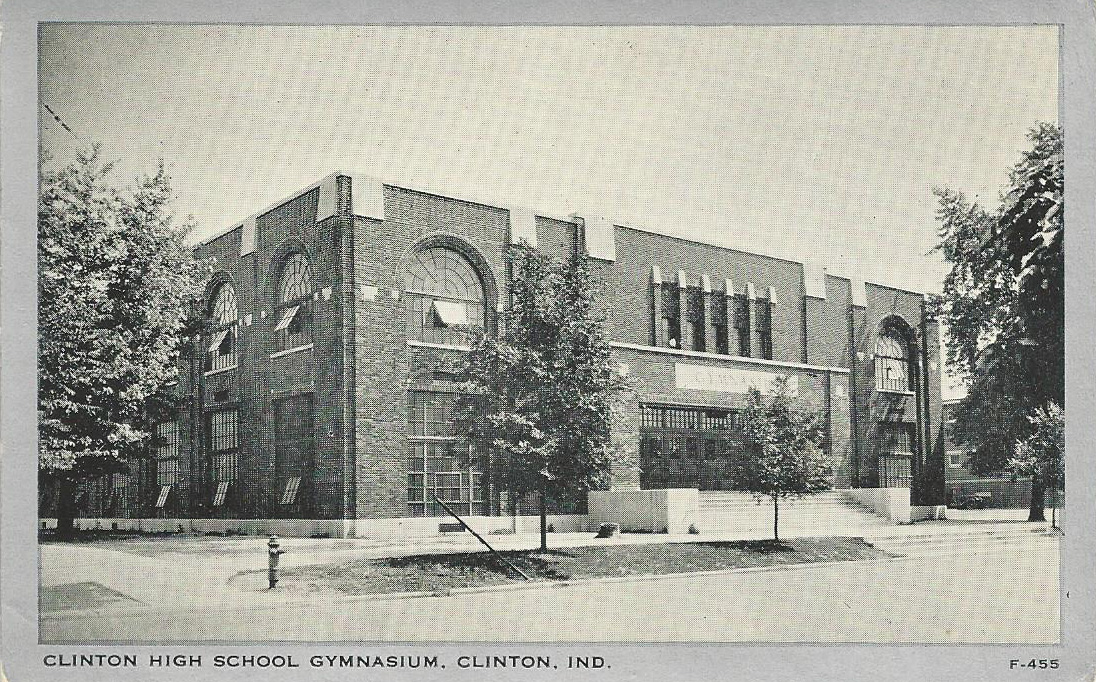
Gymnasium Built 1937

== Consolidation ==
School	Location	Mascot	Colors	Year Started	Year closed	
Blanford	Blanford	Bears		1923	1928	Consolidated into Clinton
Dana	Dana	Aggies		1925	1961	Consolidated into Clinton
Hillsdale	Hillsdale	Hilltoppers		1916	1961	Consolidated into Clinton
Saint Bernice	Saint Bernice	Hornets		1928	1961	Consolidated into Clinton

== Athletics ==
=== Basketball ===
Clinton has an all-time record of (25) sectional Championships 1912, 1913, 1914, 1916, 1925, 1928, 1930, 1931, 1932, 1933, 1934, 1935, 1938, 1939, 1942, 1943, 1945, 1946, 1947, 1949, 1950, 1955, 1956, 1961, 1968. The Clinton Wildcats made it to the IHSAA Sweet Sixteen (8) times in its history and the Elite Eight (2) times in its history

Year	Site
1912	Terre Haute
1913	Terre Haute
1914	Terre Haute
1916	Terre Haute
1925	Clinton
1928	Clinton
1930	Clinton
1931	Clinton
1932	Clinton
1933	Clinton
1934	Clinton
1935	Newport
1938	Marshall
1939	Clinton
1942	Clinton
1943	Clinton
1945	Marshall
1946	Clinton
1947	Clinton
1949	Clinton
1950	Clinton
1955	Rockville
1956	Clinton
1961	Rockville
1968	Terre Haute

Clinton also has won (4) Regional Championships 1928, 1943, 1947, 1950.

Year	Site
1928	Greencastle
1943	Clinton
1947	Clinton
1950	Greencastle

=== Football ===
The Clinton Wildcat are mostly known for their football team that has won 5 Indiana Big School Football Champions in 1920, 1924, 1928, 1932, and 1933.

== Head coaches ==
Clinton Wildcats Head Coaches

Name	Seasons	Record
H. B. Allen	1916	0–0
Mark Lyday	1917–1918	0–1
Earl M. Morgan	1919–1921	17–6–1
Earl Pike	1922	4–3–2
Max Bullock	1923	3–5–2
Paul "Spike" Kelly	1924–1930	50–11–5
John Magnabosco	1931–1934	34–3–3
Ed Shaver	1935	6–5
Raymond "Tubby" Trobaugh	1936	4–4–1
Maurice E. "Babe" Frump	1937–1940	23–14–2

Name	Seasons	Record
William J. Coyer	1941–1942	14–5
N. E. Wernz	1943	5–2–1
B. Leland McCool	1944	7–1–1
Frank Welton	1945	3–5–1
Robert Burton	1946	2–6–1
George Bibich	1947	2–7
Arthur B. Haverstock	1948–1949	5–13–1
Thorval Mattax	1950–1952	21–6–3
Chester Sanders	1953–1954	10–8–2
Stewart "Red" Faught	1955–1956	9–11

Name	Seasons	Record
John Alfier	1957–1960	10–25–5
William S. Syvantek	1961–1964	13–13–4
Coach Deal	1962	2–8
Dick Schrier	1965	7–3
Jerry Chance	1966–1968	9–19–1
Rene Foli	1969–1971	10–17–3
Brent Anderson	1972–1976	28–21
Overall Record	1916–1977	298-222-39

== Team records ==
Clinton Wildcats Football Records

Season	Record
1916	0–0
1917	0–0
1918	0–1
1919	5–2
1920	6–2
1921	6–2–1
1922	4–3–2
1923	3–5–2
1924	8–1
1925	4–3–2
1926	5–3–1
1927	8–1
1928	10–0
1929	8–1–1

Season	Record
1930	7–2–1
1931	9–1–1
1932	9–1
1933	9–0–1
1934	7–1–1
1935	6–5
1936	4–4–1
1937	7–2–1
1938	5–4
1939	6–5
1940	5–3–1
1941	7–3
1942	7–2

Season	Record
1943	5–2–1
1944	7–1–1
1945	3–5–1
1946	2–6–1
1947	2–7
1948	2–6–1
1949	3–7
1950	5–4–1
1951	9–1
1952	7–1–2
1953	5–4–1
1954	5–4–1
1955	5–5

Season	Record
1956	4–6
1957	2–6–2
1958	4–6
1959	1–8–1
1960	3–5–2
1961	2–8
1962	2–8
1963	6–2–2
1964	5–3–2
1965	7–3
1966	2–7–1
1967	1–9
1968	6–3

Season	Record
1969	5–4–1
1970	5–4–1
1971	0–9–1
1972	3–7
1973	7–3
1974	10–0
1975	4–5
1976	4–6
Total	298–222–39

=== Conference championships ===
Clinton has won or shared a conference championship around nine occasions, including six Indiana High School Football Conference titles and three Western Indiana Conference titles.

Season	Coach	Title	Record	Conf. Record
1927	Paul "Spike" Kelly	IHSFC Champion	8–1	4–0
1928	Paul "Spike" Kelly	Wabash Valley Champion	10–0	4–0
1928	Paul "Spike" Kelly	IHSFC Champion	10–0	4–0
1929	Paul "Spike" Kelly	IHSFC Champion	8–1–1	4–0
1931	John Magnabosco	Wabash Valley Champion	9–1–1	4–0
1931	John Magnabosco	IHSFC Champion	9–1–1	4–0
1932	John Magnabosco	IHSFC Champion	9–1	4–0
1933	John Magnabosco	IHSFC Champion	9–0–1	5–0
1951	Thorval Mattax	Western Indiana	9–1	7–0
1952	Thorval Mattax	Western Indiana	7–1–2	6–1
1974	Brent Anderson	Western Indiana	10–0	6–0

=== State championships ===
Clinton has won or shared a State championship on five occasions, including three outright Indiana High School Football titles and two shared titles. In 1933 Clinton tied East Chicago Washington 6–6 in the arranged post-season North-South Mythical State Championship Game and was named Winner of Indianapolis Times & IHSAA ‘Most Outstanding Team in Indiana’

Season	Coach	Selector	Record	Conf. Record
1920	Earl M. Morgan	Heze Clark – Best Team In the State (Shared with Wabash)	6–2	4–0
1924	Paul "Spike" Kelly		8–1	4–0
1928	Paul "Spike" Kelly	Indianapolis Times – IHSAA – Dick Miller- "Most Outstanding Team"	10–0	4–0
1932	John Magnabosco	Indianapolis Times – IHSAA – Dick Miller- "Most Outstanding Team"	9–1	4–0
1933	John Magnabosco	Indianapolis Times – IHSAA – Dick Miller- "Most Outstanding Team"	9–0–1	4–0

== Record vs. rivals ==
Team	Record	Percentage	Streak	First Meeting	Last Meeting
Brazil	28–28–2	.500	WIN 1	1920	1976
Rockville	8–1–1	.800	WIN 2	1964	1973
Linton-Stockton	15–15–2	.500	Loss 8	1920	1973
Sullivan	27–27	.500	Loss 1	1920	1976
West Vigo	10–4–1	.667	WIN 4	1962	1976
Overall Record			88–75–6

=== All-State players ===
A total of 19 Wildcats have been recognized as All-State by various media selectors.

Clinton All-State Players

Season	Name	Pos.
1920	Kelse	LT
1921	Leland York	HB
1924	Grahm	HB
1924	John Magnabosco	RG
1925	John Magnabosco	FB
1927	Antoninni	OL
1928	Cogan	HB

Season	Name	Pos.
1928	Marsh	QB
1929	Malone	RG
1930	Ettore Antonini	LE
1931	Chris Dal Sasso	DL
1932	Chris Dal Sasso	DL
1933	Fred Vanzo	HB
1934	William Thompson	DL

Season	Name	Pos.
1936	Robert Phillips	DL
1938	Tony Berto	FB
1941	Mike Rodich	RG
1942	Jack Curry	OL
1944	Jack Gilman	FB
1952	Gene Dick	DB
1974	John Riggins	OL

== Notable alumni ==
- Emil Bildilli – Major League Baseball pitcher (1937–1941)
- Chris Dal Dasso 1933 – All-State Tackle, Played at IU 1934–1936; team captain 1936, Athletic Director at Indiana University
- Lawrence J. Giacoletto 1934 – Known for his work in the field of semi-conductor circuit technology.
- Fred Vanzo 1934 – professional American football player who played running back for four seasons for the Detroit Lions and Chicago Cardinals.
- John Magnabosco 1923 – Head Coach Ball State 1935–1952 Head Coach Clinton Wildcats 1931–1934 3X State Champs 31,32,33. Indiana Football Hall Of Fame
- Tony Berto 1939 – Coached 39 years total – Otsego, Michigan, High School 1946–1948, Boonville HS 1948–1952, and Delphi HS 1952–1985; coached 3 sports for 24 years and 2 sports for 15 years (football, basketball, baseball, track, and golf); Delphi football record of 203 wins. Lettered at Purdue 1939–1943 in Football Basketball and Baseball. Indiana Football Hall Of Fame
- Gerry Dick 1976 QB – American journalist and former news anchor at WRTV, a television station in Indianapolis, Indiana.He is best known as the current host of Inside INdiana Business, a television program owned by Grow Indiana Media Ventures.
