= Erik Campbell (American football) =

American gridiron football player and coach (born 1966)

Current position
- Title: Wide receivers coach
- Team: Eastern Michigan
- Conference: MAC

Biographical details
- Born: January 21, 1966 (age 60); Gary, Indiana, U.S.
- Education: Michigan

Playing career
- 1984–1987: Michigan
- Positions: Safety, wide receiver

Coaching career (HC unless noted)
- 1988: Michigan (GA)
- 1989–1990: Navy (RB)
- 1991–1993: Ball State (RB)
- 1994: Syracuse (RB)
- 1995–2002: Michigan (WR)
- 2003–2007: Michigan (AHC/WR)
- 2008–2012: Iowa (WR)
- 2013–2014: Montreal Alouettes (WR)
- 2015: Michigan (assistant)
- 2016: UConn (WR)
- 2017–2018: Delaware (WR/PGC)
- 2019–2024: Bowling Green (WR/PGC)
- 2025: Michigan (Asst. WR)
- 2026–present: Eastern Michigan (WR)

John Erik "Soup" Campbell (born January 21, 1966) is an American college football coach and former player. He is currently the wide receivers coach for Eastern Michigan University.

Campbell played college football at the University of Michigan from 1984 to 1987. He has held coaching positions at the United States Naval Academy (1989–1990), Ball State University (1991–1993), Syracuse University (1994), the University of Michigan (1988, 1995–2007, 2015, 2025), the University of Iowa (2008–2012), the Montreal Alouettes of the Canadian Football League (2013–2014), the University of Connecticut (2016), University of Delaware (2017–2018) and Bowling Green State University (2019–2024). He was the assistant head coach at Michigan under Lloyd Carr from 2003 to 2007.

== Early years ==
Campbell is a native of Gary, Indiana, who played football and ran track at Gary's Theodore Roosevelt High School. He was also an all-state player in football and an All-American in track while in high school. He has been inducted into both the Indiana High School Track and Field Hall of Fame and the Indiana High School Football Hall of Fame.

== University of Michigan ==
He attended the University of Michigan where he played for Bo Schembechler on the Michigan Wolverines football team from 1984 to 1987. He started five games at free safety as a freshman in 1984. As a sophomore in 1985, Campbell switched to the offensive squad and saw action as a wide receiver. He also returned 14 punts in 1985 for 120 yards, an average of 8.6 yards per return. Campbell moved back to the defensive squad in 1986, starting 11 games at cornerback and two at free safety on a team that won the Big Ten Conference championship with a No. 8 ranking in the final AP poll. As a senior in 1987, Campbell started seven games at cornerback and five games at free safety. Campbell totaled 98 tackles, five interceptions and 17 punt returns for 132 yards (7.8 yard average) in four years at Michigan. He graduated in 1988 with a Bachelor of Arts degree in general studies.

== Coaching career ==
Campbell began his coaching career as a graduate assistant at Michigan during the 1988 season. He next accepted a position as an assistant coach at Navy, coaching the Midshipmen running backs from 1989 to 1990. He also held coaching positions at Ball State University (running backs coach, 1991–1993) and Syracuse (1994).

In February 1995, Campbell returned to his alma mater as an assistant football coach at Michigan. He was a member of Michigan's coaching staff for 13 years from 1995 to 2007. At Michigan, Campbell coached wide receivers and punt returners. He was also the team's assistant head coach from 2003 to 2007. He set an NCAA record by coaching a 1,000-yard receiver for eight consecutive years from 1998 to 2005. During his tenure at Michigan, he coached receivers Braylon Edwards, David Terrell, Marquise Walker, Amani Toomer, Mercury Hayes, Tai Streets, Marcus Knight, Jason Avant, Mario Manningham, Adrian Arrington, Steve Breaston, and Ronald Bellamy. He also coached Charles Woodson as a punt returner, and Steve Breaston set a Big Ten record with 1,599 career punt return yards (12.6 yards per return) with Campbell as his position coach. In December 2007, incoming Michigan head coach Rich Rodriguez announced that he had fired all nine assistant coaches, including Campbell.

In February 2008, Campbell was hired by the University of Iowa as its wide receivers and tight ends coach. Upon hiring Campbell, Iowa head coach Kirk Ferentz said, "Erik's a student of the game and a great young coach. We're thrilled to have him on our staff." Starting in 2010, his responsibility was limited to wide receivers. In 2010, two Iowa wide receivers (Derrell Johnson-Koulianos and Marvin McNutt were both selected for All-Big Ten honors. Johnson-Koulianos set Iowa's career record for receiving yards with Campbell as his position coach. In 2011, Marvin McNutt was selected as an All-American receiver, as he compiled 1,315 receiving yards and 12 touchdowns. McNutt also broke Johnson-Koulianos' school record with a career total of 2,861 receiving yards. Campbell also coached Tony Moeaki during the 2009 season. In February 2012, The Daily Iowan published a "point/counterpoint" debate on the proposed promotion of Campbell as the team's new offensive coordinator.

In 2015, Campbell joined the Michigan Wolverines football support staff as a football operations assistant under new head coach Jim Harbaugh. Campbell and Harbaugh were teammates at Michigan from 1984 to 1986.

On April 20, 2017, Campbell was named to the Delaware Fightin' Blue Hens football staff under new head coach Danny Rocco, after having served as the wide receiver coach at the University of Connecticut the previous season.

== Personal life ==
Campbell's wife, Lori, died of a brain aneurysm in March 2001, at age 30.
