= Covington Community High School =

Location
- 1017 6th Street; Covington, Indiana 47932; United States; 40.143121°N 87.395433°W

Information
- Type: Public high school
- Principal: Krista Witsman
- Teaching staff: 26.00(FTE)
- Grades: 9–12
- Enrollment: 281 (2023–2024)
- Student to teacher ratio: 10.81
- Color
- Team name: Trojans
- Rivals: Fountain Central, Attica, North Vermillion
- Website: chs.covington.k12.in.us

Covington Community High School is a high school located in Covington, Indiana, United States. The school was given a "B" grade for accountability by the Indiana Department of Education in 2016.

== Athletics ==
The Trojans are members of the Wabash River Conference.

- Baseball (boys)
  - 12 sectional championships 1977–78, 1979–80, 1980–81, 1982–83, 1983–84, 1984–85, 1986–87, 1993–94, 2002–03 (2A), 2004–05 (A), 2006–07 (A), 2017–18 (A)
- Basketball (boys & girls)
  - boys 25 sectional championship 1922–23, 1944–45, 1946–47, 1950–51, 1955–56, 1959–60, 1969–70, 1970–71, 1973–74, 1976–77, 1983–84, 1984–85, 1987–88, 1987–88, 1997–98 (A), 2000–01 (2A), 2001–02 (2A), 2002–03 (2A), 2003–04 (A), 2004–05 (A), 2006–07 (A), 2009–10 (A), 2015–16 (2A), 2016–17 (2A), 2017–18 (2A)
  - boys 4 regional championship 1944–45, 1950–51, 1959–60, 2000–01 (2A)
  - girls 5 sectional championships 1978–79, 1981–82, 1986–87, 1996–97, 1998–99 (A)
- Cross country (co-ed)
- Cheerleading (co-ed)
- Football (boys)
  - Wabash River Conference Champions 1964 (Undefeated)
- Volleyball (girls)
  - 9 sectional championships 1983, 1985, 1986, 1992, 1995, 2015 (2A), 2016 (2A), 2017 (A), 2018 (A)
  - 1 regional championship 2018 (A)
- Golf (boys & girls)
- Softball (girls)
  - 3 sectional championships 2012–13 (A), 2013–14 (A), 2014–15 (A)
- Tennis (boys & girls)
  - boys 8 sectional championships 1991, 1992, 1993, 2000, 2001, 2002, 2004, 2016
  - girls 7 sectional championships 1992–93, 1993–94, 1994–95, 1995–96, 1996–97, 1997–98, 1999–2000
- Track & field (co-ed)
- Soccer (co-ed)
  - 4 sectional championships 2012 (A), 2013 (A), 2014 (A), 2016 (A)
- Wrestling (boys)
  - 2 sectional championships 1985–86, 1999–2000

== See also ==
- List of high schools in Indiana
