= Turkey Run High School =

Turkey Run Junior-Senior High School

Location
- 1551 East SR 47; Marshall, Parke County, Indiana 47859; United States
- 39.876881°N 87.211807°W

Information
- Type: Public high school
- Principal: Scott Schulz
- Faculty: 24.00 FTE
- Grades: 6-12
- Enrollment: 241 (2014-15)
- Color
- Athletics conference: Wabash River Conference
- Team name: Warriors
- Website: Official Website

Turkey Run Junior-Senior High School was a public high school in Marshall, Indiana. It closed after 2017–18 school year, consolidated into Parke Heritage High School. Currently used as an elementary school.

== Notable alumni ==
Jim Baird (politician), US representative from Indiana's 4th congressional district

== See also ==
- List of high schools in Indiana
