= Gerry Dick =

American journalist

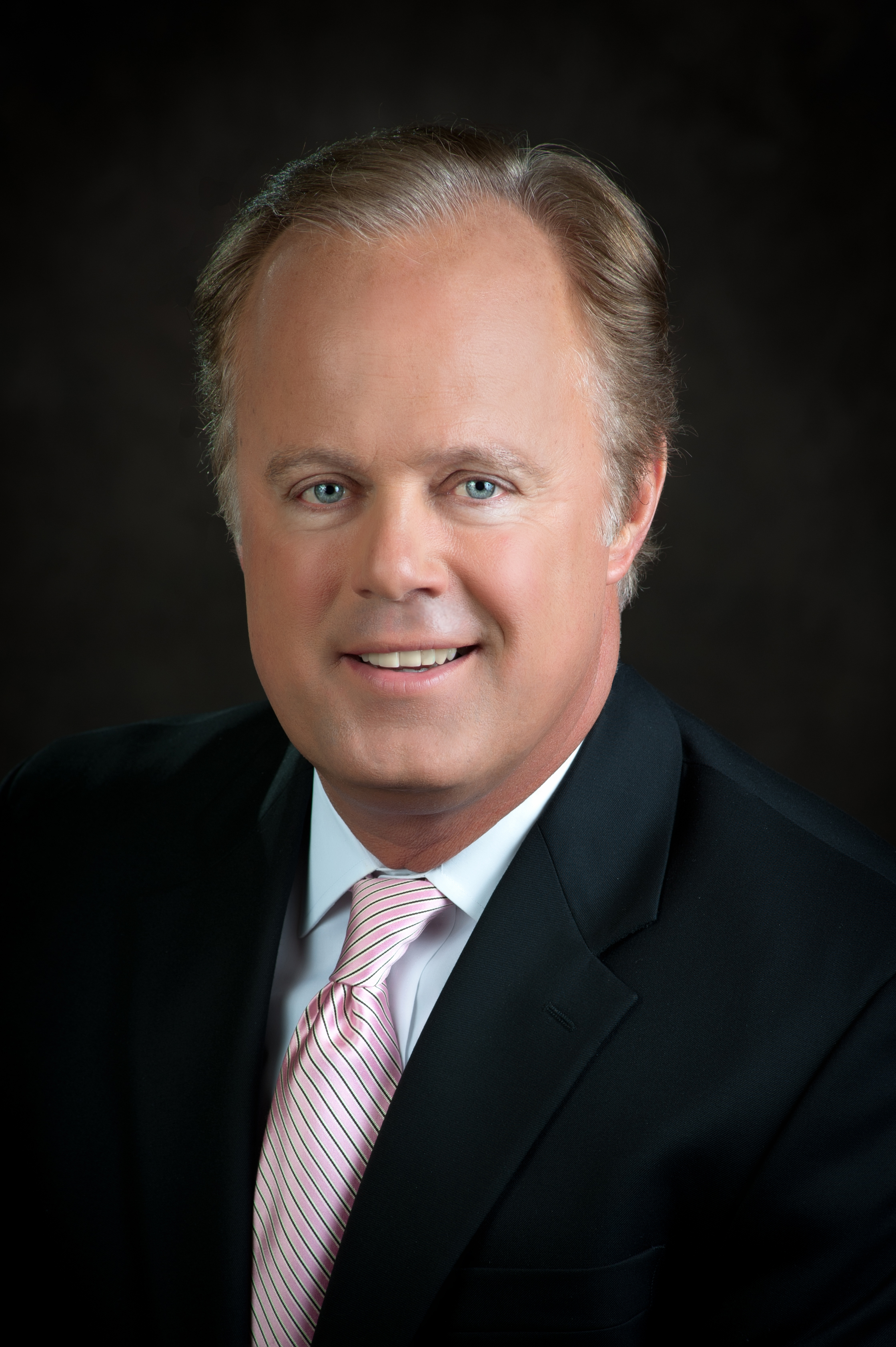
- Gerry Dick, host of Inside INdiana Business with Gerry Dick
- Born: Gerry A. Dick; Clinton, Indiana, United States
- Education: Clinton High School, Indiana; Indiana State University
- Occupations: News presenter, reporter, journalist
- Years active: 1983–present
- Employer: Grow Indiana Media Ventures
- Known for: Host of Inside INdiana Business with Gerry Dick
- Notable work: www.insideindianabusiness.com www.boardroomchat.com Inside INdiana Business Radio; The Inside Edge
- Television: Inside Indiana Business with Gerry Dick
- Awards: See Awards section

Gerry A. Dick is an American journalist and former news anchor at WRTV, a television station in Indianapolis, Indiana. He is best known as the current host of Inside INdiana Business, a television program owned by Grow Indiana Media Ventures, founded by Dick along with technology business owner Scott A. Jones.

== History ==
=== Early years ===
Born in Clinton, Indiana, Dick attended Indiana State University where he earned his Bachelor of Science degree in Radio-TV-Film. Following his education, he worked for television station WRTV as a journalist and news anchor, where he was nominated for an Emmy Award for his 1993 stories regarding Indiana companies doing business along the United States southern border. After 14 years at the network, he acted as the Senior Vice President for Indianapolis Economic Development Corporation. Dick has also held journalist positions at Indiana television stations in Fort Wayne and Terre Haute.

=== Grow Indiana Media Ventures ===
In 2000, Grow Indiana Media Ventures was started to provide business news focused on the state of Indiana. With Jones serving as chairman of the company, Dick serves as the managing editor in addition to acting as the host of Inside INdiana Business with Gerry Dick. The work is dubbed by Indiana State University and Indianapolis television station WFYI as the "most watched local business television program" in the state.

== Activities ==
Dick is active in central Indiana in addition to supporting his alma mater. He acts as a vice president at Indiana Sports Corporation, serves on the board of directors of the International Center (in Indianapolis), Indiana Chamber of Commerce, Indianapolis Bar Foundation, and Junior Achievement of Central Indiana. He is on the regional board of trustees at Ivy Tech State College and founded the Dean's Council for the School of Informatics at Indiana University. He is also a member of the advisory boards for WGU Indiana, Indiana University – Purdue University Indianapolis, the Scott College of Business at Indiana State University and the Indiana University Simon Cancer Center Translational Research Acceleration Collaboration (ITRAC).

He now resides in Indianapolis with his wife and three children.

=== Other journalism work ===
Dick is also a frequent provider of news segments regarding local business to WTHR Channel 13 Eyewitness News, with reports shown on programs such as Eyewitness News at 5 pm and Eyewitness News Sunrise. He acts as a business analyst for Indianapolis television station WISH-TV and central Indiana radio station WIBC.

=== Awards ===
In 2004, Dick was awarded the Sagamore of the Wabash (the top honor in Indiana) and received the Ernst & Young Entrepreneur of the Year award. His Inside INdiana Business news program has received multiple Emmy Awards for "Best Interview/Discussion Program", including one for its special on the "Big Business of Craft Beer". Hhe has received four Emmy nominations for Inside INdiana Business with Gerry Dick while being recognized as "Journalist of the Year" by the Small Business Administration. In 2010, his alma mater bestowed upon him a distinguished alumni award.
