= Dana Trent =

American author, teacher, and minister

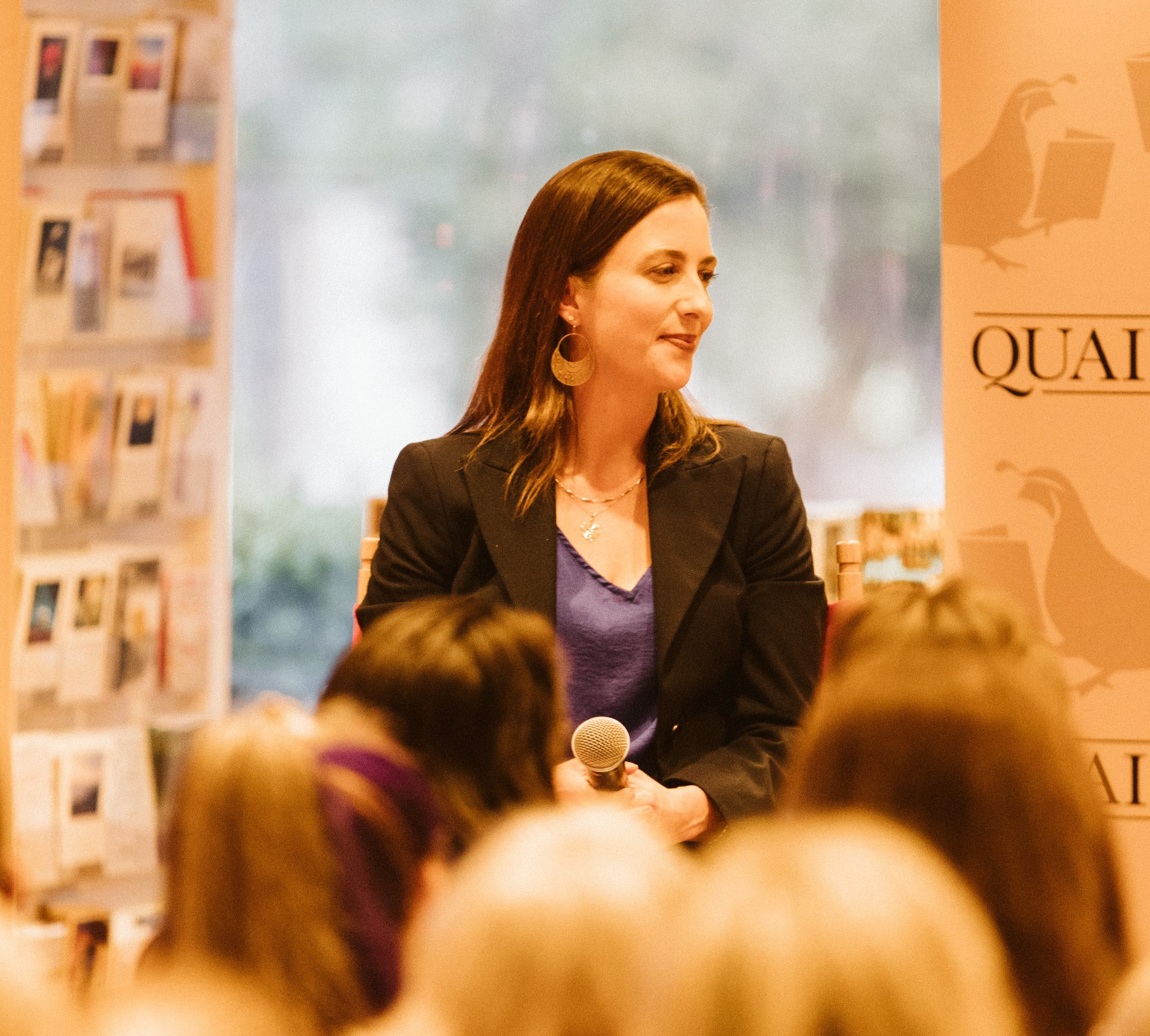
- Trent at the launch of Between Two Trailers at Quail Ridge Books in Raleigh, NC. 2024.
- Born: Judith Dana Lewman; April 11, 1981 (age 45); Arcadia, California, U.S.
- Education: Salem College; Duke University
- Occupations: Author; professor; podcaster
- Years active: 2013–present
- Website: jdanatrent.com

Dana Trent (née Lewman / lumən /; born April 11, 1981), known professionally as J. Dana Trent, is an American author, teacher, and minister. Trent is a full-time humanities faculty member at Wake Tech Community College in Raleigh, North Carolina. Trent's debut memoir from Penguin Random House, Between Two Trailers, received a starred review from Library Journal. Kirkus Reviews calls it a "A powerfully intimate look into the struggles of American poverty and mental illness." Publishers Weekly compared Trent's work to Jeannette Walls and Tara Westover.

== Early Books ==
She is the author of four books: Saffron Cross: The Unlikely Story of How a Christian Minister Married a Hindu Monk (2013), For Sabbath's Sake: Embracing Your Need for Rest, Worship, and Community (2017), One Breath at a Time: A Skeptic's Guide to Christian Meditation (2019), and Dessert First: Preparing for Death While Savoring Life (2019).

== Early life ==
Trent's father, Richard Lewman, was a recreational therapist diagnosed with schizoaffective disorder. Her mother had mental illness too. The couple met in a locked inpatient psychiatric institute four years before she was born. Her parents followed televangelist Robert Schuller to Los Angeles before she was born to be near the Crystal Cathedral. They hoped Schuller's message of self-healing and self-empowerment would allow them to conceive a child. About a year later, Trent was born in Los Angeles and named for the Indiana town where her father was from.

Trent was born in Los Angeles, and moved to Dana, Indiana as an infant. According to Religion News Service, Trent grew up in a trailer in the small town of Dana, Indiana, the daughter of parents who sold and used drugs. Trent's father trained her in the drug business; her street name was "Budgie." The name is a label given to parakeets. She lived in Indiana until age six, when her parents divorced and she moved with her mother to North Carolina. Trent attended Reidsville High School in Reidsville, North Carolina, and won a Rockingham Community College sponsored speech contest for high schoolers in 1996. She was the 1998 winner of the "I Dare You Leadership Award."

== Podcast ==
Trent first publicly shared her drug-trafficking upbringing in "Breaking Good," a podcast produced in conjunction with the Lilly Endowment-funded Louisville Institute. Trent is writing a book version of the podcast that will tell the story in greater depth. Her agent is Mark Tauber.

== Controversy ==
Trent is one of only 2,500 women total ordained in the Southern Baptist tradition. She is publicly critical of Beth Moore, criticizing Moore's stance on complementarianism. On State of Belief with Welton Gaddy, Trent questioned Moore's apology and timing of leaving the Southern Baptist Convention. Trent says that Moore was unwilling to abandon complementarianism all together, suggesting that Moore believes there are circumstances in which complementarianism is appropriate and that Moore benefits from a "neutral posture" on complementarianism.

== Career ==
Trent is one of the few female ordained Southern Baptist ministers in the United States. She graduated from Duke Divinity School with a Master of Divinity in 2006. After graduating from Duke at the age of 25, she served as a UNC Health intensive care resident chaplain where she worked with terminal patients and bore witness to 200 deaths in one year. Publishers Weekly called Trent's fourth book, Dessert First, "hilarious and poignant." According to Englewood Review of Books, Dessert First decidedly is not a treatise expounding traditional Christian views on death. Trent's focus instead is starting the conversation about death early and often, regardless of the reader's faith background.

== Personal life ==
Trent married Fred Eaker in July 2010 after meeting him on eHarmony.

== Works ==
- Trent, J. Dana (2013). Saffron Cross: The Unlikely Story of How a Christian Minister Married a Hindu Monk. Fresh Air Books. ISBN 978-1-935205-16-6.
- Trent, J. Dana (2017-10-01). For Sabbath's Sake: Embracing Your Need for Rest, Worship, and Community. Upper Room Books. ISBN 978-0-8358-1721-9.
- Trent, J. Dana (2019-01-01). One Breath at a Time: A Skeptic's Guide to Christian Meditation. Upper Room Books. ISBN 978-0-8358-1857-5.
- Trent, J. Dana (2019-09-10). Dessert First: Preparing for Death While Savoring Life. Chalice Press. ISBN 978-0-8272-0669-4.
