= Indiana big school football champions =

American high school football

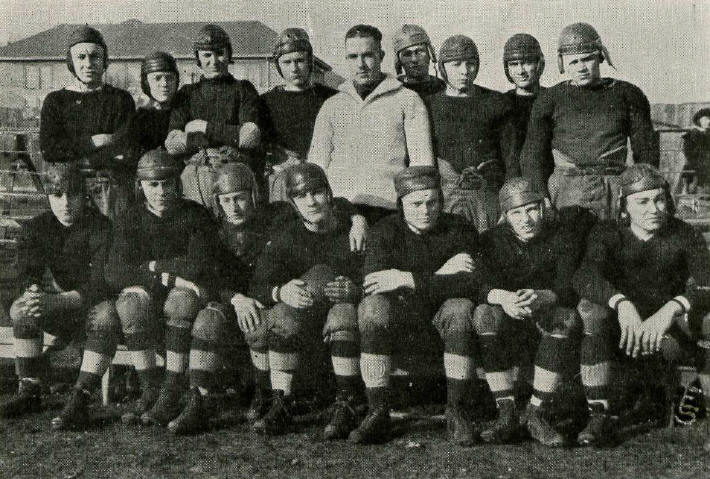
Indiana High School football team, circa 1921

Better known for its high school basketball, Indiana high school football has also been a staple of Hoosier weekends for more than 100 years. In 1930, more than 30,000 people jammed Notre Dame Stadium to watch Mishawaka beat undefeated South Bend Central, 6–0. At the time, it was one of the largest crowds to witness a high school football game in the United States. Indiana high school football is still immensely popular, with tens of thousands now packing Lucas Oil Stadium in Indianapolis to watch six state championship games over two days in November. The following is a history of Indiana's big school state football championship.

== 1920–1936: The North and mythical state champions ==
From the late 1800s through 1919, Indiana high school football teams often played fewer than five games per year and many times skipped entire seasons. Pre-1920 games often featured high school teams playing semi-pro club teams, college teams, and even intramural scrimmages. Various teams made state championship claims, but most were unfounded until organized leagues and verified games became commonplace beginning with the 1920 season. By that year, as many as 26 high schools in northern Indiana – stretching from Fort Wayne to East Chicago – were annually compiling standings and functioning as the state's first organized football conference. These northern football teams frequently defeated powerhouse teams from other states and were rarely defeated by Indiana teams from outside the league. For example, From 1921 to 1926, Gary Emerson never lost a game to an in-state team. The winner of this early super conference usually claimed the "mythical" state football championship prior to 1928. Indeed, when an Indiana mythical state championship game was played between the best teams of northern and southern Indiana (in 1923, 1924, 1927, 1929, and 1930) the northern league champion won every time.

In 1926, for one year, the league standings included power teams from around the state, including Evansville Central, Richmond, Indianapolis Tech, Marion, and Muncie, all of whom finished behind league leaders Mishawaka and Gary Emerson. In 1927, many of these same northern teams – from Elkhart to East Chicago – officially formed the Northern Indiana Conference (NIC), with its champion going on to dominate the #1 final ranking in the AP and UPI polls well into the 1960s.

By the early 1930s, the Evansville and Terre Haute areas were also well established as Indiana high school football hotbeds. Clinton (north of Terre Haute) won three titles between 1928 and 1933, and Evansville Memorial, best in the south in 1937, defeated McKeesport, champions of Western Pennsylvania, 21–0, in what some newspapers called the mythical national championship.

The following teams were widely considered the state football champions: Schools in italics are now consolidated or defunct.

- 1920 - Wabash^{4} and Mishawaka^{1}
- 1921 - Gary Emerson^{1} and Gary Froebel^{1}
- 1922 - Gary Emerson^{1} (2)
- 1923 - Gary Emerson² (3)
- 1924 - Elkhart (Central)²
- 1925 - Mishawaka^{1,4} (2)
- 1926 - Mishawaka^{1} (3)
- 1927 - Gary Froebel² (2)
- 1928 - Clinton³
- 1929 - Gary Mann²^{,}³
- 1930 - Gary Emerson²^{,}³ (4)
- 1931 - South Bend Central^{4}
- 1932 - Clinton³ (2)
- 1933 - Clinton²^{,}³ (3)
- 1934 - South Bend Central^{1,4} (2) and Terre Haute Garfield^{4}
- 1935 - Evansville Memorial²^{,}³
- 1936 - Gary Mann^{5} (2)

^{1} NIC Champion

^{2} Winner of arranged post-season North-South Mythical State Championship Game

- 1923 - Gary Emerson 7, Muncie Central 0
- 1924 - Elkhart (Central) 28, Bicknell 6
- 1927 - Gary Froebel 70, Indianapolis Shortridge 0
- 1929 - Gary Mann 38, Fort Wayne Central 0
- 1930 - Gary Emerson 21, Logansport 7
- 1933 - Clinton 6, East Chicago Washington 6, tie
- 1935 - Evansville Memorial 13, Fort Wayne Central 0

^{3} Winner of Indianapolis Times and IHSAA ‘Most Outstanding Team in Indiana’ Trophy – 1927, 1928, 1929, 1930, 1932, 1933, and 1935

^{4} Mythical State Champions named by various Indiana newspapers, according to AlmanacSports.com – 1920, 1925, 1931 and 1934

^{5} NIC East-West Playoff Champion - 1936 (no other claims found)

( ) Total state championships

== 1937–1972: The polls rule ==
The AP and UP(I) Polls awarded Mythical State Football Championships from 1937 to 1972. Many schools went on to play postseason games after the final polls were released and many schools subsequently and rightly disputed these AP/UPI mythical championships.

- 1937 - Hammond
- 1938 - Evansville Memorial (2)
- 1939 - South Bend Washington
- 1940 - Fort Wayne North
- 1941 - Gary Wallace
- 1942 - East Chicago Washington (2)
- 1943 - South Bend Washington (2)
- 1944 - Muncie Central
- 1945 - East Chicago Roosevelt
- 1946 - East Chicago Roosevelt (2)
- 1947 - East Chicago Roosevelt (3)
- 1948 - Evansville Reitz
- 1949 - East Chicago Roosevelt (4)
- 1950 - Lafayette Jefferson
- 1951 - Hammond Bishop Noll*
- 1952 - Richmond
- 1953 - South Bend Washington (3)
- 1954 - Whiting
- 1955 - East Chicago Roosevelt (5)
- 1956 - Richmond (2)
- 1957 - Evansville Reitz (2) & East Chicago Roosevelt (6)
- 1958 - South Bend Central (3)
- 1959 - South Bend Central (4)
- 1960 - Evansville Reitz (3) & Hammond (2)
- 1961 - Evansville Reitz (4)
- 1962 - Hammond (3)
- 1963 - Elkhart (Central) (2)
- 1964 - South Bend St. Joseph*
- 1965 - Hammond Morton
- 1966 - Indianapolis Washington
- 1967 - Richmond (3)
- 1968 - Bloomington (South) & Elkhart (Central) (3)
- 1969 - South Bend Washington (4)
- 1970 - Elkhart (Central) (4)
- 1971 - Evansville Reitz (5)*
- 1972 - Bloomington South (2)

( ) Total state championships

* Evansville Reitz also went on to win a 4A smaller school state championships in 2007 and 2009, as did South Bend St. Joseph (3A) in 1995, and Hammond Bishop Noll (3A) in 1989. See Indiana High School Football Champions - Smaller Schools.

== 1973–present: Settling it on the field - the rise of Indianapolis football ==
IHSAA State Tournament Champions. Over the years the largest enrollment classification has moved from 3A, to 4A, to 5A, and now to 6A. For a listing of smaller school state champions see Indiana high school football champions – smaller schools.

=== 3A ===
- 1973 - South Bend Washington (5)
- 1974 - Indianapolis Washington (2)
- 1975 - Valparaiso
- 1976 - Merrillville
- 1977 - Portage
- 1978 - Carmel
- 1979 - Columbus East
- 1980 - Carmel (2)
- 1981 - Carmel (3)
- 1982 - Castle

=== 4A ===
- 1983 - (Mishawaka) Penn
- 1984 - Indianapolis Warren Central
- 1985 - Brownsburg (2)
- 1986 - DeKalb
- 1987 - Hobart
- 1988 - Goshen
- 1989 - Hobart (2)
- 1990 - Franklin Central
- 1991 - Hobart (3)
- 1992 - West Lafayette Harrison
- 1993 - Hobart (4)
- 1994 - East Central
- 1995 - Fort Wayne Wayne
- 1996 - Indianapolis Cathedral (3)
- 1997 - Griffith
- 1998 - Indianapolis Cathedral (4)
- 1999 - Indianapolis Cathedral (5)
- 2000 - East Noble
- 2001 - Jasper
- 2002 - Indianapolis Roncalli (6)
- 2003 - Indianapolis Roncalli (7)
- 2004 - Indianapolis Roncalli (8)
- 2005 - Lowell
- 2006 - Indianapolis Cathedral (6)
- 2007 - Evansville Reitz (6)
- 2008 - Indianapolis Cathedral (7)
- 2009 - Evansville Reitz (7)
- 2010 - Indianapolis Cathedral (8)
- 2011 - Indianapolis Cathedral (9)
- 2012 - Indianapolis Cathedral (10)
- 2013 - Columbus East (2)
- 2014 - New Palestine
- 2015 - Fort Wayne Dwenger (4)
- 2016 - Indianapolis Roncalli (9)
- 2017 - East Central (2)
- 2018 - Fort Wayne Dwenger (5)
- 2019 - Evansville Memorial (4)
- 2020 - Indianapolis Roncalli (10)
- 2021 - Mount Vernon (Fortville)
- 2022 - East Central (3)
- 2023 - East Central (4)
- 2024 - New Palestine (4)
- 2025 - Fort Wayne Dwenger (6)

=== 5A ===
- 1985 - Indianapolis Warren Central (2)
- 1986 - Carmel (4)
- 1987 - Indianapolis Ben Davis
- 1988 - Indianapolis Ben Davis (2)
- 1989 - Carmel (5)
- 1990 - Indianapolis Ben Davis (3)
- 1991 - Indianapolis Ben Davis (4)
- 1992 - Fort Wayne Snider
- 1993 - Bloomington South (3)
- 1994 - Castle (2)
- 1995 - (Mishawaka) Penn (2)
- 1996 - (Mishawaka) Penn (3)
- 1997 - (Mishawaka) Penn (4)
- 1998 - Bloomington South (4)
- 1999 - Indianapolis Ben Davis (5)
- 2000 - (Mishawaka) Penn (5)
- 2001 - Indianapolis Ben Davis (6)
- 2002 - Indianapolis Ben Davis (7)
- 2003 - Indianapolis Warren Central (3)
- 2004 - Indianapolis Warren Central (4)
- 2005 - Indianapolis Warren Central (5)
- 2006 - Indianapolis Warren Central (6)
- 2007 - Carmel (6)
- 2008 - Center Grove
- 2009 - Warren Central (7)
- 2010 - Fishers
- 2011 - Carmel (7)
- 2012 - Indianapolis Lawrence Central
- 2013 - Indianapolis Cathedral (11)
- 2014 - Indianapolis Cathedral (12)
- 2015 - Fort Wayne Snider (2)
- 2016 - Westfield
- 2017 - Columbus East (3)
- 2018 - New Palestine (2)
- 2019 - New Palestine (3)
- 2020 - Indianapolis Cathedral (13)
- 2021 - Indianapolis Cathedral (14)
- 2022 - Valparaiso
- 2023 - Fort Wayne Snider (3)
- 2024 - Decatur Central
- 2025 - New Palestine (5)

=== 6A ===
- 2013 - Indianapolis Warren Central (8)
- 2014 - Indianapolis Ben Davis (8)
- 2015 - Center Grove (2)
- 2016 - Carmel (8)
- 2017 - Indianapolis Ben Davis (9)
- 2018 - Indianapolis Warren Central (9)
- 2019 - Carmel (9)
- 2020 - Center Grove (3)
- 2021 - Center Grove (4)
- 2022 - Center Grove (5)
- 2023 - Indianapolis Ben Davis (10)
- 2024 - Brownsburg (3)
- 2025 - Brownsburg (4)

( ) Total state championships

== Championships by school ==
The schools with the greatest number of championships in all classes are:

- 1. Indianapolis Chatard - 17
- 2. Indianapolis Cathedral - 14
- 3. Fort Wayne Bishop Luers - 12
- 4. Indianapolis Roncalli - 10
- 4. Ben Davis - 10
- 6. Carmel - 9
- 6. Sheridan - 9
- 6. Warren Central - 9
- 9. Lafayette Central Catholic - 8
- 10. Fort Wayne Bishop Dwenger - 6
- 10. East Chicago Roosevelt - 6
- 12. Evansville Reitz - 5
- 12. Penn - 5
- 12. Indianapolis Cardinal Ritter - 5
- 12. Center Grove - 5
- 12. New Palestine - 5
- 12. South Bend Washington - 5
- 18. Bloomington South - 4
- 18. Hobart - 4
- 18. Andrean - 4
- 18. Brownsburg - 4
- 18. Elkhart Central - 4
- 18. East Central - 4
- 18. Franklin Central - 4
- 18. Gary Emerson - 4
- 18. Jimtown - 4
- 18. South Bend Central - 4
- 18. Tri-West - 4
- 18. Western Boone - 4
- 30. Richmond - 3
- 30. Mishawaka - 3
- 30. Clinton - 3
- 33. Adams Central - 2
- 33. Blackford - 2
- 33. Bremen - 2
- 33. Castle - 2
- 33. Evansville Mater Dei - 2
- 33. Evansville Memorial - 2
- 33. Gary Mann - 2
- 33. Gary Froebel - 2
- 33. Goshen - 2
- 33. Heritage Hills - 2
- 33. Indianapolis Scecina Memorial
- 33. Indianapolis Washington - 2
- 33. Hammond - 2
- 33. Lawrenceburg - 2
- 33. North Montgomery - 2
- 33. South Putnam - 2
- 33. Valparaiso - 2
- 33. Zionsville - 2

== Big school state championships by region ==
- Indianapolis Metro - 37
- Northwest Indiana: The Region - 24
- South Bend/Mishawaka/Elkhart - 22
- Evansville - 9
- Bloomington - 4
- Fort Wayne - 4
- Terre Haute/Clinton - 4
- Richmond - 3
- Other - 3

== See also ==
- Indiana high school football champions – smaller schools
- Indiana High School Boys Basketball Champions
