= North Central Parke Community School Corporation =

School district in Indiana, United States

North Central Parke Community School Corporation is a school district headquartered in Rockville, Indiana.

The district comprises the following townships: Adams, Greene, Howard, Liberty, Penn, Sugar Creek, Union, and Washington. It includes Rockville, Bloomingdale, and Marshall.

== History ==
It was created as a consolidation of the Rockville Community Schools and Turkey Run Community School Corporation school districts. According to administrators in those two districts, they decided to merge because the State of Indiana had reduced the amount of grant money, and that the two school districts had smaller numbers of students than before. As part of the merger, the district continued to maintain two separate secondary schools from each pre-merger district.

Numbers of students in the secondary schools declined. In 2017, the district decided to merge the two high schools into one at the Rockville site, while the junior high schools combined at the Turkey Run site. All seven board members voted to consolidate the secondary schools. The consolidation was effective in 2018. Parke Heritage High School is the resulting high school.

== Schools ==
- Parke Heritage High School
- Parke Heritage Middle School
- Turkey Run Elementary School
- Rockville Elementary School
