= Indiana High School Football Conference =

The Indiana High School Football Conference was an Indiana High School Athletic Association (IHSAA)-sanctioned conference founded in 1926 by 10 members. The founding members were:

- Elwood
- Evansville Central
- Fort Wayne South
- Gary Emerson
- Indianapolis Tech
- Mishawaka
- Muncie
- Richmond Morton
- South Bend Central
- Terre Haute Gerstmeyer

7 teams withdrew Fort Wayne South (1926); Terre Haute Gerstmeyer (1926); Mishawaka (1927); Richmond (1927); Gary Emerson (1928); South Bend Central (1928); New Castle (1930).

Added (12): Linton-Stockton (1926); Marion (1926); Clinton (1928); Logansport (1928); Bicknell (1929); Kokomo (1929); Bloomington (1930); Brazil (1930); New Castle (1930); Wabash (1930); Sullivan (1931); Vincennes Lincoln (1931).

The conference ended in 1931 and the final members were (15):

- Bicknell
- Bloomington
- Brazil
- Clinton
- Elwood
- Evansville Central
- Indianapolis Tech
- Kokomo
- Linton-Stockton
- Logansport
- Marion
- Muncie Central
- Sullivan
- Vincennes Lincoln
- Wabash.

== Champions ==
- 1926 Gary Emerson (3–0) & Mishawaka (3–0)
- 1927 Linton-Stockton (4–1) & Muncie (4–1–1)
- 1928 Clinton (4–0)
- 1929 Clinton
- 1930 Logansport (4–0)
- 1931 Clinton (3–0) & Marion (5–0)

== Resources ==
- IHSAA Conferences
- IHSAA Directory
