= Dana, Indiana =

- Town
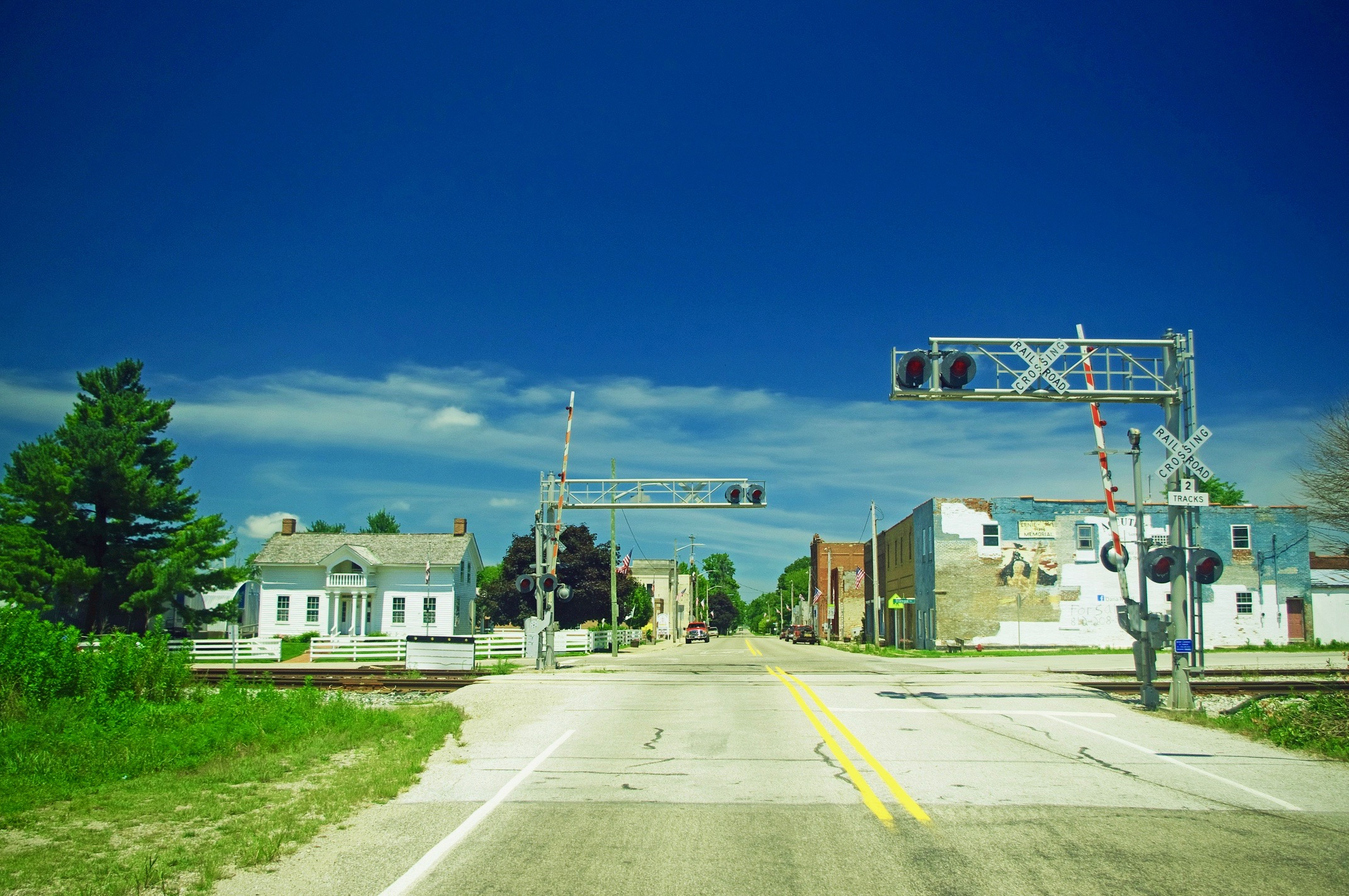
- Maple Street (SR 71)

- Location of Dana in Vermillion County, Indiana.

- Map of Dana
- Coordinates: 39°48′26″N 87°29′40″W
- Country: United States
- State: Indiana
- County: Vermillion
- Township: Helt
- Established: 1874

Area
  - Total: 0.29 sq mi (0.76 km^{2})
  - Land: 0.29 sq mi (0.76 km^{2})
  - Water: 0 sq mi (0.00 km^{2})
- Elevation: 640 ft (200 m)

Population (2020)
  - Total: 555
  - Density: 1,900.8/sq mi (733.89/km^{2})
- Time zone: UTC-5 (EST)
  - Summer (DST): UTC-5 (EST)
- ZIP code: 47847
- Area code: 765
- FIPS code: 18-16732
- GNIS feature ID: 2396677

Dana is a town in Helt Township, Vermillion County, Indiana, United States. The population was 555 at the 2020 census. It is primarily a farming community.

== History ==
Dana was platted in 1874 when the railroad was extended to that point. The town was named for Charles Dana, a railroad promoter. A post office has been in operation at Dana since 1874. Dana was incorporated in 1886. In 1886, Dana was declared a rapidly growing and vibrant community, due to its railroad, businesses, and agriculture.

== Geography ==
Dana is located in the central part of the county, on Indiana State Road 71 less than 0.5 miles (0.80 km) north of U.S. Route 36.

According to the 2010 census, Dana has a total area of 0.29 square miles (0.75 km^{2}), all land.

== Demographics ==
Historical population
Census	Pop.	Note	%±
1880	183		—
1890	495		170.5%
1900	893		80.4%
1910	748		−16.2%
1920	884		18.2%
1930	859		−2.8%
1940	845		−1.6%
1950	854		1.1%
1960	811		−5.0%
1970	720		−11.2%
1980	803		11.5%
1990	612		−23.8%
2000	662		8.2%
2010	608		−8.2%
2020	555		−8.7%
U.S. Decennial Census

=== 2020 census ===
While 2020 census figures are not finalized, the U.S. Census Bureau estimates that Dana's population has dropped from 608 to 570. Poverty and joblessness remain an issue in the town.

=== 2010 census ===
As of the census of 2010, there were 608 people, 241 households, and 173 families living in the town. The population density was 2,096.6 inhabitants per square mile (809.5/km^{2}). There were 290 housing units at an average density of 1,000.0 per square mile (386.1/km^{2}). The racial makeup of the town was 97.5% White, 0.2% African American, 0.5% Native American, 0.2% Asian, 0.7% from other races, and 1.0% from two or more races. Hispanic or Latino of any race were 1.3% of the population.

There were 241 households, of which 34.0% had children under the age of 18 living with them, 59.8% were married couples living together, 9.5% had a female householder with no husband present, 2.5% had a male householder with no wife present, and 28.2% were non-families. 25.7% of all households were made up of individuals, and 14.5% had someone living alone who was 65 years of age or older. The average household size was 2.52 and the average family size was 3.00.

The median age in the town was 40.7 years. 24.2% of residents were under the age of 18; 6.8% were between the ages of 18 and 24; 25% were from 25 to 44; 25.4% were from 45 to 64; and 18.6% were 65 years of age or older. The gender makeup of the town was 46.2% male and 53.8% female.

=== 2000 census ===
As of the census of 2000, there were 662 people, 252 households, and 187 families living in the town. The population density was 2,255.4 inhabitants per square mile (870.8/km^{2}). There were 288 housing units at an average density of 981.2 per square mile (378.8/km^{2}). The racial makeup of the town was 97.58% White, 0.60% African American, 0.30% Asian, 0.76% from other races, and 0.76% from two or more races. Hispanic or Latino of any race were 1.66% of the population.

There were 252 households, out of which 33.7% had children under the age of 18 living with them, 62.7% were married couples living together, 8.7% had a female householder with no husband present, and 25.4% were non-families. 23.0% of all households were made up of individuals, and 9.9% had someone living alone who was 65 years of age or older. The average household size was 2.63 and the average family size was 3.05.

In the town, the population was spread out, with 28.4% under the age of 18, 6.8% from 18 to 24, 28.7% from 25 to 44, 23.9% from 45 to 64, and 12.2% who were 65 years of age or older. The median age was 36 years. For every 100 females, there were 95.9 males. For every 100 females age 18 and over, there were 94.3 males.

The median income for a household in the town was $34,750, and the median income for a family was $38,182. Males had a median income of $30,313 versus $21,875 for females. The per capita income for the town was $15,603. About 6.6% of families and 9.9% of the population were below the poverty line, including 14.4% of those under age 18 and 9.5% of those age 65 or over.

== Parks and recreation ==
In late 2020, The Tribune-Star reported that Dana is planning a downtown community center that would serve as a hub for resident services and programming for children, families, and senior adults. Dana received a $10,000 grant from the Vermillion County Community Foundation to go toward the project.

== Education ==
It is in the South Vermillion Community School Corporation. That school district operates South Vermillion High School.

== Notable people ==
- Famed World War II war correspondent Ernie Pyle was born on a tenant farm near Dana. Pyle won the Pulitzer Prize in 1944 for his Correspondence entry.
- Bert Shepard, a Major League Baseball pitcher for the Washington Senators who had lost his leg in WWII, was also born in Dana.
- American author Dana Trent moved to Dana as an infant.
- NTPA Tractor Puller Don Harness Accomplishments: His multi-engine tractor, "Loud Mouth Lime," won four NTPA Grand National titles and five Indy Super Pulls. Recognition: He was named "Modified Puller of the Year" in 1978 and inducted into the NTPA Pulling Hall of Fame in 1992.
