= North Vermillion High School =

Location
- 5555 North Falcon Drive; Cayuga, Vermillion County, Indiana 47929
- 39.970918°N 87.451674°W

Information
- Type: Public high school
- Motto: Go North Vermillion
- School district: North Vermillion Community School Corporation
- Principal: Kim Britton
- Teaching staff: 36.00 (FTE)
- Grades: 7-12
- Enrollment: 349 (2023–2024)
- Student to teacher ratio: 9.69
- Color
- Athletics conference: Wabash River Conference
- Team name: Falcons
- Website: Official Website

North Vermillion High School is a public high school located in Cayuga, Indiana. It is a part of the North Vermillion Community School Corporation. That district includes the municipalities of Cayuga, Newport, and Perrysville.

== Athletics ==
North Vermillion High School's athletic teams are the Falcons and they compete in the Wabash River Conference. The school offers a wide range of athletics including:

- Baseball
- Basketball
- Cheerleading
- Cross Country
- Football
- Golf
- Softball
- Swimming
- Track
- Volleyball
- Wrestling

=== Football ===
The 2014–2015 football team went 15–0 and won the 2014–15 IHSAA 1A Football State Championship against the Pioneer Panthers (27–26) on November 29, 2014. The 2018–2019 Falcons football team went 13–2 and made the IHSAA 1A State Championship, losing to the Pioneer Panthers (60–0).

=== Basketball ===
The 2001–2002 Women's basketball team went 25–1 overall and won the IHSAA 1A Girls Basketball State Championship against the Hebron Hawks (45–42) on March 2, 2002. The Lady Falcons were the State Runner-Up for the 2002–2003 season.

== See also ==
- List of high schools in Indiana
