= Parke Heritage High School =

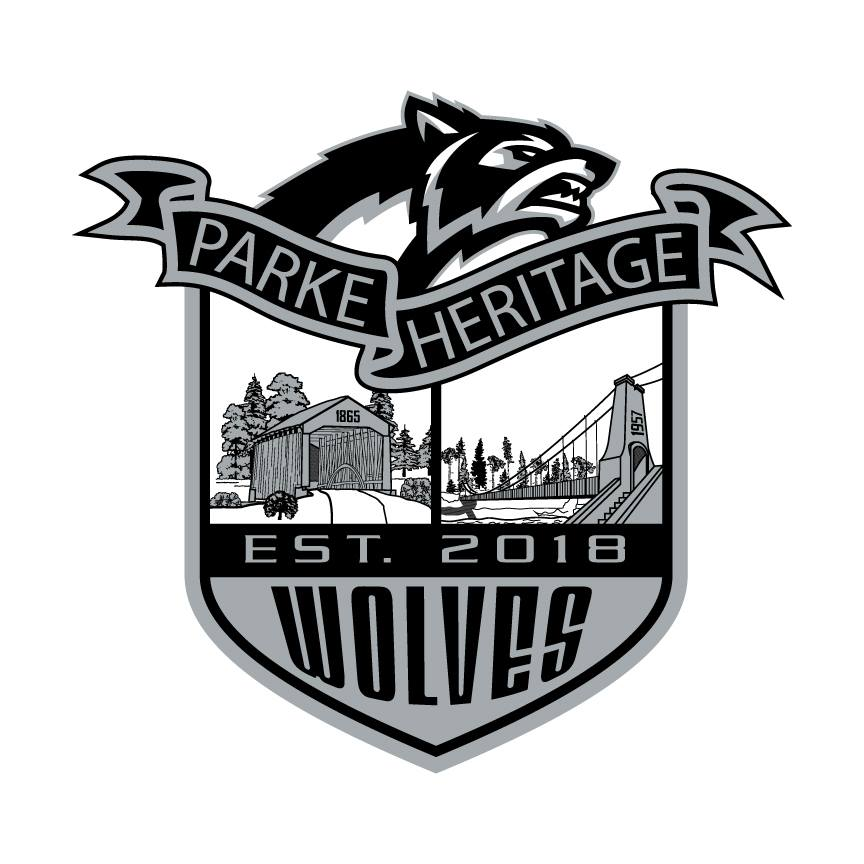

Location
- 506 Beadle Street; Rockville, Indiana 47872; United States; 39.768388°N 87.233170°W

Information
- Type: Public high school
- Motto: "For the strength of the Pack is the Wolf, and the strength of the Wolf is the Pack."
- Established: 2018
- School district: North Central Parke Community School Corporation
- Superintendent: Mike Schimpf
- Principal: Bruce Patton
- Faculty: 44.92 (FTE)
- Grades: 9–12
- Enrollment: 356 (2023–24)
- Student to teacher ratio: 7.93
- Color
- Athletics: IHSAA class 2A
- Athletics conference: Wabash River Conference
- Mascot: Thunder
- Team name: Wolves
- Website: phhs.ncp.k12.in.us

Parke Heritage High School is a public high school in Rockville, Indiana, that is a part of the North Central Parke Community School Corporation. It opened in the 2018–19 school year.

== About ==
Parke Heritage High School was created from the consolidation of former high schools in North Central Parke County: Rockville Junior-Senior High School and Turkey Run High School.

The school's fight song was composed by Ashley Brown, who taught at Parke Heritage for two years. She combined elements of the two schools' songs plus other elements.

== Campus ==
Parke Heritage High School uses the campus of the former Rockville Junior-Senior High School. There is a football field located on the school's campus. The baseball/softball fields are not on the school's campus. There is also a track around the football field that is used on multiple occasions.

== Curriculum ==
The Parke Heritage Wolves have a spell bowl team, a math bowl team, and many other academic teams. Their spell bowl team went to state on their inaugural year. Parke Heritage High also has a band and a choir, whose members participate in Solo and Ensemble annually. Parke Heritage is a member of the Rural Early College Network, offering dual-credit classes to students.

== Athletics ==
The Parke Heritage Wolves compete in 9 varsity sports including baseball, basketball, cheerleading, cross country, football, golf, softball, track & field, tennis, and volleyball. The teams retained membership in Rockville and Turkey Run's athletic conference, the Wabash River Conference.

== IHSAA Tournament Success ==
In the 2020-2021 Boys Basketball season, the wolves were Class 2A runners up. Parke Heritage finished with a 27-4 record. The Wolves' football team conquered their sectional in the 2021 season. In the 2022 Baseball season, the wolves were sectional champions. They were also regional champions in Boys Basketball in the 2022–2023, 2023–2024, and 2024–2025 seasons. The Wolves' volleyball team also advanced to regionals in their 2024 season. In 2023, the girls varsity golf team advanced to the regional. The boys golf team won their sectional in 2024. The girls varsity basketball team won their sectional in the 2023–2024 season. They also won their regional in the 2024–2025 season. Along with all of these accomplishments, they have achieved several conference championships and had several individual athletes advance to regionals and semi-state in sports such as wrestling, golf, tennis, track, and cross country.

== See also ==
- List of high schools in Indiana

Rockville Junior-Senior High School (Indiana)

Turkey Run High School
