= Riverton Parke Junior-Senior High School =

School in Montezuma, Indiana, United States

Riverton Parke Jr./Sr. High School

Location
- 4907 South Coxville Road; Montezuma, Parke County, Indiana 47862; United States; 39.6975°N 87.3229°W

Information
- Type: Public high school
- Established: 1986
- School district: Southwest Parke Community School Corporation
- Superintendent: Phil Harrison
- CEEB code: 152390
- Principal: Kyle Kersey
- Teaching staff: 45.00(FTE)
- Grades: 7–12
- Enrollment: 485 (2023-2024)
- Average class size: 40
- Student to teacher ratio: 10.78
- Color
- Song: Notre Dame Victory March
- Athletics: IHSAA class 1A
- Athletics conference: Wabash River Conference
- Team name: Panthers
- Website: www.swparke.k12.in.us/o/jr-sr-high-school

Riverton Parke Jr./Sr. High School is a public high school in Montezuma, Indiana, United States.

== About ==
Riverton Parke Junior-Senior High School was created from the consolidation of former high schools in western and southern Parke County, Indiana: Rosedale High School, Mecca High School, Bridgeton High School, and Montezuma High School.

== Campus ==
The school is surrounded by forests and fields. There is a football field, softball field, and baseball field, along with many hiking paths around the school.

== Curriculum ==
The Panthers have a spell bowl team, a math bowl team, and many other academic teams. The spell bowl team has been successful, with multiple visits to the State Championships. In 2018, the Panthers captured the State Championship on the campus of Purdue University.

== Athletics ==
The Riverton Parke Panthers compete in seven varsity sports, including baseball, basketball, bowling, cheerleading, cross country, football, track & field, and volleyball. They are mostly known for their softball team, which has won more than 12 sectional titles and, in 2010, a state title in Class A.

== See also ==
- List of high schools in Indiana
