= Indiana high school football champions – smaller schools =

Football league for high school

In 1973, the Indiana High School Athletic Association (IHSAA) established a three class state playoff system in football. In 1983, the tournament split into four classes, in 1985 into a five class system, and in 2013 into a six class system, with 6A for big schools and 1A for the smallest schools. This page represents all smaller school class tournament champions.

== Indiana Class 6A State Football Champions ==
For all large school football champions since 1920 see Indiana Big School Football Champions.

== Indiana Class 5A State Football Champions ==
2012 – Lawrence Central
2013 – Indianapolis Cathedral (11)
2014 – Indianapolis Cathedral (12)
2015 – Fort Wayne Snider (2)*
2016 – Westfield
2017 – Columbus East (3)*
2018 – New Palestine (2)
2019 – New Palestine (3)
2020 – Indianapolis Cathedral (13)
2021 – Indianapolis Cathedral (14)
2022 – Valparaiso (2)
2023 – Fort Wayne Snider (3)*
2024 - Decatur Central
2025 - New Palestine (5)

For 1985–2012 see Indiana Big School Football Champions. Some multiple champion listings occur across classes. *Fort Wayne Snider won a big school title in 1992. Columbus East won a big school title in 1979

== Indiana Class 4A State Football Champions ==
1985 - Brownsburg (2)
1986 - DeKalb
1987 - Hobart
1988 - Goshen (2)
1989 - Hobart (2)
1990 - Franklin Central
1991 - Hobart (3)
1992 - Harrison (West Lafayette)
1993 - Hobart (4)
1994 - East Central
1995 - Fort Wayne Wayne
1996 - Indianapolis Cathedral (3)
1997 - Griffith
1998 - Indianapolis Cathedral (4)
1999 - Indianapolis Cathedral (5)
2000 - East Noble
2001 - Jasper
2002 - Indianapolis Roncalli (6)
2003 - Indianapolis Roncalli (7)
2004 - Indianapolis Roncalli (8)
2005 - Lowell
2006 - Indianapolis Cathedral (6)
2007 - Evansville Reitz (6)*
2008 - Indianapolis Cathedral (7)
2009 - Evansville Reitz (7)*
2010 - Indianapolis Cathedral (8)
2011 - Indianapolis Cathedral (9)
2012 - Indianapolis Cathedral (10)
2013 - Columbus East (2)*
2014 - New Palestine
2015 - Fort Wayne Bishop Dwenger (4)
2016 - Indianapolis Roncalli (9)
2017 - East Central (2)
2018 - Fort Wayne Bishop Dwenger (5)
2019 - Evansville Memorial
2020 - Indianapolis Roncalli (10)
2021 - Mt. Vernon
2022 - East Central (3)
2023 - East Central (4)
2024 - New Palestine (4)
2025 - Fort Wayne Bishop Dwenger (6)

For 1983-84 see Indiana Big School Football Champions. Some multiple champion listings occur across classes. *Evansville Reitz won big school state championships in 1948, '57, '60, '61, and '71. Columbus East won a big school title in 1979

== Indiana Class 3A State Football Champions ==
1983 - Fort Wayne Bishop Dwenger
1984 - Brownsburg
1985 - Indianapolis Roncalli
1986 - Indianapolis Cathedral
1987 - Zionsville
1988 - Indianapolis Roncalli (2)
1989 - Hammond Bishop Noll (2)*
1990 - Fort Wayne Bishop Dwenger (2)
1991 - Fort Wayne Bishop Dwenger (3)
1992 - Indianapolis Cathedral (2)
1993 - Indianapolis Roncalli (3)
1994 - Indianapolis Roncalli (4)
1995 - South Bend St. Joseph's (2)*
1996 - Zionsville (2)
1997 - Indianapolis Bishop Chatard (3)
1998 - Indianapolis Bishop Chatard (4)
1999 - Indianapolis Roncalli (5)
2000 - Heritage Hills
2001 - Indianapolis Bishop Chatard (5)
2002 - Indianapolis Bishop Chatard (6)
2003 - Indianapolis Bishop Chatard (7)
2004 - Merrillville Andrean
2005 - NorthWood
2006 - Indianapolis Bishop Chatard (8)
2007 - Indianapolis Bishop Chatard (9)
2008 - Bellmont
2009 - West Lafayette (2)
2010 - Indianapolis Bishop Chatard (10)
2011 - Indianapolis Bishop Chatard (11)
2012 - Indianapolis Bishop Chatard (12)
2013 - Merrillville Andrean (2)
2014 - Tri-West (4)
2015 - Indianapolis Bishop Chatard (13)
2016 - Fort Wayne Concordia
2017 - Evansville Memorial
2018 - West Lafayette (3)
2019 - Indianapolis Bishop Chatard (14)
2020 - Indianapolis Bishop Chatard (15)
2021 - Gibson Southern
2022 - Indianapolis Bishop Chatard (16)
2023 - Indianapolis Bishop Chatard (17)
2024 - Heritage Hills (2)
2025 - Cascade

For 1973-82 see Indiana Big School Football Champions. Some multiple champion listings occur across classifications. *South Bend St. Joseph won a big school state championship in 1964, Hammond Bishop Noll in 1951.

== Indiana Class 2A State Football Champions ==
Source: 1973 - Greenfield-Central
1974 - Blackford
1975 - Mishawaka Marian (2)
1976 - Mishawaka Marian (3)
1977 - Plymouth
1978 - Goshen
1979 - Blackford (2)
1980 - Franklin Central
1981 - Franklin Central (2)
1982 - Franklin Central (3)
1983 - Indianapolis Chatard
1984 - Indianapolis Chatard (2)
1985 - Fort Wayne Luers
1986 - Whitko
1987 - Rochester
1988 - Western Boone
1989 - Fort Wayne Luers (2)
1990 - Indianapolis Scecina
1991 - Indianapolis Scecina (2)
1992 - Fort Wayne Luers (3)
1993 - West Lafayette
1994 - Bremen (2)
1995 - North Montgomery
1996 - North Montgomery (2)
1997 - Jimtown (2)
1998 - Jimtown (3)
1999 - Fort Wayne Luers (4)
2000 - Evansville Mater Dei
2001 - Fort Wayne Luers (5)
2002 - Fort Wayne Luers (6)
2003 - Tri-West (2)
2004 - Tri-West (3)
2005 - Jimtown (4)
2006 - Fort Wayne Harding
2007 - Fort Wayne Luers (7)
2008 - Heritage Christian
2009 - Fort Wayne Luers (8)
2010 - Fort Wayne Luers (9)
2011 - Fort Wayne Luers (10)
2012 - Fort Wayne Luers (11)
2013 - Indianapolis Ritter (4)
2014 - Rensselaer Central
2015 - Monrovia
2016 - Indianapolis Ritter (5)
2017 - Southridge
2018 - Western Boone (2)
2019 - Western Boone (3)
2020 - Western Boone (4)
2021 - Merrillville Andrean (3)
2022 - Evansville Mater Dei (2)
2023 - Fort Wayne Luers (12)
2024 - Adams Central (2)
2025 - Merrillville Andrean (4)

Some multiple champion listings occur across classifications.

== Indiana Class 1A State Football Champions ==
1973 - Mishawaka Marian
1974 - Garrett
1975 - Lawrenceburg
1976 - Lafayette Central Catholic
1977 - Indianapolis Ritter
1978 - Lawrenceburg (2)
1979 - Tippecanoe Valley
1980 - Sheridan
1981 - Hamilton Southeastern
1982 - Oak Hill
1983 - Fountain Central
1984 - Sheridan (2)
1985 - Eastern Hancock
1986 - South Putnam
1987 - Sheridan (3)
1988 - Sheridan (4)
1989 - Bremen
1990 - South Decatur
1991 - Jimtown
1992 - Sheridan (5)
1993 - North Miami
1994 - North White
1995 - (Flora) Carroll
1996 - Tri-West
1997 - Pioneer
1998 - Sheridan (6)
1999 - Lafayette Central Catholic (2)
2000 - Adams Central
2001 - Southern Wells
2002 - Southwood
2003 - Indianapolis Ritter (2)
2004 - Seeger
2005 - Sheridan (7)
2006 - Sheridan (8)
2007 - Sheridan (9)
2008 - Indianapolis Ritter (3)
2009 - Lafayette Central Catholic (3)
2010 - Lafayette Central Catholic (4)
2011 - Lafayette Central Catholic (5)
2012 - Lafayette Central Catholic (6)
2013 - Tri-Central
2014 - North Vermillion
2015 - Lafayette Central Catholic (7)
2016 - Linton-Stockton
2017 - Pioneer (2)
2018 - Pioneer (3)
2019 - Lafayette Central Catholic (8)
2020 - Indianapolis Covenant Christian
2021 - Indianapolis Lutheran
2022 - Indianapolis Lutheran (2)
2023 - Indianapolis Lutheran (3)
2024 - Providence
2025 - South Putnam (2)

Some multiple champion listings occur across classifications.
