= Rockville Junior-Senior High School (Indiana) =

Location
- 506 Beadle Street; Rockville, Parke County, Indiana 47872; United States
- Coordinates: 39.768388°N 87.233170°W

Information
- Type: Public high school
- Principal: Dwight Ashley
- Faculty: 29 FTE
- Grades: 7-12
- Enrollment: 348 (2014-15)
- Color
- Athletics conference: Wabash River Conference
- Team name: Rox
- Website: Official Website

Rockville Junior-Senior High School was a public high school located in Rockville, Indiana. It closed after 2017–18 school year, consolidated into Parke Heritage High School.

== See also ==
- List of high schools in Indiana
