= Cayuga, Indiana =

- Town
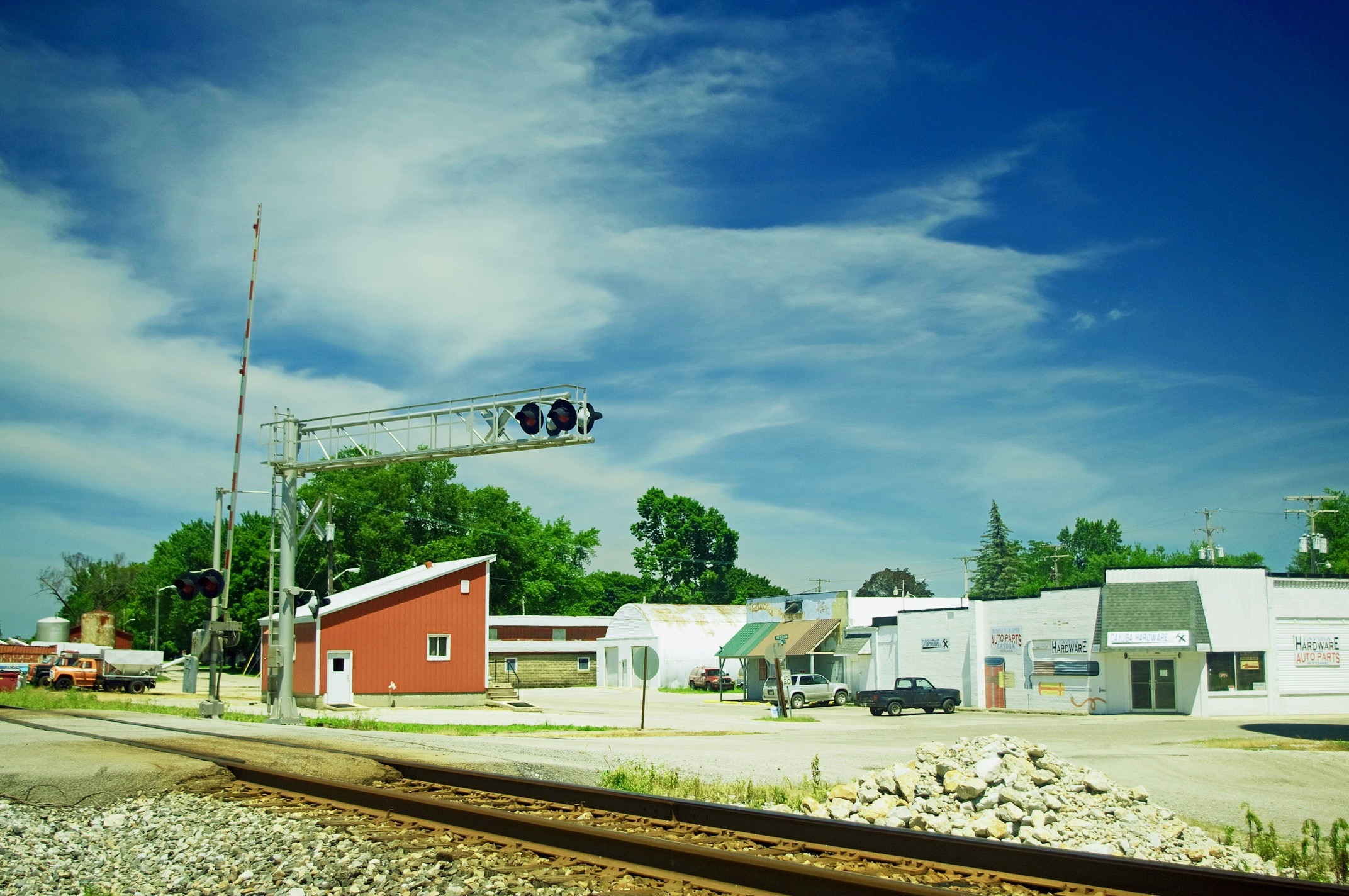
- Businesses along Patterson Street

- Location of Cayuga in Vermillion County, Indiana.

- Map of Cayuga
- Coordinates: 39°56′50″N 87°27′53″W
- Country: United States
- State: Indiana
- County: Vermillion
- Township: Eugene
- Established: 1827

Area
  - Total: 1.01 sq mi (2.62 km^{2})
  - Land: 1.01 sq mi (2.62 km^{2})
  - Water: 0 sq mi (0.00 km^{2})
- Elevation: 505 ft (154 m)

Population (2020)
  - Total: 952
  - Density: 939.4/sq mi (362.69/km^{2})
- Time zone: UTC-5 (EST)
  - Summer (DST): UTC-5 (EST)
- ZIP code: 47928
- Area code: 765
- FIPS code: 18-10954
- GNIS feature ID: 2396632
- Website: townofcayuga.com

Cayuga is a town in Eugene Township, Vermillion County, in the U.S. state of Indiana. The population was 952 at the 2020 census.

== History ==
When the town was laid out on September 20, 1827, it was called Eugene Station, though it was also called Osonimon after an Indian chief of that name. It was later renamed after the village of Cayuga and Cayuga Lake in the state of New York; an early settler named John Groenendyke had originally come from Cayuga County, New York, and moved to Vigo County in 1818, then in 1819 moved to the area that later became Vermillion County. The name is based on the Iroquois term Gwa-u-geh, meaning "the place of taking out" (in terms of a portage). Local legend attributes the name to the sound made by the horn of a Ford Model T. The town was incorporated around 1891.

The Cayuga post office has been in operation since 1886.

== Geography ==
Cayuga is located at the intersection of Indiana State Road 63 and Indiana State Road 234, in the northern half of the county, near the confluence of the Vermillion and Wabash rivers.

According to the 2010 census, Cayuga has a total area of 1.01 square miles (2.62 km^{2}), all land.

== Demographics ==
Historical population
Census	Pop.	Note	%±
1900	832		—
1910	911		9.5%
1920	933		2.4%
1930	968		3.8%
1940	1,126		16.3%
1950	1,022		−9.2%
1960	904		−11.5%
1970	1,090		20.6%
1980	1,258		15.4%
1990	1,083		−13.9%
2000	1,109		2.4%
2010	1,162		4.8%
2020	952		−18.1%
U.S. Decennial Census

=== 2010 census ===
As of the census of 2010, there were 1,162 people, 475 households, and 329 families living in the town. The population density was 1,150.5 inhabitants per square mile (444.2/km^{2}). There were 523 housing units at an average density of 517.8 per square mile (199.9/km^{2}). The racial makeup of the town was 97.8% White, 0.2% African American, 0.5% Native American, 0.1% Asian, 0.3% from other races, and 1.2% from two or more races. Hispanic or Latino of any race were 0.5% of the population.

There were 475 households, of which 29.9% had children under the age of 18 living with them, 50.5% were married couples living together, 13.7% had a female householder with no husband present, 5.1% had a male householder with no wife present, and 30.7% were non-families. 26.7% of all households were made up of individuals, and 14.9% had someone living alone who was 65 years of age or older. The average household size was 2.45 and the average family size was 2.89.

The median age in the town was 43.2 years. 22.5% of residents were under the age of 18; 8.4% were between the ages of 18 and 24; 21.4% were from 25 to 44; 30.1% were from 45 to 64; and 17.6% were 65 years of age or older. The gender makeup of the town was 48.2% male and 51.8% female.

=== 2000 census ===
As of the census of 2000, there were 1,109 people, 466 households, and 313 families living in the town. The population density was 1,106.8 inhabitants per square mile (427.3/km^{2}). There were 517 housing units at an average density of 516.0 per square mile (199.2/km^{2}). The racial makeup of the town was 98.38% White, 0.09% African American, 0.99% Native American, and 0.54% from two or more races. Hispanic or Latino of any race were 0.90% of the population.

There were 466 households, out of which 29.6% had children under the age of 18 living with them, 53.9% were married couples living together, 8.8% had a female householder with no husband present, and 32.8% were non-families. 30.3% of all households were made up of individuals, and 19.1% had someone living alone who was 65 years of age or older. The average household size was 2.38 and the average family size was 2.93.

In the town, the population was spread out, with 24.1% under the age of 18, 9.5% from 18 to 24, 25.5% from 25 to 44, 24.4% from 45 to 64, and 16.5% who were 65 years of age or older. The median age was 38 years. For every 100 females, there were 91.2 males. For every 100 females age 18 and over, there were 88.8 males.

The median income for a household in the town was $31,053, and the median income for a family was $40,536. Males had a median income of $30,179 versus $19,583 for females. The per capita income for the town was $16,042. About 8.5% of families and 9.9% of the population were below the poverty line, including 14.1% of those under age 18 and 11.2% of those age 65 or over

== Industry ==
- Cayuga Generating Station
- Colonial Brick Corporation

== Education ==
It is in the North Vermillion Community School Corporation. That school district operates North Vermillion High School.
