= Stanley Motor Carriage Company =

American manufacturer of steam cars

- Industry: Automobile
- Founded: 1902 (first vehicle produced 1897)
- Defunct: 1924
- Fate: Sold and dissolved
- Headquarters: Maple Street in Watertown, MA, United States
- Key people: Francis Edgar Stanley and Freelan O. Stanley
- Products: Vehicles

The Stanley Motor Carriage Company was an American manufacturer of steam cars that operated from 1902 to 1924, going defunct after it failed to adapt to competition from rapidly improving internal combustion engine vehicles. The cars made by the company were colloquially called Stanley Steamers although several different models were produced.

== Early history ==
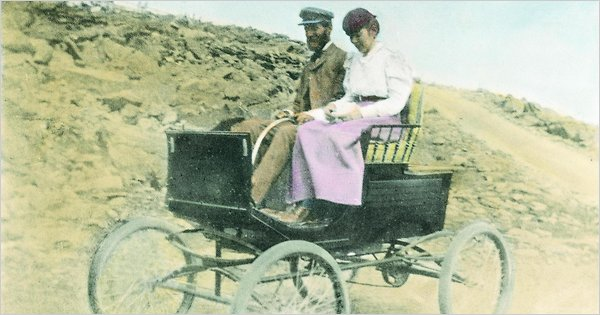
F. O. Stanley and his wife Flora drove to the top of Mount Washington in New Hampshire in 1899 to generate publicity for their firm

Twins Francis E. Stanley (1849–1918) and Freelan O. Stanley (1849–1940) founded the company, after selling their photographic dry plate business to Eastman Kodak. They made their first car in 1897. During 1898 and 1899, they produced and sold over 200 cars, more than any other U.S. maker.

In 1899, Freelan and his wife Flora drove one of their cars to the top of 6,288.2 ft (1,916.6 m) Mount Washington in New Hampshire, the highest peak in the northeastern United States. The ascent took more than two hours and was notable as being the first time a car had climbed the 7.6 mi (12.2 km) Mount Washington Carriage Road. The Stanleys later sold the rights to this early design to Locomobile. In 1902, they formed their own Stanley Motor Carriage Company.

== Specifications and design ==
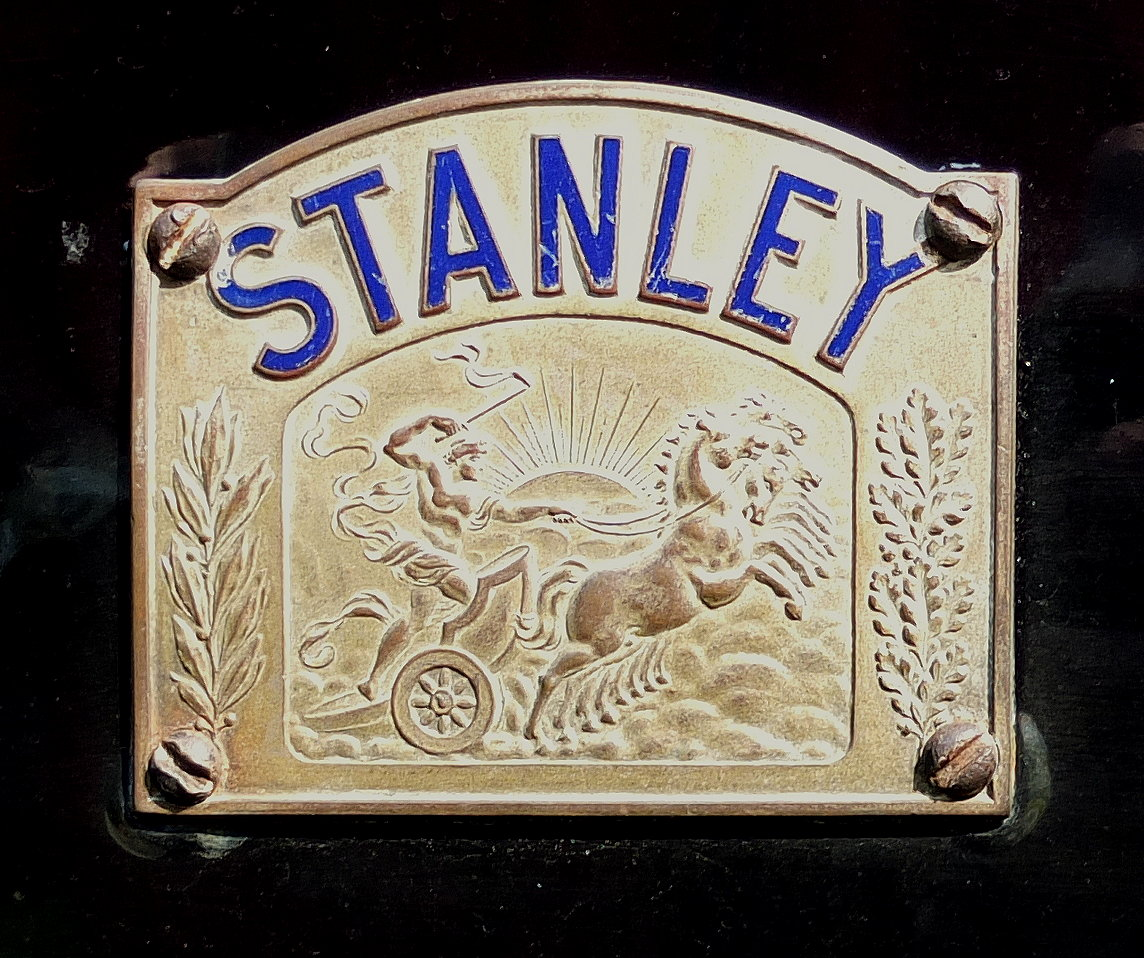
Stanley logo, 1919

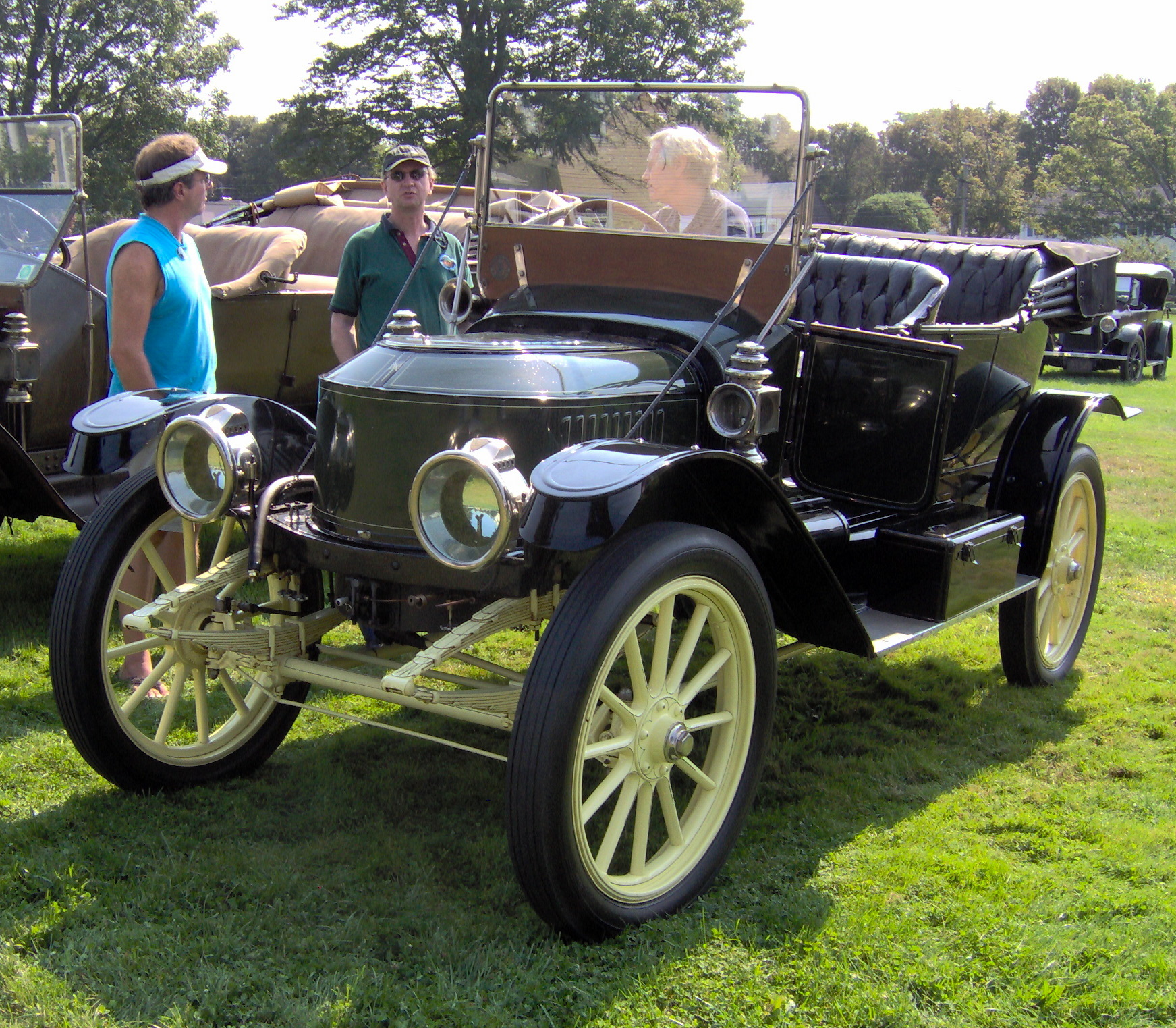
1912 Stanley steam car

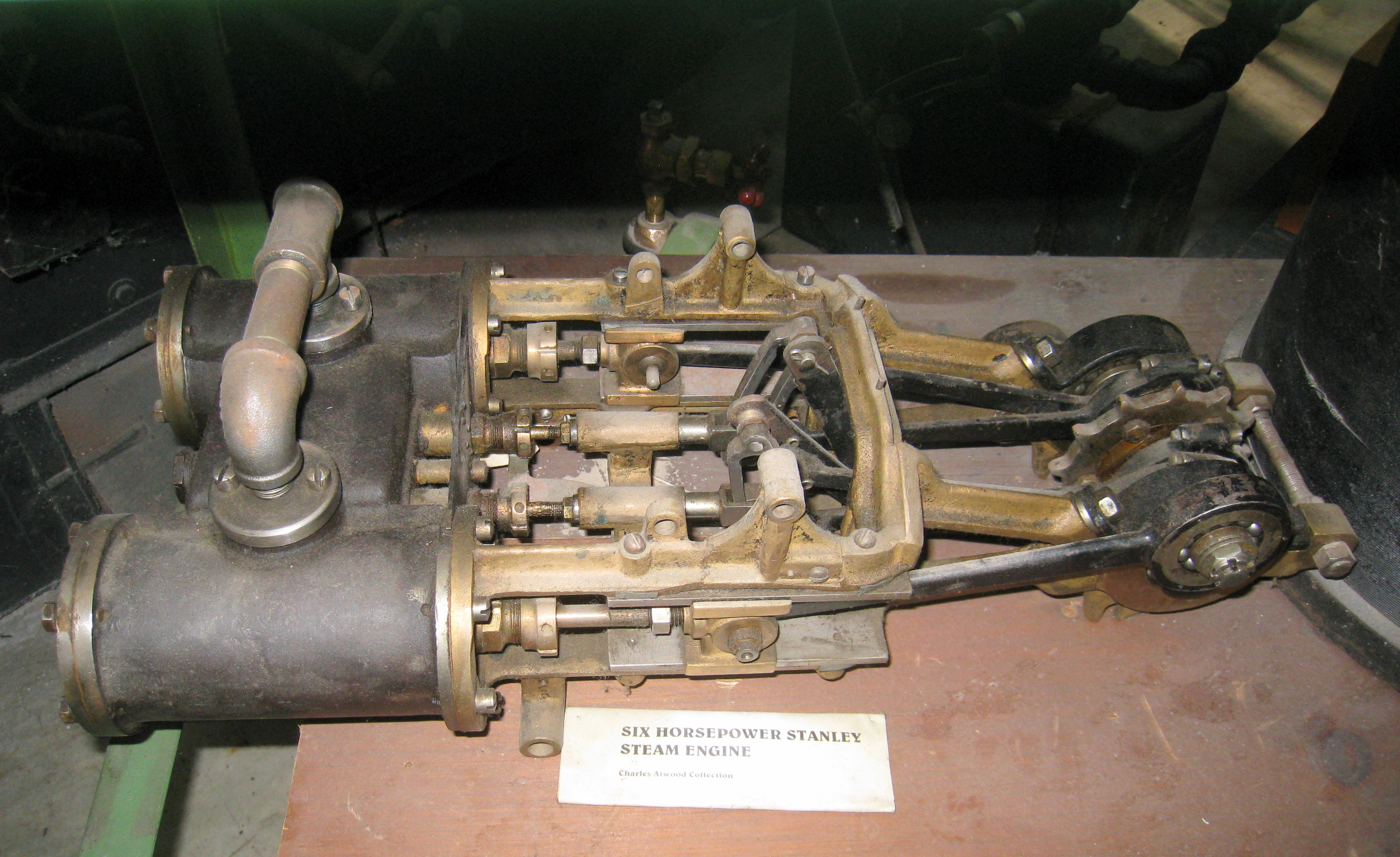
6hp Stanley steam car engine

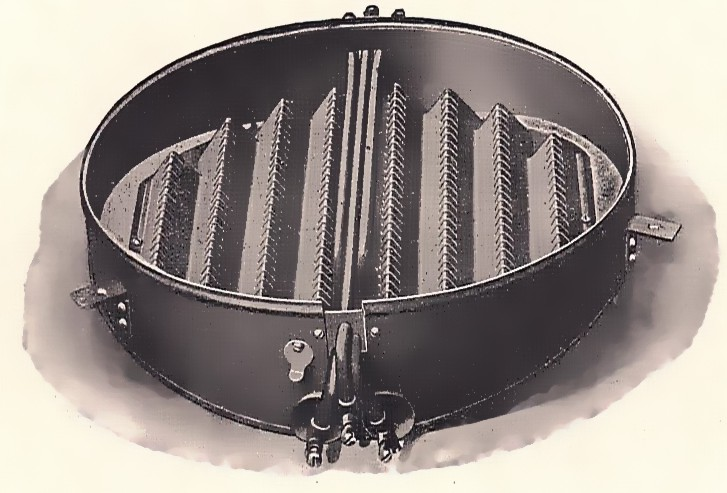
Gasoline burner for a Stanley steam car boiler

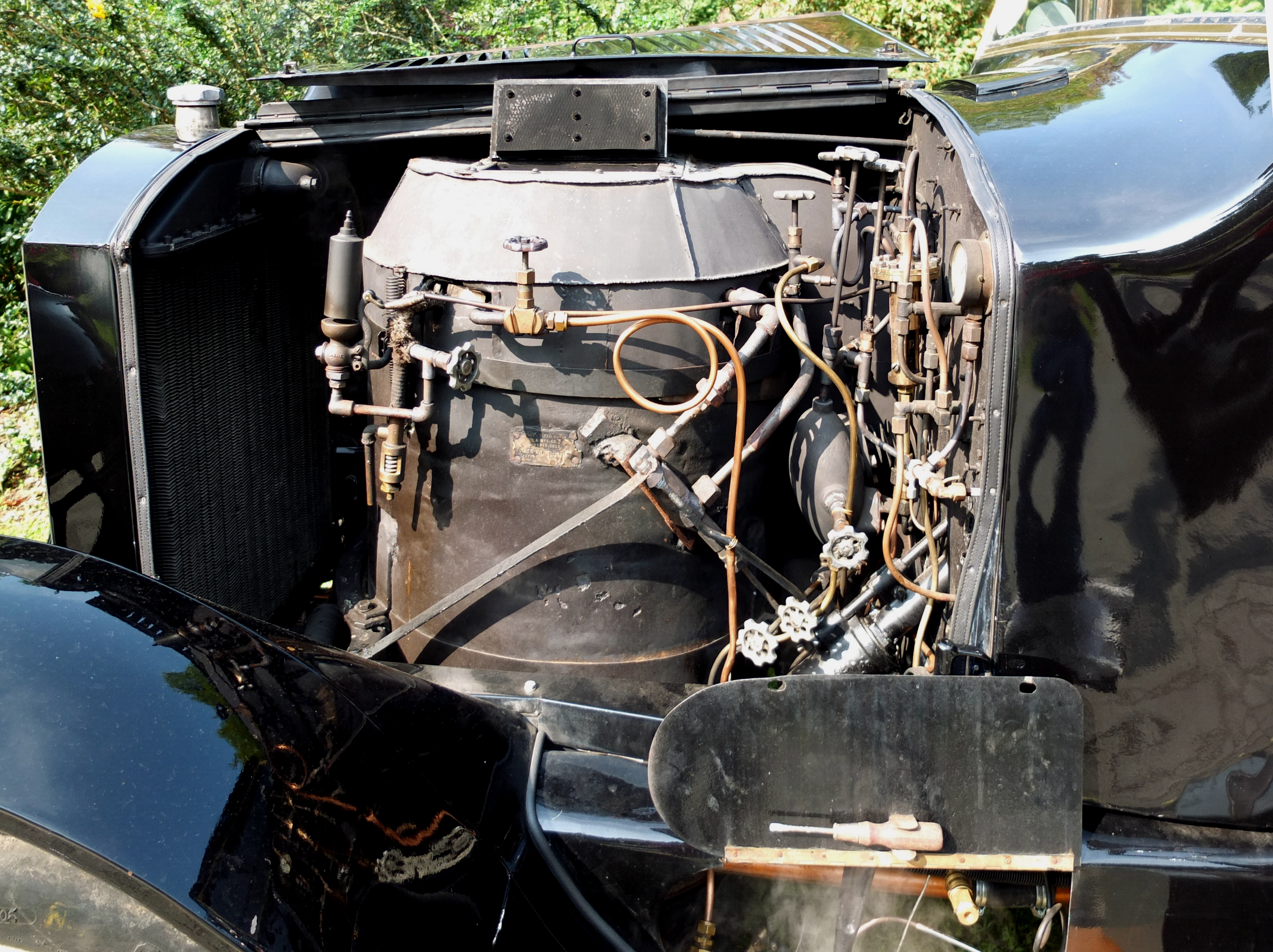
Steam generator of a 1919 Stanley Steamer

Early Stanley cars had light wooden bodies mounted on wooden "perch poles" with full-elliptic leaf springs. Steam was generated in a vertical fire-tube boiler mounted beneath the seat above a vaporizing gasoline (later kerosene) burner. The boiler was reinforced by several layers of piano wire wound around it, which gave it a strong but relatively lightweight shell. In early models, the vertical fire-tubes were made of copper and were expanded into holes in the upper and lower crown sheets. In later models, the installation of a condenser caused oil-fouling in the expansion joints, and welded steel fire-tubes had to be used. The boilers were reasonably safe since they were fitted with safety valves. Even if these failed, any dangerous over pressure would rupture one of the joints long before the boiler shell itself could burst. The resulting leakage would relieve the boiler pressure and douse the burner with very little risk to the passenger. There is not a single documented incident of a Stanley boiler exploding.

The engine had two simple-expansion double-acting cylinders side by side, equipped with slide-valves. Drive was transmitted directly by the crankshaft via achain to a rear-mounted differential. Owners often modified their Locomobiles by adding third-party accessories, including improved lubricators, condensers, and devices which eased the laborious starting procedure.

To overcome patent difficulties with the design they had sold to Locomobile, the Stanley brothers developed a new model with twin-cylinder engines geared directly to the rear axle. Later models had aluminium coachwork that resembled the internal combustion cars of the time, but they retained steam-car features by having no transmission, clutch, or driveshaft. They also had a fully sprung tubular steel frame.

When they later moved the steam boiler to the front of the vehicle, the owners dubbed it the "coffin nose". The compact engine ran at considerable steam pressure, with the 10-horsepower (7.5 kW) boiler described in 1912 as having the safety valve set at 650 pounds per square inch (4.5 MPa), with the burner set to automatically cut back when pressure reached 500 pounds per square inch (3.4 MPa). The twin-cylinder steam engines made extensive use of ball bearings. A version with a 3 1/4-inch (83 mm) x 4 1/4-inch (108 mm) [bore and stroke]] produced 10 hp (7.5 kW), and another with a 4-inch (102 mm) x 5-inch (127 mm) bore and stroke produced 20 horsepower (15 kW). In order to improve range, condensers were added from 1915.

A Stanley Steamer set the world record for the fastest mile in an automobile (28.2 seconds) in 1906. This record (127 mph or 204 km/h) was not broken by any automobile until 1911, although Glen Curtiss beat the land speed record in 1907 with a V-8-powered motorcycle at 136 mph (219 km/h). The record for steam-powered automobiles was not broken until 2009 by Charles Burnett III driving Inspiration.

Production rose to 519 cars in 1917.

The Stanley Steamer was sometimes nicknamed "The Flying Teapot". At least one Stanley Steamer found its way to Castle Hill, New South Wales, Australia, where it was driven in the late 1920s.

== Overview of production figures ==
Year	Production
1897	(1)
1898	(100)
1899	(100)
1900	30
1901	80
1902	170
1903	300
1904	550
1905	610
1906	640
1907	775
1908	784
1909	613
1910	670
1911	535
1912	566
1913	475
1914	527
1915	403
1916	353
1917	519
1918	498
1919	499
1920	255
1921	310
1922	465
1923	181
1924	102
Sum	10,910

== Obsolescence ==
During the mid to late 1910s, the improved fuel efficiency and power delivery of internal combustion engines and the use of electric starters instead of cranks, which had been notorious for causing injury, made the internal combustion automobile more popular than the more expensive steam car. The Stanley company responded with advertising campaigns aimed at discrediting the "internal explosion engine." One Stanley advertising slogan to that end was "Power – Correctly Generated, Correctly Controlled, Correctly Applied to the Rear Axle." These were early examples of a "fear, uncertainty and doubt" ad campaign, since their aim was not to convince buyers of the advantages of the Stanley Steamer but to suggest that internal combustion automobiles could explode.

== Sale and closure ==
Francis died in 1918 when he steered his car off the road into a woodpile while attempting to avoid farm wagons travelling side by side. After his death, Freelan sold his interests to Prescott Warren. The company suffered a period of decline and technological stagnation. Production specifications show that no model with a power output of more than 20 hp (15 kW) was produced after 1918. Better cars were now available at much lower cost. For example, a 1924 Stanley 740D sedan cost $3,950, compared with less than $500 for a Ford Model T. The widespread use of electric starters in internal combustion cars, beginning in 1912, eroded the remaining technological advantages of the steam car.

The smaller scale of merchandising, a lack of effective advertising, and the general desire of motorists for higher speeds and faster starting than offered by Stanley vehicles were the primary causes of the company's demise. The factory closed permanently in 1924.

== In popular culture ==
In the 1935 MGM film Ah, Wilderness!, Lionel Barrymore owns a Stanley Steamer. His character claims to have paid $5 for it. A song titled "The Stanley Steamer" appears in the 1948 film Summer Holiday (itself a remake of the above Ah, Wilderness) starring Mickey Rooney and Gloria DeHaven. The number, written by Harry Warren with lyrics by Ralph Blane, features an extended musical sequence with what appears to be a fairly early yellow 10 HP model. Stanley from Cars, Cars 2, and the Cars Toons short "Time Travel Mater" is a Stanley Steamer. Another Stanley Steamer appears in the 1965 film The Great Race starring Jack Lemmon and Tony Curtis, with Natalie Wood as the driver of the car. And a Stanley Steamer appears in the 2003 film Seabiscuit.

Boston Red Sox pitcher Bob Stanley was nicknamed "Stanley Steamer".

== Gallery ==
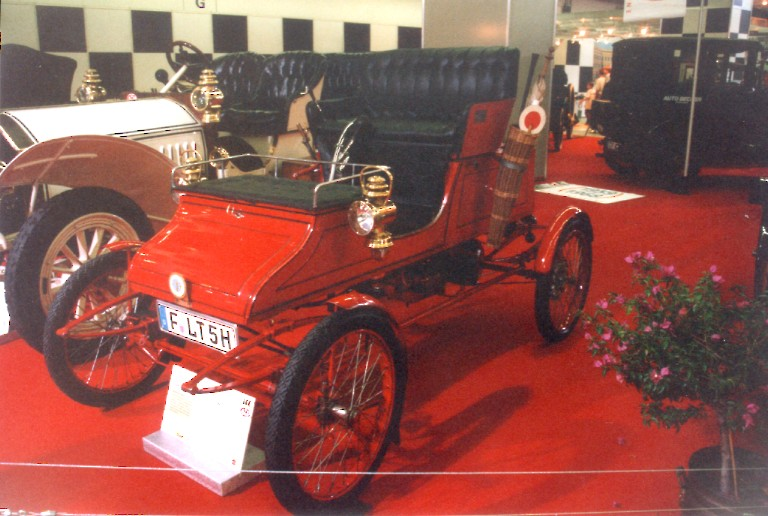
1900–06 Stanley Steamer

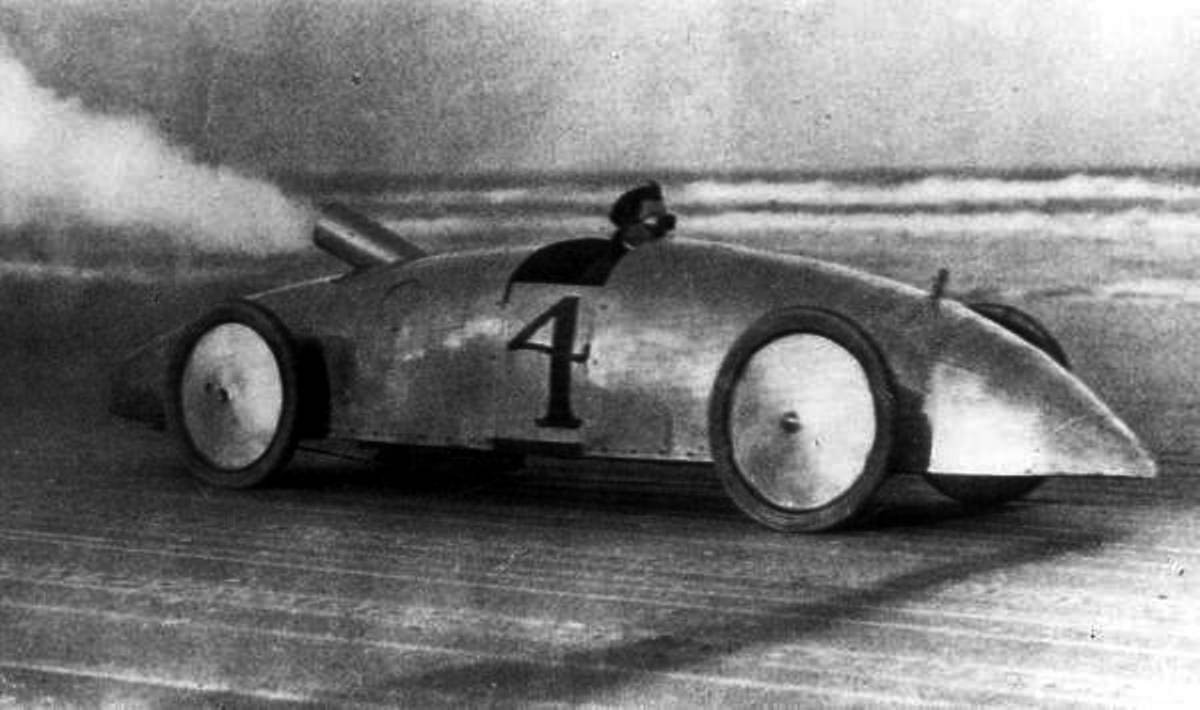
A Stanley Steamer in 1903 setting a record mile at the Daytona Beach and Road Course

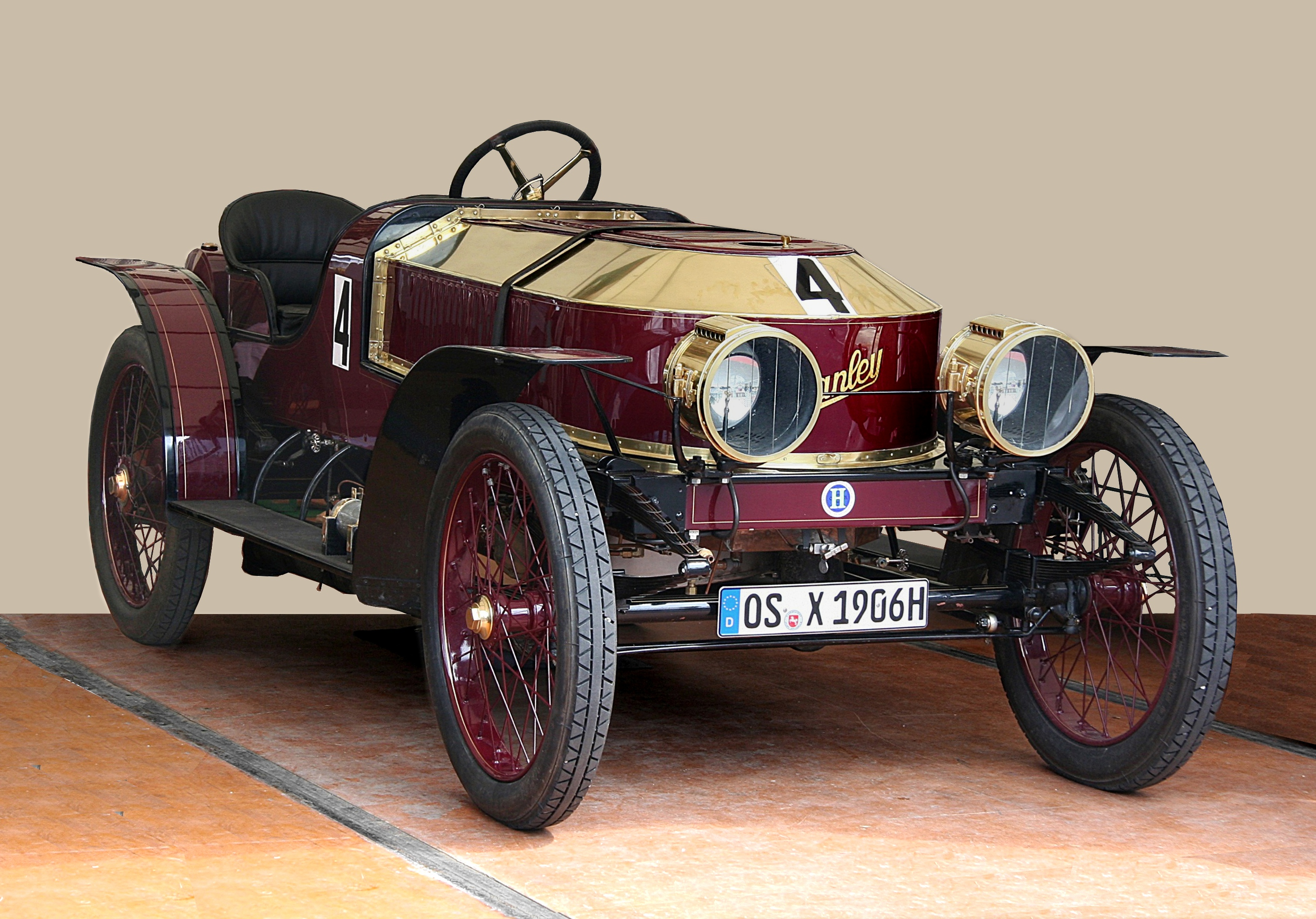
Stanley Gentleman's Speedy Runabout, 1906

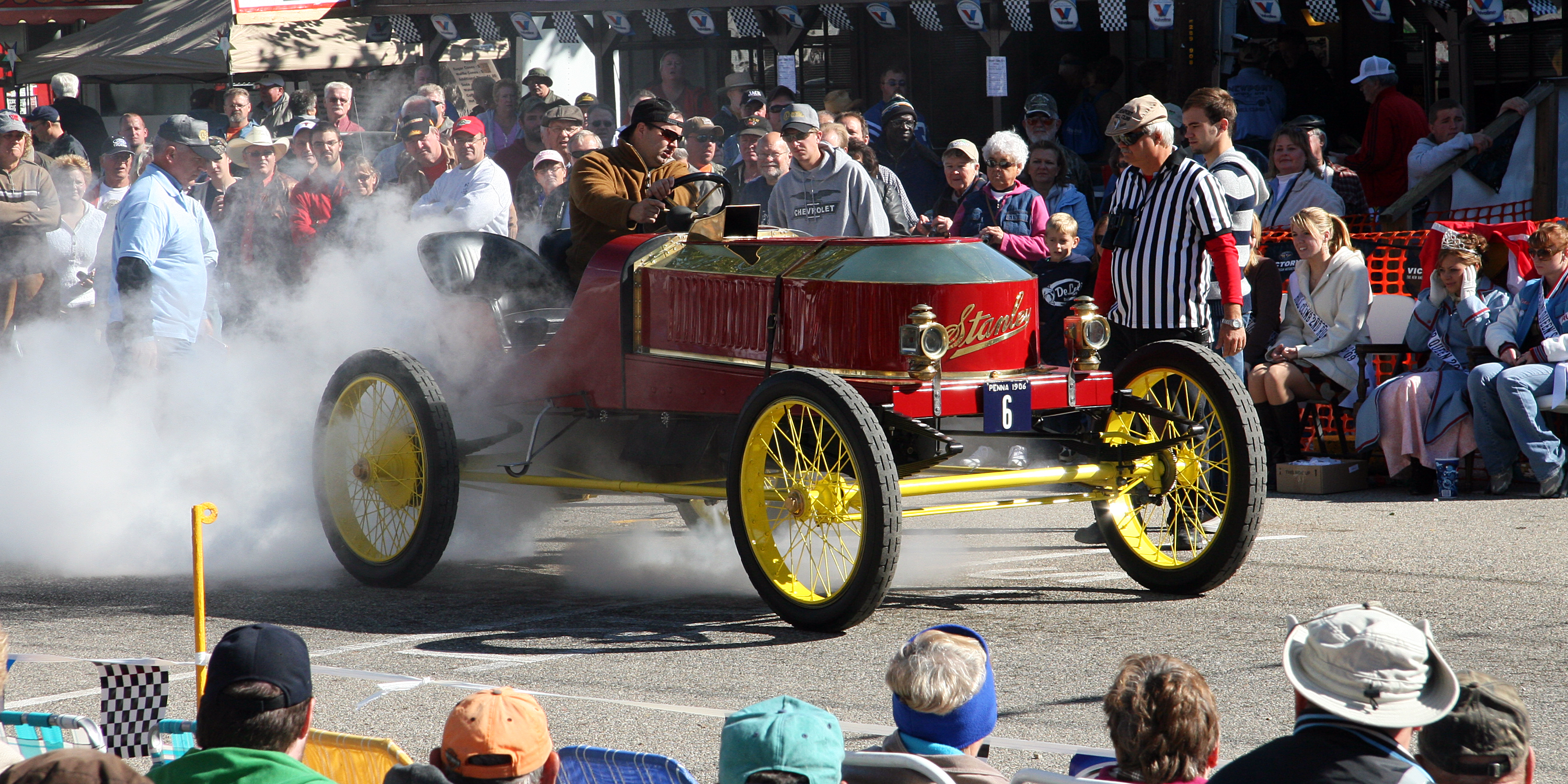
A 1908 Stanley leaving the starting line at the Newport Antique Auto Hill Climb

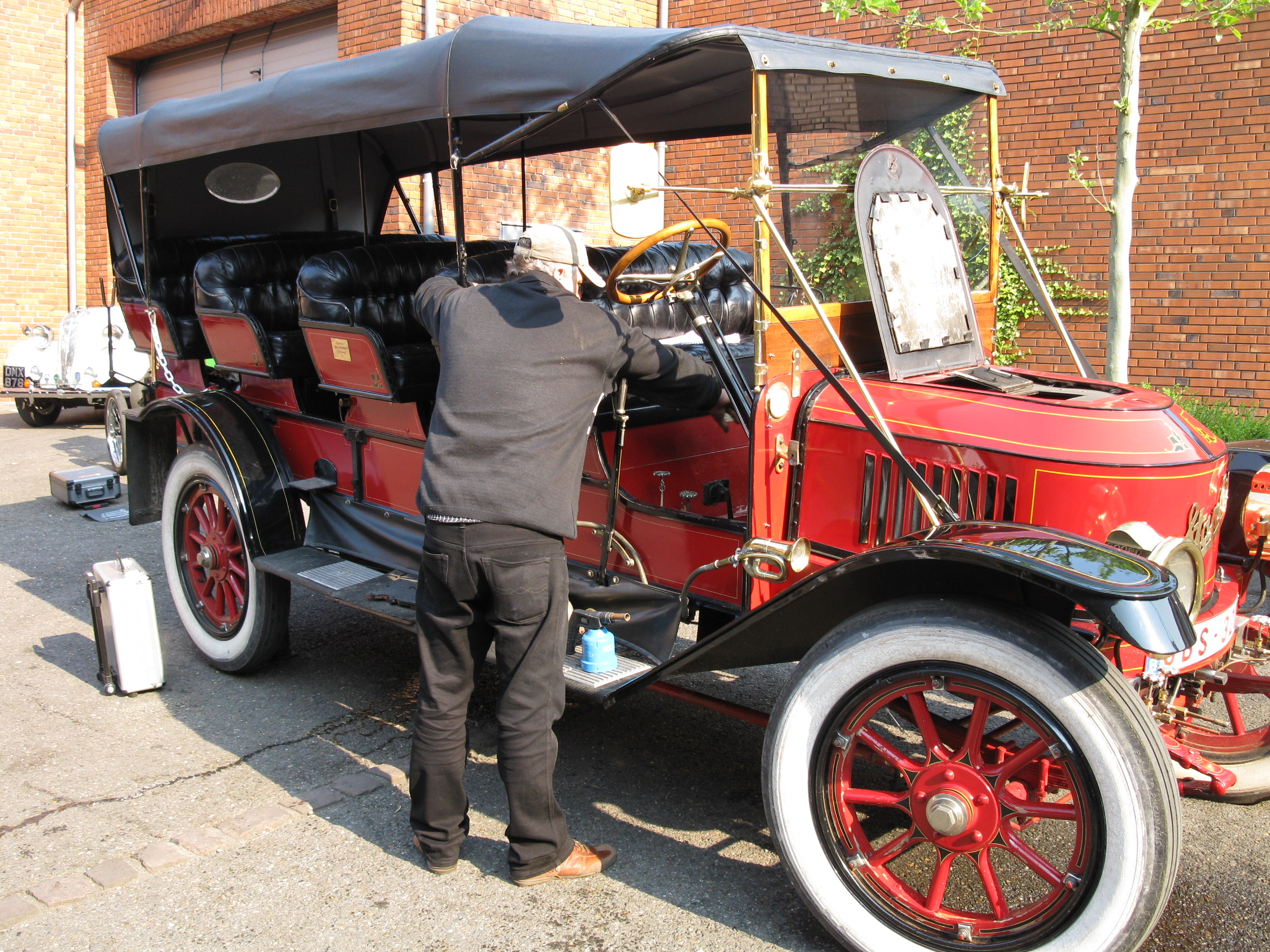
Stanley 30 HP 12-passenger Mountain Wagon (1912–1914) in Germany

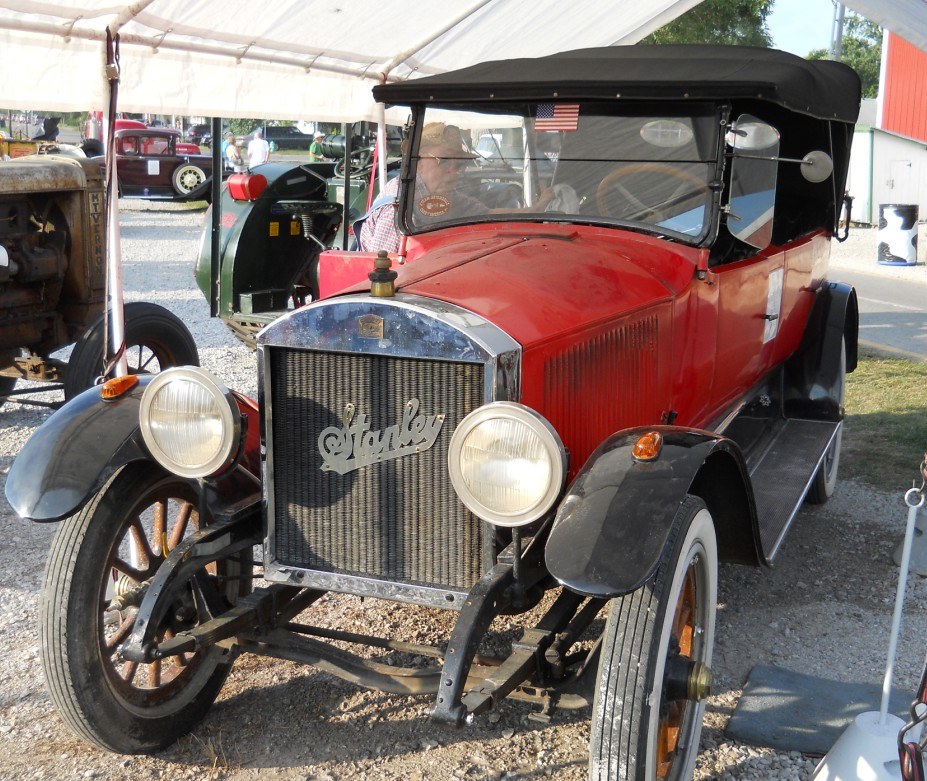
Stanley Model 735B ca. 1921

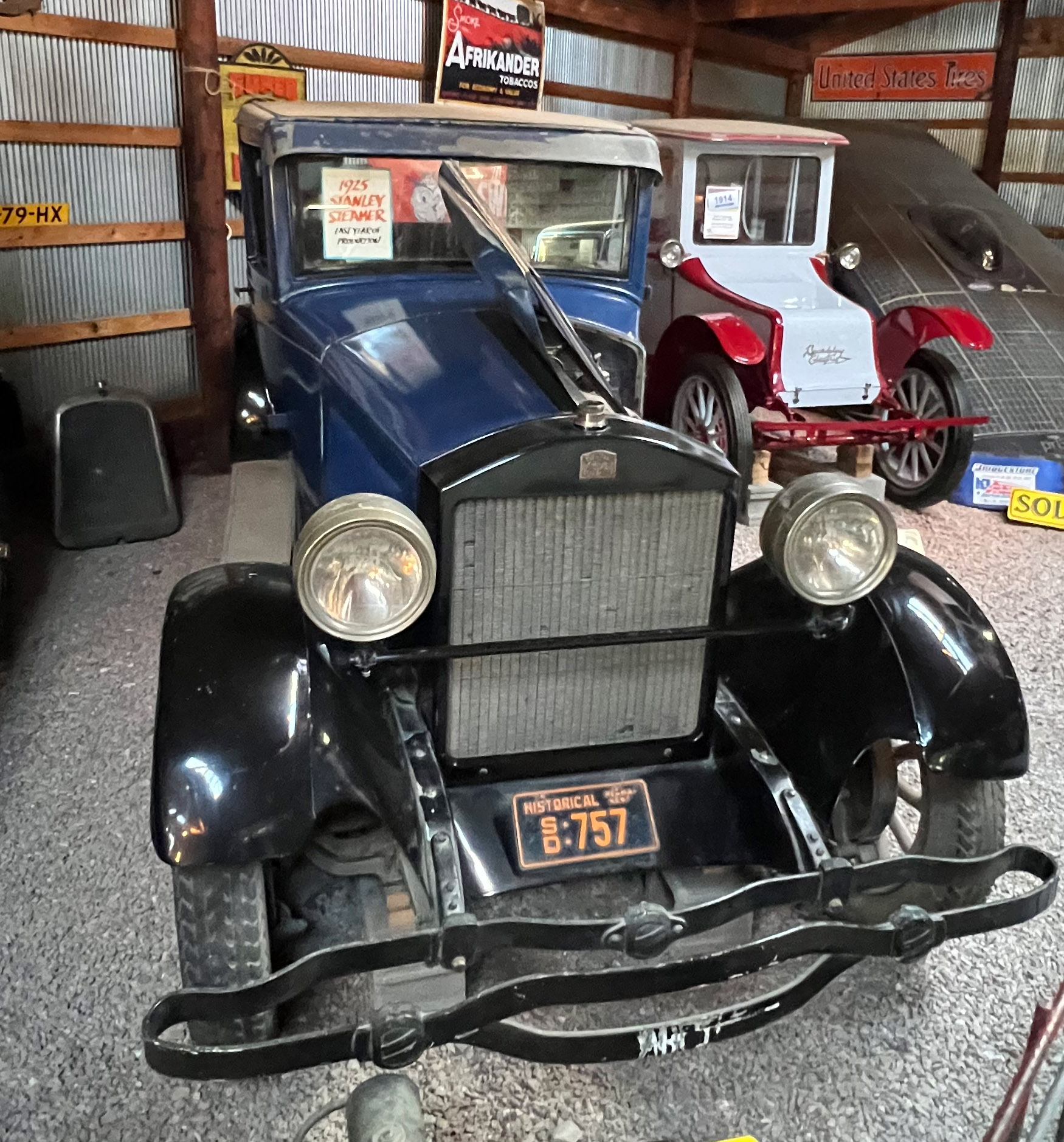
1925 Stanley Steamer on display at the Pioneer Auto Museum, Murdo, South Dakota

== See also ==
- Amzi L. Barber
- History of steam road vehicles
- John Brisben Walker
- Marshall Steam Museum
- Mobile Company of America
- Steam engine
- Timeline of steam power
- Steam fair
