= Sullivan County Courthouse =

Sullivan County Courthouse may refer to:

- Sullivan County Courthouse (Indiana)
- Sullivan County Courthouse (Missouri)
- Sullivan County Courthouse (New Hampshire)
- Sullivan County Courthouse (New York)
- Sullivan County Courthouse (Pennsylvania)
- Sullivan County Courthouse (Tennessee)
