= Newport, Indiana =

- Town
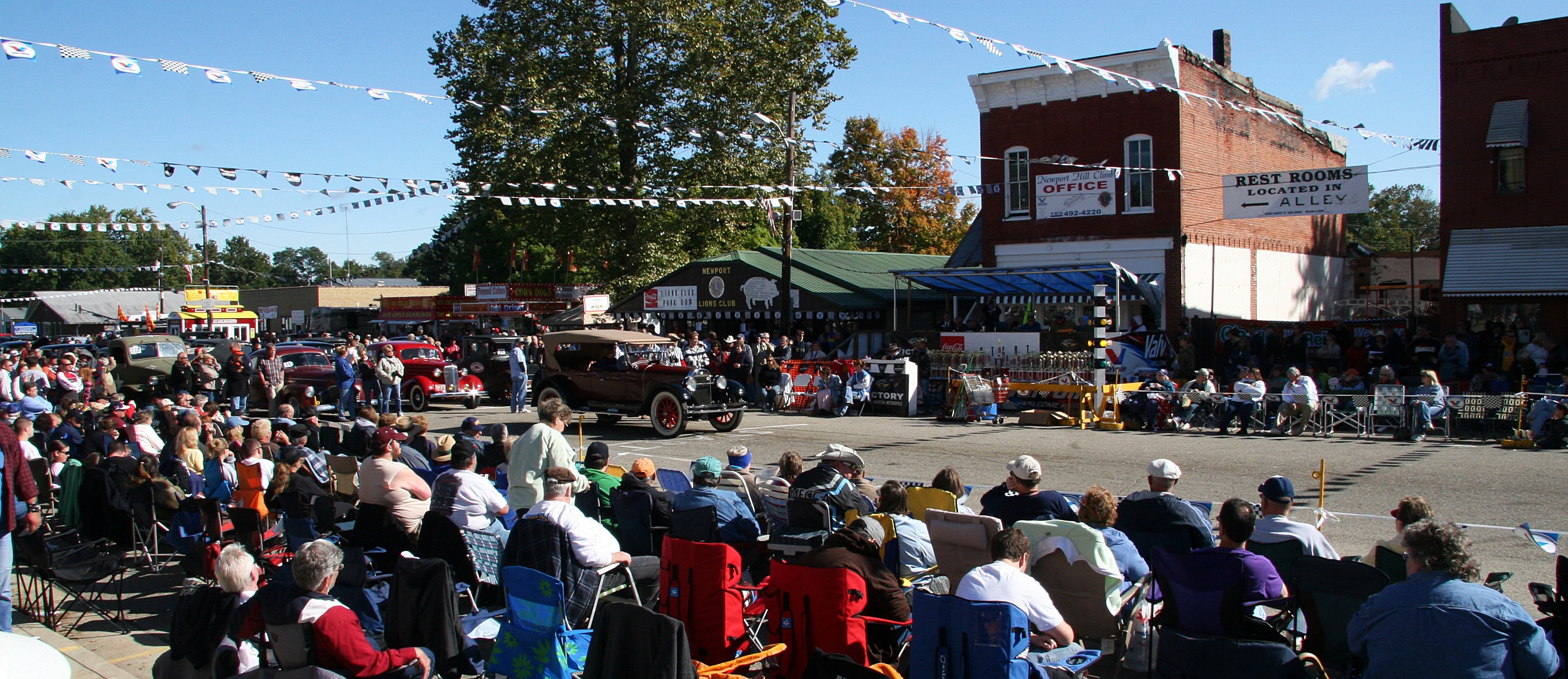
- Main Street during the Antique Auto Hill Climb

- Location of Newport in Vermillion County, Indiana.

- Map of Newport
- Coordinates: 39°53′03″N 87°24′26″W
- Country: United States
- State: Indiana
- County: Vermillion
- Township: Vermillion

Area
  - Total: 0.87 sq mi (2.26 km^{2})
  - Land: 0.87 sq mi (2.26 km^{2})
  - Water: 0 sq mi (0.00 km^{2})
- Elevation: 522 ft (159 m)

Population (2020)
  - Total: 416
  - Density: 477.3/sq mi (184.27/km^{2})
- Time zone: UTC-5 (Eastern (EST))
  - Summer (DST): UTC-4 (EDT)
- ZIP code: 47966
- Area code: 765
- FIPS code: 18-53496
- GNIS feature ID: 2396813

Newport is a town in Vermillion Township, Vermillion County, in the U.S. state of Indiana. As of the 2020 census, Newport had a population of 416. The town is the county seat of Vermillion County.

== History ==
A post office has been in operation at Newport since 1820. Newport was platted in 1828.

The Vermillion County Courthouse and Vermillion County Jail and Sheriff's Residence are listed on the National Register of Historic Places.

== Geography ==
Newport is located at the confluence of the Little Vermilion and Wabash rivers along Indiana State Road 63, about halfway between the county's north and south borders.

According to the 2010 census, Newport has a total area of 0.87 square miles (2.25 km^{2}), all land.

== Demographics ==
Historical population
| Census | Pop. | Note | %± |
|---|---|---|---|
| 1850 | 328 | | — |
| 1860 | 287 | | −12.5% |
| 1870 | 398 | | 38.7% |
| 1880 | 591 | | 48.5% |
| 1890 | 551 | | −6.8% |
| 1900 | 610 | | 10.7% |
| 1910 | 732 | | 20.0% |
| 1920 | 703 | | −4.0% |
| 1930 | 777 | | 10.5% |
| 1940 | 795 | | 2.3% |
| 1950 | 660 | | −17.0% |
| 1960 | 627 | | −5.0% |
| 1970 | 708 | | 12.9% |
| 1980 | 704 | | −0.6% |
| 1990 | 627 | | −10.9% |
| 2000 | 578 | | −7.8% |
| 2010 | 515 | | −10.9% |
| 2020 | 416 | | −19.2% |
U.S. Decennial Census

=== 2010 census ===
As of the census of 2010, there were 515 people, 211 households, and 149 families living in the town. The population density was 592.0 inhabitants per square mile (228.6/km^{2}). There were 231 housing units at an average density of 265.5 per square mile (102.5/km^{2}). The racial makeup of the town was 99.8% White and 0.2% from two or more races.

There were 211 households, of which 29.9% had children under the age of 18 living with them, 53.1% were married couples living together, 12.8% had a female householder with no husband present, 4.7% had a male householder with no wife present, and 29.4% were non-families. 26.1% of all households were made up of individuals, and 13.2% had someone living alone who was 65 years of age or older. The average household size was 2.44 and the average family size was 2.93.

The median age in the town was 42.1 years. 23.3% of residents were under the age of 18; 8.9% were between the ages of 18 and 24; 21.2% were from 25 to 44; 28.9% were from 45 to 64; and 17.7% were 65 years of age or older. The gender makeup of the town was 49.3% male and 50.7% female.

=== 2000 census ===
As of the census of 2000, there were 578 people, 237 households, and 162 families living in the town. The population density was 714.8 inhabitants per square mile (276.0/km^{2}). There were 253 housing units at an average density of 312.9 per square mile (120.8/km^{2}). The racial makeup of the town was 97.58% White, 0.35% Native American, 0.87% Asian, and 1.21% from two or more races. Hispanic or Latino of any race were 1.21% of the population.

There were 237 households, out of which 32.9% had children under the age of 18 living with them, 53.6% were married couples living together, 9.7% had a female householder with no husband present, and 31.6% were non-families. 27.8% of all households were made up of individuals, and 12.7% had someone living alone who was 65 years of age or older. The average household size was 2.44 and the average family size was 2.94.

In the town, the population was spread out, with 24.7% under the age of 18, 8.0% from 18 to 24, 29.1% from 25 to 44, 23.4% from 45 to 64, and 14.9% who were 65 years of age or older. The median age was 38 years. For every 100 females, there were 107.2 males. For every 100 females age 18 and over, there were 97.7 males.

The median income for a household in the town was $33,571, and the median income for a family was $36,389. Males had a median income of $36,518 versus $20,104 for females. The per capita income for the town was $16,771. About 5.9% of families and 9.1% of the population were below the poverty line, including 7.9% of those under age 18 and 9.5% of those age 65 or over.

== Education ==
It is in the North Vermillion Community School Corporation. That school district operates North Vermillion High School.

The town has a lending library, the Vermillion County Public Library.

== Arts and culture ==
Each fall, specifically the first weekend in October, Newport is host to the Newport Antique Auto Hill Climb, a racing event in which antique vehicles ascend the town's 1800-foot-long, 140-foot-tall hill. The popular event also features a car show, parade, and pageant. The Newport Antique Auto Hill Climb is an international event that attracts crowds of one hundred thousand plus to Newport. Automobiles, trucks and motorcycles from the Steam, Brass, Vintage, Antique, and Classic Car eras make timed runs from a standing start, up a steep hill to a finish line 1,800 feet away. It is an Indiana auto event third in size only to two annual Indianapolis Motor Speedway events, the Indianapolis 500 and Brickyard 400.

Newport, Indiana is listed as the place that Grace Anne Phillips was born and grew up in the movie Grace Is Gone, starring and produced by John Cusack.

== See also ==
- Newport Chemical Depot
