= Vermillion County Courthouse =

Historic place in Indiana, United States

- U.S. National Register of Historic Places
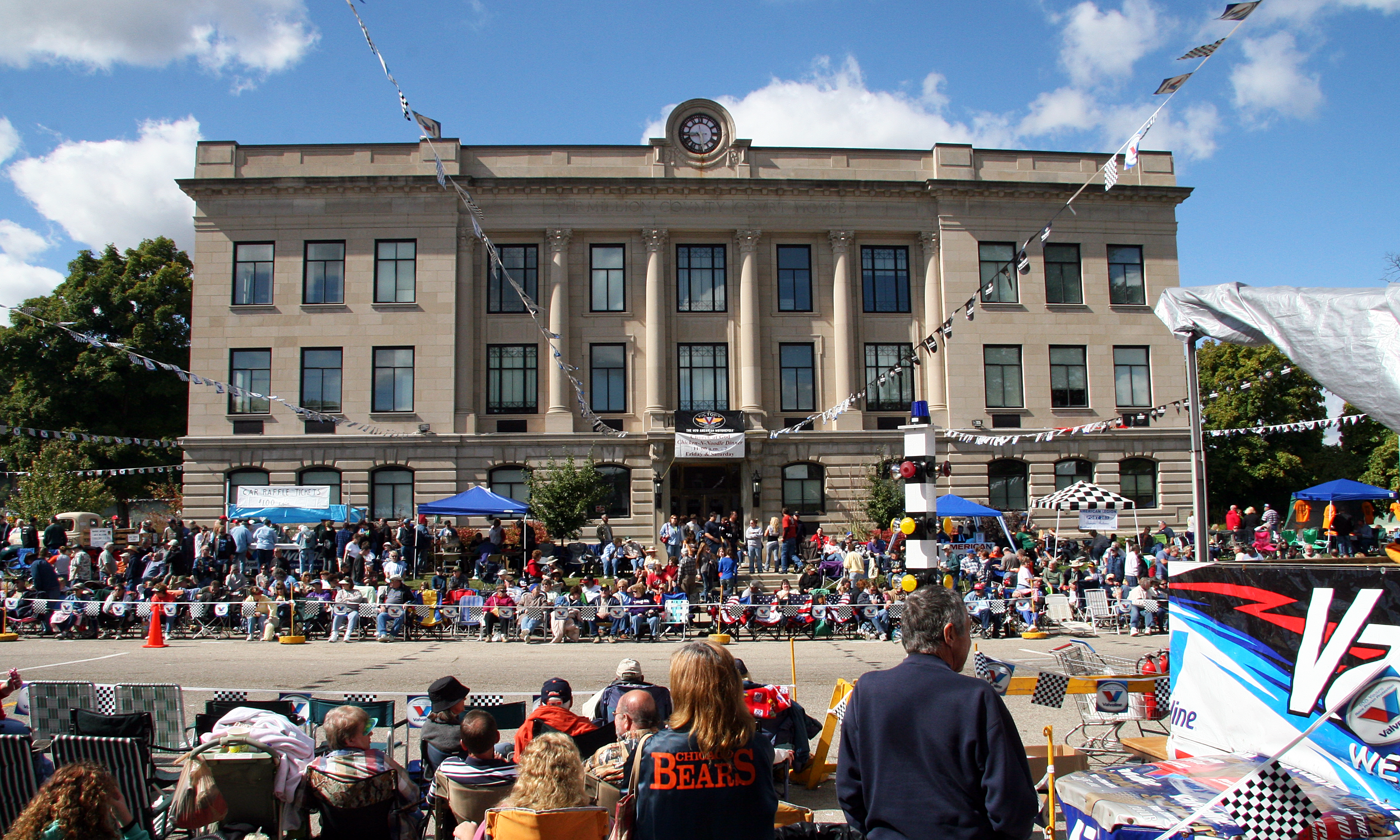
- The Vermillion County Courthouse during the 2009 Newport Antique Auto Hill Climb

- Location within Vermillion County, Indiana Location within Indiana Location within the United States
- Location: 255 S Main St., Newport, Indiana
- Coordinates: 39°53′5″N 87°24′34″W
- Area: less than one acre
- Built: 1923–25
- Built by: Fillinger, Halbert L.
- Architect: Bayard, John B.
- Architectural style: Classical Revival
- NRHP reference No.: 07001283
- Added to NRHP: December 19, 2007

The Vermillion County Courthouse, located at 255 S. Main St. in Newport, is the seat of government of Vermillion County, Indiana. The courthouse was built from 1923 to 1925 to replace the previous courthouse, which burned down in 1923. Architect John B. Bayard designed the building in the Classical Revival style. The building's design features a clock along the roof line on each side and Corinthian columns spanning the second and third floors in the front. Vermillion County's government has operated out of the courthouse since its construction, and the courthouse is one of 84 historic county courthouses surviving in Indiana. The building is nearly identical to the Sullivan County Courthouse.

The courthouse was added to the National Register of Historic Places on December 19, 2007.
