= Sullivan County Courthouse (Indiana) =

- U.S. National Register of Historic Places
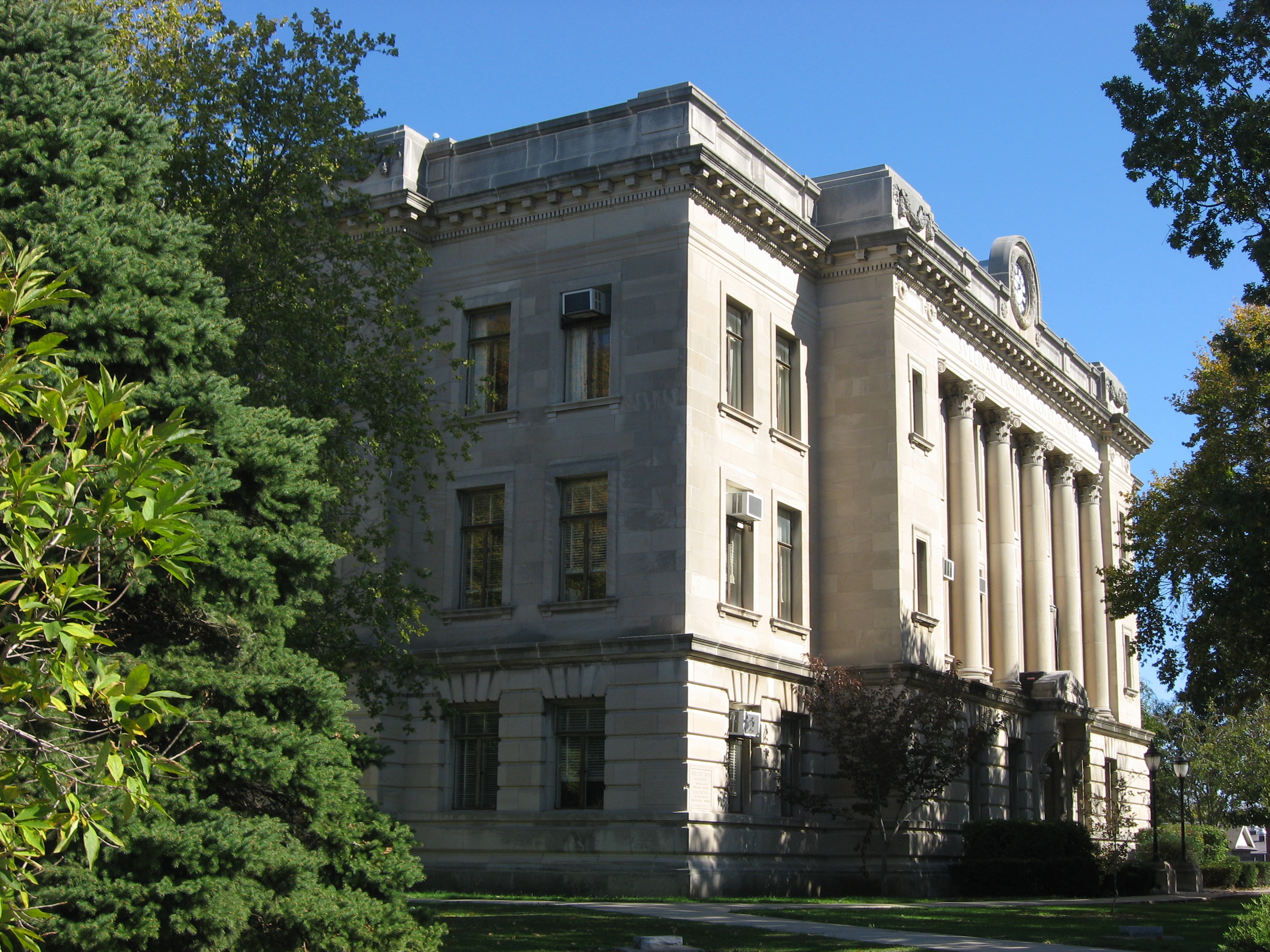
- Sullivan County Courthouse, October 2011

- Location within USA Indiana Sullivan County Location within Indiana Location within the United States
- Location: 100 Courthouse Sq., Sullivan, Indiana
- Coordinates: 39°05′42″N 87°24′28″W
- Area: 2 acres (0.81 ha)
- Built: 1926-1928
- Architect: Bayard, John; Heath, Walter
- Architectural style: Beaux Arts
- NRHP reference No.: 08001213
- Added to NRHP: December 22, 2008

Sullivan County Courthouse is a historic courthouse located at Sullivan, Indiana. It was built between 1926 and 1928, and is a three-story, nearly square, steel frame and concrete, Beaux-Arts style building faced in limestone. All four faces are nearly identical and feature a traditional Corinthian order composite cornice. The central of each facade has a rounded arch parapet with clock. The building is nearly identical to the Vermillion County Courthouse.

It was listed on the National Register of Historic Places in 2008.
