= Newport Antique Auto Hill Climb =

Antique racing festival

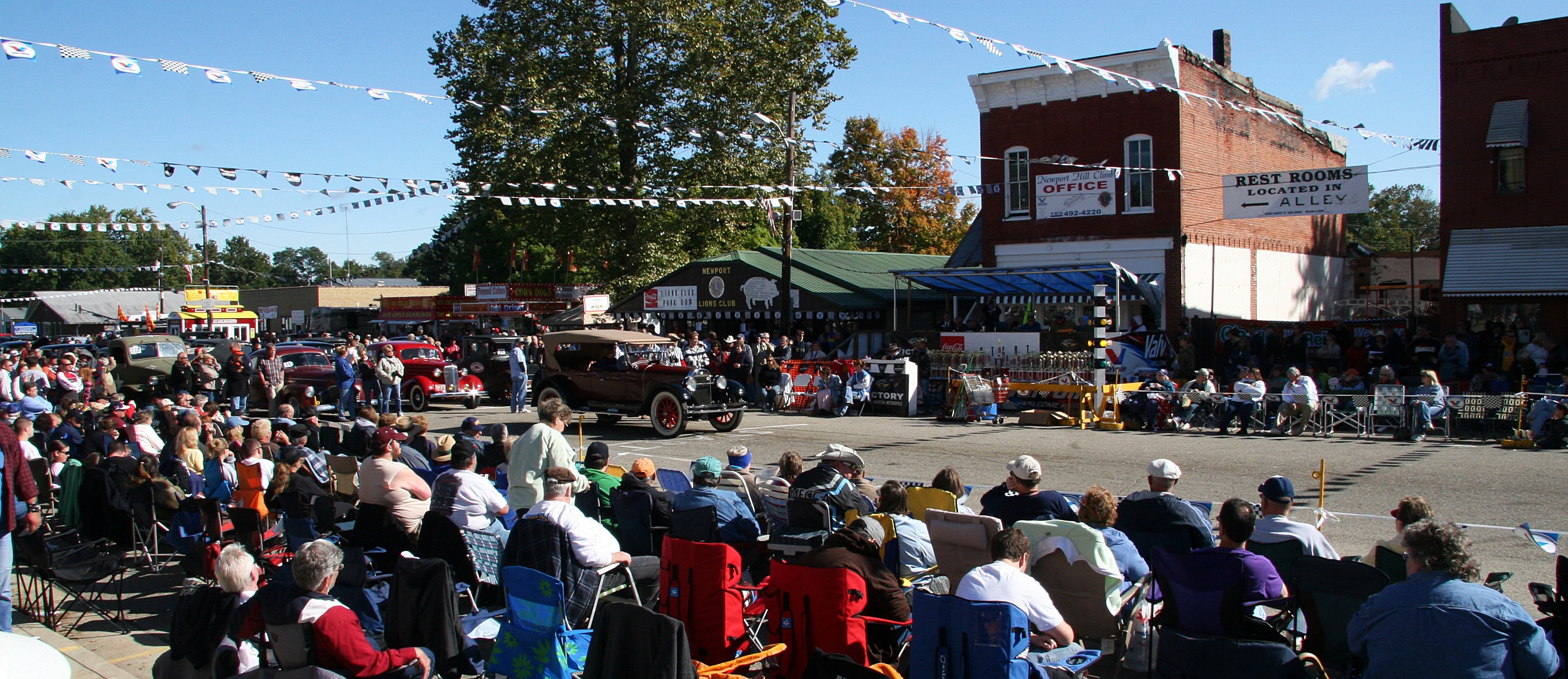
- Hill Climb starting line
- Status: Active
- Genre: Racing Festival
- Begins: 3 October 2025
- Ends: 5 October 2025
- Frequency: First Sunday of October
- Venue: Town Square
- Location: Newport, Indiana
- Coordinates: 39°53′6″N 87°24′23″W
- Country: USA
- Inaugurated: 6 October 1968
- Most recent: 1 October 2024
- Attendance: Over 250,000
- Sponsor: Newport Lions Club
- Website: newport-antique-auto-hillclimb.squarespace.com

The Newport Antique Auto Hill Climb is an annual festival that takes place on the first Sunday of October in Newport, Indiana, organized and sponsored by the Lions Club of Newport and the Town of Newport. The main event is a series of timed runs in which antique automobiles, trucks, and motorcycles from the Steam, Brass, Vintage, Antique, and Classic Car eras ascend the town's steep, 1800-foot-long Main Street hill as quickly as possible. The festival is the third-largest auto event in Indiana after the Indy 500 and Brickyard 400.

== History ==
The first Hill Climb was held in 1909 and organized by the businessmen of Newport as a way to capitalize on the interest in climbing the hill. Hill climbing contests were becoming more commonplace, and by 1915 the "newness" had worn off; board-track and other circular racing forms were becoming more popular. The financial returns to the businessmen shrank, as did the interest in holding the event, and the 1916 event never materialized.

The Newport Volunteer Fire Department rekindled the event as an Antique Auto Hill Climb in 1963 and 1964, but again the financial returns and shortage of manpower ended the event after two years.

In 1967, with urging from a number of antique car enthusiasts and car clubs, the Newport Lions Club was formed and the Hill Climb reborn as its major fund-raiser. The first event was held in 1968, and, soon after, the first Sunday of October was designated as the “race day". Early festivals began on Thursday or Wednesday, with nightly activities before settling into the current three-day format.

== Features ==
- Flea Market
- Baby Contest
- Kid's Big Wheels Race
- Parade
- Car Raffle
- Car Show
- Auto and Memorabilia Auction

== Gallery ==
1923 Ford making its ascent (2025)

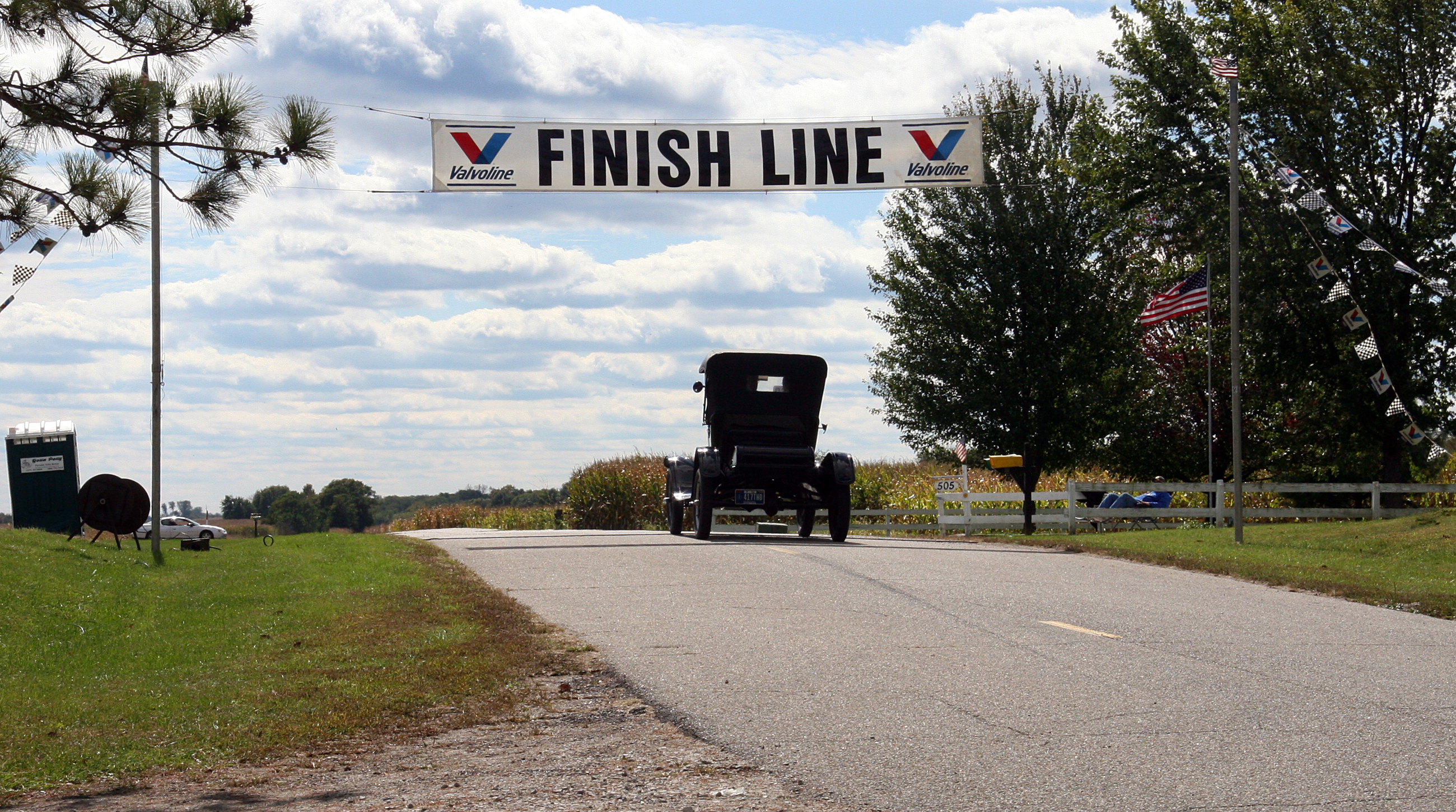
Model A Ford at the finish line (2009)

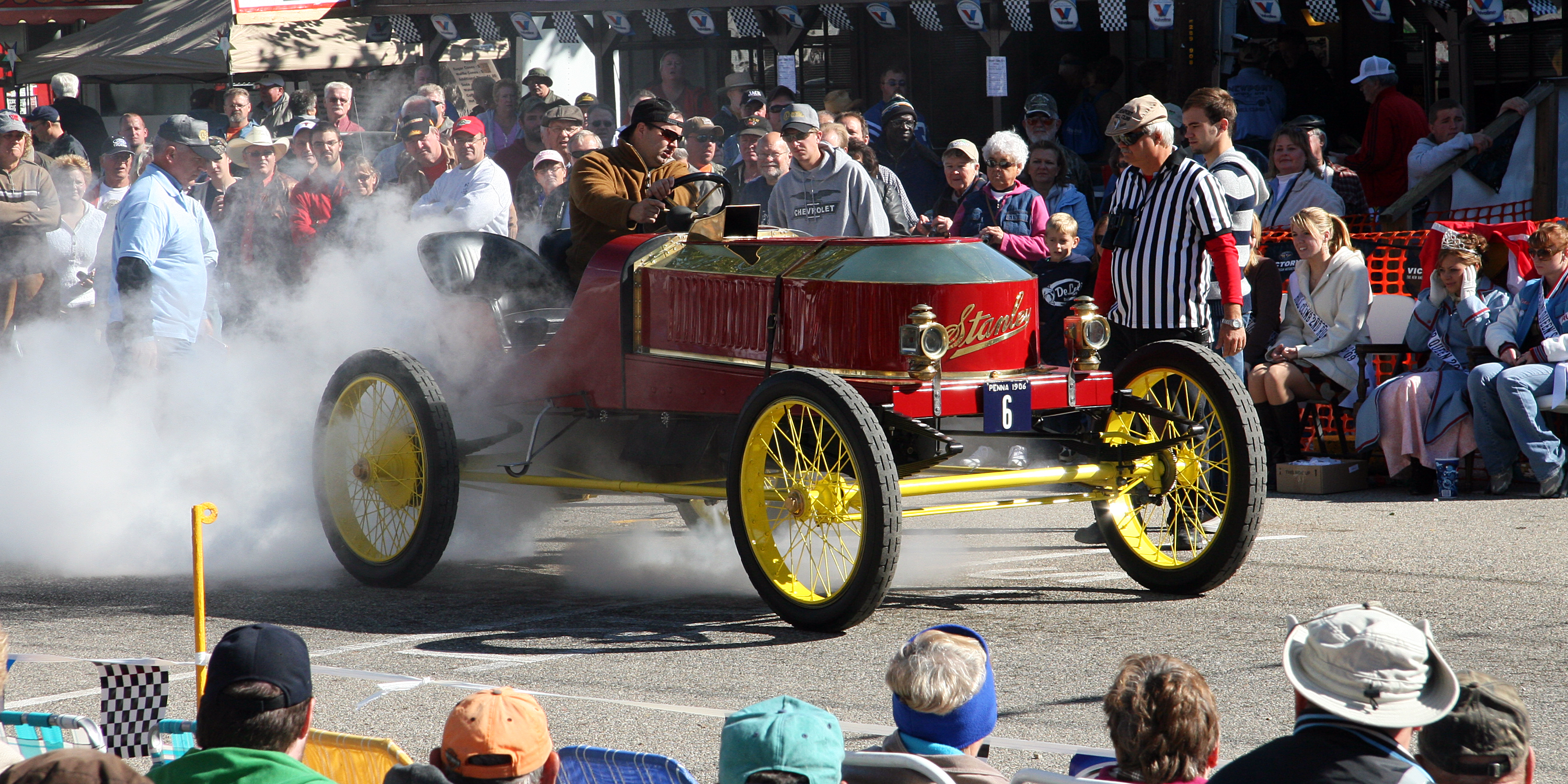
Stanley Steamer at the starting line (2009)
