= Indiana High School Athletics Conferences: Allen County – Metropolitan =

High School Conference

This is the first of three pages that lists all of the High School athletic conferences located in state of Indiana under the Indiana High School Athletic Association (IHSAA).

== Indiana's class system ==
Indiana's classes are determined by student enrollment, broken into classes of roughly equal size depending on sport. The 2011–12 school year marks a change in the classification period, as schools are reclassified in all class sports biennially instead of quadrennially.

It is also important to note that some schools (mostly private) are placed in classes higher than their enrollment. This is due to a new IHSAA rule that took effect for the 2012–13 year that dictates that school that wins two state championships in a row is automatically moved up into the next class.

Classes for 2020–21 through 2022–23: Most sports:

- Class A: >325 Students.
- Class AA: 325-565 Students.
- Class AAA: 566-1089 Students.
- Class AAAA: <1089 Students.

Football:

- Class A: >418 students
- Class AA: 418-591 students
- Class AAA: 592-849 students
- Class AAAA: 850-1499 students
- Class AAAAA: 1500-2099 Students
- Class AAAAAA: <2100 Students

Soccer:

- Class A: >499 students
- Class AA: 500-1000 students
- Class AAA: <1000 Students

== Explanation of colors ==
Schools that do not play football.
Schools that are affiliate members for certain sports.
Private or parochial schools.
Military Academies.
Public Magnet Schools.
Public schools that draw from multiple counties.
Public schools that draw from multiple time zones
Out of state schools. (e.g. Mount Carmel)
Conferences without State Locator Maps are entirely in one county. County Name and City(s) are listed above chart.

=== Allen County Athletic Conference ===
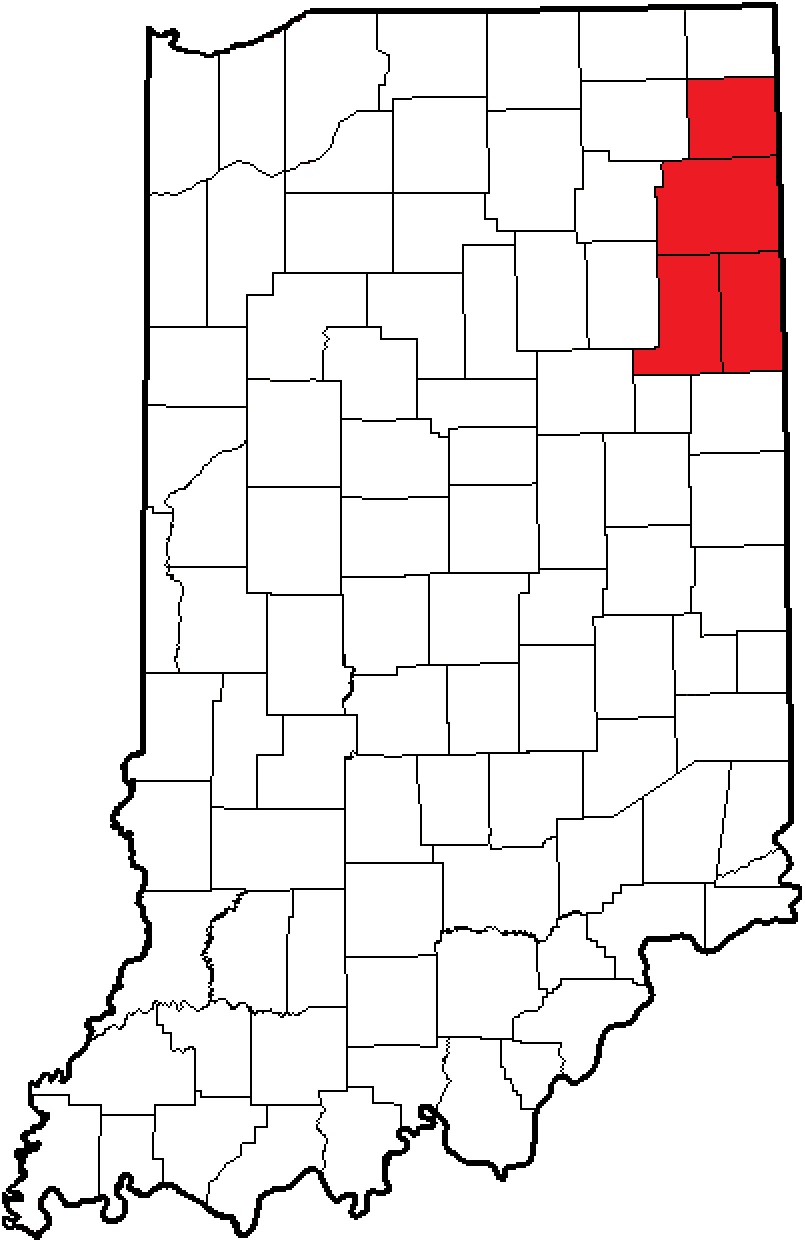
The Allen County Conference in Indiana

School	Location	Mascot	Colors	Enrollment (2021)	IHSAA Class	IHSAA Football Class	County
Adams; Central	Monroe	Flying Jets		371	AA	A	01; Adams
Bluffton	Bluffton	Tigers		478	AA	AA	90; Wells
Heritage	Monroeville	Patriots		593	AAA	AAA	02; Allen
Jay County	Portland	Patriots		987	AAAA	AAAA	38 Jay
South; Adams	Berne	Starfires		352	AA	A	01; Adams
Southern; Wells	Poneto	Raiders		256	A	A	90; Wells
Woodlan	Woodburn	Warriors		525	AAA	AA	02; Allen

=== Blue Chip Conference ===
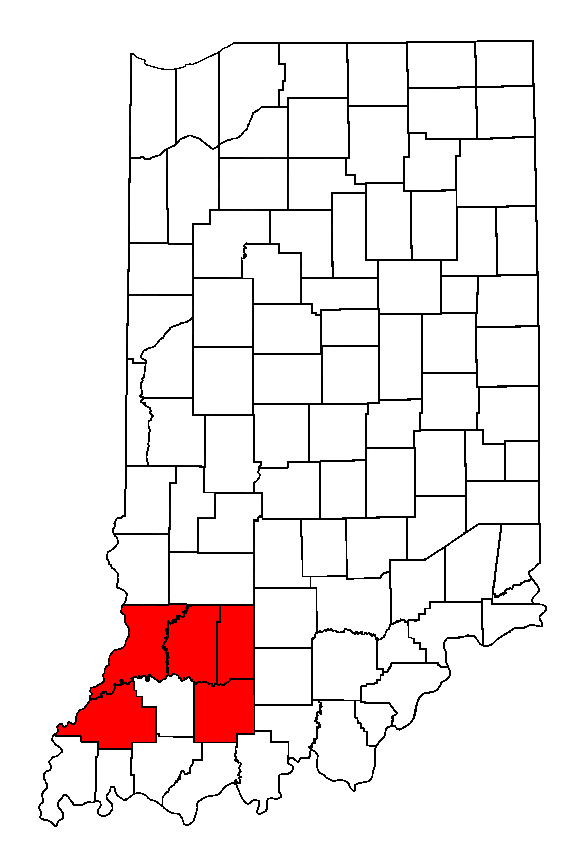
Location of Blue Chip members in Indiana

School	Location	Mascot	Colors	Enrollment (2020)	IHSAA Class	IHSAA Football Class	# / County
Barr-Reeve	Montgomery	Vikings		227	A	--	14; Daviess
Loogootee	Loogootee	Lions		286	A	--	51; Martin
North; Knox	Bicknell	Warriors		394	AA	A	42; Knox
Northeast; Dubois	Dubois	Jeeps		274	A	--	19; Dubois
Shoals	Shoals	Jug Rox		193	A	--	51; Martin
South; Knox	Vincennes	Spartans		361	AA	--	42; Knox
Vincennes; Rivet	Vincennes	Patriots		79	A	--	42; Knox
Washington; Catholic	Washington	Cardinals		68	A	--	14 Daviess
Wood; Memorial	Oakland City	Trojans		245	A	A	26; Gibson

- North Knox and Wood Memorial play football in the Southwest Seven Football Conference.

=== Central Indiana Athletic Conference ===
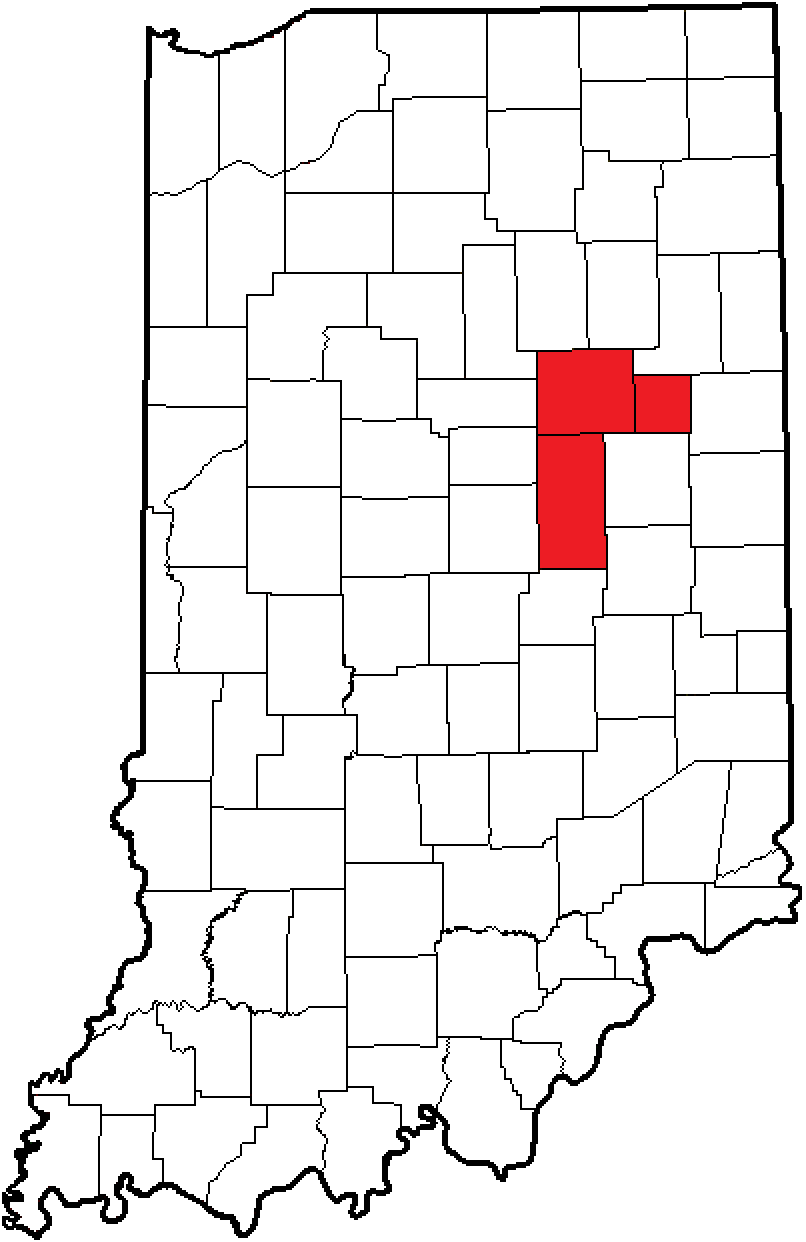
The Central Indiana Conference within Indiana

School	Location	Mascot	Colors	Enrollment	IHSAA Class	IHSAA Football Class	County
Alexandria; Monroe	Alexandria	Tigers		509	AA	AA	48; Madison
Blackford	Hartford City	Bruins		702	AAA	AAA	05; Blackford
Eastbrook	Marion	Panthers		625	AAA	AAA	27; Grant
Elwood; Community	Elwood	Panthers		530	AA	AA	48; Madison
Frankton	Frankton	Eagles		455	AA	AA	48 Madison
Madison; Grant	Fairmount	Argyll Warriors		532	AA	AA	27; Grant
Mississinewa	Gas City	Indians		670	AAA	AAA	27; Grant
Oak; Hill	Converse	Golden Eagles		525	AA	AA	27; Grant

=== Circle City Conference ===
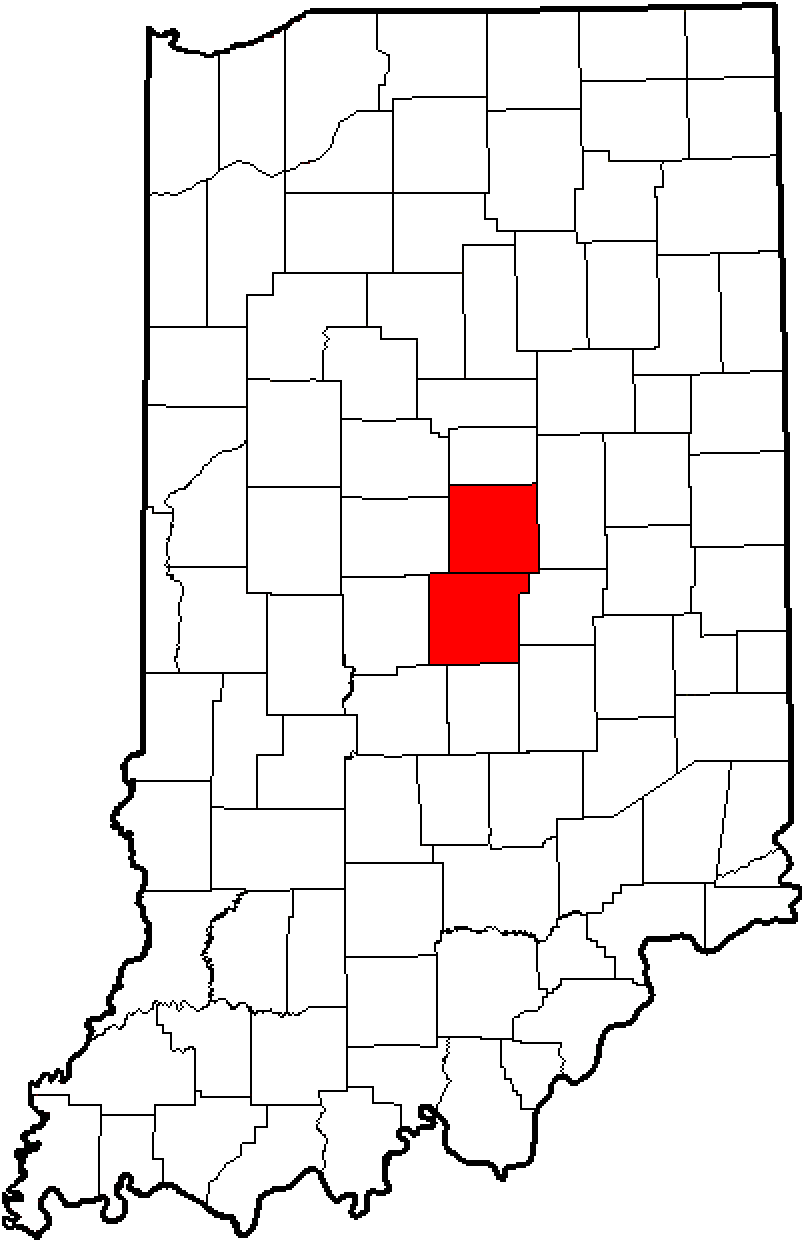
The Circle City Conference within Indiana

School	City	Mascot	Colors	Enrollment	IHSAA Class	IHSAA Football Class	County
Indianapolis; Bishop Chatard	Indianapolis	Trojans		699	AAA	AAA	49; Marion
Indianapolis; Brebeuf Jesuit	Indianapolis	Braves		806	AAA	AAA	49; Marion
Indianapolis Covenant Christian	Indianapolis	Warriors		365	AA	A	49 Marion
Noblesville; Guerin Catholic	Noblesville	Golden Eagles		772	AAA	AAA	29; Hamilton
Indianapolis Heritage Christian	Indianapolis	Eagles		462	AA	AA	49 Marion
Indianapolis; Roncalli	Indianapolis	Rebels		1,095	AAAA	AAAA	49; Marion

=== Conference Indiana ===
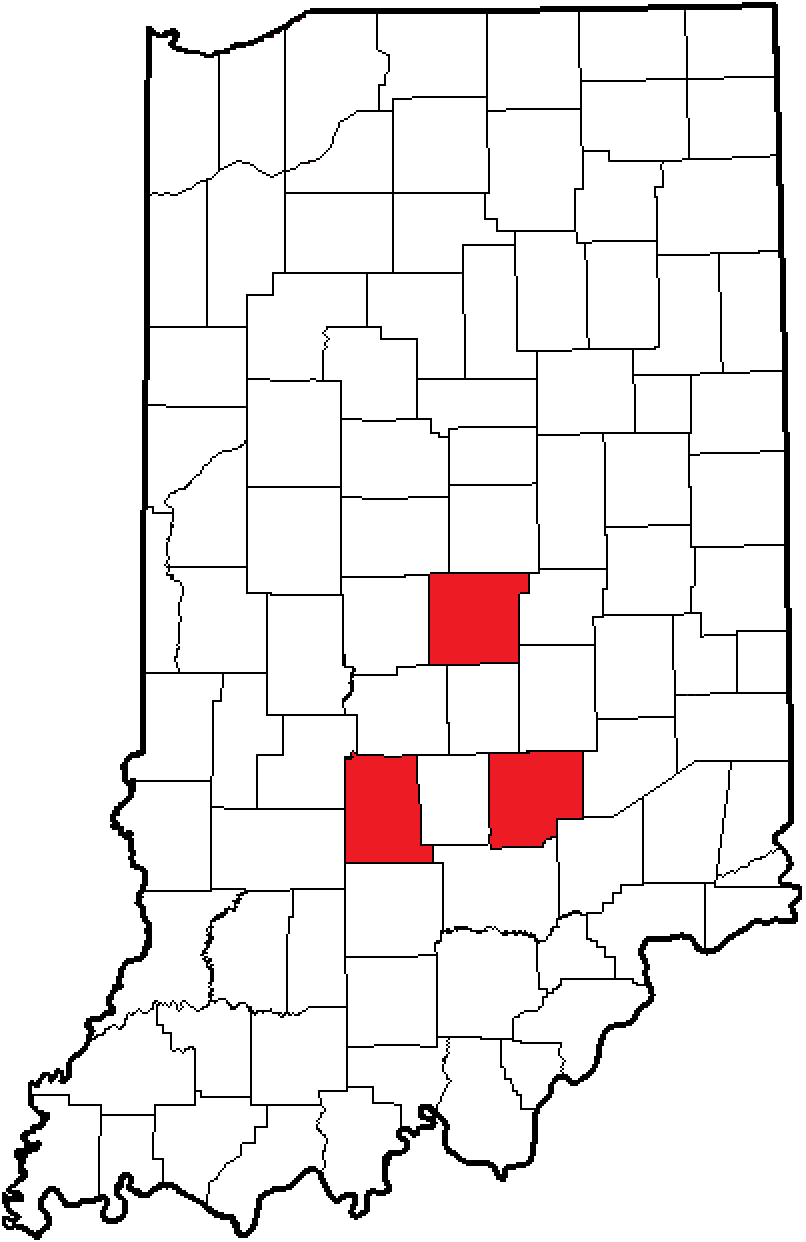
Conference Indiana within Indiana

School	Mascot	Colors	Location	Enrollment	IHSAA Class	IHSAA Football Class	County
Bloomington; North	Cougars		Bloomington	1,599	AAAA	AAAAA	53; Monroe
Bloomington; South	Panthers		Bloomington	1,697	AAAA	AAAAA	53; Monroe
Columbus; North	Bulldogs		Columbus	2,022	AAAA	AAAAAA	03 Bartholomew
Southport	Cardinals		Indianapolis	2,256	AAAA	AAAAAA	49; Marion
Terre Haute North	Patriots		Terre Haute	1,644	AAAA	AAAAA	84 Vigo
Terre Haute South	Braves		Terre Haute	1,721	AAAA	AAAAA	84 Vigo

=== Duneland Athletic Conference ===
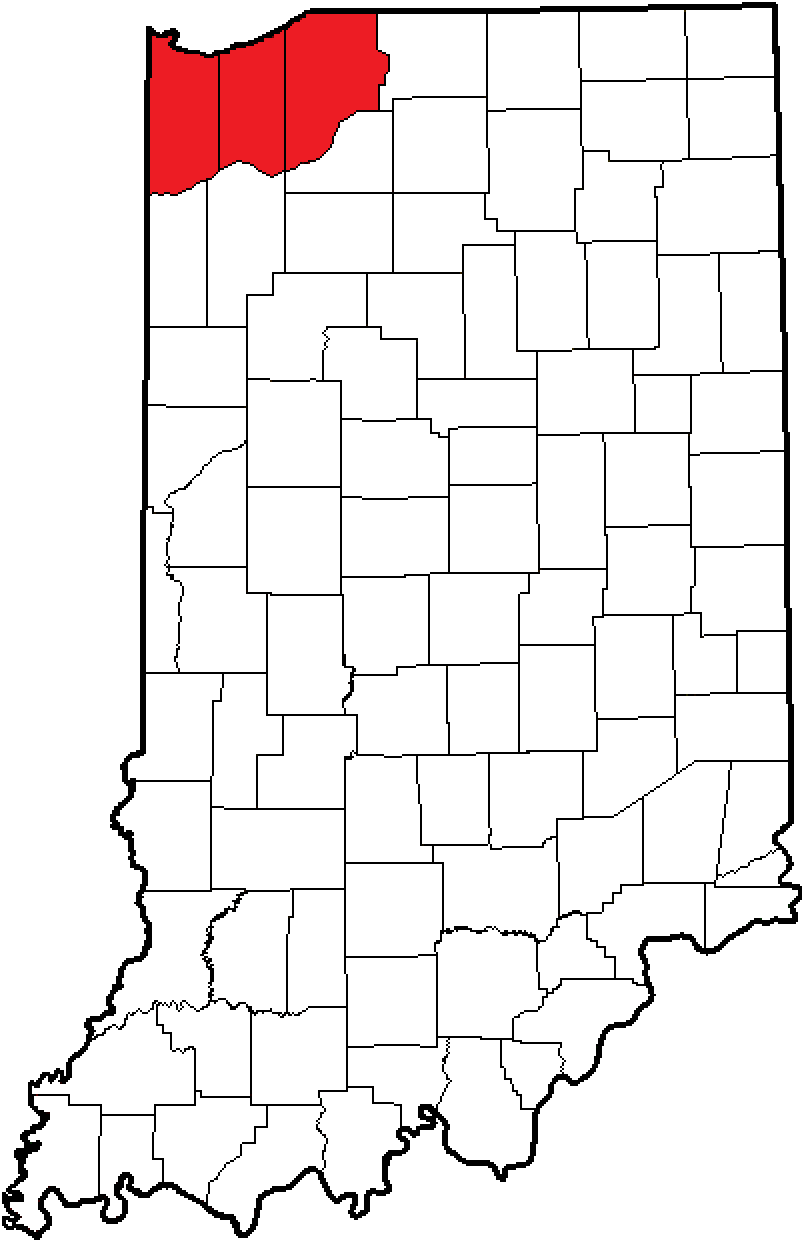
The Duneland Athletic Conference in Indiana

School	Mascot	Colors	Location	Enrollment	IHSAA Class	IHSAA Football Class	County
Chesterton	Trojans		Chesterton	2,069	AAAA	AAAAAA	64; Porter
Crown; Point	Bulldogs		Crown; Point	2,664	AAAA	AAAAAA	45; Lake
Lake; Central	Indians		Saint John	3,196	AAAA	AAAAAA	45; Lake
LaPorte	Slicers		LaPorte	2,009	AAAA	AAAAA	46; LaPorte
Merrillville	Pirates		Merrillville	2,187	AAAA	AAAAAA	45; Lake
Michigan; City	Wolves		Michigan City	1,701	AAAA	AAAAA	46 LaPorte
Portage	Indians		Portage	2,442	AAAA	AAAAAA	64; Porter
Valparaiso	Vikings		Valparaiso	2,054	AAAA	AAAAAA	64; Porter

=== Eastern Indiana Athletic Conference ===
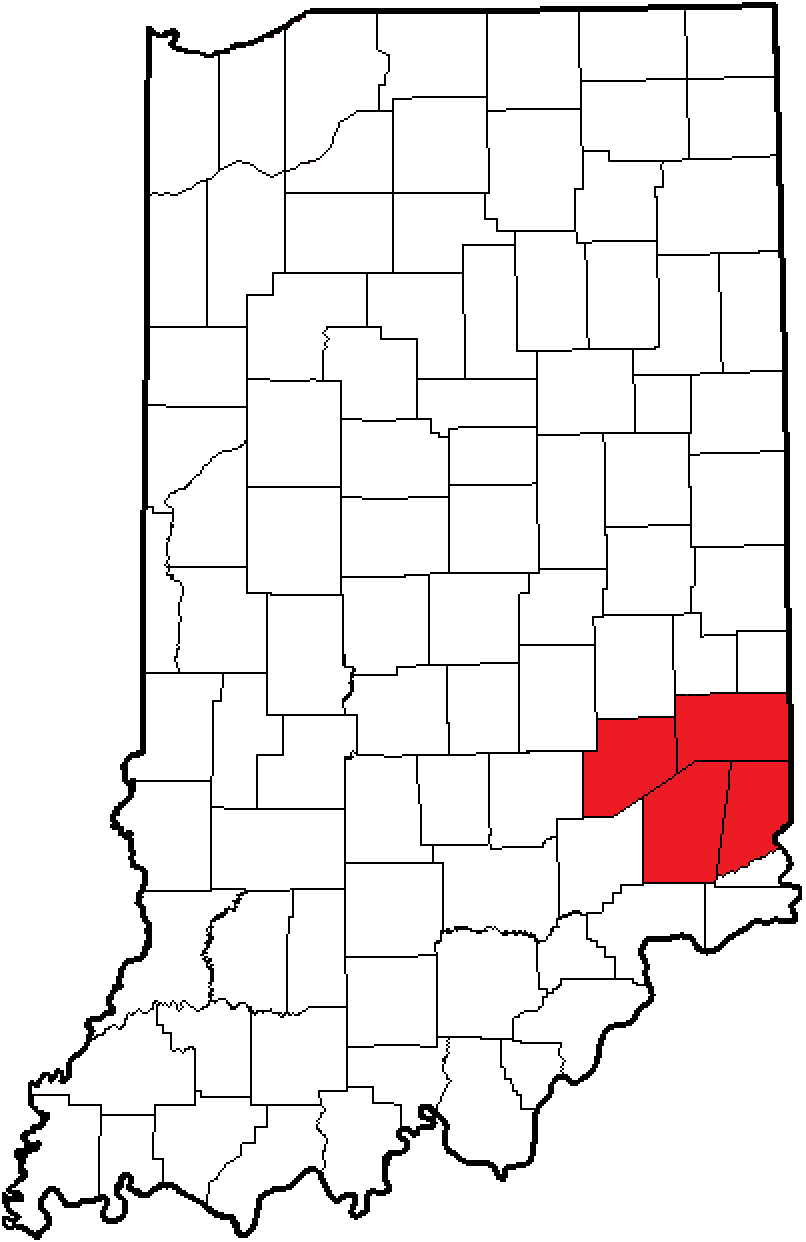
The Eastern Indiana Athletic Conference in Indiana

School	City	Team name	Colors	Enrollment	IHSAA Class	IHSAA Football Class	County
Batesville	Batesville	Bulldogs		735	AAA	AAA	69; Ripley
Connersville	Connersville	Spartans		1,111	AAAA	AAAA	21 Fayette
East; Central	St. Leon	Trojans		1,310	AAAA	AAAA	15; Dearborn
Franklin; County	Brookville	Wildcats		836	AAA	AAAA	24; Franklin
Greensburg	Greensburg	Pirates		750	AAA	AAA	16; Decatur
Lawrenceburg	Lawrenceburg	Tigers		620	AAA	AAA	15; Dearborn
Rushville	Rushville	Lions		746	AAA	AAA	70 Rush
South; Dearborn	Aurora	Knights		884	AAA	AAAA	15; Dearborn

=== Great Lakes Athletic Conference ===
45 Lake County

School	City	Mascot	Colors	Enrollment	IHSAA Class	IHSAA Football Class
East Chicago Central	East Chicago	Cardinals		1,127	AAA	AAAA
Gary West Side	Gary	Cougars		1,348	AAA	AAAA
Hammond Central	Hammond	Wolves		1,951	AAAA	AAAAA
Hammond; Morton	Hammond	Governors		1,954	AAAA	AAAAA

Greater South Shore Athletic Conference

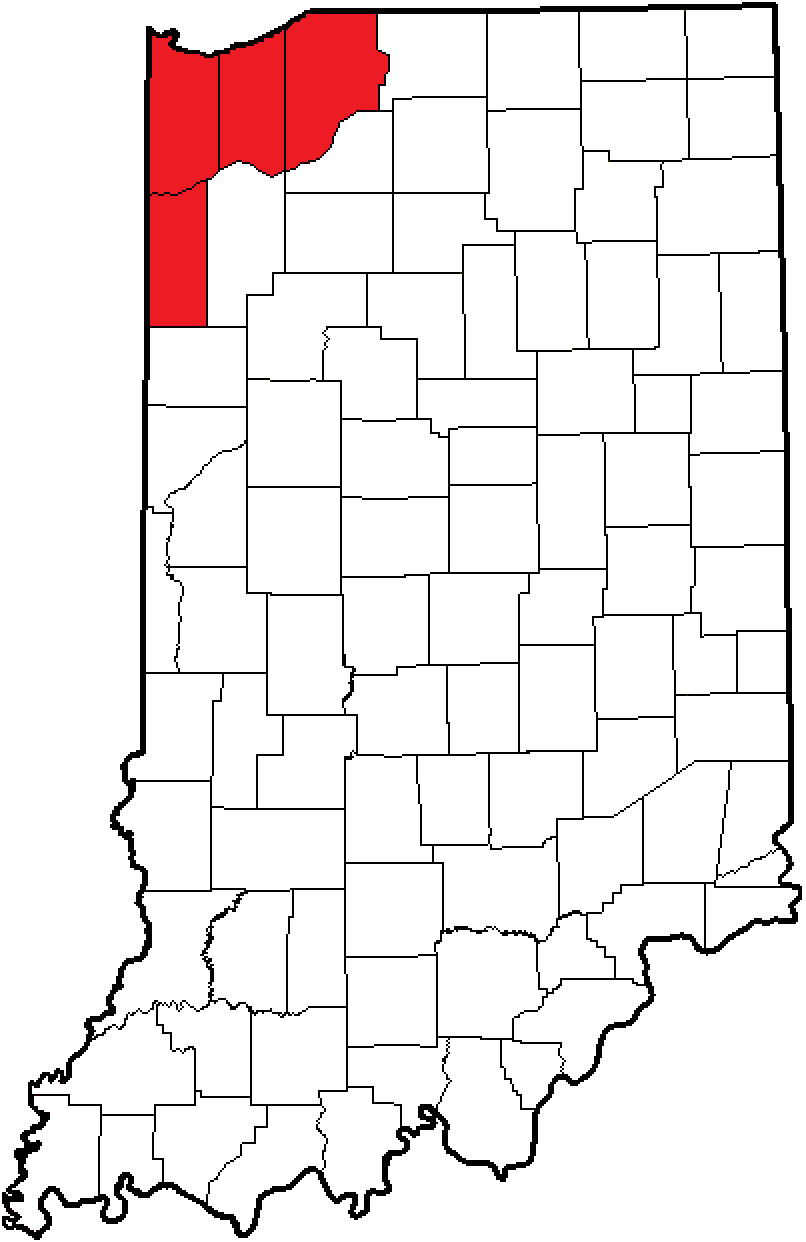
The Greater South Shore Conference in Indiana

School	City	Mascot	Colors	Enrollment	IHSAA Class	IHSAA Football Class	County
Hammond; Bishop Noll	Hammond	Warriors		404	AA	A	45; Lake
Valparaiso Boone Grove	Valparaiso	Wolves		528	--	AA	64 Porter
Gary; Calumet	Gary	Warriors		597	AAA	AAA	45; Lake
Griffith	Griffith	Panthers		823	AAA	AAA	45 Lake
Lake Station; Edison	Lake; Station	Fighting Eagles		423	AA	AA	45; Lake
River Forest	Hobart	Ingots		470	AA	AA	45; Lake
South Central (Union Mills)	Union; Mills	Satellites		297	--	1A	46; La Porte
Wheeler	Valparaiso	Bearcats		545	AA	AA	64; Porter
Whiting	Whiting	Oilers		381	AA	A	45; Lake

- South Central is a football-only member, other sports play in the Porter County Conference.

=== Hoosier Athletic Conference ===
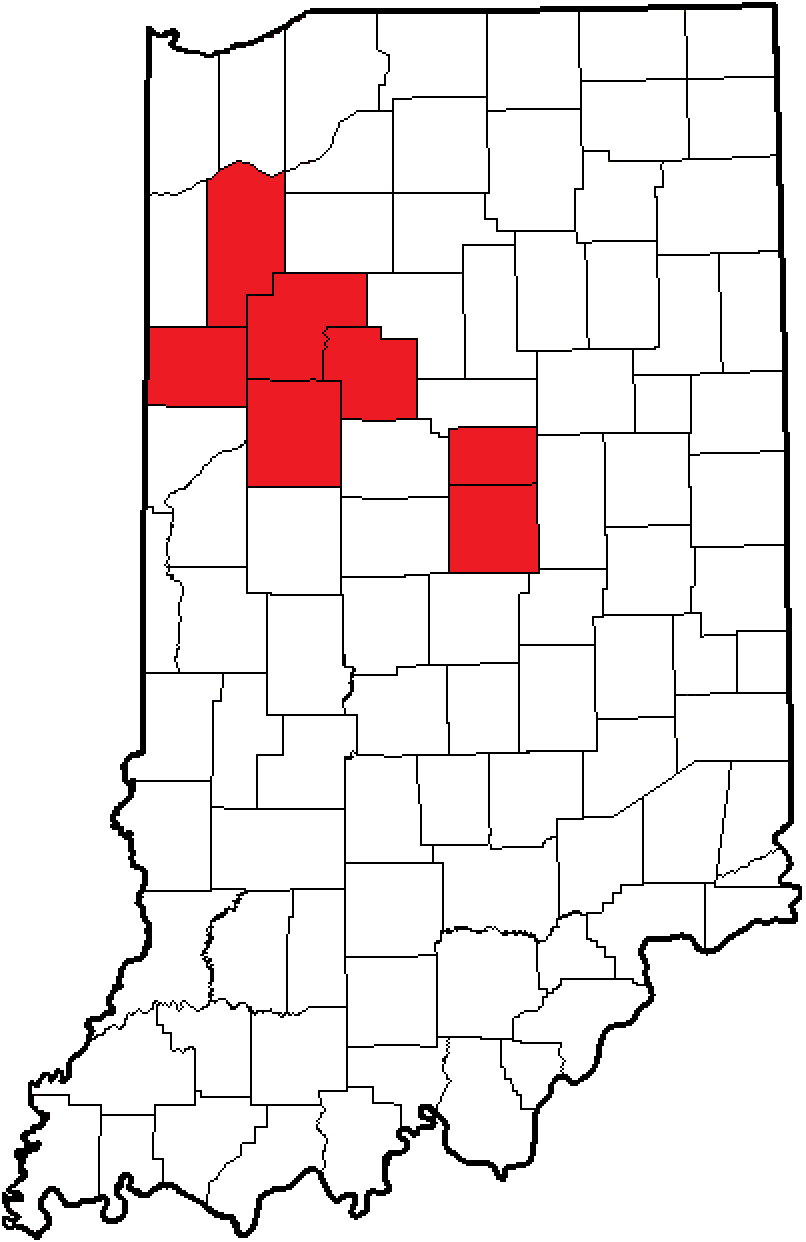
The Hoosier Athletic Conference in Indiana

School	City	Team name	Colors	Enrollment	IHSAA Class	IHSAA Football Class	County
Benton; Central	Oxford	Bisons		584	AAA	AA	04; Benton
Cass	Walton	Kings		502	AA	AA	09 Cass
Lafayette Central Catholic	Lafayette	Knights		227	A	A	79; Tippecanoe
Hamilton Heights	Arcadia	Huskies		714	AAA	AAA	29 Hamilton
Northwestern	Kokomo	Tigers		558	AAA	AAA	34 Howard
Renssalaer; Central	Renssalaer	Bombers		570	AAA	AA	37; Jasper
Tipton	Tipton	Blue Devils		565	AA	AA	80; Tipton
Twin; Lakes	Monticello	Indians		815	AAA	AAA	91; White
West; Lafayette	West Lafayette	Red Devils		732	AAA	AAA	79; Tippecanoe
Western	Russiaville	Panthers		808	AAA	AAAA	34 Howard

=== Hoosier Crossroads Conference ===
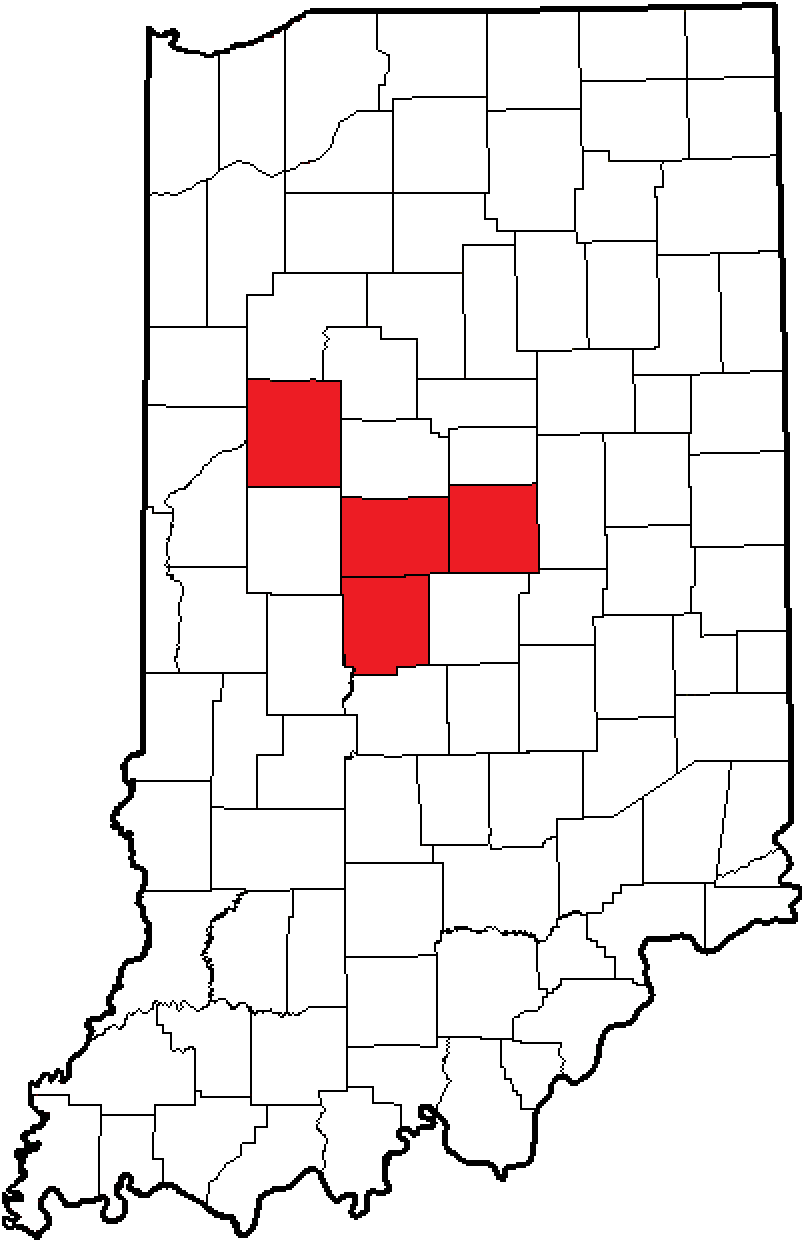
The Hoosier Crossroads Conference in Indiana

School	Mascot	Colors	Location	Enrollment	IHSAA Class	IHSAA Football Class	County
Avon	Orioles		Avon	2,512	AAAA	AAAAAA	32; Hendricks
Brownsburg	Bulldogs		Brownsburg	2,222	AAAA	AAAAAA	32; Hendricks
Fishers	Tigers		Fishers	2,236	AAAA	AAAAAA	29; Hamilton
Indianapolis; Franklin Central	Flashes		Indianapolis	2,804	AAAA	AAAAAA	49; Marion
Hamilton; Southeastern	Royals		Fishers	2,700	AAAA	AAAAAA	29; Hamilton
Noblesville	Millers		Noblesville	2,502	AAAA	AAAAAA	29; Hamilton
Westfield	Shamrocks		Westfield	2,048	AAAA	AAAAAA	29; Hamilton
Zionsville; Community	Eagles		Zionsville	1,697	AAAA	AAAAAA	06; Boone

=== Hoosier Heartland Conference ===
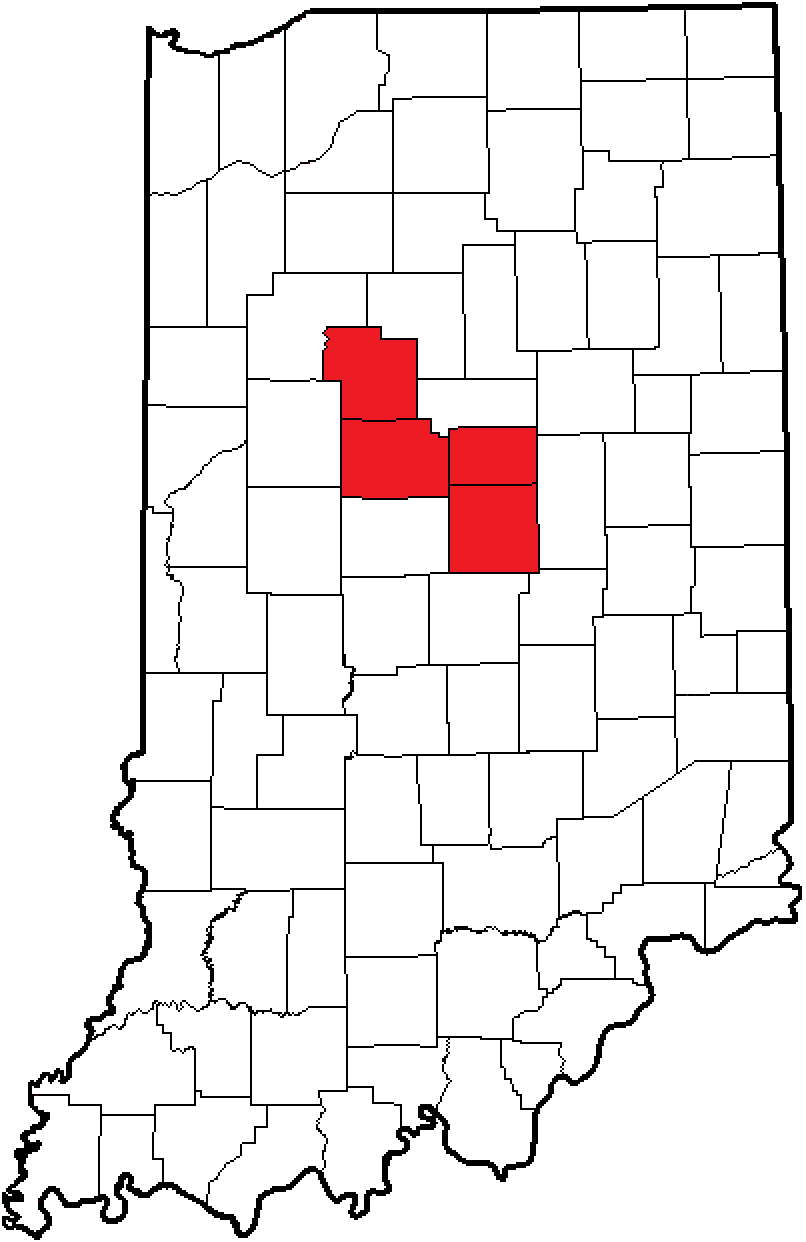
The Hoosier Heartland Conference in Indiana

School	Location	Mascot	Colors	Enrollment	IHSAA Class	IHSAA Football Class	# / County
Carroll	Flora	Cougars		337	AA	A	08; Carroll
Clinton; Central	Michigantown	Bulldogs		342	AA	A	12; Clinton
Clinton; Prairie	Frankfort	Gophers		286	A	A	12; Clinton
Greentown Eastern	Greentown	Comets		491	AA	AA	34 Howard
Rossville	Rossville	Hornets		318	A	--	12; Clinton
Sheridan	Sheridan	Blackhawks		329	AA	A	29 Hamilton
Taylor	Center	Titans		413	AA	AA	34 Howard
Tri-Central	Sharpsville	Trojans		304	A	A	80; Tipton

=== Hoosier Heritage Conference ===
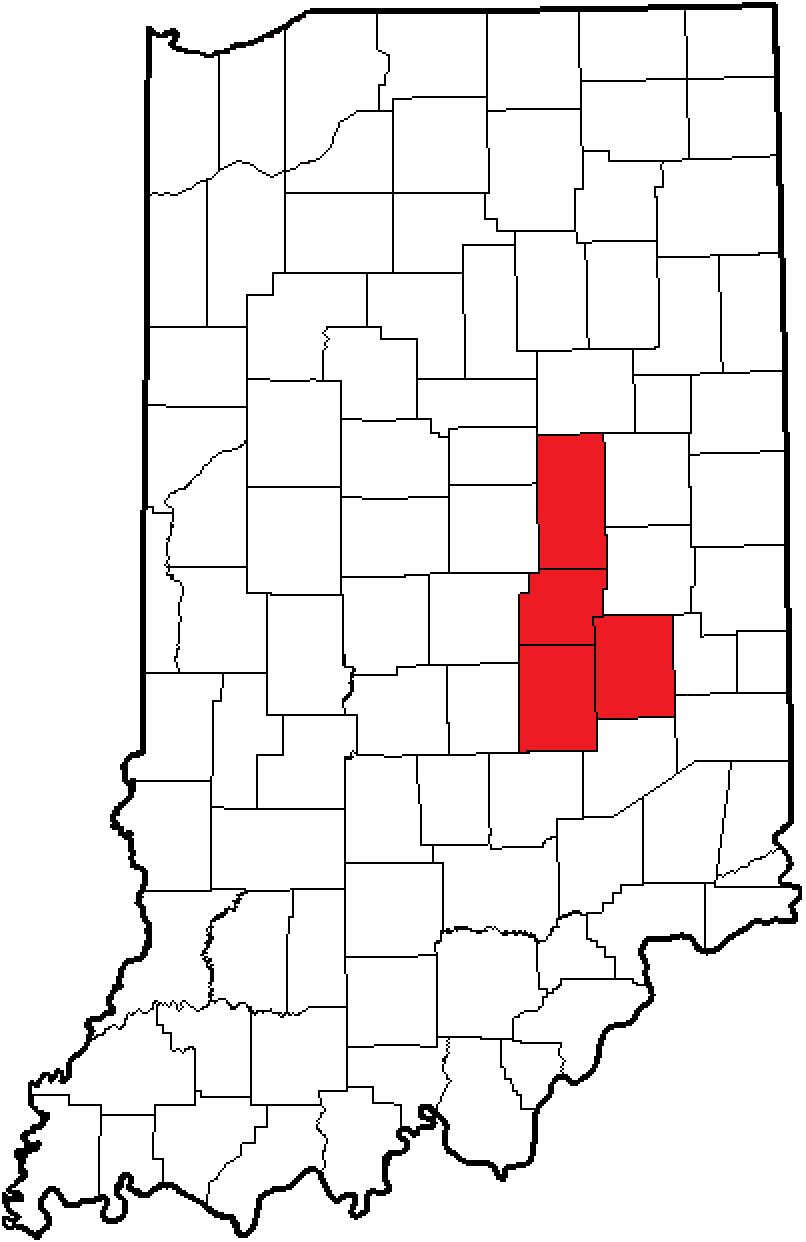
The Hoosier Heritage Conference in Indiana

School	Location	Mascot	Colors	Enrollment	IHSAA Class	IHSAA Football Class	# / County
Muncie; Delta	Muncie	Eagles		863	AAA	AAAA	18; Delaware
Greenfield; Central	Greenfield	Cougars		1,410	AAAA	AAAA	30; Hancock
Fortville Mount Vernon	Fortville	Marauders		1,077	AAA	AAAA	30; Hancock
New Castle	New Castle	Trojans		1,246	AAA	AAAA	33 Henry
New; Palestine	New Palestine	Dragons		1,092	AAAA	AAAA	30; Hancock
Pendleton; Heights	Pendleton	Arabians		1,235	AAAA	AAAA	48; Madison
Shelbyville	Shelbyville	Golden Bears		1,153	AAAA	AAAA	73; Shelby
Yorktown	Yorktown	Tigers		755	AAA	AAA	18; Delaware

Rushville will join the EIAC in 2013–14.

=== Hoosier Hills Conference ===
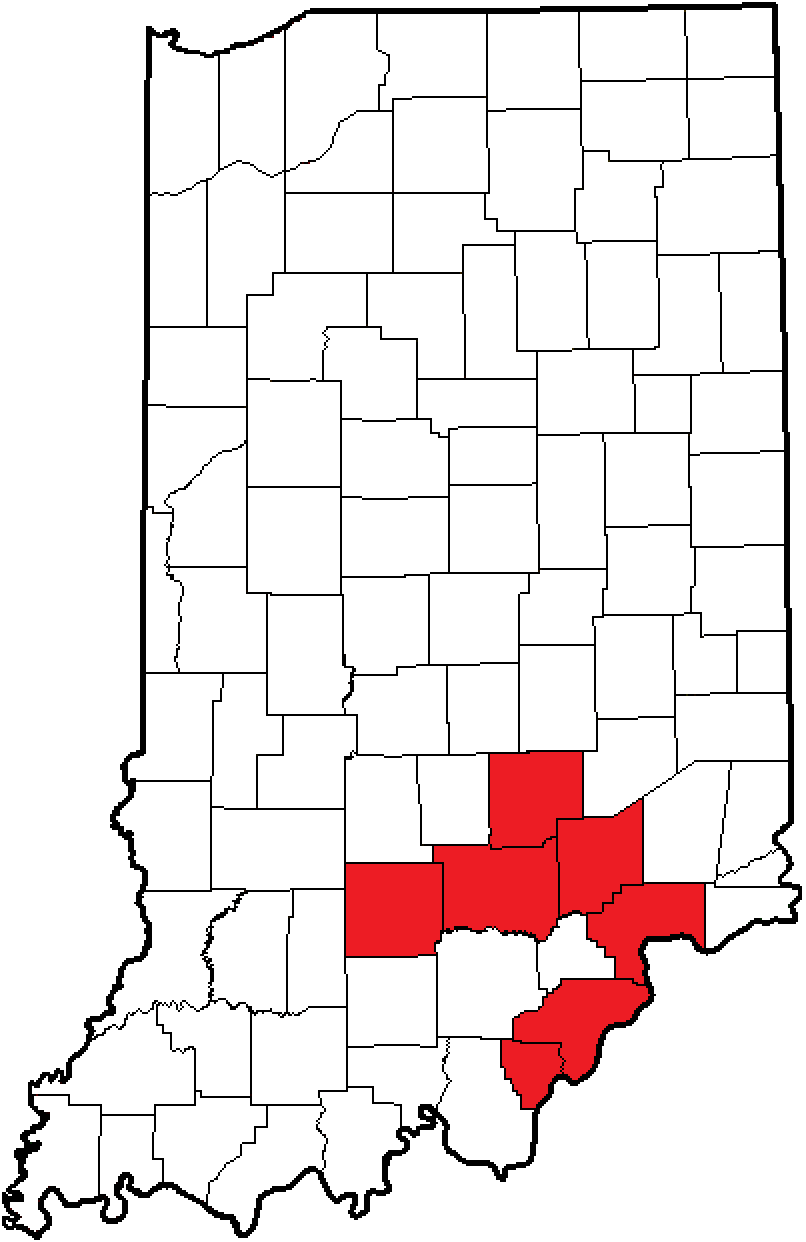
The Hoosier Hills Conference in Indiana.

School	Location	Mascot	Colors	Enrollment	IHSAA Class	IHSAA Football Class	County
Bedford; N. Lawrence	Bedford	Stars		1,435	AAAA	AAAAA	47; Lawrence
Columbus; East	Columbus	Olympians		1,514	AAAA	AAAA	03 Bartholomew
Floyd; Central	Floyds Knobs	Highlanders		1,856	AAAA	AAAAA	22; Floyd
Jeffersonville	Jeffersonville	Red Devils		2,132	AAAA	AAAAA	10; Clark
Jennings; County	North Vernon	Panthers		1,189	AAAA	AAAAA	40; Jennings
New; Albany	New Albany	Bulldogs		1,807	AAAA	AAAAA	22; Floyd
Seymour	Seymour	Owls		1,631	AAAA	AAAA	36; Jackson

=== Indiana Crossroads Conference ===
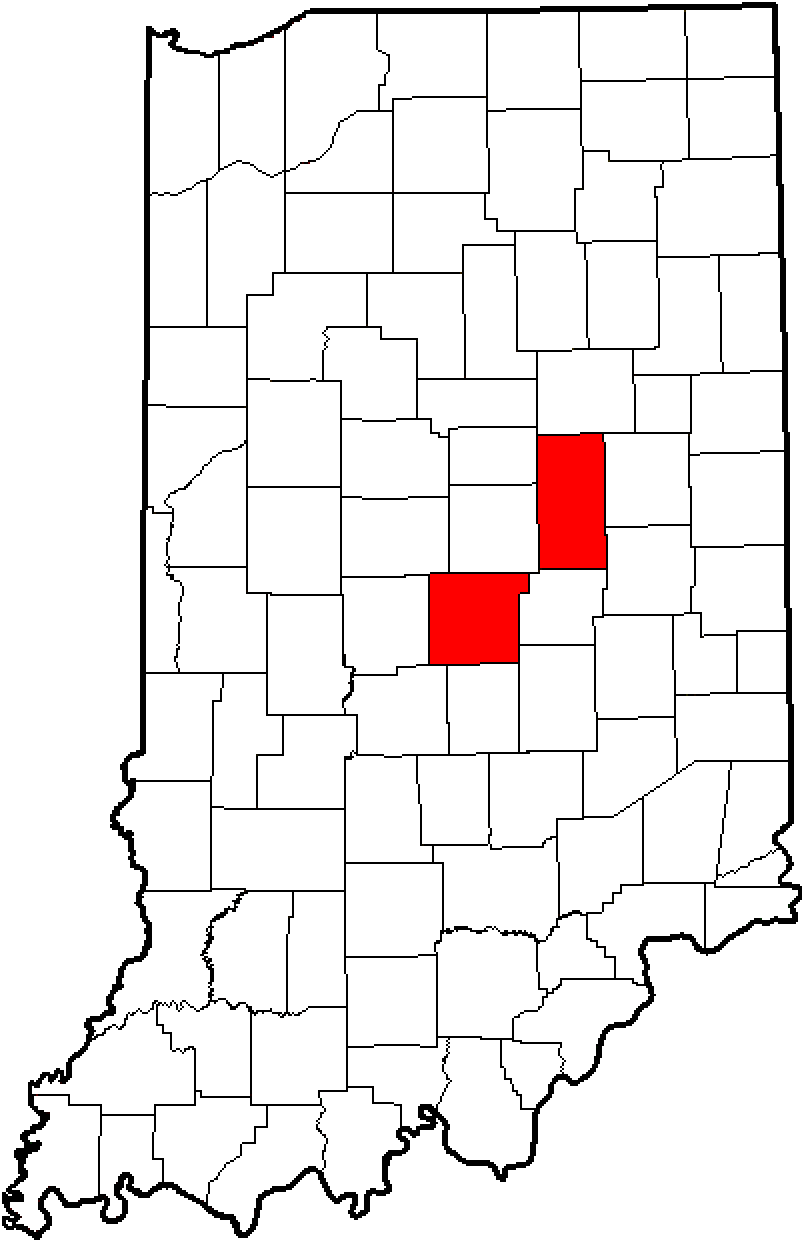
The Indiana Crossroads Conference in Indiana.

School	Location	Mascot	Colors	Enrollment	IHSAA Class	IHSAA Football Class	County
Beech; Grove	Beech Grove	Hornets		780	AAA	AAA	49; Marion
Indianapolis; Cardinal Ritter	Indianapolis	Raiders		490	AA	AA	49; Marion
Cascade	Clayton	Cadets		431	AA	AA	32 Hendricks
Indianapolis; Lutheran	Indianapolis	Saints		245	A	A	49; Marion
Monrovia	Monrovia	Bulldogs		536	AA	AA	55 Morgan
Indianapolis; Scecina Memorial	Indianapolis	Crusaders		332	AA	A	49; Marion
Speedway	Speedway	Sparkplugs		472	AA	AA	49; Marion
Triton Central	Fairland	Tigers		466	AA	AA	73 Shelby

=== Metropolitan Interscholastic Conference ===
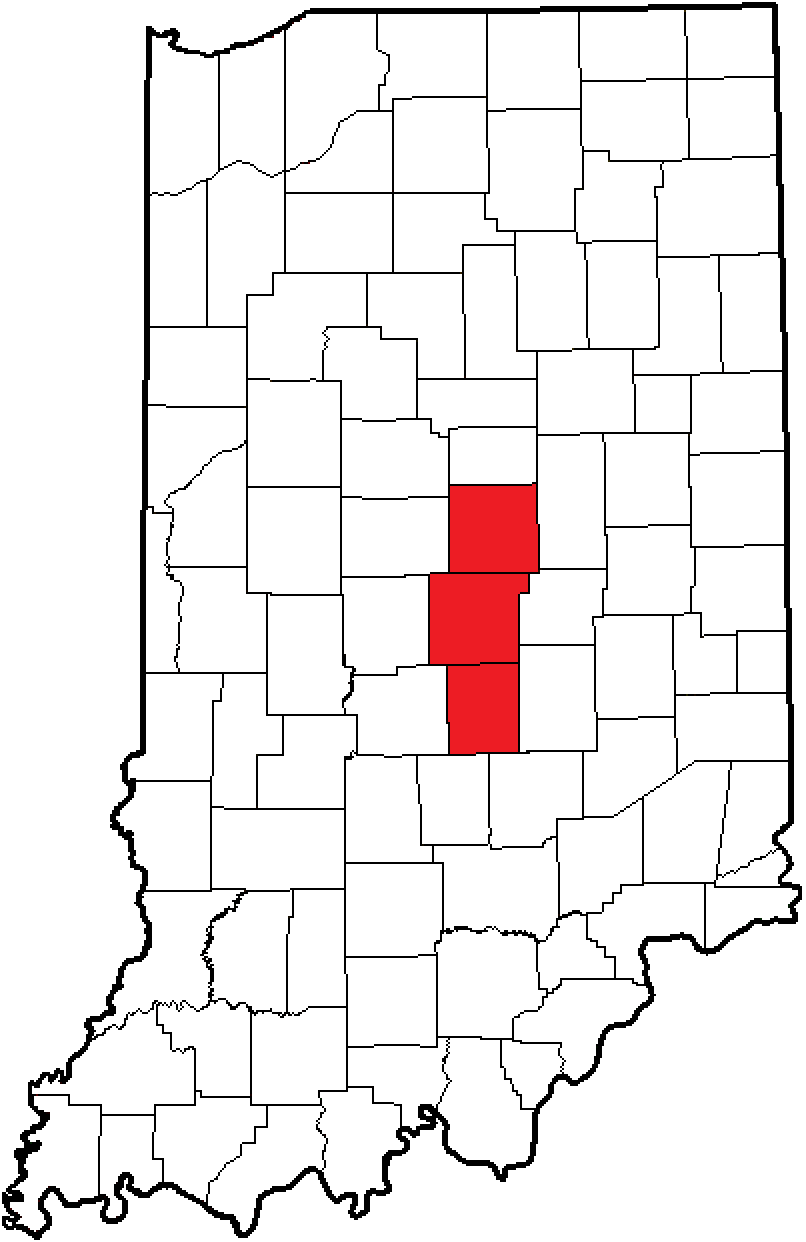
The Metropolitan Interscholastic Conference in Indiana

School	Mascot	Colors	Location	Enrollment	IHSAA Class	IHSAA Football Class	# / County
Indianapolis; Ben Davis	Giants		Indianapolis	4,343	AAAA	AAAAAA	49; Marion
Lawrence Central	Bears		Lawrence	2,269	AAAA	AAAAAA	49 Marion
Lawrence; North	Wildcats		Lawrence	2,861	AAAA	AAAAAA	49; Marion
Indianapolis; North Central	Panthers		Indianapolis	3,877	AAAA	AAAAAA	49; Marion
Indianapolis Pike	Red Devils		Indianapolis	3,406	AAAA	AAAAAA	49 Marion
Indianapolis; Warren Central	Warriors		Indianapolis	3,831	AAAA	AAAAAA	49; Marion

== See also ==
- Page 2: Mid-Eastern Conference - Northwestern Conference
  Page 3: Ohio River Valley Conference - Western Indiana Conference
