= Indiana Crossroads Conference =

- League: IHSAA
- Founded: 2005
- Sports fielded: men's: 10; women's: 10, unified: 1
- No. of teams: 6
- Region: 2 Counties: Marion, Johnson
- Website: https://iccathletics.wixsite.com/indiana-crossroads-c

Locations
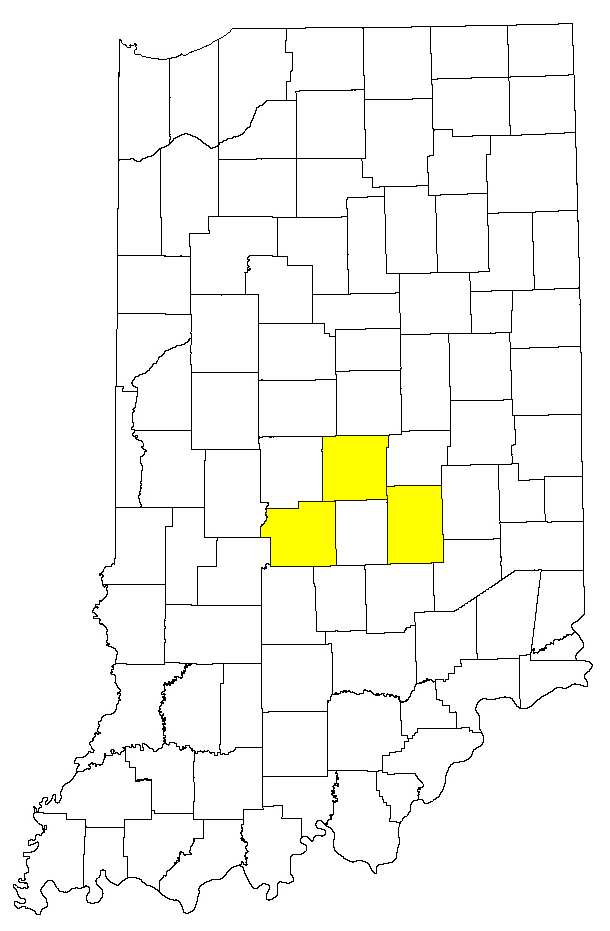

The Indiana Crossroads Conference is a six-school conference, with schools located in Marion and Johnson counties, consisting solely of smaller-to-medium private schools.

The latest conference changes have occurred with Cascade leaving the Indiana Crossroads Conference in 2024 to rejoin their west central Indiana rivals in the Western Indiana Conference. Covenant Christian moved from the Circle City Conference into the Indiana Crossroads Conference for the 2024–2025 academic year.

In July 2025, Greenwood Christian and Heritage Christian joined the Indiana Crossroads Conference, replacing Beech Grove, Monrovia, Speedway, and Triton Central, who left to form the new Hoosier Legends Conference.

A combined 34 IHSAA state championships have been won between the six current schools.

== Membership ==
School	Location	Mascot	Colors	County	Enrollment 2024–2025	IHSAA Class	IHSAA Class Football	Year joined	Previous conference
Cardinal Ritter	Indianapolis	Raiders		49; Marion	498	2A	2A	2005	Independents
Covenant Christian	Indianapolis	Warriors		49; Marion	383	2A	2A	2024	Circle City
Greenwood Christian	Greenwood	Cougars		41; Johnson	222	1A	1A	2025	Pioneer
Heritage Christian	Indianapolis	Eagles		49; Marion	507	2A	2A	2025	Circle City
Lutheran	Indianapolis	Saints		49; Marion	267	1A	2A	2009	Independents
Scecina Memorial	Indianapolis	Crusaders		49; Marion	448	2A	2A	2005	Independents (RC 2000)

=== Former members ===
School	Location	Mascot	Colors	County	Year joined	Previous conference	Year left	Conference joined
Beech Grove	Beech Grove	Hornets		49; Marion	2005	Mid-State	2025	Hoosier Legends
Park Tudor	Indianapolis	Panthers		49; Marion	2005	Independents (MIFC)	2019	Pioneer
Lapel^{1}	Lapel	Bulldogs		48; Madison	2009	White River	2014	Independents
Monrovia	Monrovia	Bulldogs		55; Morgan	2014	West Central	2025	Hoosier Legends
Cascade	Clayton	Cadets		32; Hendricks	2019	Western Indiana	2024	Western Indiana
Speedway	Speedway	Sparkplugs		49; Marion	2010	West Central	2025	Hoosier Legends
Triton Central	Fairland	Tigers		73; Shelby	2012	Mid-Hoosier	2025	Hoosier Legends

1. Played in both ICRC and WRC for 2009–10 season.

== State championships ==
Cardinal Ritter Raiders (6)

- 1977 Football (1A)
- 2003 Football (1A)
- 2008 Football (1A)
- 2013 Football (2A)
- 2016 Football (2A)
- 2017 Baseball (2A)

Covenant Christian Warriors (2)

- 2020 Football (1A)
- 2024 Boys Soccer (1A)

Greenwood Christian Cougars (0)

Heritage Christian Eagles (13)

- 2006 Girls Basketball (2A)
- 2007 Girls Basketball (2A)
- 2008 Girls Basketball (2A)
- 2008 Football (2A)
- 2009 Girls Basketball (2A)
- 2009 Baseball (2A)
- 2010 Baseball (2A)
- 2014 Girls Basketball (2A)
- 2015 Girls Basketball (2A)
- 2016 Girls Basketball (3A)
- 2019 Girls Volleyball (2A)
- 2021 Girls Soccer (1A)
- 2025 Girls Soccer (1A)

Lutheran Saints (8)

- 2004 Softball (1A)
- 2007 Softball (1A)
- 2019 Softball (1A)
- 2021 Football (1A)
- 2022 Football (1A)
- 2023 Boys Basketball (1A)
- 2023 Football (1A)
- 2025 Baseball (1A)

Scecina Memorial Crusaders (5)

- 1990 Football (2A)
- 1991 Football (2A)
- 2007 Softball (2A)
- 2013 Softball (2A)
- 2017 Softball (2A)

== Resources ==
- Indiana Crossroads Conference
- IHSAA
- IHSAA Conferences
- School Directory
