= Hoosier Legends Conference =

Athletic conference in Indiana, USA

- Founded: 2025
- First season: 2026–2027
- No. of teams: 8
- Region: IHSAA

Locations
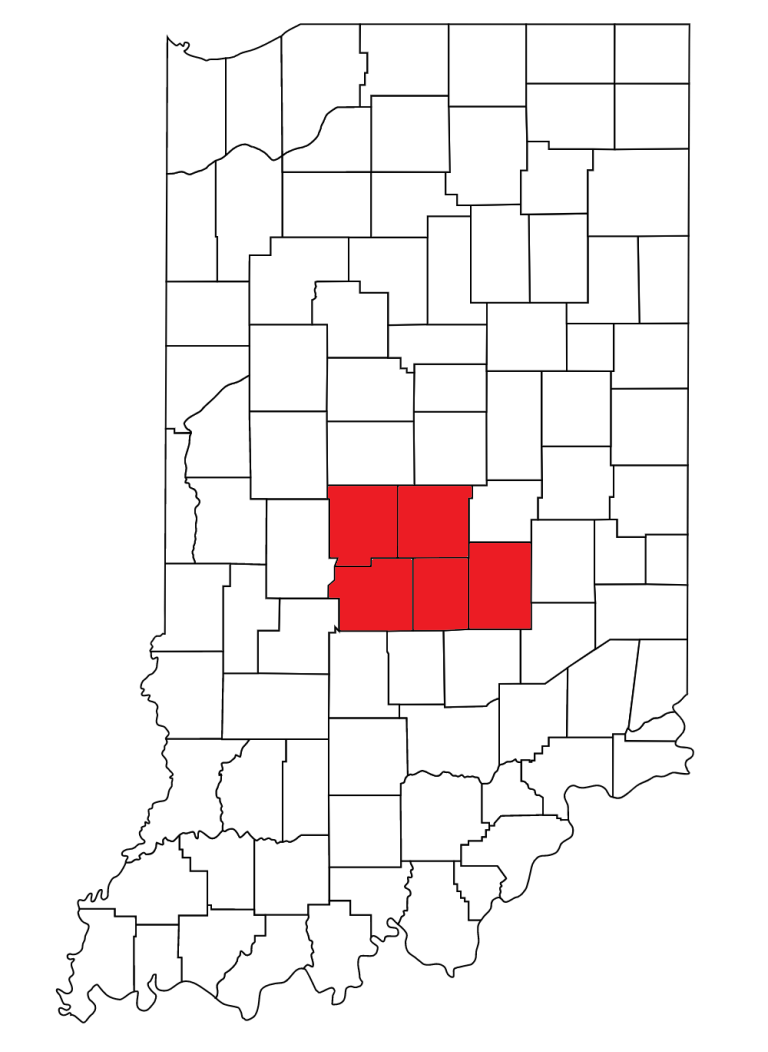

The Hoosier Legends Conference (HLC) is an eight-member IHSAA-sanctioned conference that began competition in the fall of 2025. The conference comprises suburban and rural schools from Hendricks, Johnson, Marion, Morgan, and Shelby counties.

The formation of the Hoosier Legends Conference was initiated by Tri-West after conference realignment within the Sagamore Conference brought higher enrollment schools from the Lafayette Metro Area. Tri-West left the conference due to competitive balance and enrollment shifts within the conference.

On August 14, 2024, the Hoosier Legends Conference was announced as Tri-West welcomed Beech Grove, Indian Creek, Monrovia, Speedway, and Triton Central. On October 17, 2024, Shelbyville announced their intention of joining the Hoosier Legends Conference, followed by Greenwood on October 22. All schools officially joined at the beginning of the 2025–26 academic year due to the IHSAA 2-year grace period rule for the protection of the conferences the schools are leaving.

== Membership ==
=== Charter Members ===
Beech Grove, Indian Creek, Monrovia, Speedway, Triton Central and Tri-West began conference play in the fall of 2025. Greenwood and Shelbyville will begin play in the 2026–2027 academic year.

School	Location	Mascot	Colors	Enrollment	IHSAA Class Football Class	County	Year Joined	Previous Conference
Beech Grove	Beech Grove	Hornets		892	4A	49; Marion	2025	Indiana Crossroads
Greenwood	Greenwood	Woodmen		1,211	4A	41; Johnson	2026	Mid-State
Indian Creek	Trafalgar	Braves		591	3A	41; Johnson	2025	Western Indiana
Monrovia	Monrovia	Bulldogs		503	2A	55; Morgan	2025	Indiana Crossroads
Shelbyville	Shelbyville	Golden Bears		1,093	4A	73; Shelby	2026	Hoosier Heritage
Speedway	Speedway	Sparkplugs		571	3A	49; Marion	2025	Indiana Crossroads
Tri-West	Lizton	Bruins		625	3A	32; Hendricks	2025	Sagamore
Triton Central	Fairland	Tigers		468	2A	73; Shelby	2025	Indiana Crossroads
