= Bishop Chatard High School =

Location
- 5885 Crittenden Avenue; Indianapolis, Indiana 46220; United States; 39°51′42″N 86°07′39″W

Information
- Type: Private, Coeducational
- Religious affiliation: Roman Catholic
- Established: 1961
- Oversight: Archdiocese of Indianapolis
- President: Bill Sahm
- Principal: John Hasty
- Teaching staff: 53.5 (on an FTE basis)
- Grades: 9–12
- Enrollment: 720 (2023-2024)
- Student to teacher ratio: 11:1
- Colors: Blue and white
- Athletics conference: Circle City Conference
- Nickname: Trojans
- Rivals: Brebeuf Jesuit Preparatory School; Cathedral High School; St. Theodore Guerin High School
- Accreditation: AdvancED
- Publication: Trojans Today
- Yearbook: The Citadel
- Website: www.bishopchatard.org

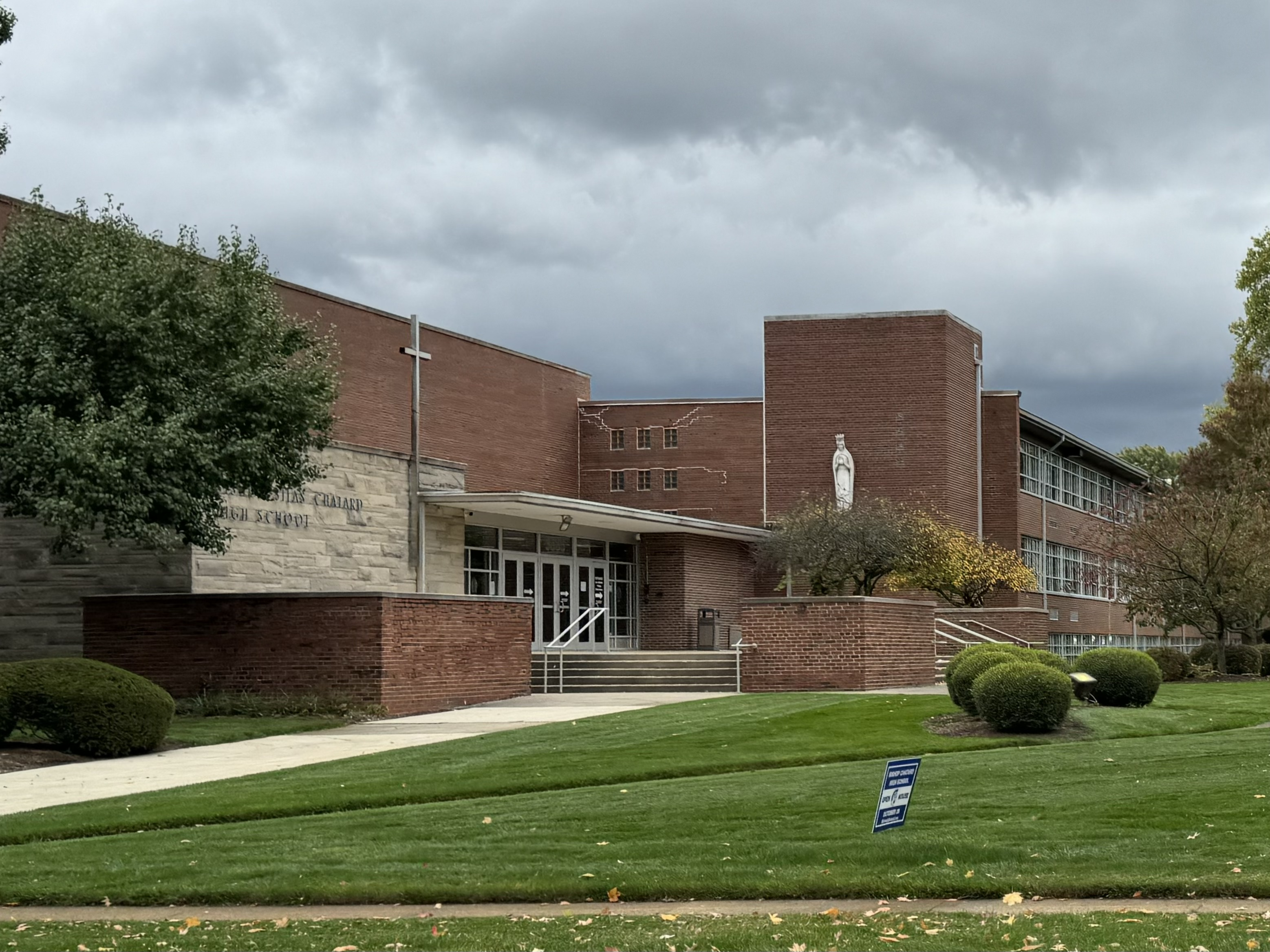
Bishop Chatard High School in October 2023.

Bishop Silas Chatard High School is a Catholic co-educational preparatory high school located in the Broad Ripple district of Indianapolis, Indiana, United States. It is named after Bishop Silas Chatard, who was the first Bishop of Indianapolis, and oversaw the movement of the diocese from Vincennes to Indianapolis in 1898.

== School history ==
The increase in Indiana's Catholic population that triggered the splitting of the Indianapolis diocese in 1944 also caused an increase in the need for Catholic schools. It was clear that one high school would not be sufficient to provide for Indianapolis' massively expanding Catholic population. To this end, the Archbishop of Indianapolis, Paul Clarence Schulte, ordered the construction of three new Catholic high schools in the city. The first of these, Bishop Chatard, would serve the north side of Indianapolis. The two other new schools, Roncalli High School and Cardinal Ritter High School, would serve the south and west sides of Indianapolis respectively. Scecina would continue to serve the east side of the city.

Ground was broken for the first of the schools, Bishop Chatard, in the fall of 1960 on diocese property at the corner of Crittenden and Kessler Avenues. Construction of the school and an adjacent convent was completed in less than a year, and the first students were admitted in September 1961. Each year a class of students was added to the school, and the first graduating class was the class of 1964–65.

Initially, classes were taught almost entirely by priests from the Archdiocese of Indianapolis and Benedictine Sisters of Beech Grove. Many sisters were housed in the convent on-site, but their numbers declined to the point that in the 1970s, their convent was converted to an annex of the school. The annex has served as classroom, office and storage space for thirty years, and was recently rededicated to the Sisters as the St. Benedict Center.

== Academics ==
Bishop Chatard has been accredited by AdvancED or its predecessors since April 2004.

== Athletics ==
The Bishop Chatard Trojans compete in the Circle City Conference. School colors are royal blue and white. The following Indiana High School Athletic Association (IHSAA) sanctioned sports are offered:

- Baseball (boys)
- Basketball (girls and boys)
  - Boys state championships - 2003
- Cross country (girls and boys)

Boys 2022 sectional champs

- Football (boys)
  - State championships - 1983, 1984, 1997, 1998, 2001, 2002, 2003, 2006, 2007, 2010, 2011, 2012, 2015, 2019, 2020, 2022, 2023
- Golf (girls and boys)
- Lacrosse (girls and boys)
  - Girls State Championships - 2026
- Soccer (girls and boys)
- Softball (girls)
- Swimming (girls and boys)
- Tennis - (girls and boys)
- Track - (girls and boys)
- Volleyball (girls)
  - State championships - 2004, 2012
- Wrestling (boys)

== Student activities ==
Chatard competes annually in the Brain Game, a quiz bowl program broadcast on local television. There are many fine arts programs, including a robust theatre program, concert band, pep band, concert choir, and the thespian society.

== Notable alumni ==
- Ryan Baker -NFL defensive end
- Cap Boso - NFL tight end
- Joe Holland - NFL linebacker
- Doug Jones - actor
- Bill Lynch - NCAA head football coach
- Nick Martin - NFL offensive center
- Zack Martin - NFL offensive guard
- Dray Mason - professional indoor football player
- Karen Pence - Second Lady of the United States
- Maris Valainis - actor
- Vincent Ventresca - actor
- Julie Scheidler - 2006 NSCAA high school All-American and Scholar All-American. Indiana NSCAA player-of-the-year. 2010 Notre Dame National Champion.

== See also ==
- List of schools in Indianapolis
- List of high schools in Indiana
