= Radley Haddad =

American baseball coach (born 1990)

- Coach
- Born: May 11, 1990 (age 35); Carmel, Indiana, U.S.
- Bats: Left Throws: Right

Teams
- As coach: Pittsburgh Pirates (2022–2025)

Radley W. Haddad (born May 11, 1990) is an American professional baseball coach who most recently served as the game-planning and strategy for the Pittsburgh Pirates of Major League Baseball (MLB).

== Playing career ==
Haddad attended Brebeuf Jesuit Preparatory School in Indianapolis. He was recruited to Western Carolina University, where he played college baseball for the Western Carolina Catamounts. After two years as a backup catcher with the Catamounts, Haddad transferred to Butler University to get more playing time. He was a starting catcher for the Butler Bulldogs for two years.

Haddad was not selected in the 2013 Major League Baseball draft, and signed with the New York Yankees as an undrafted free agent. He played in Minor League Baseball for the Yankees for four years. In 2016, he was a player-coach for the Staten Island Yankees. In 92 career games, he batted .203 with one home run.

== Coaching career ==
The New York Yankees hired Haddad as a bullpen catcher in 2017, ending his playing career.

On December 10, 2021, the Pittsburgh Pirates hired Haddad as a game planning and strategy coach. On May 9, 2025, the Pirates fired Haddad following the firing of Derek Shelton.
