= Circle City Conference =

American high school athletic conference

- Founded: 2016
- No. of teams: Bishop Chatard High School; Brebeuf Jesuit Preparatory School; St. Theodore Guerin High School; Roncalli High School

The Circle City Conference or CCC is a high school athletic conference located in Indianapolis, Indiana. All of the schools are members of the Indiana High School Athletic Association. The conference started competition at the beginning of the 2016–2017 school year following a crackdown by the IHSAA on several of the state's Catholic schools that were scheduling games against numerous teams located outside the state of Indiana. The first sporting event in the conference was a boy's varsity tennis match between Brebeuf Jesuit and Guerin Catholic that took place on August 18, 2016. The Golden Eagles defeated the Braves 4–1. As of August 2015, Greg VanSlambrook is the president of the conference. Combined, the schools have accounted for 88 IHSAA state championships.

== Membership ==
The conference currently consists of five coeducational private schools; four Catholic schools and one nondenominational Christian school in Greater Indianapolis.

School	City	Mascot	Colors	County	Enrollment 24–25	IHSAA Class	IHSAA Football Class	Year joined	Previous conference
Bishop Chatard	Indianapolis	Trojans		49; Marion	730	3A	4A	2016	Independents (opened 1961)
Brebeuf Jesuit	Indianapolis	Braves		49; Marion	829	3A	4A	2016	Independents (opened 1962)
Guerin Catholic	Noblesville	Golden Eagles		29; Hamilton	800	3A	3A	2016	Independents (opened 2004)
Roncalli	Indianapolis	Royals		49; Marion	1,082	3A	4A	2016	Independents (opened 1969)

=== Former members ===
School	Location	Mascot	Colors	County	Year joined	Previous conference	Year left	Conference joined
Covenant Christian	Indianapolis	Warriors		49; Marion	2018	Independents (opened 1997)	2024	Indiana Crossroads
Heritage Christian	Indianapolis	Eagles		49; Marion	2017	Independents (opened 1965)	2025	Indiana Crossroads

== State championships ==
The Indiana High School Athletic Association has awarded the schools the following state championships while they were members of the CCC:

Year	School	Sport
2016	Roncalli	Football
2019	Heritage Christian	Girls Volleyball
2020	Roncalli	Football
2021	Brebeuf Jesuit	Boys Soccer
2021	Brebeuf Jesuit	Boys Cross Country
2021	Brebeuf Jesuit	Girls Volleyball
2021	Roncalli	Softball
2021	Guerin Catholic	Boys Lacrosse
2022	Brebeuf Jesuit	Boys Soccer
2022	Bishop Chatard	Football
2022	Roncalli	Softball
2022	Guerin Catholic	Girls Lacrosse
2022	Guerin Catholic	Boys Golf
2023	Guerin Catholic	Girls Soccer
2023	Bishop Chatard	Football
2023	Brebeuf Jesuit	Boys Lacrosse
2023	Guerin Catholic	Girls Lacrosse
2023	Guerin Catholic	Boys Golf
2024	Roncalli	Girls Volleyball
2025	Roncalli	Boys Volleyball
2025	Guerin Catholic	Boys Lacrosse
2025	Guerin Catholic	Boys Soccer
2026	Guerin Catholic	Baseball
