= Jon Toth =

American football player (born 1994)

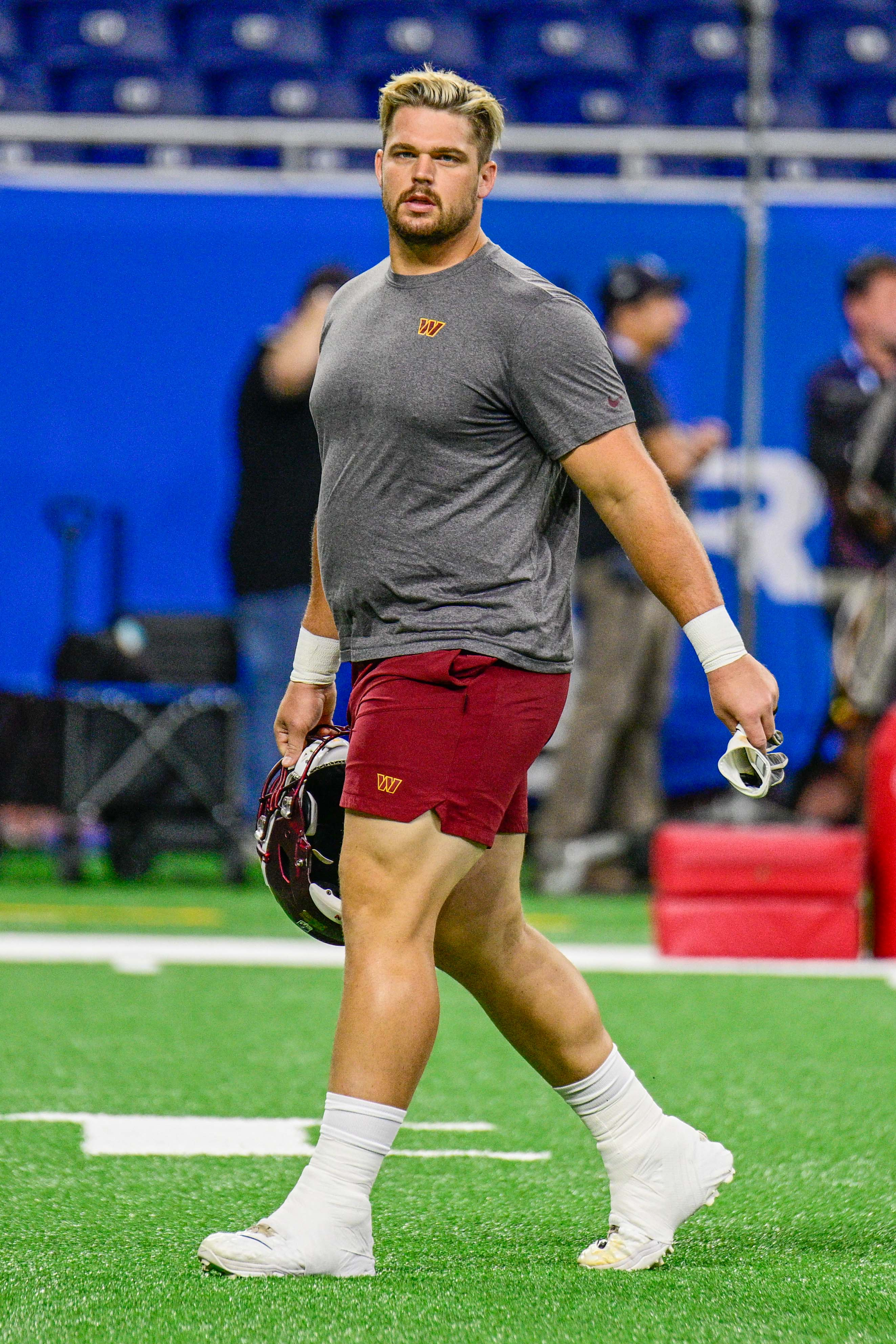
- Toth with the Washington Commanders in 2022

No. 64, 61
- Position: Center

Personal information
- Born: February 11, 1994 (age 32); Indianapolis, Indiana, U.S.
- Listed height: 6 ft 5 in (1.96 m)
- Listed weight: 308 lb (140 kg)

Career information
- High school: Brebeuf Jesuit (Indianapolis)
- College: Kentucky
- NFL draft: 2017: undrafted

Career history
- Philadelphia Eagles (2017–2018)*; New York Jets (2018–2019)*; DC Defenders (2020); Cleveland Browns (2020)*; Detroit Lions (2020)*; Washington Football Team / Commanders (2021–2022); St. Louis BattleHawks (2023)
- * Offseason or practice squad member only

Awards and highlights
- Second-team All-SEC (2016)

Career NFL statistics
- Games played: 6
- Stats at Pro Football Reference

Jon Toth (born February 11, 1994) is an American former professional football player who was a center in the National Football League (NFL). He played college football for the Kentucky Wildcats and was signed by the Philadelphia Eagles as an undrafted free agent in 2017. Toth has also been a member of the New York Jets, DC Defenders, Cleveland Browns, Detroit Lions, and Washington Football Team / Commanders.

== Early life and education ==
Toth was born on February 11, 1994, in Indianapolis, Indiana. He attended Brebeuf Jesuit Preparatory School there, playing football, basketball, lacrosse, and track and field. He was named to the Indiana Football Coaches Association all-state team as a senior, and was ranked as the number 33 best offensive guard by 247Sports.com.

After graduating from high school, Toth accepted a scholarship offer from University of Kentucky. As a true freshman, he sat out as a redshirt. Toth, in his second year, appeared in twelve games, starting the final eleven, and was named freshman All-SEC by league coaches. In addition to playing guard that year, he also saw time at the center position. He started all twelve games as a sophomore, and was named conference player of the week after the first game of the season. He again started every game as a junior. He finished his college career with 48 straight starts, a school record.

== Professional career ==
Pre-draft measurables
Height	Weight	Arm length	Hand span	40-yard dash	10-yard split	20-yard split	20-yard shuttle	Three-cone drill	Vertical jump	Broad jump	Bench press
6 ft 4 in (1.93 m)	307 lb (139 kg)	33.63 in (0.85 m)	10.0 in (0.25 m)	5.51 s	1.86 s	3.14 s	4.37 s	8.09 s	25.5 in (0.65 m)	8 ft 4 in (2.54 m)	21 reps
All values come from the NFL Scouting Combine.

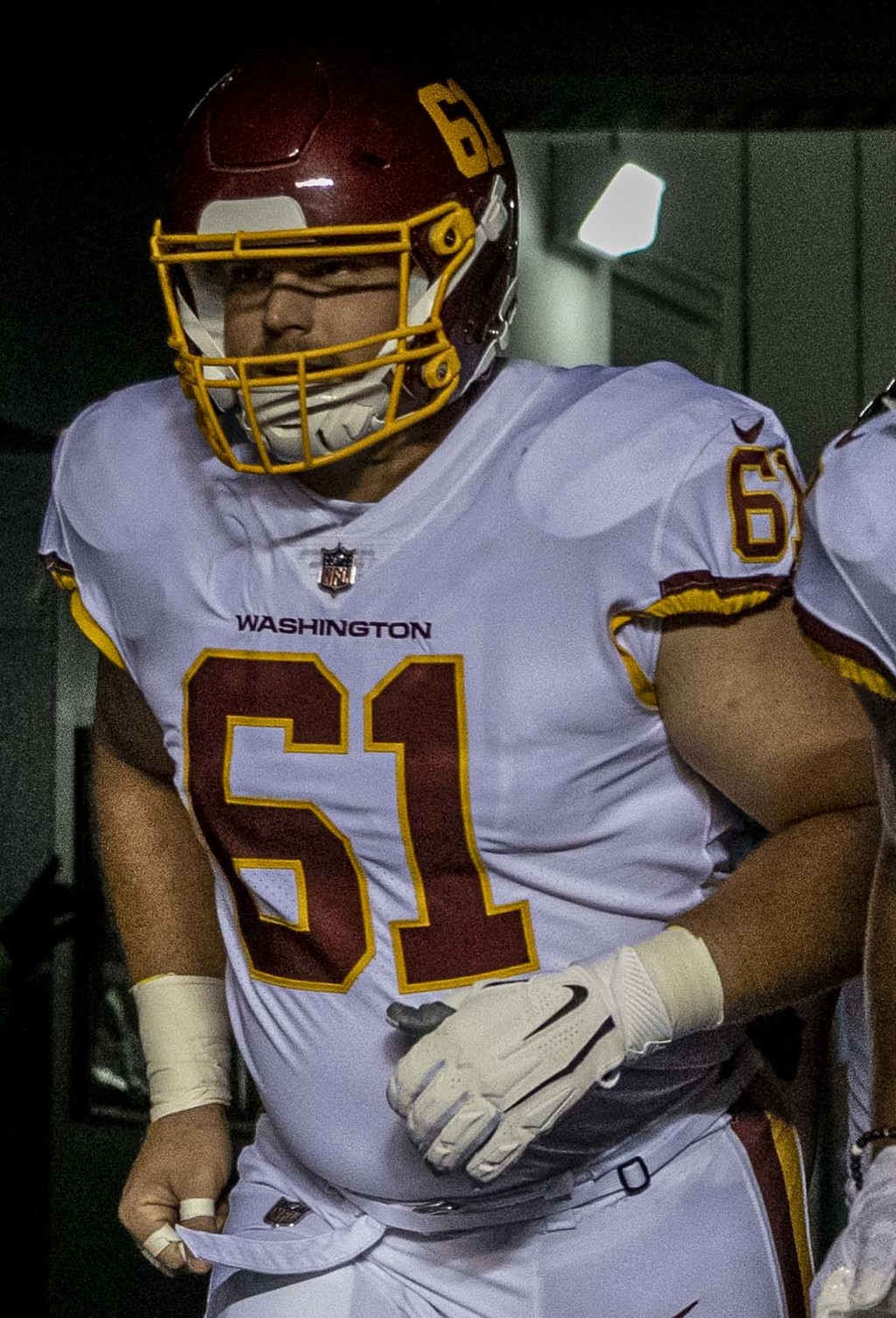
Toth in 2021

=== Philadelphia Eagles ===
After going unselected in the 2017 NFL draft, Toth was signed as an undrafted free agent by the Philadelphia Eagles on December 1, 2017, to the practice squad. He was released from the practice squad on December 26. He was re-signed on a reserve/future contract on January 9, 2018. While he was on a reserve/future contract, the Eagles beat the New England Patriots 41–33 in Super Bowl LII. He was released at the 2018 roster cuts and subsequently signed to the practice squad. He was released from the practice squad on September 25.

=== New York Jets ===
Toth was signed by the New York Jets to the practice squad on October 22, 2018. He was signed to a futures contract on December 31. He was released on August 31, 2019.

=== DC Defenders ===
Toth joined the DC Defenders of the newly-formed XFL in 2020, starting five games before the league suspended.

=== Cleveland Browns ===
Toth was signed by the Cleveland Browns on August 27, 2020, but was released a week later.

=== Detroit Lions ===
On December 22, 2020, Toth was signed to the practice squad by the Detroit Lions. He was released on January 11, 2021.

=== Washington Football Team / Commanders ===
Toth was signed by the Washington Football Team on August 9, 2021. He was waived on August 24 but re-signed two days later. He was then waived on August 31, re-signed to the practice squad one day later, and released again on September 8. He returned to the team on November 8, being signed to the practice squad. He was elevated to the active roster for their game against the Seattle Seahawks, and reverted afterwards. He was promoted to the active roster on December 11, 2021.

On August 30, 2022, Toth was waived by the Commanders and signed to the practice squad the next day. He was released again on October 4, 2022.

=== St. Louis BattleHawks ===
Toth was selected in the 2023 XFL draft by the St. Louis BattleHawks. He was released on August 16, 2023.

== Personal life ==
Toth has modeled for big-and-tall clothing brands.
