= John Young (Indiana politician) =

American politician

Member of the Indiana House of Representatives from the 47th district
- In office November 22, 2016 – November 22, 2022
- Preceded by: John Price
- Succeeded by: Robb Greene

Personal details
- Party: Republican
- Education: Indiana University Bloomington; Southern Illinois University School of Law

John Young is an American politician. He serves as a Republican member for the 47th district of the Indiana House of Representatives.

Young graduated from Indian Creek Senior High School in 1998. He received a bachelor of arts from Indiana University Bloomington in 2004 and a juris doctor from Southern Illinois University School of Law in 2009.

In 2016 he was elected for the 47th district of the Indiana House of Representatives, assuming office on November 9, 2016. In May 2022, Young lost his renomination bid for the State House to Robb Greene.
