= Robb Greene =

American politician

Member of the Indiana House of Representatives from the 47th district
- Incumbent
- Assumed office November 22, 2022
- Preceded by: John Young

Personal details
- Party: Republican
- Education: Indiana University–Purdue University Indianapolis

Robb Greene is an American politician serving as a member of the Indiana House of Representatives from the 47th district. He assumed office on November 22, 2022.

== Career ==
Greene earned a bachelor's degree in political science from Indiana University–Purdue University Indianapolis. Greene defeated John Young in the 2022 Republican primary and won the general election uncontested.

== Personal life ==
Greene graduated from Heritage Christian High School. Greene lives in Shelby County with his wife, Erin, and children, RG, Flora, and Lucy. Greene's son has autism.
