= St. Theodore Guerin High School =

Private, coeducational school in Noblesville, Indiana, US

Location
- 15300 Gray Road; Noblesville, Indiana 46062; United States; 40°00′37″N 86°05′11″W

Information
- Type: Private, Coeducational
- Motto: Lead with Humility, Serve with Love, Trust in Providence
- Religious affiliation: Roman Catholic
- Established: 2004
- Oversight: Diocese of Lafayette
- President: Deacon Rick Wagner
- Principal: Christine Williams
- Teaching staff: 65 (on an FTE basis)
- Grades: 9–12
- Enrollment: 802 (2025-2026)
- Student to teacher ratio: 12.0
- Campus type: Suburban
- Color
- Team name: Golden Eagles
- Rival: Brebeuf Jesuit Preparatory School
- Accreditation: AdvancED
- Publication: The Golden Quill
- Yearbook: Aquila
- Tuition: $17,900
- Website: www.guerincatholic.org

St. Theodore Guerin High School or simply Guerin Catholic High School is a Roman Catholic high school located in Noblesville, Indiana. The school's mascot is the Golden Eagle and school colors are purple and gold. It is part of the Roman Catholic Diocese of Lafayette in Indiana. The enrollment is mostly drawn from local north side suburban municipalities such as Carmel, Fishers, Noblesville, Westfield, and Zionsville.

== History ==
Founded in 2004, St. Theodore Guerin High School was named after the foundress of the Sisters of Providence, Saint Mother Théodore Guérin. Guerin Catholic was the first privately funded Catholic high school built in the state of Indiana in over thirty years. The first graduating class in 2007 consisted of 25 students, with 100% matriculating into four-year colleges.

== Academics ==
In the Fall of 2006, St. Theodore Guerin became the first Catholic high school in Greater Indianapolis to become a candidate to offer the International Baccalaureate Diploma Program.

St. Theodore Guerin has been recognized by The Cardinal Newman Society and the Catholic Education Honor Roll each year since 2008 as one of the United States "Top 50 Catholic High Schools." Guerin Catholic is one of only three Catholic high schools in the state of Indiana to receive this award. Catholic high schools that receive the honor roll designation are marked by excellence in academics and the integration of Catholic identity throughout all aspects of their educational and extracurricular programs. Less than five percent of the Catholic high schools in the United States receive this recognition.

The school was recognized by the United States Department of Education as a "Blue Ribbon School" for the 2024-2025 school year.

== Campus ==
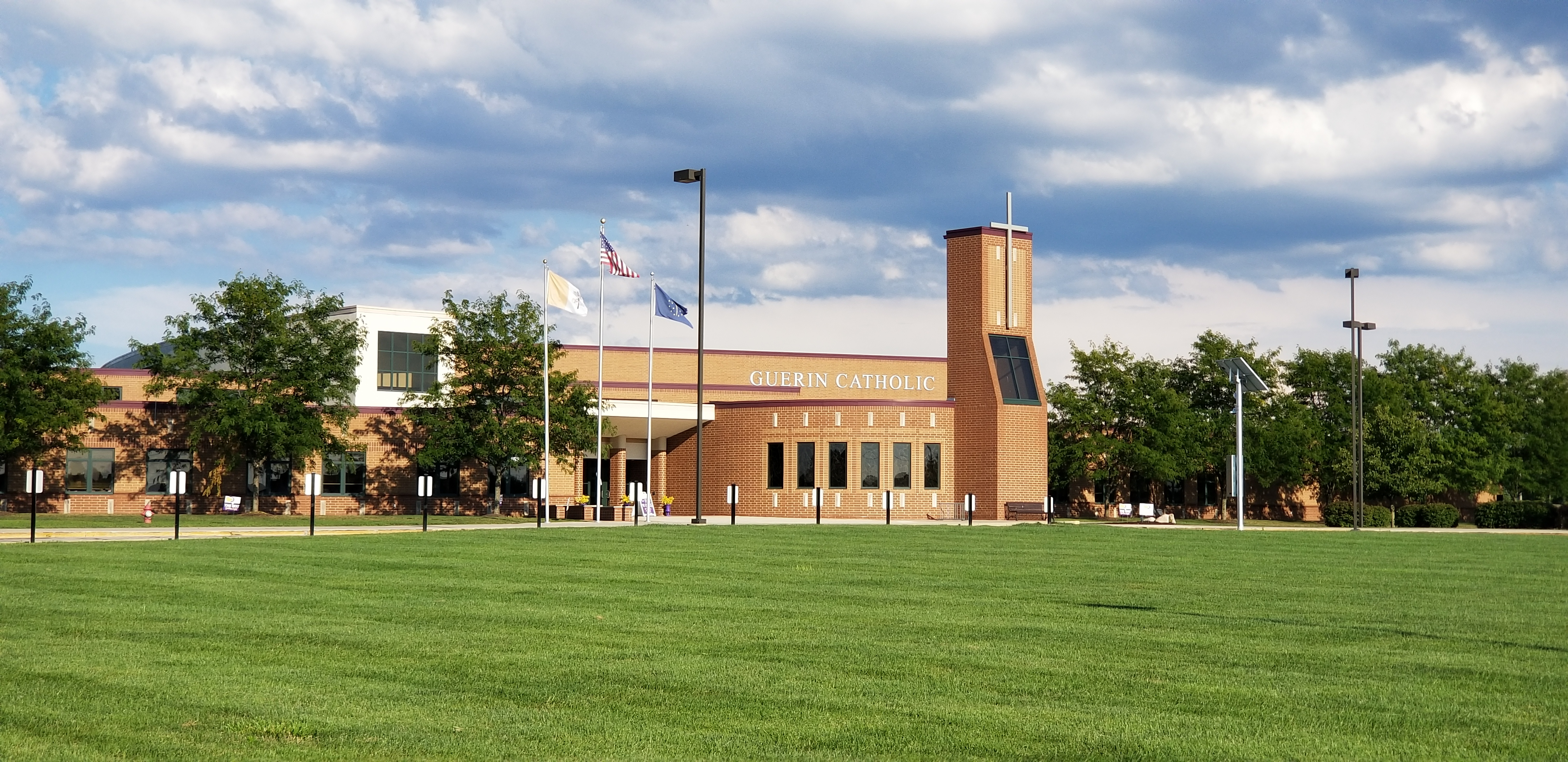
Guerin High School in 2020.

The school is located on seventy-two acres, one mile north of 146th street and Gray road, in the heart of Hamilton County.

The St. Joseph Chapel was dedicated in 2004. The chapel contains twelve stained glass windows depicting St. Junípero Serra, St. Elizabeth Seton, St. Martin de Porres, St. Katharine Drexel, Juliette Toussaint, Pierre Toussaint, St. Juan Diego, St. John Neumann, St. Kateri Tekakwitha, St. Frances Xavier Cabrini, St. Isaac Jogues, and St. Théodore Guérin. Daily Mass, Eucharistic adoration, and the Sacrament of Reconciliation are offered in the chapel for students, faculty, and staff.

The Grotto is located east of the main building. It was built in 2008 with Indiana limestone. The Grotto was dedicated and blessed by Bishop William Higi. The Grotto is used by its visitors as a sacred space for prayer, reflection and is the location of the school's annual May Crowning ceremony. In 2012, fourteen carvings portraying the Passion of Jesus Christ were installed along the sidewalk leading to the Grotto.

In 2011, Guerin Catholic had a growing enrollment and was in need of additional academic classrooms. On November 23, the school's community gathered for the groundbreaking of a new academic wing. The east academic wing was completed in August 2014, adding 24 classrooms to the campus.

St. Isidore Farm is the school vegetable farm. Students can sign up for regular farming time slots and earn one elective course credit.

In the spring of 2021, the school announced the Unite+Build+Soar Capital Campaign to build a new Fine Arts and Wellness Center. The 65,000 square foot addition includes a Fine Arts Auditorium with 500 seats, Athletic Fieldhouse with two new playing courts, expanded locker rooms, state of the art weight room, as well as additional academic and gathering spaces. The $26 million project was officially completed on October 3, 2025, with a ribbon-cutting ceremony and Mass to celebrate the feast day of St. Theodore Guerin.

== Athletics ==
The Guerin Catholic Golden Eagles are members of the Circle City Conference, but prior to 2016-2017 they were independent. The school colors are purple and gold. The following Indiana High School Athletic Association (IHSAA) sanctioned varsity sports are offered:

- Baseball (boys)
- Basketball (boys and girls)
- Cross country (boys and girls)
- Football (boys)
- Golf (boys and girls)
- Lacrosse (boys and girls)
- Soccer (boys and girls)
- Softball (girls)
- Swimming (boys and girls)
- Tennis (boys and girls)
- Track (boys and girls)
- Volleyball (boys and girls)
- Wrestling (boys)

=== Historic rivalries ===
St. Theodore Guerin is one of five major Catholic high schools located in Greater Indianapolis. This leads to a natural state of heightened competition between St. Theodore Guerin and the other Catholic high schools in the area: Bishop Chatard High School, Brebeuf Jesuit Preparatory School, Cathedral High School, and Roncalli High School.

The rivalry that is most prevalent is between Guerin Catholic and Brebeuf Jesuit. The schools are quite similar in that both are Catholic, college prep, co-educational high schools located on the north side of the Indianapolis metropolitan area. The proximity of the two schools, as well as their similar size enrollments, lead to both institutions drawing from the same student pool of boys and girls from north side grade schools.

=== State championships ===
The Indiana High School Athletic Association has awarded the school the following state championships:

- Boys' Baseball - 2026
- Boys’ Basketball - 2012, 2015
- Boys’ Golf - 2022, 2023
- Boys’ Lacrosse - 2021, 2025, 2026
- Girls’ Lacrosse - 2022, 2023
- Boys’ Soccer - 2013, 2014, 2025
- Girls’ Soccer - 2023

== See also ==
- List of high schools in Indiana
