= Joe Holland (American football) =

American football player (born 1988)

No. 30
- Position: Linebacker

Personal information
- Born: August 20, 1988 (age 38); Indianapolis, Indiana, U.S.
- Listed height: 6 ft 1 in (1.85 m)
- Listed weight: 231 lb (105 kg)

Career information
- High school: Bishop Chatard (Indianapolis)
- College: Purdue
- NFL draft: 2012: undrafted

Career history
- San Francisco 49ers (2012)*; Miami Dolphins (2012)*; Tampa Bay Buccaneers (2012−2013)*; San Francisco 49ers (2013)*
- * Offseason or practice squad member only
- Stats at Pro Football Reference

Joe Holland (born August 20, 1988) is an American former professional football player who was a linebacker in the National Football League (NFL). He was signed by the San Francisco 49ers as an undrafted free agent in 2012.

== Early life ==
Holland attended Bishop Chatard High School in Indianapolis, where he played football, basketball, and ran track. As a senior, Holland was named all-state, Indianapolis City Player of the Year and All-North Football Player of the Year after rushing for 2,048 yards on 239 carries and 35 touchdowns and added nine receptions for 153 yards (17.0 average) and one touchdown. He also returned nine punts for 137 yards (15.2 average) and returned three kickoffs for 124 yards (41.3 average) and one touchdown. He led his team to Class 3A state championship. His junior year, he totaled 2,257 rushing yards on 331 carries (6.8 average) and 32 touchdowns with 19 receptions for 239 yards (15.9 average). As a sophomore, he rushed for 961 yards on 144 carries (6.7 average) and 11 touchdowns. He set the school record for career rushing yards with 5,270 yards. He was named the 2007 city athlete of the year.

== College career ==
Holland played college football at Purdue University from 2007 to 2011. After redshirting his first year, Holland moved from safety to outside linebacker during training camp in 2008. He started at outside linebacker for the Boilermakers in 48 of the possible 49 games amassing 324 tackles (14th in school history) and 23.5 tackles for a loss for his career. Also excelling in the classroom, Holland was a two time Academic All American and in 2011 was one of eighteen players in the nation chose as a National Football Foundation Scholar Athlete. He was a captain of the 2011 team.

== Professional career ==
=== San Francisco 49ers ===
On May 4, 2012, Holland signed with the San Francisco 49ers as an undrafted free agent. On August 31, Holland was released by San Francisco.

=== Miami Dolphins ===
On October 16, 2012, Holland was signed to the Miami Dolphins' practice squad. On October 23, he was released after team signed Dominique Jones to the practice squad.

=== Tampa Bay Buccaneers ===
On November 14, 2012, the Tampa Bay Buccaneers signed Holland to their practice squad. On November 21, he was released from the practice squad. On November 28, Holland was re-signed to the Buccaneers' practice squad. On December 11, he was released from the practice squad for the second time. On December 18, Holland was once again re-signed to the practice squad.

On January 3, 2013, Holland was signed to a reserve/future contract by the Buccaneers. On August 21, he was waived by the Buccaneers.

=== San Francisco 49ers (second stint) ===
On August 22, 2013, the San Francisco 49ers claimed Holland off waivers from the Buccaneers.

== Personal life ==
Holland attended dental school at IUPUI in Indianapolis. He owns a dental practice in Zionsville, Indiana. He has two sisters.

Holland's cousin, Danny Etling, won Super Bowl LIII with the New England Patriots and currently serves as the assistant quarterbacks coach for the Washington Commanders.
