= Speedway Senior High School =

Public high school in Speedway, Indiana, US

Location
- 5357 West 25th Street; Speedway, Marion County, Indiana 46224; United States; 39.800834°N 86.252964°W

Information
- Type: Public high school
- School district: School Town of Speedway
- Principal: James P. Claybourn
- Teaching staff: 35.00 (FTE)
- Grades: 9-12
- Enrollment: 565 (2023-2024)
- Student to teacher ratio: 16.34
- Color
- Athletics conference: Hoosier Legends Conference
- Team name: Sparkplugs
- Website: Homepage

Speedway Senior High School is a public, secondary school in Speedway, Indiana (USA). It is part of the School Town of Speedway.

== Enrollment ==
- 2007-08 School Year: 532 students (preliminary)
- 2006-07 School Year: 504 students
- 2005-06 School Year: 487 students
- 2004-05 School Year: 455 students
- 2003-04 School Year: 472 students

== Demographics ==
There were a total of 504 students enrolled at Speedway Senior High School during the 2006–2007 school year. The gender makeup of the district was 51.79% female and 48.21% male. The racial makeup of the school was 71.03% White, 18.45% African American, 7.34% Hispanic, 1.79% Multiracial, 1.19% Asian, and 0.20% Native American. 34.33% of the school's students receive free or reduced lunch.

== Athletics ==
The Sparkplugs have two IHSAA state championships: boys basketball in 2002 and softball in 2018.

== Notable alumni ==
- Adedamola Ajani – college football offensive lineman for the Indiana Hoosiers
- Joyce DeWitt - actress known for Three's Company
- Shyron Ely - professional basketball player

== See also ==
- List of high schools in Indiana
- Hoosier Legends Conference
- Speedway, Indiana
