= Scecina Memorial High School =

Location
- 5000 Nowland Avenue; Indianapolis, Indiana 46201; United States; 39°47′12″N 86°05′07″W

Information
- Type: Private, Coeducational
- Religious affiliation: Roman Catholic
- Established: September 21, 1953
- President: Joe Therber
- Principal: Peg Dispenzieri
- Grades: 9-12
- Enrollment: 454 (2023-24)
- Color
- Athletics conference: Indiana Crossroads Conference
- Nickname: Crusaders
- Accreditation: North Central Association of Colleges and Schools
- Publication: The Red and Gold Show (Youtube)
- Website: www.scecina.org

Scecina Memorial High School is a Roman Catholic co-educational high school located on the East Side of Indianapolis, Indiana. It is named in honor of Fr. Thomas Scecina, a priest from Indianapolis who was killed in action during the Second World War.

== Athletics ==
The Scecina Memorial Crusaders are members of the Indiana Crossroads Conference. The school colors are cardinal red and gold. The following IHSAA sanctioned sports are offered:

- Baseball (boys')
- Basketball (girls' and boys')
- Cross country (girls' and boys')
- Football (boys)
  - State champions - 1990, 1991
- Golf (girls' and boys')
- Gymnastics (girls')
- Soccer (girls' and boys')
- Softball (girls')
  - State champions - 2007, 2013, 2017
- Swimming (girls' and boys')
- Tennis (girls'and boys')
- Track (girls' and boys')
- Volleyball (girls)
- Wrestling (boys')

== Notable alumni ==
- Michael Troy - swimming, 1960 Summer Olympics

== See also ==
- List of schools in Indianapolis
- List of high schools in Indiana
- Catholic secondary schools in Indiana
