= Heritage Christian School (Indianapolis) =

Private school in Indiana, United States

Coordinates: 39°53′17″N 86°03′33″W

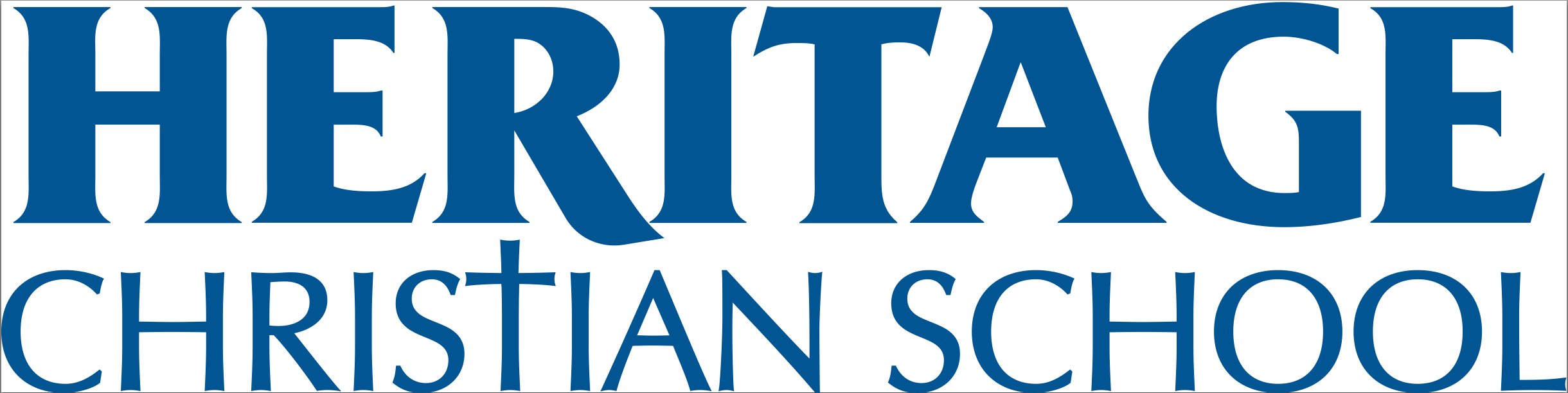

Location
- 6401 East 75th Street; Indianapolis, Indiana 46250; United States

Information
- School type: Private Christian day school
- Established: September 1965
- Faculty: approx. 290
- Grades: Preschool - 12
- Enrollment: approx. 1,700 (2026-2027)
- Campus: 42 acres
- Colors: Royal blue, white, grey
- Mascot: Eagle
- Rival: Covenant Christian High School
- Publication: Messenger Magazine
- Affiliation: Christian
- Website: www.heritagechristian.net

Heritage Christian School is a private Christian day school located in Indianapolis, Indiana, on the SE corner of Binford Boulevard and 75th Street, in the United States. There are currently approximately 1,700 students in preschool through 12th grade.

== School system ==
- Elementary School: Preschool – 4th grade
- Intermediate School: 5th – 6th grade
- Middle School: 7th – 8th grade
- High School: 9th – 12th grade

== Accreditation ==
Heritage Christian School is an independent Christian school and is fully accredited by the Association of Christian Schools International (ACSI) and the Cognia.

== Athletics ==
Heritage Christian School has been a member of the Indiana High School Athletic Association since 2001 and offers 19 varsity sanctioned sports as well as cheerleading and girls/boys lacrosse. The Eagles compete in the Indiana Crossroads Conference. Notable athletes include WNBA stars Tyasha Harris and Kelly Faris, Purdue University stars Myles Colvin (men's basketball) and Raven Colvin (women's volleyball), Butler University Elise Latham (2021 Indiana Lacrosse player of the year), and Butler University Ari Wiggins (women's basketball). HCS participates as a Class 2A school and have competed in and achieved success at multiple levels across a variety of sports. They are members of the Indiana Crossroads Conference.

State championships
Sport	Year(s)
Baseball (2)	2009, 2010
Girls basketball (7)	2006, 2007, 2008, 2009, 2014, 2015, 2016
Football (1)	2008
Girls soccer (2)	2021, 2025
Volleyball (1)	2019
Girls lacrosse (2)	2021, 2022
Diving (1)	2007
Boys soccer (1)	1977
Track and field (3)	2021, 2023, 2024

== Notable alumni ==
- Todd Abernethy - assistant basketball coach at Georgia
- Kent Brantly - American doctor and the 2014 Time Person of the Year
- Conor Daly - IndyCar driver
- Kelly Faris - American professional basketball player
- Robb Greene - Indiana House of Representative
- Tyasha Harris - American professional basketball player
- Dayo Okeniyi - Nigerian-American actor
- Jake Short - American actor

== See also ==
- List of schools in Indianapolis
