= Monrovia High School (Indiana) =

Location
- 205 South Chestnut Street; Monrovia, Morgan County, Indiana 46157; United States
- 39.575586°N 86.479152°W

Information
- Type: Public high school
- School district: Monroe-Gregg School District
- Principal: Mike Springer
- Faculty: 34.00 FTE
- Grades: 9-12
- Enrollment: 503 (2023-2024)
- Color
- Athletics conference: Indiana Crossroads Conference
- Team name: Bulldogs
- Website: Official Website

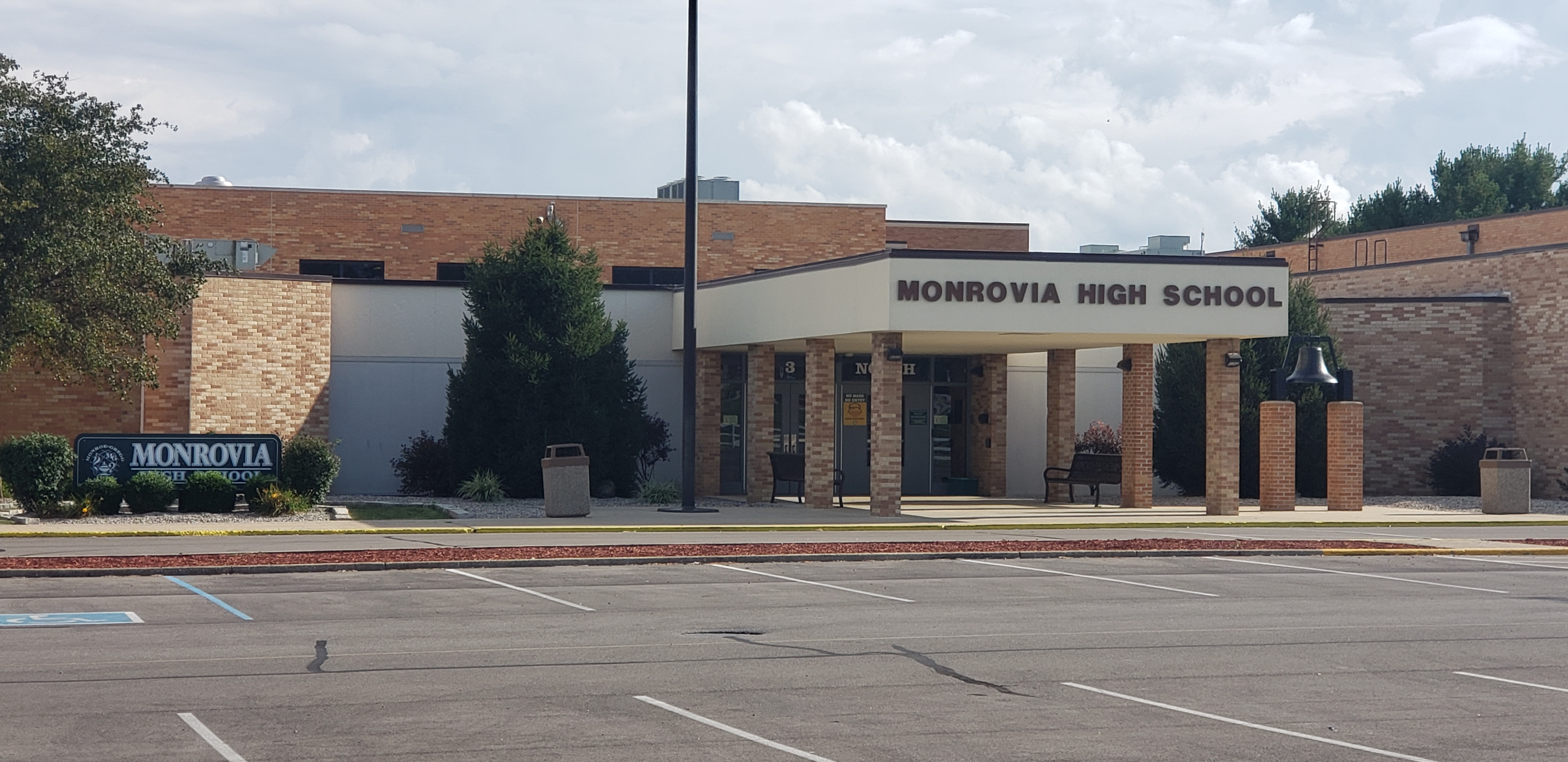
Monrovia High School in Indiana

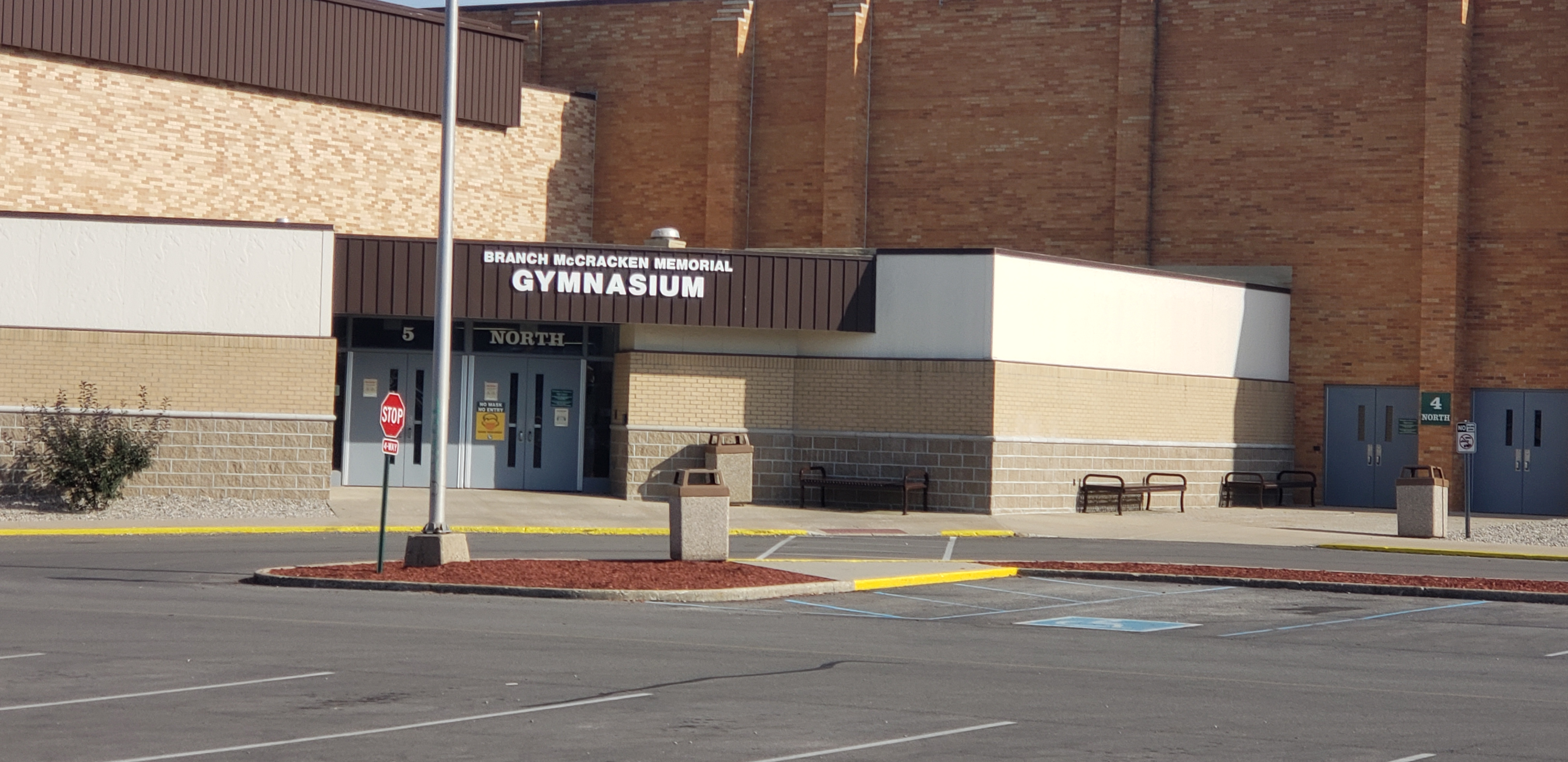
Branch McCracken Gymnasium

Monrovia High School is a public high school located in Monrovia, Indiana.

== Athletics ==
In 2014 Monrovia joined the Indiana Crossroads conference after previously being in the West Central conference. In 2015 the Bulldogs won the IHSAA football 2A Championship. Monrovia's gymnasium is named after legendary Indiana basketball coach and Monrovia alumni, Branch McCracken.

== Notable alumni ==
- Branch McCracken, former Indiana University basketball coach
- John Standeford, former wide receiver in the NFL
- Gary Bettenhausen, Indycar and NASCAR driver
- Tony Bettenhausen Jr., Indycar and NASCAR driver

== See also ==
- List of high schools in Indiana
