= Lutheran High School (Indianapolis) =

Lutheran High School of Indianapolis
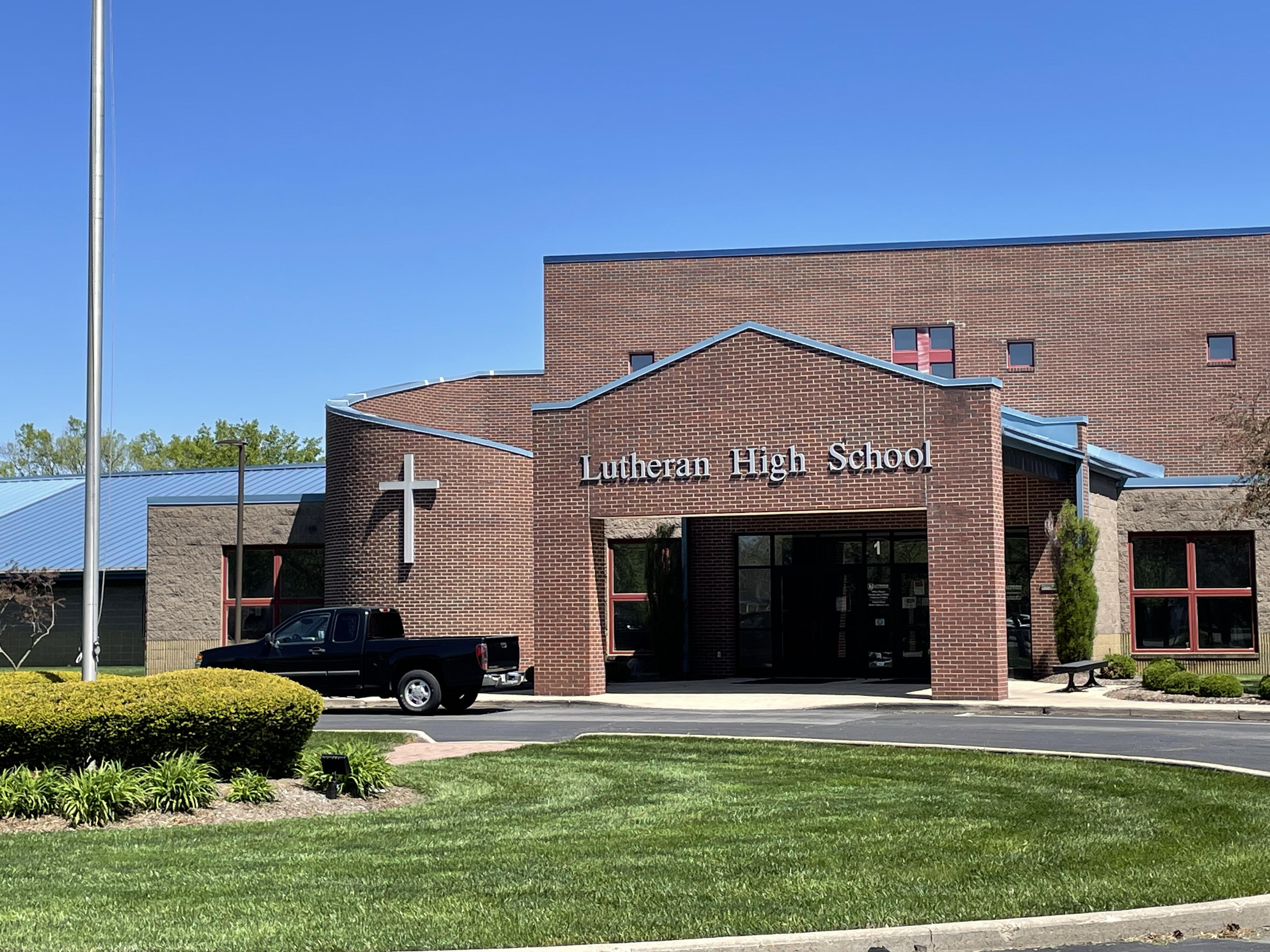
- Entrance of Lutheran High School of Indianapolis

Location
- 5555 South Arlington Avenue; Indianapolis, Marion County, Indiana 46237; United States; 39°41′15″N 86°03′44″W

Information
- Type: Private Secondary
- Motto: That we...may grow into Him in all things, which is the Head, that is, Christ
- Religious affiliation: Lutheran
- Denomination: Lutheran Church–Missouri Synod
- Established: August 30, 1976; 50 years ago
- School district: Greater Indianapolis Association for Lutheran Secondary Education
- CEEB code: 151716
- President: April Risk
- Dean: Dave Pasch
- Head of school: Mike Brandt
- Faculty: 15
- Grades: 9–12
- Enrollment: 267 (2023–24)
- Colors: Maroon and gold
- Athletics conference: Indiana Crossroads
- Mascot: "Louie" St Bernard
- Team name: Saints
- Accreditation: North Central Association
- Website: www.lhsi.org

The Lutheran High School of Indianapolis is a Lutheran secondary school in Indianapolis, Indiana, United States.

== History ==
The Lutheran High School of Indianapolis was conceived by a large group of Indianapolis area Lutherans in the early 1970s. By 1974, sufficient interest was in place to create The Greater Indianapolis Association for Lutheran Secondary Education, Inc. The association incorporated with the state of Indiana on February 14, 1975. The school's first principal, Kenneth Wunderlich, was called to serve July 2, 1975. He spent the first year laying the groundwork for opening the school for the 1976–77 school year. The doors opened August 30, 1976, for fourteen students in grades 9 and 10. The school first met in the former Franklin Township High School building (later demolished), renting it from the Franklin Township School District from 1976 to 1991. The current facility opened its doors on Arlington Avenue on May 1, 1991.

Carl Schulenburg and Richard Johnson were called to join Wunderlich as the school's first full-time faculty members. Pat Slater and Maria Tessler were hired as part-time teachers. The school's second principal, Richard Block, was called in 1985 and served until 2000. David Beringer served as executive director from 2000 to 2005. Gary St Clair was named principal in 2005. David Sommermeyer was named interim director in 2010. Mike Brandt was called to the position of director in the summer of 2011 and is to present.

Student enrollment in 2007–08 topped 300 students for the first time under the guidance of 30 full- and part-time faculty members. The graduation of the Class of 2008 saw the 1,200th alumnus cross the stage at commencement. Enrollment for the 2023–24 school year is 267.

== Athletics ==
Lutheran's athletic nickname is the Saints and they compete in the Indiana Crossroads Conference. They have won five state championships over the years.

IHSAA State Championships
Sport	Year(s)
Boys' Basketball (1)	2023
Football (3)	2021, 2022, 2023
Softball (3)	2004, 2007, 2019

IHSAA State Runner-Ups
Sport	Year(s)
Boy's Soccer (1)	2019
Football (1)	2020

== See also ==
- List of schools in Indianapolis
- List of high schools in Indiana
