= Brebeuf Jesuit Preparatory School =

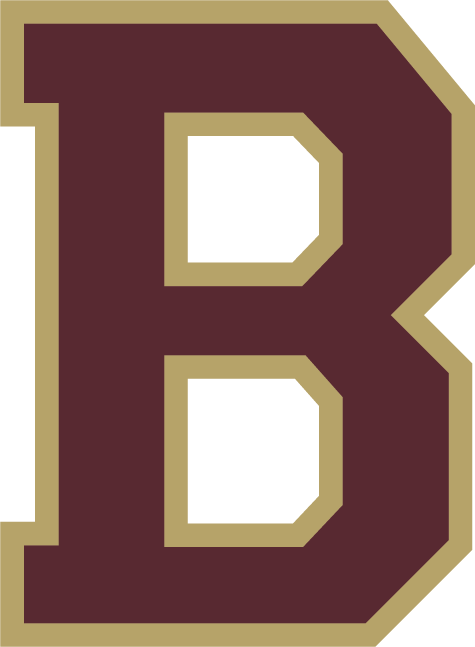

Location
- 2801 West 86th Street; Indianapolis, Indiana 46268-1925; United States; 39°54′37″N 86°12′35″W

Information
- Type: Private Roman Catholic
- Motto: Men and Women for Others
- Religious affiliation: Jesuit
- Patron saint: St. Jean de Brébeuf
- Established: 1962
- President: Jim Power
- Principal: Greg VanSlambrook
- Teaching staff: 73.1 (FTE)
- Grades: 9–12
- Gender: Co-educational
- Enrollment: 829 (2023-24)
- Student to teacher ratio: 11:1
- Campus size: 58 acres
- Colors: Maroon and Gold
- Athletics conference: Circle City Conference
- Mascot: Braves
- Rival: St. Theodore Guerin High School
- Accreditation: North Central Association of Colleges and Schools
- Publication: Manitou (literary magazine); Bylines (school magazine)
- Newspaper: The Arrow
- Yearbook: Totem
- Website: brebeuf.org

Brebeuf Jesuit Preparatory School is a Jesuit college-preparatory school on the northwest side of Indianapolis. Founded in 1962, the school is named in honor of Jean de Brébeuf, a French saint from the 17th century. Brebeuf Jesuit is part of the Midwest Province of the Society of Jesus and is rooted in the Ignatian tradition. The school is geographically located within the Archdiocese of Indianapolis.

== History ==
Founded in 1962, Brebeuf Jesuit was the vision of Fr. William Schmidt, SJ who wanted to open a Catholic secondary school to prepare city boys from Indianapolis for college. Fr. Schmidt, SJ chose the land, supervised the construction, and remained on hand for six years after the school opened to see it was run properly.

In the Fall of 1976, Brebeuf Jesuit officially became a fully operational coeducational institution when 153 young women enrolled as students. The decision to admit female students allowed the school to expand its mission and offer the distinctive academic opportunities of a Jesuit education to talented young women as well as young men. School leadership believed the admission of female students improved the campus culture and increased the quality of the student body.

In 2019, Charles C. Thompson, the Archbishop of Indianapolis, stated that the school would no longer be entitled to identify as Catholic, because administrators disobeyed him when renewing the contract of a teacher in a same-sex marriage. On September 23 of the same year, the Jesuits appealed his decision to the Congregation for Catholic Education in Rome, which temporarily rescinded Thompson's order. In 2020, the Holy See assigned Cardinal Joseph Tobin to mediate the dispute.

== Campus ==
Brebeuf Jesuit Preparatory School remains at its original location at 2801 West 86th Street. The campus sits on over 58 acres which includes 240,000 square feet of building space, on-site athletic facilities, and the Jesuit residence which is currently home to six Jesuits.

In 2009, Brebeuf Jesuit completed construction of the $7 million Mark G. Kite Wellness Center. The 42,000 square foot facility houses two weight rooms, three locker rooms, team meeting rooms, training room, gym, and athletic offices.

== Academics ==
Since the school is part of the Jesuit network that consists of 61 high schools and 28 colleges and universities in the United States, Brebeuf Jesuit provides an education infused with the tradition and philosophy of St. Ignatius of Loyola.

Brebeuf Jesuit offers a college-preparatory curriculum for all students, including a wide array of elective, AP, and Honors courses. The school's graduation rates are some of the highest in the state, boasting 99.5% of students in attendance graduating within four years, with 80% of those earning academic honors.

== Demographics ==
The demographic breakdown of the 816 students enrolled for the 2020–2021 school year was:

- White – 66.2%
- Black/African American – 15.4%
- Multiracial – 7.4%
- Hispanic – 6.4%
- Asian - 4.4%
- Hawaiian/Pacific islanders – 0.2%

== Athletics ==
Brebeuf Jesuit athletic teams are known as the Braves and compete as members of the Circle City Conference in the Indiana High School Athletic Association (IHSAA). The school has 29 varsity athletic teams, ranging from cross country to the newest addition, men's volleyball.

=== State Championships ===
Through the 2023–24 school year, the Braves have won 24 state championships across nine sports.

- Girls' Tennis - 1979, 1980, 1981, 1983, 1984
- Boys' Ice Hockey - 1991, 2001, 2006, 2013
- Boys' Basketball - 2000
- Girls' Volleyball - 2003, 2005, 2009, 2013, 2021
- Girls' Basketball - 2004, 2007
- Girls' Golf - 2006
- Boys' Golf - 2010, 2011
- Girls' Soccer - 2015
- Boys' Soccer - 2021, 2022
- Boys' Lacrosse - 2023

=== Rivalry ===
The main rivalry is with Guerin Catholic. The schools are quite similar in that both are Catholic, college prep, co-educational high schools located on the north side of the Indianapolis metropolitan area. The proximity of the two schools, as well as their similar size enrollments, lead to both institutions drawing from the same student pool of boys and girls.

== Notable alumni ==
- J. Murray Clark (1975) – Former Indiana State Senator and former Chair of the Indiana Republican Party
- Fred Glass (1977) – former Indiana University Athletic Director and former partner at Baker and Daniels.
- Radley Haddad (2008) - Baseball coach
- Alan Henderson (1991) – Retired basketball player
- Jay Higgins (2020) - Linebacker for the Iowa Hawkeyes
- Christopher L. Hodapp (1977) – Author and filmmaker
- Jim Hogshire (1976) – Author
- James Marten (2002) – Retired American football player.
- Alia Martin (2016) - Soccer player
- Rasheed Newson (1997) – Author and TV producer
- Ta'Shia Phillips (2007) – Retired basketball player
- Kevin Sumlin (1982) – Football coach
- John Daniel Tinder (1968) – Former Federal judge for the United States Court of Appeals for the Seventh Circuit (2007–2015)
- Jon Toth (2012) – NFL player

== See also ==
- List of schools in Indianapolis
- List of high schools in Indiana
