= Covenant Christian High School (Indianapolis) =

Private school in Indianapolis, Indiana, US

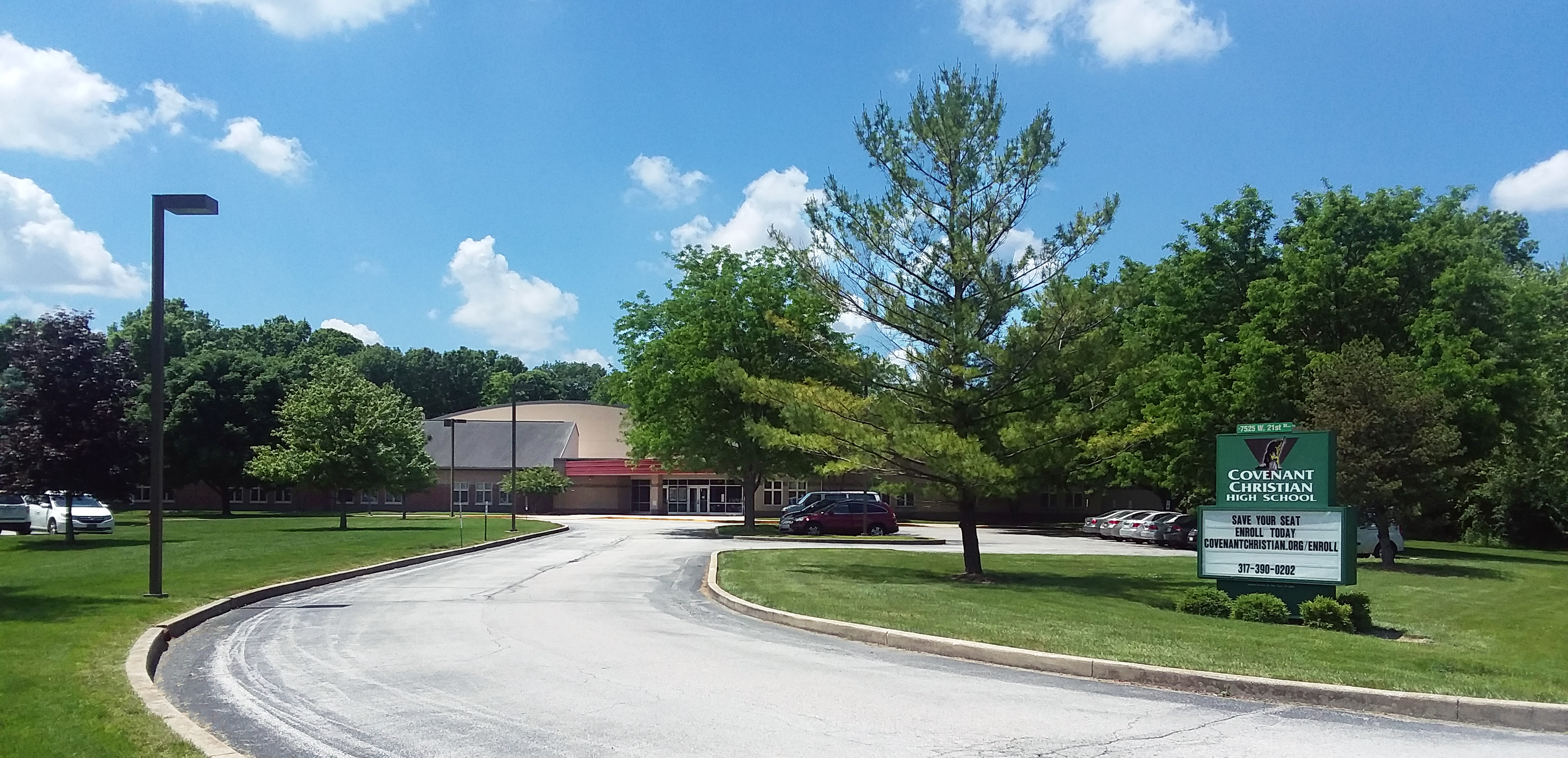

Location
- 7525 West 21st Street; Indianapolis, Marion County, Indiana 46214; United States; 39°47′34″N 86°17′35″W

Information
- Type: Private Christian High school
- Motto: Minds Enlightened, Hearts Inflamed, Lives Transformed
- Religious affiliation: Non-denominational Christian
- Established: 1995
- Principal: Andy Goodwin
- Staff: Adrian Pumphrey, Dean of Students; Jen Palmer, Academic Dean
- Faculty: 42
- Grades: 9–12
- Gender: Coeducational
- Enrollment: 415 (2025–2026)
- Student to teacher ratio: 10:1
- Colors: Burgundy and Forest Green
- Athletics: IHSAA
- Athletics conference: Circle City Conference
- Sports: volleyball (women's and men's); softball; baseball; tennis (men's and women's); golf (men's and women's); basketball (men's and women's); soccer (men's and women's); men's football; co-ed swimming; co-ed track and field; and co-ed cross country
- Team name: Warriors
- Accreditations: ASCI, IDOE, AdvancED
- Feeder schools: Indianapolis Christian Schools, Traders Point Christian Academy, The Oaks Academy
- Website: www.covenantchristian.org

Covenant Christian High School is a private, non-denominational, Christian high school in Indianapolis, Indiana, United States.

== History ==
Covenant Christian High School began in 1995 as a group of 16 freshmen meeting in the basement of Chapel Rock Christian Church on the west side of Indianapolis. Groundbreaking for the construction of a separate school building started in 1996 after a financial endowment from the locally based industrial technology firm Lastech. In 1997, the first classes were held in the building and the initial class graduated in 1999.

== Education ==
Covenant is a college preparatory school with Advanced Placement offerings and dual-credit partnerships with Indiana University and Taylor University, alongside technical education tracks in computer science and digital design.

== Awards ==
In March 2003, Covenant Christian High School was recognized by Christianity Today as the "Best Christian Place to Work" in the United States for the private schools category. The study was administered by the Best Christian Workplaces Institute and is the largest poll ever conducted on the attitudes of employees at Christian workplaces with more than 8,500 respondents. The school was given accreditation by the Association of Christian Schools.

== Athletics ==
Covenant Christian High School's mascot is the Warrior. Sports teams include volleyball (women's and men's), softball, baseball, tennis (men's and women's), golf (men's and women's), basketball (men's and women's), soccer (men's and women's), men's football, co-ed swimming, co-ed track and field, and co-ed cross country. Covenant Teams have advanced to the state finals in several sports, including, but not limited to, men's soccer, women's volleyball, and women's basketball. In the fall of 2020, the Warriors football team won the IHSAA State Final in Class 1A. Covenant has won several other tournaments and championships. It is part of the Circle City Conference in all sports except for football.

== Notable alumni ==
- Justin Knapp – Former English Wikipedia editor, first user to make more than one million edits

== See also ==
- List of schools in Indianapolis
- List of high schools in Indiana
