= Indiana High School Athletic Association =

Organization

Indiana High School Athletic Association (IHSAA)

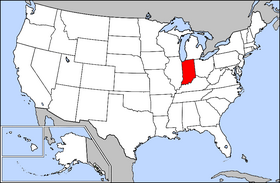
- Abbreviation: IHSAA
- Formation: 1903
- Type: Volunteer; NPO
- Legal status: Association
- Purpose: Athletic/Educational
- Headquarters: 9150 Meridian St. Indianapolis, IN 46240 US
- Region served: Indiana
- Members: 2024-25 Membership; 406 Total High School Members; 6 Provisional Members
- Commissioner: Paul Neidig
- Parent organization: National Federation of State High School Associations
- Affiliations: 51 High School Athletic Conferences
- Budget: 2025–26 $15,567,205
- Volunteers: 18
- Website: ihsaa.org
- Remarks: Phone: (317) 846-6601; Fax: 317-575-4244

The Indiana High School Athletic Association (IHSAA) is the arbiter of interscholastic competition among public and private high schools in the U.S. state of Indiana.

Member schools are classified into four classes based on enrollment, ranging from the smallest, 1A, to the largest, 4A. Some sports provide specific classifications, such as football (six classes) and soccer (three).

The IHSAA's boys and girls basketball tournaments, sometimes dubbed Hoosier Hysteria, are some of the oldest and best-attended state basketball tournaments in the United States.

== Structure ==
The IHSAA is divided into three board of director districts: northern, central, and southern. These districts elect three members each to the board of directors.

The northern district is composed of Adams, Allen, Cass, DeKalb, Elkhart, Fulton, Huntington, Jasper, Kosciusko, LaGrange, Lake, LaPorte, Marshall, Miami, Newton, Noble, Porter, Pulaski, St. Joseph, Starke, Steuben, Wabash, Wells and Whitley counties.

The central district is composed of Benton, Blackford, Boone, Clinton, Carroll, Delaware, Fountain, Grant, Hamilton, Hancock, Hendricks, Henry, Howard, Jay, Madison, Marion, Montgomery, Parke, Putnam, Randolph, Tippecanoe, Tipton, Vermillion, Warren, and White counties.

The southern district is composed of Bartholomew, Brown, Clark, Clay, Crawford, Daviess, Dearborn, Decatur, Dubois, Fayette, Floyd, Franklin, Gibson, Greene, Harrison, Jackson, Jefferson, Jennings, Johnson, Knox, Lawrence, Martin, Monroe, Morgan, Ohio, Orange, Owen, Perry, Pike, Posey, Ripley, Rush, Scott, Shelby, Spencer, Sullivan, Switzerland, Union, Vanderburgh, Vigo, Warrick, Washington and Wayne counties.

Select board of directors seats are reserved for female, minority, and urban representatives from special Northern and Southern Districts, as well as one private school representative.

== Sanctioned sports ==
| Sport | First IHSAA State Championship | Most Team Championships | Season |
|---|---|---|---|
| Baseball | 1910-11 | 8–Andrean, Lafayette Central Catholic, LaPorte (tie) | spring |
| Basketball (boys) | 1910-11 | 8–Marion, Muncie Central (tie) | winter |
| Basketball (girls) | 1975-76 | 7–Heritage Christian | winter |
| Cross Country (boys) | 1946-47 | 18–Carmel | fall |
| Cross Country (girls) | 1981-82 | 19–Carmel | fall |
| Football | 1973-74 | 17–Bishop Chatard (Indianapolis) | fall |
| Golf (boys) | 1931-32 | 7–Carmel | spring |
| Golf (girls) | 1973-74 | 11–Martinsville | spring |
| Gymnastics (girls) | 1972-73 | 13–Valparaiso | winter |
| Soccer (boys) | 1994-95 | 7–Canterbury (Fort Wayne) | fall |
| Soccer (girls) | 1994-95 | 10–Carmel | fall |
| Softball (girls) | 1984-85 | 7–Center Grove | fall |
| Swimming & Diving (boys) | 1927-28 | 22–Carmel | winter |
| Swimming & Diving (girls) | 1974-75 | 37–Carmel | winter |
| Tennis (boys) | 1967-68 | 21–North Central (Indianapolis) | fall |
| Tennis (girls) | 1974-75 | 12–Carmel | spring |
| Track & Field (boys) | 1903-04 | 20–Gary Roosevelt | spring |
| Track & Field (girls) | 1973-74 | 10—Fort Wayne Northrop | spring |
| Unified Flag Football | 2018-19 | 1—Bedford North Lawrence, Brownsburg, Carmel, DeKalb, McCutcheon, Mooresville (tie) | fall |
| Unified Track & Field | 2013-14 | 2—Valparaiso, Warsaw | spring |
| Volleyball (boys) | 2024-25 | 2-Roncalli | spring |
| Volleyball (girls) | 1972-73 | 23–Muncie Burris | fall |
| Wrestling (boys) | 1921-22 | 24–Bloomington South | winter |
| Wrestling (Girls) | 2024-25 | 1-Columbus; East | winter |

== Athletic Conferences ==
In the regular season, most of the member-schools' sports activities are governed by Indiana's high school athletic conferences. Some conferences only offer select sports, while others include all. Some schools maintain independence in certain sports, electing not to compete in a conference.

Some smaller sports are governed by other organizations in Indiana. For example, boys' ice hockey, which has fewer participating teams than other sports statewide, is under the auspices of the Indiana State High School Hockey Association (ISHSHA).

- Allen County
- Blue Chip
- Capital City
- Central Indiana
- Circle City
- Conference Indiana
- Duneland Athletic
- Eastern Indiana Athletic
- Great Lakes Athletic
- Greater Indianapolis
- Greater South Shore
- Hoosier
- Hoosier Crossroads
- Hoosier Heartland
- Hoosier Heritage
- Hoosier Hills
- Hoosier Legends
- Hoosier North
- Hoosier Plains
- Indiana Crossroads
- Indiana Northern State
- Metropolitan
- Mid-Eastern
- Mid-Hoosier
- Mid-Southern
- Mid-State
- Midwest
- Monon
- North Central
- Northeast 8
- Northeast Corner
- Northern Indiana
- Northern Lakes
- Northwest Crossroads
- Ohio River Valley
- Patoka Lake
- Pioneer
- Pocket
- Porter County
- Sagamore
- Southern
- Southern Indiana
- Southern Roads
- Southwest Indiana
- Summit
- Three Rivers
- Tri-Eastern
- Tri-River
- Wabash River
- Western Indiana

=== Sport-Specific Conferences ===
- Mid-Indiana (football)
- Southwest Seven (football)

=== Independents ===
- IHSAA Independents

== Controversy ==
In 2010, the association faced a state lawsuit over the scheduling of girls’ basketball games, which some programs believed disadvantaged girls’ teams by giving more favorable dates and times to boys’ programs. The association won the case when an Indiana judge ruled the schedule was not discriminatory.

== See also ==
- Hoosier Hysteria
- Largest high school gyms in the United States
- Arthur Trester
