= Western Indiana Conference =

Indiana high school athletic conference

- League: IHSAA
- Founded: 1999 (second incarnation)
- Sports fielded: 22 offered; men's: 10; women's: 10, and 1 unified
- No. of teams: 11 (8 in 2025-26, 9 in 2026-27)
- Region: 8 Counties (*9 in 2026-27): Brown, Clay, Johnson, Monroe, Owen Putnam, Sullivan, Vigo, Knox*
- Website: www.wicathletics.com

Locations
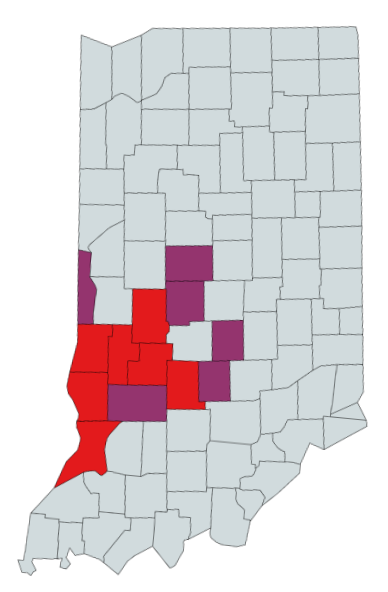

The Western Indiana Conference is the name of two IHSAA-sanctioned conferences based in West Central Indiana. The first formed as an eight-team league that formed as a basketball league in 1944 as the West Central Conference. The league started expanding in 1945 and changed its name to the Western Indiana Conference. With consolidation forcing many membership changes in the 1970s (including all the Terre Haute public schools), the conference folded at four members in 1983.

The second incarnation started in 1999, including four previous members (or their current incarnations) from the old conference, and three other schools from South Central Indiana. Its only change in membership in its first 16 years was in football, where South Vermilion played independently for the 2007 and 2008 seasons before rejoining the conference. March 2014 marked a sea change for the conference, as what originally was an invite for Greencastle turned into inviting the remaining five teams of the West Central Conference to join. All seven WIC schools and all five WCC schools voted to expand the conference into 2015, making a 12 team, two division league. All 12 schools are within 30 miles of Interstate 70 or Interstate 69.

Prior the invitation to Greencastle and other WCC schools went out, Indian Creek was rumored to be considered as an expansion candidate but their invitation was rescinded by the conference in early 2014 due to expanding to 12 teams. Eventually, South Vermillion departed to rejoin the Wabash River Conference in 2016 leaving the conference at 11 teams. Indian Creek was extended an invitation as the replacement for SV in 2017 and accepted bringing the conference back to 12 teams retaining the divisions model.

Since expansion to 12 teams, the conference membership has been less than stable due to long travel times and geographical issues spanning half of the state. After the 2018–2019 school year, Cascade departed from the Western Indiana Conference to join longtime rival and former West Central Conference member Monrovia in the Indiana Crossroads Conference. Cascade filled a vacancy that Park Tudor left. The move leaves the Western Indiana Conference will 11 schools, dissolving the east–west divisions for team sports, except football, going to round robin play.

In 2024–2025, Cascade was set to re-join the Western Indiana Conference when Covenant Christian joins the Indiana Crossroads Conference. Similarly, at this time, the four Putnam County schools were in discussions with Crawfordsville, North Montgomery, and Southmont to form a new athletic conference. After discussion and five schools voting to leave the Sagamore Conference, North Putnam announced on May 19, 2023, they will leave the Western Indiana Conference and join with five schools that separated from the Sagamore Conference, Crawfordsville, Frankfort, North Montgomery, Southmont, and Western Boone, to form the Monon Athletic Conference (MAC) that will take shape no later than the 2026–2027 academic year (later announced as the 2025-2026 year as the first year). Following the move by North Putnam to the new athletic conference, Cascade elected to withdraw their future membership and join the MAC instead. Meanwhile, Greencastle followed suit in leaving the WIC for the Monon Athletic Conference. These moves collectively leave the Western Indiana Conference with 9 members.

On May 7, 2024, the IndyStar reported that Indian Creek would leave the WIC to following the 2025–2026 academic year to create a new league with Sagamore castaway Tri-West and the four public schools from the Indiana Crossroads Conference: Beech Grove, Monrovia, Speedway, and Triton Central. These moves collectively leave the Western Indiana Conference with 8 members. This new conference will be called the Hoosier Legends Conference and will begin play in the 2025–26 academic year.

Following these moves as well, Cloverdale decided to move its football program to independent status while remaining in the WIC for all other sports.

Continued shifting and movement within Indiana high school conferences spelled another round of schools moving conferences. Vincennes Lincoln voted on January 13, 2025, to withdraw from the Southern Indiana Athletic Conference citing competitive imbalances and a need for a fresh start to competitive athletics. At the same time, the school board voted to apply for membership into the WIC. On January 20, 2025, a mere two days following their application, the Alices were unanimously voted to join the conference following the 2025–26 academic year. Furthermore, at this time Brown County has elected to move its football program to independent status as well. Following these moves, the WIC is left at nine member schools with seven sponsoring football within the conference.

Following the departure of Brown County's football program from the WIC, Brown County announced in late October their intentions to depart the conference completely and return to the Mid-Hoosier Conference as a full member in the 2026–27 school year.

== Members ==
Members departing for the Mid-Hoosier Conference on July 1, 2026.

School	Location	Mascot	Colors	Enrollment	IHSAA Class FB	County	Year joined	Previous conference
Brown; County	Nashville	Eagles		503	3A; 2A^{1}	7 Brown	1999	Mid-Hoosier
Cloverdale	Cloverdale	Clovers		313	1A; 1A^{1}	67; Putnam	2015	West Central
Edgewood	Ellettsville	Mustangs		802	3A; 4A	53; Monroe	1999	West Central
Northview	Brazil	Knights		955	3A; 4A	11; Clay	1999	independent
Owen; Valley	Spencer	Patriots		650	3A; 3A	60; Owen	1999	West Central
South; Putnam	Greencastle	Eagles		359	2A; 1A	67; Putnam	2015	West Central
Sullivan	Sullivan	Golden Arrows		472	2A; 2A	77; Sullivan	1999	Tri-River
West; Vigo	West Terre Haute	Vikings		525	2A; 2A	84; Vigo	1999	independent

1. Cloverdale and Brown County football will both be independent starting with the 2025–26 season with all other sports remaining in the WIC.

== Future member ==
School	Location	Mascot	Colors	Enrollment	IHSAA Class FB	County	Year Joining	Conference Leaving
Vincennes Lincoln	Vincennes	Alices		760	3A; 3A	42; Knox	2026	Southern Indiana

== Former members ==
School	Location	Mascot	Colors	County	Year joined	Previous conference	Year Departed	Conference joined
South Vermillion	Clinton	Wildcats		83; Vermillion	1999	Wabash River	2016	Wabash River
Cascade	Clayton	Cadets		32; Hendricks	2015	West Central	2025	Monon Athletic Conference
North; Putnam	Roachdale	Cougars		67; Putnam	2015	West Central	2025	Monon Athletic Conference
Greencastle	Greencastle	Tiger Cubs		67; Putnam	2015	West Central	2025	Monon Athletic Conference
Indian Creek	Trafalgar	Braves		41; Johnson	2016	Mid-Hoosier	2025	Hoosier Legends Conference

== Team sports divisions (2015–2019) ==
2015–16		2016–19	
East	West	East	West
Brown County	Greencastle	Brown County	Greencastle
Cascade	Northview	Cascade	North Putnam
Cloverdale	South Putnam	Cloverdale	Northview
Edgewood	South Vermilion	Edgewood	South Putnam
North Putnam	Sullivan	Indian Creek	Sullivan
Owen Valley	West Vigo	Owen Valley	West Vigo

With Cascade's departure from the Conference, the current Cross-Over system will be eliminated and all conference schools will play each other in the regular season of boys’ and girls’ basketball, baseball, softball, football, volleyball, boys’ and girls’ soccer, and boys’ and girls’ tennis. Boys’ and girls’ swimming and diving, track and field, cross country, wrestling, and golf will still hold one-day conference tournaments.

== Football divisions (2019–2024) ==
2019–2024
Gold	Green
Edgewood	Brown County
Indian Creek	Cloverdale
Northview	Greencastle
Owen Valley	North Putnam
Sullivan	South Putnam
	West Vigo

== Old conference membership ==
School	Location	Mascot	Colors	County	Year joined	Previous conference	Year left	Conference joined
Brazil	Brazil	Red Devils		11; Clay	1944	Clay County	1982	Independents (consolidated into Northview 1984)
James A. Garfield	Terre Haute	Purple Eagles		84; Vigo	1944	Vigo County	1971	none (consolidated into Terre Haute North)
Gerstmeyer Tech	Terre Haute	Black Cats		84; Vigo	1944	Vigo County	1971	none (consolidated into Terre Haute North)
Linton-Stockton^{1}	Linton	Miners		28; Greene	1944	Southern Indiana	1974	SW Indiana
State Lab^{2}	Terre Haute	Little Sycamores		84; Vigo	1944	Vigo County	1978	none (school closed)
South Vermillion^{3}	Clinton	Wildcats		83; Vermillion	1944	Vermillion County	1982	Wabash River
Sullivan^{4}	Sullivan	Golden Arrows		77; Sullivan	1944	Southern Indiana	1982	Independents (TRC 1986)
William H. Wiley	Terre Haute	Red Streaks		84; Vigo	1944	Vigo County	1971	none (consolidated into Terre Haute South)
Honey Creek	Allendale	Honey Bees		84; Vigo	1945	Vigo County	1971	none (consolidated into Terre Haute South)
Greencastle	Greencastle	Tiger Cubs		67; Putnam	1949	South Central	1977	West Central
Jasonville	Jasonville	Yellow Jackets		28; Greene	1949		1963	none (consolidated into Shakamak)
Dugger	Dugger	Bulldogs		77; Sullivan	1950	Sullivan County	1958	Sullivan County
Lebanon	Lebanon	Tigers		06; Boone	<1951		1967	Sagamore
Bishop Schulte^{5}	Terre Haute	Golden Bears		84; Vigo	1953	none (new school)	1977	none (school closed)
West; Vigo	West Terre Haute	Vikings		84; Vigo	1960	none (new school)	1982	Independent (WIC 1999)
Shakamak	Jasonville	Lakers		28; Greene	1963	none (new school)	1964	Tri-River
North; Knox	Bicknell	Warriors		42; Knox	1977	Blue Chip	1981	Independents (BCC 1986)

1. Linton-Stockton played concurrently in the WIC and the SIAC from 1944 to 1951.
2. State played concurrently in the WIC and the Tri-River Conference from 1964 to 1978.
3. South Vermillion was known as Clinton until 1977. The smaller schools in southern Vermillion County had consolidated into Clinton by 1963, but the school did not change its name right away (and kept Clinton's school colors and nickname), so this is considered a name change rather than an actual consolidation of schools.
4. Sullivan played concurrently in the WIC and the SIAC from 1944 to 1962.
5. Schulte played concurrently in the WIC and the Tri-River from 1964 to 1977.

== Champions ==
=== Football champions ===
This list includes champions for both the old and new versions of the conference. Spit championships are denoted by an asterisk, East and West Division champions are annotated by an E and W, respectively, while the conference championship game winner is denoted by a C. With the green and gold divisions, Gold Division Champion is denoted by GO and the Green Division Champion is denoted by GR.

#	Team	Seasons
14	Northview	2004, 2005, 2006, 2007, 2009, 2010, 2011, 2013, 2014, 2015 (W, C), 2018 (W, C), 2020 (GO), 2021 (GO), 2022 (GO)
8	Brazil	1949, 1950, 1969, 1972, 1975, 1977, 1978, 1981
8	Wiley	1947, 1948, 1953*, 1955*, 1960, 1961, 1962, 1965
6	Sullivan	1953*, 1955*, 2003*, 2012*, 2016 (W, C), 2017 (W, C)
4	Indian Creek	2016 (E), 2017 (E), 2018 (E), 2019 (E, C), 2023 (GO)
4	Bishop Schulte	1964, 1970, 1971, 1976
4	Owen Valley	1999, 2000, 2001, 2015 (E)
4	South Vermillion/Clinton	1952, 1974, 1979, 1980
3	Garfield	1946, 1954, 1957
3	Gerstmeyer Tech	1963, 1967, 1968
3	South Putnam	2020 (GR), 2021 (GR), 2022 (GR)
3	West Vigo	2002, 2003*, 2012*
2	Greencastle	1966, 1973, 2023 (GR)
1	Edgewood	2008
1	Linton-Stockton	1951
0	Cascade	
0	Cloverdale	
0	Dugger	
0	Honey Creek	
0	Jasonville	
0	Lebanon	
0	North Knox	
0	North Putnam	
0	Shakamak	
0	State Lab	

- Conference began football competition in 1946, and did not compete from 1982 to 1999. Champions for 1956 and 1958-9 are unknown.

==== Conference championship games ====
- 2015 Northview 28, Owen Valley 14
- 2016 Sullivan 63, Indian Creek 42
- 2017 Sullivan 48, Indian Creek 38
- 2018 Northview 32, Indian Creek 22
- 2019 Indian Creek 32, Northview 28

=== Swimming and diving champions ===
This list includes champions for the swimming and Diving Championships for the past three seasons of the conference. In 2023, in 2024, and in 2025. The following table denotes the number of championships each school in the conference has for both boys and girls starting from the 2022–2023 season.

#	Team	Boys Seasons	Girls Seasons
3	South Putnam	2023, 2024	2024, 2025
1	North Putnam	2025	
1	Edgewood		2023
0	Indian Creek		
0	Owen Valley		
0	West Vigo		
0	Greencastle		
0	Cloverdale		

==== Coaches of the year ====
For the winning teams, a coach of the year is determined

Year	Boys Coach Recipient	Girls Coach Recipient
2023	Edgewood: Jeff Kohne	South Putnam: Anna Kendall
2024	South Putnam: Anna Kendall	South Putnam: Anna Kendall
2025	North Putnam: Wesley Richardson	South Putnam: Anna Kendall

== Resources ==
- IHSAA Conferences
- IHSAA Directory
