= Monon Athletic Conference =

Athletic conference in Indiana, USA

- Founded: 2024
- First season: 2025–2026
- No. of teams: 8
- Region: IHSAA

Locations
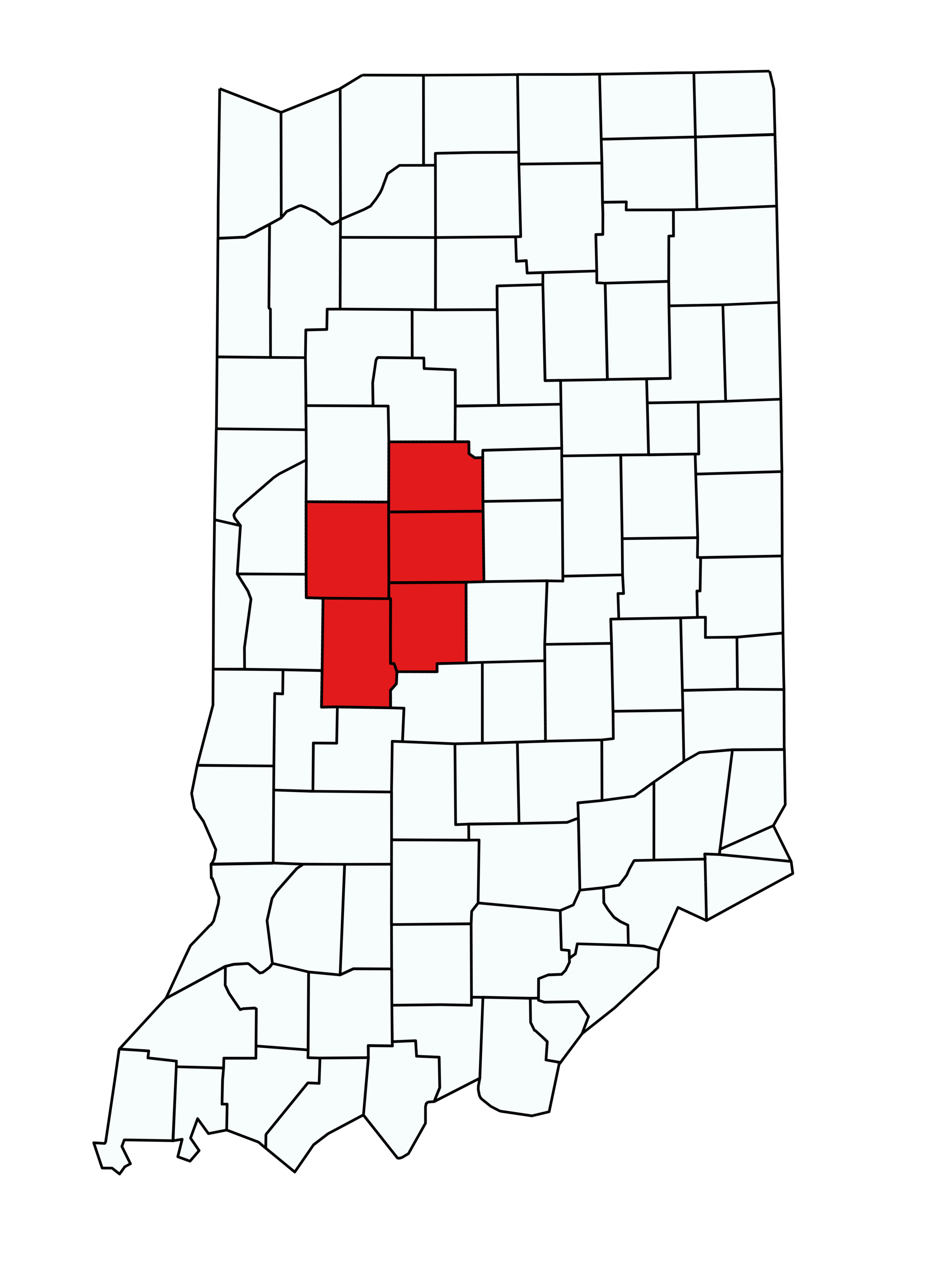

The Monon Athletic Conference (MAC) is an eight-member IHSAA-sanctioned conference in west central Indiana. The conference comprises class 2A and 3A schools from Boone, Clinton, Hendricks, Montgomery, and Putnam counties.

The Monon Athletic Conference set its foundation in 2023 after charter members Crawfordsville, Frankfort, North Montgomery, Southmont, and Western Boone formally separated from the Sagamore Conference (SAC) after the 2024–2025 academic year citing enrollment differences and growth levels between remaining SAC members Danville, Lebanon, and Tri-West. For stability, the conference considered a number of other schools for expansion to bring the league to eight members. North Putnam joined the league from the Western Indiana Conference (WIC) on May 19, 2023. Cascade, which was originally leaving the Indiana Crossroads Conference to re-join the WIC shifted course and joined the MAC on September 26, 2023, thus withdrawing their acceptance back into the WIC. Greencastle followed suit thereafter from the WIC formally following their September 2023 board meeting citing competitive balance and travel distance and costs as the primary reason for moving conferences. These moves collectively take the Sagamore Conference to three members and the Western Indiana Conference to nine members.

The name "Monon Athletic Conference" was introduced on February 22, 2024, following discussions by all league members as all eight members fall on or close to the path of the former Monon Railroad which connected Louisville and Indianapolis to Chicago.

== Membership ==
=== Charter members ===
All members will begin play in the 2025–2026 academic year.

School	Location	Mascot	Colors	Enrollment	IHSAA Class	County	Year Joined	Previous Conference
Cascade	Clayton	Cadets		546	3A	32 Hendricks	2025	Indiana Crossroads
Crawfordsville	Crawfordsville	Athenians		710	3A	54 Montgomery	2025	Sagamore
Frankfort	Frankfort	Hot Dogs		901	3A	12 Clinton	2025	Sagamore
Greencastle	Greencastle	Tiger Cubs		495	2A	67 Putnam	2025	Western Indiana
North Montgomery	Crawfordsville	Chargers		513	3A	54 Montgomery	2025	Sagamore
North Putnam	Roachdale	Cougars		432	2A	67 Putnam	2025	Western Indiana
Southmont	New Market	Mounties		453	2A	54 Montgomery	2025	Sagamore
Western Boone	Thorntown	Stars		513	3A	06 Boone	2025	Sagamore

=== Membership timeline ===
Full members Other conference

== Conference champions ==
=== 2025–2026 ===
FALL		WINTER		SPRING		ALL-SPORTS
Boys Cross Country	Cascade	Boys Basketball	Cascade & Greencastle	Baseball	Cascade & Greencastle	Girls Champion
Girls Cross Country	Western Boone	Girls Basketball	Southmont	Boys Golf	Greencastle	Boys Champion
Girls Golf	Western Boone	Boys Swim & Dive	Crawfordsville	Softball	Cascade	
Football	Cascade	Girls Swim & Dive	North Montgomery	Girls Tennis	Greencastle	
Boys Soccer	Greencastle	Boys Wrestling	Southmont	Boys Track & Field	Cascade	
Girls Soccer	Crawfordsville			Girls Track & Field	Crawfordsville	
Boys Tennis	Crawfordsville					
Girls Volleyball	Greencastle					

== State champions ==
=== Football ===
- 2025 - Cascade - Class 3A
