= Sagamore Conference =

Sagamore Athletic Conference
- League: Indiana High School Athletic Association (IHSAA)
- Founded: 1966
- Sports fielded: men's: 10; women's: 10, and unified: 1
- No. of teams: 4
- Official website: https://www.sagamoreconference.com

Locations
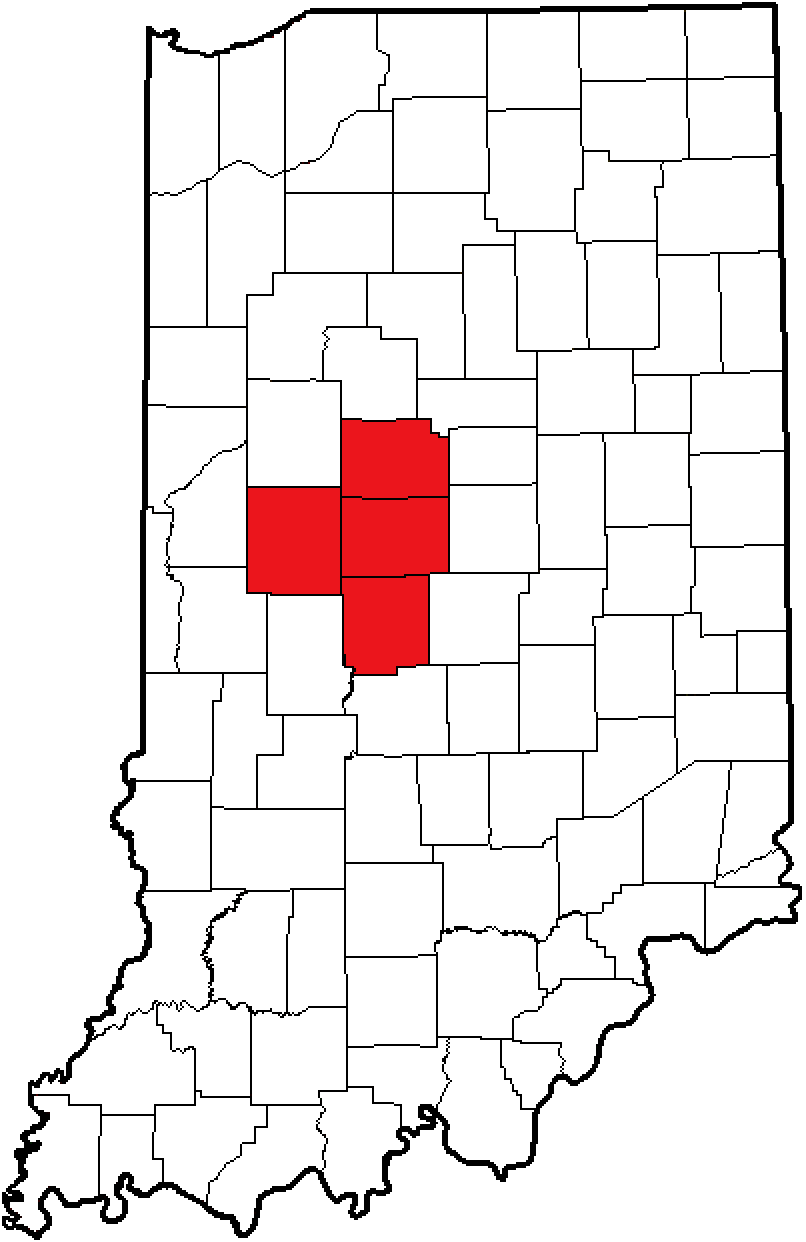

Sagamore Conference is a four-member IHSAA sanctioned athletic conference comprising 3A- and 4A-sized schools in Tippecanoe, Boone, and Hendricks Counties throughout Indiana.

The Sagamore Conference was founded in 1966 in Lebanon, Indiana, with a meeting between school officials from Brownsburg, Carmel, Crawfordsville, Frankfort, Lebanon, and Noblesville. The founders selected the name "Sagamore" after the Abnaki Indian tribe's name for "chief". The conference remained stable until Carmel withdrew in 1973 to establish themselves with other schools in then-class AAA and Noblesville followed suit in 1979. This did not stop the Sagamore, however, as North Montgomery was added in 1975, Western Boone in 1981, and Southmont in 1984. Brownsburg departed in 1985.

In 1995, the Sagamore executive council considered expansion. Several schools were mentioned but only two submitted written applications for membership. Starting in 1998, the Sagamore was engaged in discussions with Danville to become the seventh member of the conference and Tri-West was contacted joined the Sagamore to bring the league to eight members. Formally announced in the winter of 1998–1999, the Sagamore conference expanded to eight members. Since then, the conference membership remained stable despite conference realignment around the west central Indiana region the witnessed the formation and disbandment of many different conferences.

In 2023, serious discussions took place among the Sagamore schools outside of the Indianapolis metropolitan loop about forming a new athletic conference. Montgomery County schools had been in contact with Putnam County schools Cloverdale, Greencastle, North Putnam, and South Putnam about the formation of a new league. On May 10, 2023, citing enrollment and competitive balance, five Sagamore schools in Crawfordsville, Frankfort, North Montgomery, Southmont, and Western Boone notified the Sagamore Conference of their intent to separate from the Sagamore and form a new conference with a sixth member school to start as early as the 2024–2025 academic year but no later than the 2026–2027 academic year. Danville, Lebanon, and Tri-West will retain the Sagamore Conference name and history and will leave the conference with three member schools.

In early 2024, it was announced that both Harrison and McCutcheon would join the three remaining Sagamore schools, bringing conference membership to 5. This represents a dramatic shift in conference demographics, as both of the new schools are larger than the three remainders. It also represents a change in conference geography, as both Harrison and McCutcheon are located in West Lafayette, Indiana.

In late 2024, it was announced that both Terre Haute North and Terre Haute South will be joining the Sagamore Athletic Conference in 2026, bringing the member count to 6 teams. In addition to this, Tri-West will be departing from the conference in 2025.

In June 2025, the Vigo County School Corporation announced plans for the eventual merger of Terre Haute North and Terre Haute South. It is currently unknown how this will affect conference membership, nor how large the consolidated school will be as West Vigo High School is expected to take on new students. Any timeline for the consolidation is yet to be reported.

On December 9, 2025, it was announced that Lebanon will depart the Sagamore Conference and join the Hoosier Heritage Conference effective in the 2027–28 academic year.

== Membership ==
School departing for the Hoosier Heritage Conference in 2027.

School	Location	Mascot	Colors	Enrollment 2023–24	IHSAA Class	County	Year joined	Previous conference
Danville	Danville	Warriors		820	3A	32; Hendricks	1999	West Central
West Lafayette; Harrison	West Lafayette	Raiders		2,169	4A	79; Tippecanoe	2025	Independent
Lebanon	Lebanon	Tigers		1,033	4A	06; Boone	1967	Western Indiana
McCutcheon	Lafayette	Mavericks		1,786	4A	79; Tippecanoe	2025	Independent

=== Future members ===
School	Location	Mascot	Colors	County	Year joining	Previous conference
Terre Haute North	Terre Haute	Patriots		84; Vigo	2026	Conference Indiana
Terre Haute South	Terre Haute	Braves		84; Vigo	2026	Conference Indiana

=== Former members ===
School	Location	Mascot	Colors	County	Year joined	Previous conference	Year left	Conference joined
Brownsburg	Brownsburg	Bulldogs		32; Hendricks	1967	Mid-State	1985	Central Suburban
Carmel	Carmel	Greyhounds		29; Hamilton	1967	Capital District	1974	Olympic
Crawfordsville	Crawfordsville	Athenians		54; Montgomery	1967		2025	Monon Athletic Conference
Frankfort	Frankfort	Hot Dogs		12; Clinton	1967	North Central	2025	Monon Athletic Conference
Noblesville	Noblesville	Millers		29; Hamilton	1967	Independents (HCC 1965)	1980	Central Suburban
North; Montgomery	Crawfordsville	Chargers		54; Montgomery	1974	Wabash River	2025	Monon Athletic Conference
Southmont	New Market	Mounties		54; Montgomery	1985	Wabash River	2025	Monon Athletic Conference
Tri-West	Lizton	Bruins		32; Hendricks	1999	West Central	2025	Hoosier Legends Conference
Western; Boone	Thorntown	Stars		06; Boone	1983		2025	Monon Athletic Conference

== Conference championships ==
=== Football ===
#	Team	Seasons
11	Danville	1999, 2000*, 2001, 2002, 2005*, 2007, 2012*, 2017, 2020, 2021, 2024
10	Western Boone	1987*, 1988, 1990, 1997, 1998, 2012*, 2015, 2018, 2019, 2022*
9	Tri-West	2003, 2004, 2005*, 2012*, 2013, 2014, 2016, 2022*, 2023
7	Crawfordsville	1968, 1972, 1977, 1982, 1985*, 1989, 1991
7	Noblesville	1969, 1970*, 1971, 1974, 1975, 1978, 1979
6	Lebanon	1976, 1983*, 1985*, 1992, 1993, 2006
6	North Montgomery	1986, 1987*, 1994, 1995*, 1996, 2008
5	Brownsburg	1973, 1980, 1981, 1983*, 1984
4	Frankfort	1970*, 1987*, 1995*, 2000*
3	Southmont	2009, 2010, 2011
1	Carmel	1970*

=== Boys basketball ===
#	Team	Seasons
30	Lebanon	1970, 1974*, 1975, 1976, 1978, 1982, 1983, 1984, 1985*, 1986, 1987*, 1988, 1989, 1990*, 1991, 1992, 1997*, 1998, 1999, 2001*, 2002*, 2003*, 2004*, 2005*, 2011, 2012, 2013, 2016*, 2022*, 2023
14	Danville	2002*, 2003*, 2004*, 2005*, 2008, 2009*, 2010, 2014, 2015, 2016*, 2017*, 2020, 2021, 2024
13	Frankfort	1971, 1974*, 1977, 1979, 1985*, 1990*, 1994, 1995, 1996, 1997*, 2000, 2001*, 2009*
5	Crawfordsville	1968*, 1973, 1974*, 1987*, 2019*
5	Tri-West	2016*, 2017*, 2018, 2019*, 2025
4	North Montgomery	1990*, 2006, 2007, 2009*
3	Carmel	1968*, 1969, 1972
1	Brownsburg	1981
1	Noblesville	1980
1	Southmont	2022*
1	Western Boone	1993

=== Girls basketball ===
#	Team	Seasons
16	Lebanon	1981*, 1989*, 1998, 1999, 2000, 2001*, 2003*, 2005, 2006, 2007, 2011, 2012, 2013, 2014*, 2015, 2016
9	Danville	2003*, 2004, 2017*, 2018, 2019, 2020, 2023, 2024, 2025
9	Frankfort	1985*, 1989*, 1990, 1991, 1992, 1993, 1995, 2001*, 2002
6	North Montgomery	1979, 1980, 1981*, 1985*, 1988, 1989*
5	Western Boone	1986*, 1996, 1997, 2010, 2014*
3	Brownsburg	1982, 1983, 1984
3	Crawfordsville	1987, 2008, 2009
3	Tri-West	2017*, 2021, 2022
2	Southmont	1986*, 1994
0	Noblesville	

*Co-champions

== State championships ==
=== Crawfordsville (7) ===
- 1911 Boys Basketball
- 1919 Boys Track
- 1954 Boys Golf
- 1956 Boys Golf
- 1975 Girls Tennis
- 2008 Baseball (3A)
- 2011 Baseball (3A)

=== Frankfort (4) ===
- 1925 Boys Basketball
- 1929 Boys Basketball
- 1936 Boys Basketball
- 1939 Boys Basketball

=== Lebanon (4) ===
- 1912 Boys Basketball
- 1917 Boys Basketball
- 1918 Boys Basketball
- 2016 Softball (3A)

=== North Montgomery (2) ===
- 1995 Football (2A)
- 1996 Football (2A)

=== Tri-West Hendricks (5) ===
- 1996 Football (A)
- 2003 Football (2A)
- 2004 Football (2A)
- 2013 Softball (3A)
- 2014 Football (3A)

=== Western Boone (4) ===
- 1988 Football (2A)
- 2018 Football (2A)
- 2019 Football (2A)
- 2020 Football (2A)
