= Big Four Conference (Indiana) =

The Big Four Conference was an IHSAA-sanctioned conference that lasted from 1954 to 1971. The four denotes the counties that the schools hailed from (Boone, Hendricks, Montgomery, and Putnam counties). The Montgomery County Conference folded into the B4C in 1966, temporarily turning it into a 15-team superconference. However, with consolidations hitting Montgomery and Putnam counties hard, the conference folded five years later, as the Montgomery County schools folded into North Montgomery and Southmont High Schools, leaving only three schools.

== Members ==
School	Location	Mascot	Colors	County	Year joined	Previous conference	Year left	Conference joined
Bainbridge	Bainbridge	Pointers		67; Putnam	1955	Putnam County	1969	none (consolidated into North Putnam)
Belle Union	Belle Union	Panthers		67; Putnam	1955	Putnam County	1965	none (consolidated into Fillmore)
Granville Wells^{1}	Jamestown	Rockets		06; Boone	1955	Boone County	1971	Little 4
Ladoga	Ladoga	Canners		54; Montgomery	1955	Montgomery County	1964	Wabash River
New Market	New Market	Purple Flyers		54; Montgomery	1955	Montgomery County	1967	Wabash River
North Salem^{2}	North Salem	Blue Devils		32; Hendricks	1955	Hendricks County	1971	Little 4
Pittsboro^{2}	Pittsboro	Burros		32; Hendricks	1955	Hendricks County	1971	Little 4
Roachdale	Roachdale	Hawks		67; Putnam	1955	Putnam County	1969	none (consolidated into North Putnam)
Russellville	Russellville	Bees		67; Putnam	1955	Putnam County	1969	none (consolidated into North Putnam)
Dover	Dover	Blue Devils		06; Boone	1957	Boone County	1964	none (consolidated into Granville Wells)
Fillmore	Fillmore	Cardinals		67; Putnam	1964	Little 8	1969	none (consolidated into South Putnam)
Reelsville	Reelsville	Indians		67; Putnam	1964	Little 8	1969	none (consolidated into South Putnam)
Waveland	Waveland	Hornets		54; Montgomery	1964	Montgomery County	1971	none (consolidated into Southmont)
Alamo	Alamo	Warriors		54; Montgomery	1966	Montgomery County	1967	none (consolidated into New Market)
Darlington	Darlington	Indians		54; Montgomery	1966	Montgomery County	1971	none (consolidated into North Montgomery)
Linden	Linden	Bulldogs		54; Montgomery	1966	Montgomery County	1971	none (consolidated into North Montgomery)
New Ross	New Ross	Blue Jays		54; Montgomery	1966	Montgomery County	1971	none (consolidated into Southmont)
Waynetown	Waynetown	Gladiators		54; Montgomery	1966	Montgomery County	1971	none (consolidated into North Montgomery)

1. Was Jackson Township until 1956.
2. Concurrent with B4C and NCC 1955–65.
