= West Central Conference (Indiana) =

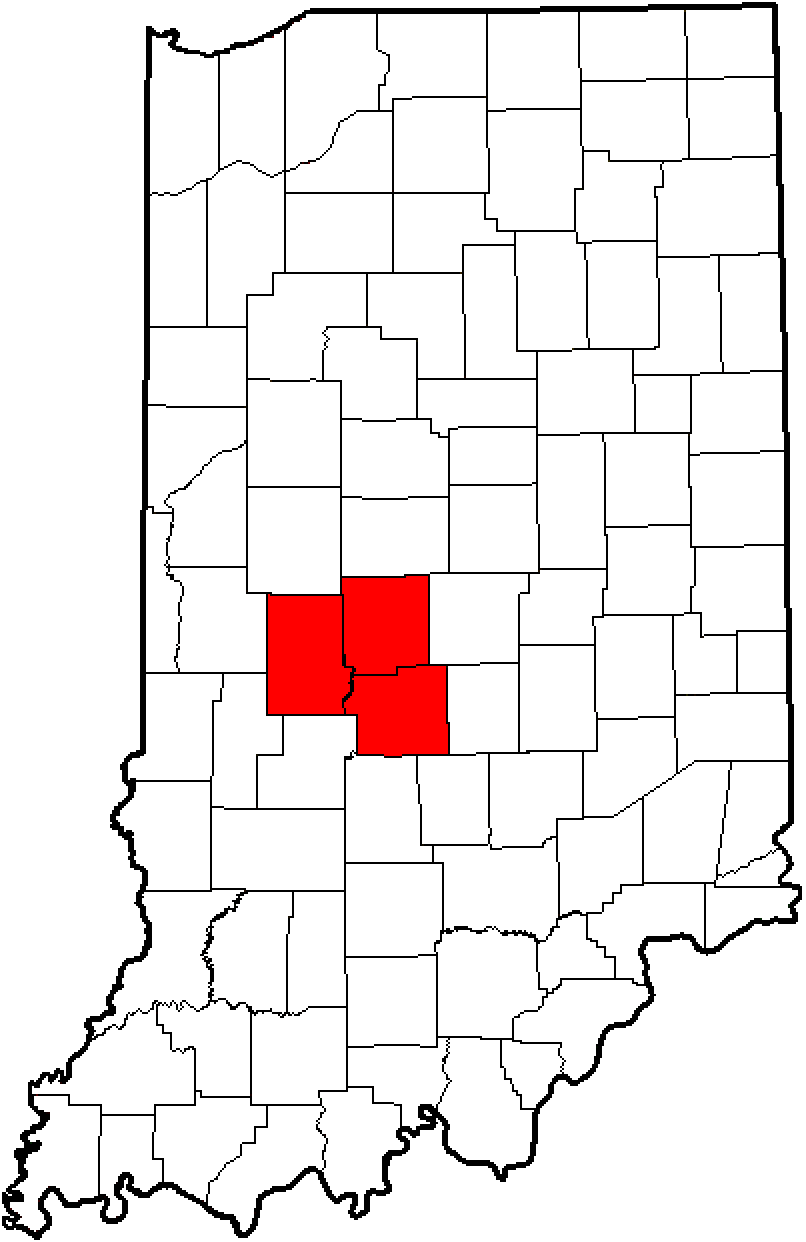
The West Central Conference in Indiana.

The West Central Conference was an IHSAA-sanctioned conference formed in 1970. The conference disbanded in 2015, as all five members joined the Western Indiana Conference.

== Membership ==
School	Location	Mascot	Colors	County	Year joined	Previous conference	Year left	Conference joined
Avon	Avon	Orioles		32; Hendricks	1970	Mid-Capital	1974	Mid-State
Cascade	Clayton	Cadets		33; Hendricks	1970	Independents (new school 1964)	2015	Western Indiana
Cloverdale	Cloverdale	Clovers		67; Putnam	1970	Independents	2015	Western Indiana
Edgewood	Ellettsville	Mustangs		53; Monroe	1970	SW Indiana	1999	Western Indiana
North; Putnam	Roachdale	Cougars		67; Putnam	1970	Independents (new school 1969)	2015	Western Indiana
Owen; Valley	Spencer	Patriots		60; Owen	1970	none (new school)	1999	Western Indiana
South; Putnam	Greencastle	Eagles		67; Putnam	1970	Independents (new school 1969)	2015	Western Indiana
Monrovia	Monrovia	Bulldogs		55; Morgan	1971	Independents	2014	Indiana Crossroads
Tri-West Hendricks	Lizton	Bruins		32; Hendricks	1975	none (new school)	1999	Sagamore
Greencastle	Greencastle	Tiger Cubs		67; Putnam	1977	Western Indiana	2015	Western Indiana
Danville	Danville	Warriors		32; Hendricks	1978	Mid-State	1999	Sagamore
[[Speedway High SchoolSpeedway]]	Speedway	Sparkplugs		49; Marion	1999	Mid-State	2010	Indiana Crossroads

== State championships ==
=== South Putnam (3) ===
- 1986 Football (A)
- 2011 Softball (2A)
- 2012 Softball (2A)

Monrovia 2015 Football (2A)

== State Runner-Up ==
=== Greencastle (2) ===
- 1931 Boys Basketball
- 1933 Boys Basketball

=== Monrovia (1) ===
- 2009 Football (2A)

=== North Putnam (1) ===
- 2010 Football (2A)

=== South Putnam ===
- 2002 Football (A)

== Resources ==
- IHSAA Conferences
- IHSAA Directory
