= Little Eight Conference (IHSAA) =

IHSAA-sanctioned conference (1955–1964)

The Little 8 Conference was an IHSAA-sanctioned conference from 1955 to 1964. The league included schools from Hendricks, Morgan, and Putman counties. The beginning of the end was 1963, when New Winchester closed, followed by three more schools the next year, effectively folding the conference.

== Members ==
School	Location	Mascot	Colors	County	Year joined	Previous conference	Year left	Conference joined
Amo^{1}	Amo	Aces		32; Hendricks	1955	Hendricks County	1964	none (consolidated into Cascade)
Clayton^{1}	Clayton	Cardinals		32; Hendricks	1955	Hendricks County	1964	none (consolidated into Cascade)
Cloverdale	Cloverdale	Clovers		67; Putnam	1955	Putnam County	1964	Independents (WCC 1970)
Eminence	Eminence	Eels		55; Morgan	1955	Tri-County (Central)	1964	Independents (L4C 1971)
Fillmore	Fillmore	Cardinals		67; Putnam	1955	Putnam County	1964	Big 4
New Winchester^{1}	New Winchester	Warriors		32; Hendricks	1955	Hendricks County	1963	none (consolidated into Danville)
Reelsville	Reelsville	Indians		67; Putnam	1955	Putnam County	1964	Big 4
Stilesville^{1}	Stilesville	Tigers		32; Hendricks	1955	Hendricks County	1964	none (consolidated into Cascade)
