= North Central Conference (Indiana) =

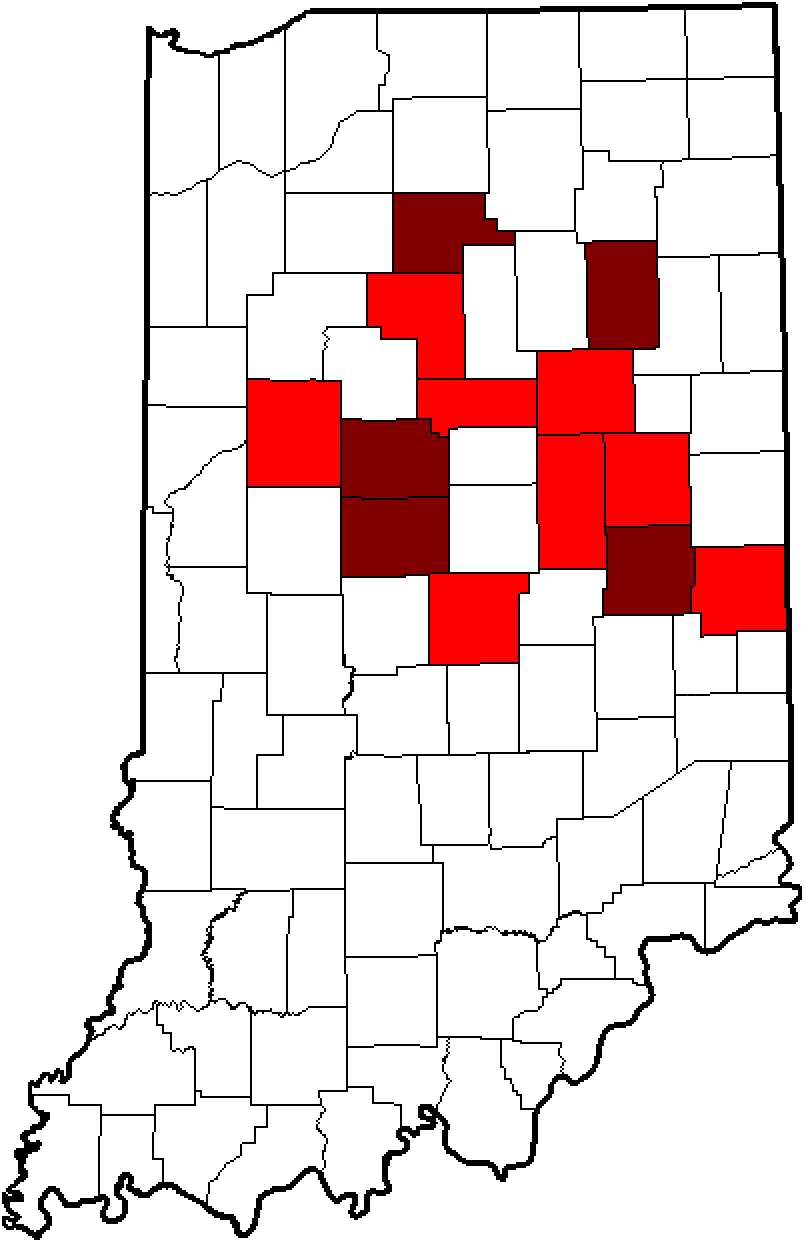
The North Central Athletic Conference in Indiana

The North Central Conference is an Indiana High School Athletic Association (IHSAA)-sanctioned athletic conference consisting of ten large high schools in Cass, Delaware, Grant, Howard, Madison, Marion, Tippecanoe, and Wayne Counties across Central and North Central Indiana. Most of these schools are in 35,000+ population towns like Anderson, Marion, Kokomo, Lafayette, Muncie, and Richmond. Several of the nation's largest gymnasiums belong to members of this conference.

== History ==
The Conference was formed on March 23, 1926, by 10 schools in the Central third of Indiana. Charter members were Anderson, Arsenal Tech of Indianapolis, Frankfort, Kokomo, Lebanon, Logansport, Muncie Central, New Castle, Richmond, and Rochester. With a couple of minor changes in the first decade (Lafayette Jeff replacing Rochester in 1930, and Marion replacing Lebanon in 1933), the conference membership remained unchanged, while the conference added more sports to its umbrella.

This changed in 1960, as Arsenal Tech was forced to join the IPS Conference, and Frankfort left to co-found the Sagamore Conference in 1967. The conference would continue on with the same eight members for the next 36 years while changes were happening in the communities outside the schools. Anderson, Kokomo, and Muncie would open up second and third city high schools, while consolidations in the rural areas outside of Lafayette would give Jeff two similar-sized local rivals. However, the economic crisis and industrial decline in the late 1970s and early 1980s hit many of these cities hard, as populations dwindled without anything replacing the lost manufacturing jobs. Anderson, Kokomo, and Muncie are now down to one high school each.

In the face of these population shifts, Lafayette Jeff joined the Hoosier Crossroads Conference in 2003, joining local rivals Harrison and McCutcheon, as well as the growing suburban schools outside of Indianapolis. Huntington North was brought in from the Olympic Conference as a replacement, where it had previously had conference rivals located in Muncie and Anderson.

New Castle elected to leave the NCC at the beginning of the 2013–2014 school year. They joined the Hoosier Heritage Conference in 2014. Huntington North left the NCC at the conclusion of the 2014–15 season to become a member of the Northeast Hoosier Conference. Lafayette Jeff rejoined the conference in 2014, bringing along fellow county schools Harrison and McCutcheon. Indianapolis Arsenal Tech rejoined the NCC as of April 1, 2015, but due to travel concerns, it will exit the conference at the end of the 2022–23 school year.

Marking another round of realignment, in early 2023 the conference announced restructuring and voted out West Lafayette Harrison and Lafayette McCutcheon following the 2023–24 school year. In addition, Logansport announced in May 2023 the Berries would leave the North Central Conference and join the Hoosier Athletic Conference and replace Lewis Cass following the 2023–2024 school year.

== Membership ==
School	Location	Mascot	Colors	County	Enrollment 24–25	IHSAA Class / Football	Year joined	Previous conference
Anderson	Anderson	Indians		48; Madison	1,722	4A/5A	1926	Independent
Kokomo	Kokomo	Wildkats		34; Howard	1,546	4A/5A	1926	Howard County
Lafayette; Jefferson^{1}	Lafayette	Bronchos		79; Tippecanoe	2,034	4A/5A	1931; 2014	Independent; Hoosier Crossroads
Marion	Marion	Giants		27; Grant	1,045	3A/4A	1933	Grant County
Muncie; Central^{2}	Muncie	Bearcats		18; Delaware	1,332	4A/4A	1926	Independent
Richmond^{3}	Richmond	Red Devils		89; Wayne	1,320	4A/4A	1926	Independent

1. Lafayette Jeff played in the HCC 2003–14.
2. Known as Muncie until 1963.
3. Known as Morton until 1948.

=== Former members ===
School	Location	Mascot	Colors	County	Enrollment	IHSAA Class /Football/Soccer	Year joined	Previous conference	Year left	Conference joined
Frankfort	Frankfort	Hot Dogs		12; Clinton	837	3A/3A/2A	1926	Independent	1967	Sagamore
Huntington; North	Huntington	Vikings		35; Huntington	1,750	4A/5A/2A	2003	Olympic	2015	Northeast Eight
Lebanon	Lebanon	Tigers		06; Boone	1,049	3A/4A/2A	1926	Independent	1933	Independent
New Castle; Chrysler	New Castle	Trojans		33; Henry	1,108	4A/4A/2A	1926	Independent	2013	Hoosier Heritage
Rochester	Rochester	Zebras		25; Fulton	564	3A/3A/A	1926	Independent	1931	Central Indiana
Arsenal Tech	Indianapolis	Titans		49; Marion	2,122	4A/6A/3A	1926; 2015	Independent; IPS	2023	Independent
Harrison (West Lafayette)	West Lafayette	Raiders		79 Tippecanoe	2,079	4A/5A	2014	Hoosier Crossroads	2024	Independent
McCutcheon	Lafayette	Mavericks		79; Tippecanoe	1,807	4A/5A	2014	Hoosier Crossroads	2024	Independent
Logansport	Logansport	Berries		09; Cass	1,252	4A/4A	1926	Cass County	2024	Hoosier

=== Membership timeline ===
Full members Other conference

== Divisions ==
Starting with the 2014 season, the NCC began divisional competition. This only applies in boys and girls soccer, boys and girls tennis, boys baseball, and girls softball.

East	West
Anderson	Harrison
Arsenal Tech	Kokomo
Marion	Lafayette Jeff
Muncie Central	Logansport
Richmond	McCutcheon

== Conference championships ==
=== Football ===
#	Team	Seasons
25	Richmond	1951, 1952, 1956, 1958*, 1962, 1963, 1967, 1970*, 1971, 1972, 1973, 1974, 1975, 1977*, 1978, 1985, 1989, 1991, 1992, 1994*, 1999, 2000*, 2001, 2012, 2013
20	Kokomo	1932*, 1939*, 1955, 1957*, 1960*, 1961, 1964, 1965, 1987*, 1993, 1994*, 1996, 2007, 2008, 2009, 2010, 2011,2015, 2016, state runner up 2017
17	Lafayette Jeff	1934*, 1936, 1937, 1943*, 1946, 1947, 1948*, 1950, 1966, 1979, 1980, 1981, 1982, 1994*, 1998, 2000*, 2017, 2018, 2019, 2020, 2024,2025
14	Muncie Central	1932*, 1933, 1934*, 1940, 1941, 1942, 1943*, 1944, 1945, 1953, 1954*, 2002, 2003, 2004
10	Marion	1960*, 1968, 1969, 1970*, 1986, 1987*, 1988, 1990, 1997, 2006*
7	Logansport	1958*, 1959, 1960*, 1977*, 1995, 2005, 2006*
5	Arsenal Tech	1939*, 1949, 1954*, 1957*, 1960*
5	New Castle	1935, 1938, 1948*, 1976, 1984
2	McCutcheon	2014, 2016
1	Anderson	1983
3	Harrison (WL)	2016, 2021, 2022
1	Huntington North	2006*
0	Frankfort	
0	Lebanon	
0	Rochester	

=== Boys basketball ===
#	Team	Seasons
21	Marion	1940, 1966, 1968,1969, 1975, 1977*, 1980, 1981, 1983, 1985, 1986, 1987, 1989, 1990*, 1991, 1998*, 1999, 2000*, 2007*, 2008*, 2009
20	Muncie Central	1927, 1928, 1929, 1938*, 1950, 1953, 1954, 1955, 1959, 1960, 1963, 1970*, 1978, 1994*, 2000*, 2004, 2005, 2007*, 2008*, 2012
19	Kokomo	1939, 1944, 1945, 1951, 1956, 1958, 1961, 1962, 1971*, 1976*, 1990*, 1994*, 1996, 2003*, 2010*, 2011, 2013, 2018, 2023
17	Anderson	1941, 1943*, 1949, 1965, 1973, 1974, 1976*, 1982, 1984, 1992, 1993, 1997*, 1998*, 2001*, 2002*, 2006, 2022
12	Lafayette Jeff	1935, 1942, 1947, 1948, 1951, 1964, 1967, 1968, 2001*, 2003*, 2019, 2020
10	New Castle	1943*, 1972, 1979, 1990*, 1995, 1997*, 2001*, 2003*, 2007*, 2010*
9	Richmond	1943, 1970*, 1971*, 1976*, 1977*, 1988, 2002*, 2014, 2015
5	Frankfort	1930, 1931, 1936, 1937, 1938*
4	Logansport	1933, 1934, 1977*, 2017
2	Arsenal Tech	1932, 1957
2	McCutcheon	2016, 2018
0	Harrison (WL)	
0	Huntington North	
0	Lebanon	
0	Rochester	

=== Girls basketball ===
#	Team	Seasons
14	Kokomo	1991, 1992, 1993, 1994*, 1998, 1999, 2000*, 2001, 2002, 2003, 2004, 2006, 2008*, 2010
9	Anderson	1982, 1983, 1984, 1986, 1987, 1994*, 2005, 2008*, 2021
7	Lafayette Jeff	1988, 1989, 1995*, 1996, 2017, 2018, 2019
5	Logansport	1997, 2008*, 2012, 2013, 2014
5	New Castle	1979, 1995*, 2007, 2009, 2011
4	Harrison (WL)	2020, 2021, 2022, 2023
4	Marion	1980, 1981, 2016, 2019
4	Richmond	1985, 1990, 2000*, 2015
0	Arsenal Tech	
0	Huntington North	
0	McCutcheon	
0	Muncie Central	

=== Boys cross country ===
#	Team	Seasons
19	Anderson	1946, 1947, 1948, 1949, 1950, 1951, 1953, 1954, 1958, 1959, 1962, 1963, 1980, 1981, 1982, 1983, 1986, 1987, 1988
16	Richmond	1960, 1961, 1970, 1971, 2973, 1974, 1975, 1976, 1977, 1978, 1979, 1992, 1994, 1995, 1998, 1999
7	Huntington North	2006, 2007, 2008, 2009, 2010, 2012, 2013
7	Muncie Central	1956, 1957, 1965, 1966, 1968, 1989, 2011
6	Marion	1991, 1993, 1996, 1997, 2002, 2004
6	Lafayette Jeff	1964, 1984, 1990, 2001, 2014, 2015, 2020
5	Kokomo	1952, 1955, 1985, 2000, 2005
3	Harrison (WL)	2018, 2019, 2022
3	Logansport	1967, 1969, 1972
2	McCutcheon	2016, 2017
0	Arsenal Tech	
0	Franfort	
0	Huntington North	
0	Lebanon	
0	New Castle	
0	Rochester	

== State championships ==
=== Anderson (26) ===
- 1935 Boys Basketball
- 1937 Boys Basketball
- 1945 Boys Track & Field
- 1946 Boys Basketball
- 1946 Boys Track & Field
- 1946 Boys Cross Country
- 1947 Boys Track & Field
- 1947 Boys Cross Country
- 1948 Boys Track & Field
- 1948 Boys Cross Country
- 1949 Boys Cross Country
- 1950 Boys Cross Country
- 1951 Boys Cross Country
- 1952 Boys Golf
- 1952 Boys Cross Country
- 1953 Boys Golf
- 1955 Boys Golf
- 1955 Boys Cross Country
- 1959 Boys Cross Country
- 1972 Boys Golf
- 1974 Boys Golf
- 1984 Girls Swimming & Diving
- 1985 Girls Swimming & Diving
- 1988 Boys Swimming & Diving
- 1989 Boys Swimming & Diving
- 1995 Boys Golf

=== Arsenal Tech (10) ===
- 1918 Baseball
- 1922 Boys Track
- 1933 Boys Golf
- 1936 Boys Golf
- 1947 Boys Golf
- 1948 Boys Golf
- 1952 Wrestling
- 1976 Wrestling
- 1979 Wrestling
- 2014 Boys Basketball (4A)

=== Harrison (4) ===
- 1974 Girls Track
- 1992 Football (4A)
- 1995 Baseball
- 2017 Boys Soccer (3A)
- 2024 Boys Soccer (3A)

=== Huntington North (2) ===
- 1990 Girls Basketball
- 1995 Girls Basketball

=== Kokomo (19) ===
- 1911 Boys Track
- 1924 Boys Track
- 1925 Boys Track
- 1926 Boys Track
- 1927 Boys Track
- 1934 Boys Track
- 1935 Boys Track
- 1937 Boys Track
- 1958 Boys Golf
- 1961 Boys Basketball
- 1969 Boys Swimming
- 1985 Baseball
- 1985 Boys Golf
- 1986 Boys Golf
- 1988 Boys Golf
- 1992 Girls Basketball
- 1993 Girls Basketball
- 1994 Boys Track
- 2003 Girls Basketball (4A)

=== Lafayette Jefferson Bronchos (14) ===
- 1916 boys' Basketball
- 1932 boys' Golf
- 1948 boys' Basketball
- 1964 boys' Basketball
- 1969 Baseball
- 1973 Baseball
- 1974 girls' Swimming
- 1975 boys' Tennis
- 1977 boys' Golf
- 1978 boys' Golf
- 1979 girls' Golf
- 1983 girls' Golf
- 1984 girls' Golf
- 1987 boys' Golf

=== Logansport (5) ===
- 1934 Boys Basketball
- 1975 Baseball
- 1977 Baseball
- 1979 Baseball
- 1991 Baseball

=== Marion (11) ===
- 1926 Boys Basketball
- 1966 Boys Golf
- 1975 Boys Basketball
- 1976 Boys Basketball
- 1984 Baseball
- 1985 Boys Basketball
- 1986 Boys Basketball
- 1987 Boys Basketball
- 1991 Boys Tennis
- 2000 Boys Basketball (4A)
- 2016 Boys Basketball (3A)

=== McCutcheon (4) ===
- 1999 Baseball (4A)
- 2003 Baseball (4A)
- 2008 Softball (4A)
- 2021 Girls' Volleyball (4A)

=== Muncie Central (17) ===
- 1928 Boys Basketball
- 1931 Boys Basketball
- 1951 Boys Basketball
- 1952 Boys Basketball
- 1963 Boys Basketball
- 1978 Boys Basketball
- 1979 Boys Basketball
- 1988 Boys Basketball
- 1956 Boys Cross Country
- 1958 Boys Cross Country
- 1967 Boys Cross Country
- 1997 Volleyball (4A)
- 1998 Volleyball (4A)
- 1999 Volleyball (4A)
- 2002 Volleyball (4A)
- 2004 Volleyball (4A)
- 2009 Volleyball (4A)

=== Richmond (8) ===
- 1941 Boys Golf
- 1958 Wrestling
- 1992 Boys Basketball
- 1993 Boys Golf
- 1994 Boys Cross Country
- 1996 Boys Golf
- 1997 Boys Golf
- 2003 Boys Golf

== Largest gymnasiums in nation in NCC ==
- 1. Anderson High School Wigwam (8,996) NOT IN USE.
- 6. Marion High School (7,560)

== Neighboring conferences ==
- Mid-Indiana Conference (MIC)
- Central Indiana Athletic Conference
- Three Rivers Conference

== See also ==
- Hoosier Hysteria
- Largest high school gyms in the United States

== Resources ==
- IHSAA Conferences
- IHSAA Directory
