= Little Seven Conference =

Little Seven Conference may refer to:

- Little Seven Conference (Michigan)
- Little Seven Conference (Wisconsin)
- Little 7 Conference, Illinois

== See also ==
- Little Three
- Little Four Conference (IHSAA)
- Little Five Conference
- Little Eight Conference (IHSAA)
- Little Eight Conference (Wisconsin)
- Little Nine Conference
- Little Ten Conference
- Little Ten Conference (Wisconsin)
- Little East Conference
