= Lebanon Community School Corporation =

School district in Indiana

The Lebanon Community School Corporation governs education in the areas surrounding the city of Lebanon, Indiana, the county seat in Boone County, Indiana.

The district includes Lebanon, Ulen, most of Whitestown, and portions of Zionsville.

The corporation is run by a five-member school board who appoints a superintendent to administer the corporation's day-to-day affairs.

The school board has final say in all hiring and other activities throughout the six school district.

== District Snapshot ==
- Students: 3,549
  - Ethnicity: 96% White, 2% Multiracial, 2% Hispanic
- Teachers:
  - Avg. Teacher Salary: $47,800
  - Avg. Teacher Age: 43 years

== Schools ==
- Elementary Schools: Harney Elementary, Hattie B. Stokes Elementary, Central Elementary, and Perry Worth Elementary
- Middle School: Lebanon Middle School
- High school: Lebanon Sr. High School

=== Lebanon Senior High School ===
- Students: 1,024
- Principal: Mr. Kevin O'Rourke
  - Asst. Principals: Mrs. Dickerson, Mr. Gee, Mr. Reynolds
- Teachers: 61
  - Average Salary:
  - Average Age: 42 years
- Ethnicity: 98% White, 1.5% Hispanic, .5% Multiracial

=== Lebanon Middle School ===
- Students: 826
- Principal: Mr. Doyle Dunshee
  - Assistant Principal: Mr. Mark Butler
  - Dean of Students: Mr. Jim McCune
  - 2nd Assistant Principal: Mrs. Lauren Huff
- Teachers: 45
  - Average Salary: $49,093
  - Average Age: 29–59 years
- Student Ethnicity: 96% White, 2% African American, 1% Hispanic, 1% Native American,

=== Elementary schools ===
- Hattie B. Stokes: 540 students
- Harney: 453 students
- Central: 378 students
- Perry Worth: 328 students

== Administration and School Board ==
- School Board Members: Michael Burtron (President), Michele Thomas (Vice President), Elizabeth Keith (Secretary), Tom Merritt, and David Herr
- Administration
  - Superintendent: Dr. Robert Taylor
  - Business Manager: Mr. Charles Tait
  - Executive Director of Resources and Operations: Mr. Bob Ross
  - Director of Curriculum: Mrs. Diane Scott

== Notable alumni ==
Craig Terrill, defensive tackle for the Seattle Seahawks and Rick Mount, named Indiana's Mr. Basketball in 1966 are two notable graduates. Also, parts of the Academy Award-nominated movie Hoosiers were filmed in the old Lebanon Senior High School building now called Memory Hall. John Cougar Mellencamp, an Indiana native, recently filmed a commercial in Memory Hall, now owned by a fitness gym but restored to its original condition with the addition of a mural.
