= Big Four Conference (disambiguation) =

Big Four Conference may refer to one of several conferences between heads of state or foreign ministers of the victorious nations after World War I (1914–18) or during and after World War II (1939–45).

Big Four Conference may also refer to:

- Big Four Conference (Indiana), high school athletic conference that existed in the U.S. state of Indiana from 1954 to 1971
- Big Four Conference (Oklahoma), intercollegiate athletic conference that existed in the U.S. state of Oklahoma from 1929 to 1932
- Big Four Conference (Wisconsin), intercollegiate athletic conference that existed in the U.S. state of Wisconsin from 1923 to 1932
