= Ted Hazelwood =

American football player (1924–2005)

No. 44, 78
- Position: Tackle

Personal information
- Born: April 25, 1924; Silverwood, Indiana, U.S.
- Died: February 27, 2005 (aged 80); Bellingham, Washington, U.S.
- Listed height: 6 ft 1 in (1.85 m)
- Listed weight: 235 lb (107 kg)

Career information
- High school: Frankfort (Frankfort, Indiana)
- College: Purdue; North Carolina (1945-1948)
- NFL draft: 1946: 16th round, 144th overall pick

Career history
- Chicago Hornets (1949); Washington Redskins (1953)

Awards and highlights
- 2× Second-team All-SoCon (1945, 1946)

Career NFL/AAFC statistics
- Games played: 15
- Games started: 8
- Stats at Pro Football Reference

Theodore Eugene Hazelwood (April 25, 1924 – February 27, 2005) was an American football offensive tackle in the National Football League (NFL) for the Washington Redskins. Hazelwood also played in the All-America Football Conference (AAFC) for the Chicago Hornets for the 1949 AAFC season.

He later appeared in six games for the Washington Redskins in 1953.

He played college football at the University of North Carolina. He played high school football for Frankfort High School in Indiana.
