= Hoosier Crossroads Conference =

High school athletic conference in central Indiana

- Conference: IHSAA
- Founded: 2000
- Sports fielded: 22 offered; men's: 10; women's: 11, and 1 unified
- No. of teams: All schools are 6A in football. Soccer, all 3A. All other sports, 4A
- Region: 4 Counties: Boone, Hamilton, Hendricks, Marion
- Website: http://www.hoosiercrossroadsconference.org

Locations
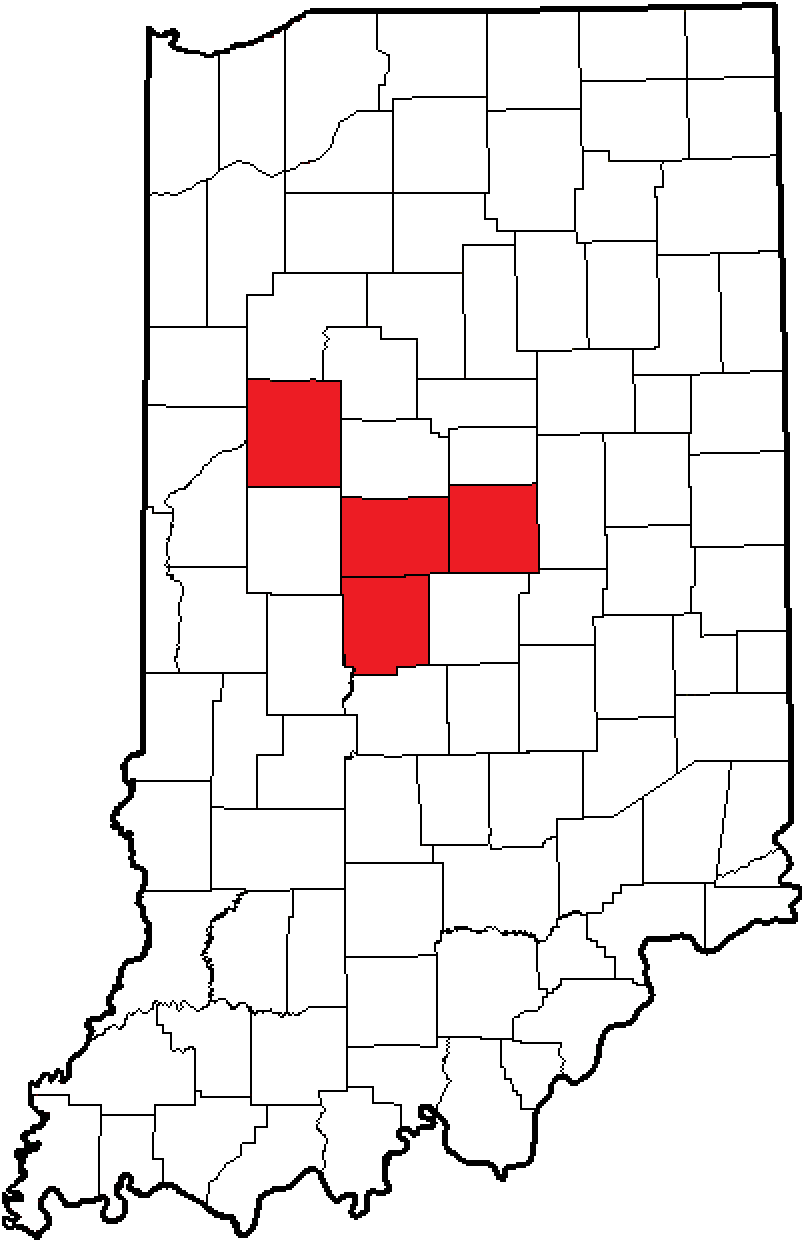

The Hoosier Crossroads Conference is a member conference of the Indiana High School Athletic Association. Teams first competed in the conference in the 2000–2001 school year. The HCC contains eight high schools in the Indianapolis Metropolitan Area. There are two schools in Hendricks County, one in Boone County, four in Hamilton County, and one in Marion County.

== History ==
The conference started in 2000, as the West division of the Olympic Conference (Brownsburg, Hamilton Southeastern, Harrison, McCutcheon, and Noblesville) joined with two schools from the folding Rangeline Conference (Westfield and Zionsville) and one from the Mid-State Conference (Avon). Lafayette Jeff joined in 2004 from the North Central Conference, and Fishers joined upon reopening in 2006.

In December 2012, Indianapolis-area schools voted to sever ties with Tippecanoe County schools following the 2013–14 school year due to transportation costs, travel time constraints, differences in school size, and competitive balance. The Lafayette area schools joined the North Central Conference.

In March 2017, the conference schools met to decide on letting an eighth member into the conference, Franklin Central. On March 15, 2017, the HCC admitted Franklin Central Flashes into the conference, effective for the 2018–2019 school year.

== Member schools ==
All schools are 6A in football, 3A in soccer, and 4A in all other class sports.

School	Location	Mascot	Colors	County	Enrollment 24–25	Year joined	Previous conference
Avon	Avon	Orioles		32; Hendricks	3,476	2000	Mid-State
Brownsburg	Brownsburg	Bulldogs		32; Hendricks	3,297	2000	Olympic
Fishers	Fishers	Tigers		29; Hamilton	3,664	2006	none (new school)
Franklin; Central	Indianapolis	Flashes		49; Marion	3,362	2018	Conference Indiana
Hamilton; Southeastern	Fishers	Royals		29; Hamilton	3,442	2000	Olympic
Noblesville	Noblesville	Millers		29; Hamilton	3,208	2000	Olympic
Westfield	Westfield	Shamrocks		29; Hamilton	2,789	2000	Rangeline
Zionsville	Zionsville	Eagles		06; Boone	2,309	2000	Rangeline

=== Membership timeline ===
Full members Other conference

== State champions ==
IHSAA State Champions

=== Avon Orioles (7) ===
- 2009 Boys' Golf
- 2012 Volleyball (4A)
- 2013 Girls' Soccer (2A)
- 2013 Volleyball (4A)
- 2016 Softball (4A)
- 2017 Volleyball (4A)
- 2018 Boys' Track

=== Brownsburg Bulldogs (10) ===
- 1984 Football (3A)
- 1985 Football (4A)
- 2005 Baseball (4A)
- 2008 Boys' Basketball (4A)
- 2017 Wrestling
- 2023 Boys' Track
- 2024 Wrestling
- 2024 Football (6A)
- 2025 Wrestling
- 2025 Football (6A)

=== Fishers Tigers (6) ===
- 2008 Boys' Cross Country
- 2010 Football (5A)
- 2014 Girls' Soccer
- 2018 Baseball (4A)
- 2024 Boys' Track & Field
- 2024 Boys' Basketball (4A)

=== Franklin Central Flashes (5) ===
- 1998 Boys’ Cross County
- 1981 Football (2A)
- 1982 Football (2A)
- 1983 Football (2A)
- 1990 Football (4A)

=== Hamilton Southeastern Royals (15) ===
- 1981 Football (A)
- 2003 Girls' Golf
- 2007 Boys' Swimming
- 2007 Softball (4A)
- 2008 Girls' Golf
- 2010 Girls' Golf
- 2010 Softball (4A)
- 2011 Girls' Golf
- 2013 Boys' Track
- 2018 Girls' Track
- 2019 Girls' Basketball (4A)
- 2019 Baseball (4A)
- 2022 Volleyball (4A)
- 2023 Volleyball (4A)
- 2024 Softball (4A)

=== Noblesville Millers (20) ===
- 1913 Boys' Track
- 1986 Girls' Golf
- 1987 Girls' Basketball
- 1987 Girls' Golf
- 1991 Girls' Soccer
- 1998 Boys' Golf
- 1999 Boys' Golf
- 2014 Baseball
- 2019 Girls' Soccer (3A)
- 2020 Girls' Soccer (3A)
- 2021 Boys' Soccer (3A)
- 2022 Girls' Basketball (4A)
- 2022 Girls' Cross Country
- 2022 Boys' Soccer (3A)
- 2022 Girls' Soccer (3A)
- 2023 Unified Track & Field
- 2023 Girls' Track
- 2023 Boys' Soccer (3A)
- 2023 Girls' Soccer (3A)
- 2024 Girls' Soccer (3A)

=== Westfield Shamrocks (10) ===
- 1998 Girls' Cross Country
- 2005 Girls' Cross Country
- 2006 Girls' Cross Country
- 2007 Girls' Cross Country
- 2013 Boys' Golf
- 2015 Boys' Golf
- 2016 Boys' Golf
- 2016 Football (5A)
- 2025 Boys' Golf
- 2026 Boys' Golf

=== Zionsville Eagles (11) ===
- 1987 Football (3A)
- 1996 Football (3A)
- 2002 Boys' Golf
- 2004 Boys' Golf
- 2009 Boys' Soccer
- 2017 Girls' Golf
- 2017 Girls' Cross Country
- 2019 Boys' Soccer
- 2019 Boys' Tennis
- 2020 Boys' Tennis
- 2021 Boys' Tennis

== See also ==
- Hoosier Hysteria
- Largest high school gyms in the United States
