= Little Four Conference (IHSAA) =

The Little Four Conference was a short-lived IHSAA-sanctioned conference in Central Indiana. The conference began in 1971, as the remaining three Big Four Conference schools joined with local team Eminence, who had been independent since the demise of the Little Eight Conference in 1964. The conference folded when Granville Wells consolidated into Western Boone. Within two years, Eminence would be the only school left from the four teams.

| School | Location | Mascot | Colors | County | Year joined | Previous conference | Year left | Conference joined |
|---|---|---|---|---|---|---|---|---|
| Eminence | Eminence | Eels | | 55; Morgan | 1971 | Independents (L8C 1964) | 1974 | Independents (TRC 1986) |
| Granville Wells^{1} | Jamestown | Rockets | | 06; Boone | 1971 | Big 4 | 1974 | none (consolidated into Western Boone |
| North Salem | North Salem | Blue Devils | | 32; Hendricks | 1971 | Big 4 | 1974 | Independents (closed 1976) |
| Pittsboro | Pittsboro | Burros | | 32; Hendricks | 1971 | Big 4 | 1974 | Independents (closed 1976) |
