= Northview High School (Brazil, Indiana) =

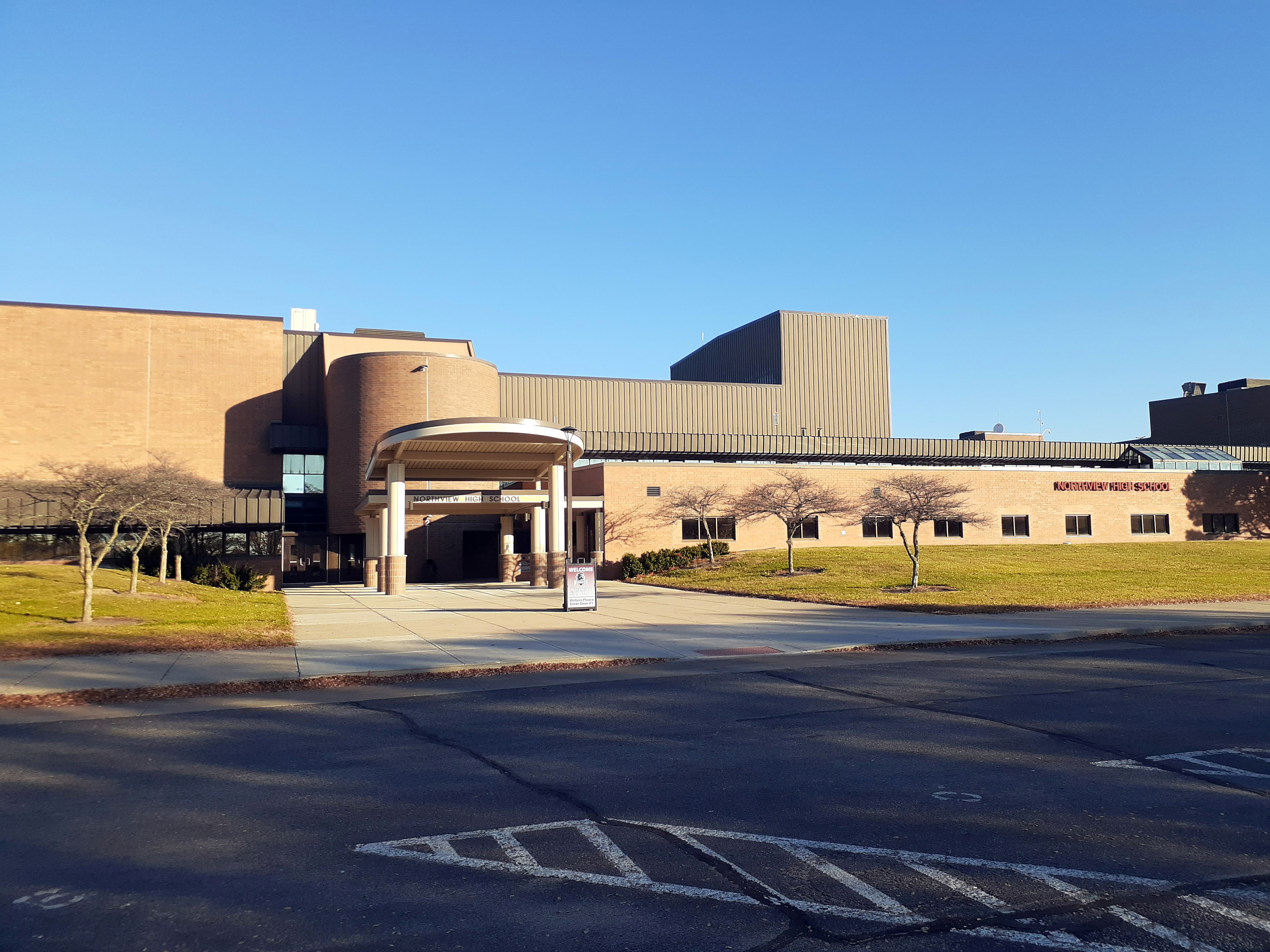

Location
- 3150 West SR 340; Brazil, Clay County, Indiana 47834; United States; 39.515935°N 87.166193°W

Information
- Type: Public high school
- School district: Clay Community Schools
- Principal: Chris Mauk
- Teaching staff: 70.24 (on an FTE basis)
- Grades: 9–12
- Enrollment: 894 (2023–2024)
- Student to teacher ratio: 12.73
- Color
- Team name: Knights
- Website: nhs.clay.k12.in.us

Northview High School is a high school located in Brazil, Indiana, United States.

== About ==
In 1984, the high schools located in Brazil, Staunton, and Van Buren were consolidated to create Northview High School. The student body of these schools selected the name "Northview"; the mascot "Knights"; and school colors silver, maroon, and black. Northview has 894 students. Its athletic teams play in the Western Indiana Conference.

The school's nickname is "The Castle in the Cornfield" due to it being located near many cornfields.

The school has an extensive list of athletic extracurriculars including cross country, golf, volleyball, baseball, football, basketball, and bowling. The school won the Indiana Baseball 3A state championship in 2016. They were also named the Indiana Volleyball 3A State Runners-Up in 2018. The cross country team has had a variety of sectional wins, as well as multiple runners qualifying for State Championships throughout the years.

Northview High School's marching band is known as the Marching Knights. The Northview Marching Knights have been crowned Indiana Class B State Champions nine times, State Runners-Up seven times, and have finished in the top five all but three years.

The Indoor Drumline was the 2007 IPA Class A State Champions in their first year of competition. They have also been named State Champions in 2012 & 2013. In addition to this, they have been named State Runner Up in 2008, 2018, & 2019. Beginning in the 2022 season, the Indoor Drumline began competing in WGI competitions in addition to IPA, making it to world finals in their first year.

The Winter Guard is a two-time World Class Indiana State Champion and has participated in world finals at the WGI World Class Championships 27 times.

== See also ==
- List of high schools in Indiana
- Western Indiana Conference
- Brazil, Indiana
