= South Putnam Junior-Senior High School =

High School Indiana, United States

South Putnam High School

Location
- 1780 East US Highway 40; Greencastle, Putnam County, Indiana 46135; United States
- 39.5830°N 86.8158°W

Information
- Type: Public high school
- Motto: "Successful Tradition, Innovative Future"
- School district: South Putnam Community Schools
- Principal: Tona Gardner
- Staff: 21.33 (FTE)
- Faculty: 34
- Grades: 9-12
- Enrollment: 363 (2023-24)
- Student to teacher ratio: 17.02
- Campus size: 2A (IHSAA)
- Color
- Athletics conference: Western Indiana Conference
- Team name: Eagles
- Rivals: North Putnam Cougars, Greencastle Tiger Cubs, Cloverdale Clovers, Cascade Cadets
- Yearbook: Aquila
- Website: Official website

South Putnam High School is a public high school located on the southern edge of Greencastle, Indiana in the heart of Putnam County. South Putnam High School serves students in the south central Putnam County area. There is also one middle school, South Putnam Middle School and two elementary schools, Fillmore and Central, that feed into South Putnam High School. South Putnam High School was ranked, in 2018, as the #18 high school in Indiana by U.S. News & World Report, the highest ranking of any Indiana public high school with less than 400 students. South Putnam High School is a school in South Putnam Community Schools, which is crossed by Interstate 70, U.S. Route 40, and U.S. Route 231. With the relative access to many highways, South Putnam is located in the crossroads between the cities of Terre Haute, Bloomington, Lafayette/West Lafayette, and Indianapolis, four university cities that have many prominent programs in various fields of study, which makes South Putnam a center of activity located between these four cities. Additionally, DePauw University is located four miles north in nearby Greencastle, IN.

== About ==
In 1969, the high schools located in Belle Union, Fillmore, and Reelsville consolidated to form South Putnam High School. The school nickname “Eagles” was chosen. The school colors combine red (Fillmore Cardinals), Blue (Belle Union Panthers), and White (Reelsville Warriors) into the color scheme of South Putnam.

The school participated in the West Central Conference until 2015 when the conference merged with the Western Indiana Conference. Students can participate in a variety of sports including boys’ and girls’ golf, tennis, swimming/diving, basketball, track/field, cross country, wrestling, football, girls’ volleyball, boys’ baseball, and girls’ softball

Academically, students at South Putnam High School have the option to take part in Advanced Placement courses, Advance College Project courses through Indiana University, College Challenge courses through Indiana State University, ALPHA Program at DePauw University and Ivy Tech Community College dual credit courses. This enables students at South Putnam to earn the Statewide Transfer General Education Core, a unique opportunity that South Putnam is one of few area schools to offer.

== State championships ==
1986 Class A Football State Champions

2011 Class AA Softball State Champions

2012 Class AA Softball State Champions

2002 Class A Football State Runner-Up

2025 Class A Football State Champions

== See also ==
- List of high schools in Indiana
