= Olympic Conference (Indiana) =

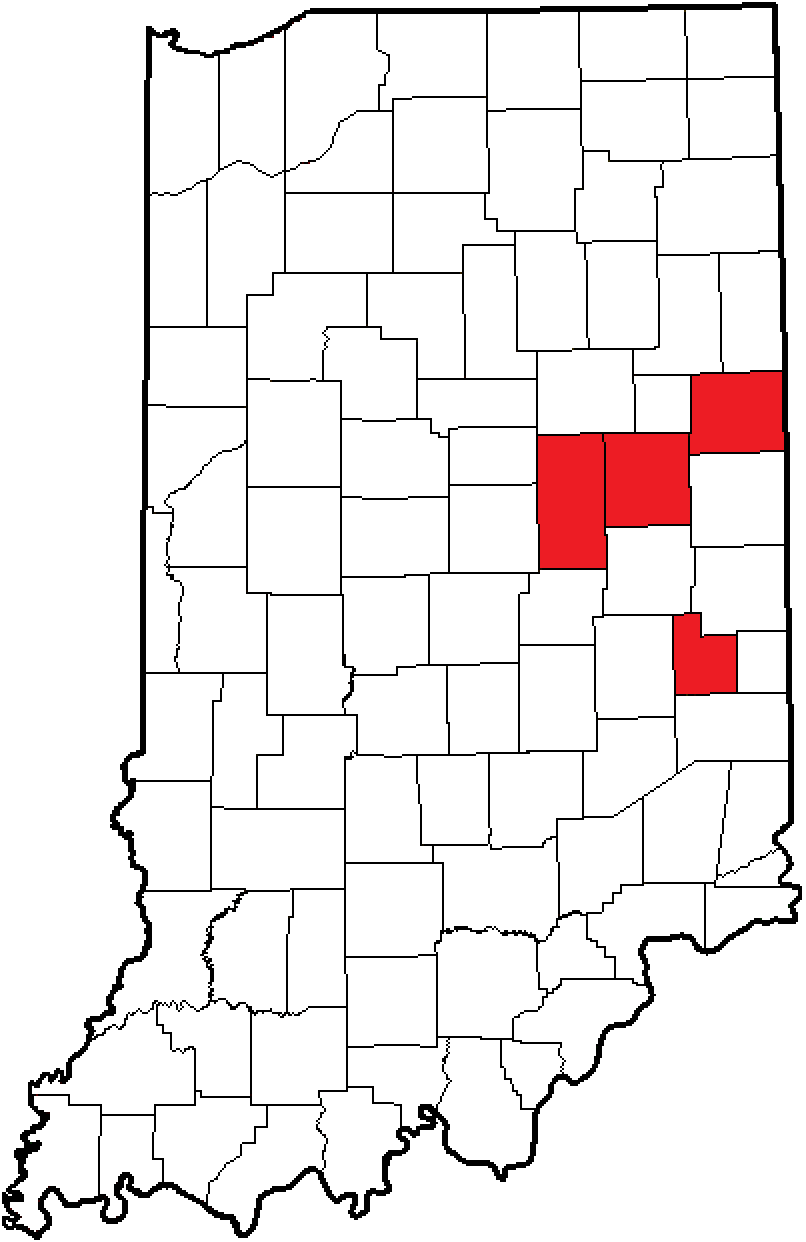
The Olympic Conference within Indiana

The Olympic Conference was an Indiana High School Athletic Association (IHSAA)-sanctioned conference located within Delaware, Fayette, Jay, and Madison counties. The conference was formed in 1971 by second (and third) high schools from Anderson, Kokomo, and Muncie, and also included suburban Indianapolis schools that grew too large for their conferences at the time. Many suburban schools ended up outgrowing the Olympic as well, with former members now in the Metropolitan and Hoosier Crossroads "superconferences," as the two contain many of the largest schools in the state.

While hosting ten schools in two divisions at its largest, the conference spent the 2000s with five members, then four after Huntington North joined the North Central Conference. With the closing of Anderson Highland after the 2009–2010 school year, as well as the possibility that Muncie Southside will close and be consolidated into Muncie Central in 2011, the conference decided to disband. Connersville joined the Eastern Indiana Conference in 2013, while Jay County joined the Allen County Athletic Conference in 2014. Southside remained open as an independent school until 2014

== Former members ==
School	Location	Mascot	Colors	County	Year joined	Previous conference	Year left	Conference joined
Haworth	Kokomo	Huskies		34; Howard	1971	Independents (opened 1968)	1984	none (school closed)
Madison Heights	Anderson	Pirates		48; Madison	1971	Independents (WRC 1959)	1997	none (school closed)
Muncie North Side	Muncie	Titans		18; Delaware	1971	none (new school)	1988	none (school closed)
Muncie Southside	Muncie	Rebels		18; Delaware	1971	Independents (opened 1962)	2010	Independents (closed 2014)
Carmel	Carmel	Greyhounds		29; Hamilton	1974	Sagamore	1996	Metro
Huntington; North	Huntington	Vikings		35; Huntington	1974	Central Indiana	2003	North Central
Anderson Highland	Anderson	Scots		48; Madison	1985	Classic	2010	none (school closed)
Jay County	Portland	Patriots		38; Jay	1985	Classic	2010	Independents (ACAC 2014)
Noblesville	Noblesville	Millers		29; Hamilton	1985	Central Suburban	2000	Hoosier Crossroads
Connersville	Connersville	Spartans		21; Fayette	1991	South Central	2010	Independents (EIAC 2013)
Brownsburg	Brownsburg	Bulldogs		32; Hendricks	1997	Independents (CSC 1991)	2000	Hoosier Crossroads
Hamilton; Southeastern	Fishers	Royals		29; Hamilton	1997	Hoosier Heritage	2000	Hoosier Crossroads
Harrison (West Lafayette)	West Lafayette	Raiders		79; Tippecanoe	1997	Hoosier	2000	Hoosier Crossroads
McCutcheon	Lafayette	Mavericks		79; Tippecanoe	1997	Hoosier	2000	Hoosier Crossroads

== Conference Divisions, 1997–2000 ==
Eastern	Western
Connersville	Brownsburg
Anderson Highland	Hamilton Southeastern
Huntington North	Harrison (WL)
Jay County	McCutcheon
Muncie Southside	Noblesville

== Resources ==
- IHSAA Conferences
- IHSAA Directory
