= Highland High School (Anderson, Indiana) =

Former school in Indiana, United States

Highland Middle School

Location
- 2108 E. 200 N. Anderson, Indiana; United States; 40°08′11″N 85°37′49″W

Information
- Type: Public Middle School
- Established: Fall 1955
- Status: Closed high school currently used as andersons main middle school
- Closed: 2009-2010
- School district: Anderson Community School Corporation
- Grades: 7-8
- Enrollment: 1512
- Colors: Plaid & White
- Mascot: Scots/Highlanders

Highland High School was a public high school located in Anderson, Indiana. It was part of the Anderson Community School Corporation. The school consolidated with Anderson High School after the 2009–10 academic year and the former Highland High School building is now used to house Highland Middle School.

== Demographics ==
For the 2006–07 school year, the student population was 1,312, 85% of students were White, 10% of students were African American, 3% of students were Hispanic, and 2% of students were biracial. When it comes to gender, 53% of the students were male while 47% were female.

== Athletics ==
Highland participated in a number of athletic events. Highland was a part of the Olympic Conference, along with Muncie Southside, Connersville, Madison Heights, Huntington North, Noblesville, Carmel, and Jay County.

=== Basketball ===
Boys

- 3 Sectional Titles (1976, 1980, 1991)
- 2 Regional Titles (1976, 1991)

Girls

- 9 Sectional Titles (1979, 1984–87, 1991–2, 1994, 1996)
- 5 Regional Titles (1979, 1985–87, 1991)
- 1 Semi-State Title (1986)
- State Runner-Up, 1986-87 (lost to Noblesville 47–38)

=== Baseball ===
- 10 Sectional Titles (1979, 1989, 1991–2, 1996–9, 2000, 2001, 2007), Regional Title (1999)
- Adam Lind was named Indiana's "Mr. Baseball" in 2002

=== Football ===
- 2 Sectional Title (2021/2022)

=== Softball ===
- 6 Sectional Titles (1990–92, 1999, 2003–4)
- 1 Regional Title (1990)

=== Track & Field ===
Boys

- 9 Sectional Titles (1994, 2000–2, 2006, 2007, 2008, 2009, 2010)
- Derrick Hill was the State Runner up in the 2009 High Jump State Finals.

Girls

- 8 Sectional Titles (1993–99, 2003)
- Teresa Henry (Williams) was the first highland girls track and field member to advance to the State Championship in 1977 in the 100 yard dash. She was MVP from 1974 to 1977, and was co-MVP with other club members.

=== Cross Country ===
Boys

- 4 Sectional Titles (1990–1, 1993–4)
- Kyle Baker was awarded the "Mental Attitude Award" in 1993

Girls

- 2 Sectional Titles (1993, 1995)
- Lisa Nicholson was awarded the "Mental Attitude Award," along with finish 15 at State in 2000

=== Tennis ===
Boys

- 12 Sectional Titles
- 6 Regional Titles

Girls

- State Runner-up (2001)
- Individuals State Champion, Ashlee Davis (2001, 2002)
  - Ashlee went undefeated, a combined 48–0, in her two championship seasons

=== Wrestling ===
- Highland had three individual wrestling state champions, with Camden Eppert most recently winning in 2007 @ 103 lb weight class and again in 2009 @ 119 lb weight class against the same opponent, Brandon Wright (Cathedral).

== Marching Highlanders ==
The Highland High School marching band was known as The Marching Highlanders. With a rich tradition of excellence, the Highlanders were known throughout the state for their unique uniforms and music. The Highlanders performed in full Scottish regalia, including kilts, plaids, and doublets. The Highlanders also had a bagpipe corps within their ranks, one of only a handful in United States high schools.

As early as 1958, the Marching Highlanders began competing in the annual Indiana State Fair Band Day competition held in Indianapolis. From 1958 through 1975, the Highlanders were a presence and force to be reckoned with, earning the title of State Champion on three occasions. The Highlanders returned to the State Fair in 2004, and repeatedly proved their skills by earning the championship title in 2005, 2007, and 2009. In 2010, after consolidation, the Marching Highlanders performed as the Anderson High School Marching Highlanders and received championship 2019, and their recent win, 2025.

=== ISSMA State Finals ===
- 2003 - ISSMA Regional Participant, Class A
- 2002 - ISSMA State Finals, Class B, 5th Place
- 2000 - ISSMA State Finals, Class B, 5th Place
- 1998 - ISSMA State Finals, Class A, 8th Place
- 1997 - ISSMA State Finals, Class B, 3rd Place
- 1996 - ISSMA State Finals, Class B, 6th Place
- 1995 - ISSMA State Finals, Class B, 3rd Place
- 1994 - ISSMA State Finals, Class B, 6th Place
- 1993 - ISSMA State Finals, Class B, 5th Place
- 1992 - ISSMA State Finals, Class A, 9th Place
- 1990 - ISSMA State Finals, Class A, 9th Place
- 1989 - ISSMA State Finals, Class A, 8th Place
- 1988 - ISSMA State Finals, Class A, 5th Place
- 1987 - ISSMA State Finals, Class A, 4th Place
- 1986 - ISSMA State Finals, Class A, 6th Place
- 1984 - ISSMA State Finals, Class A, 8th Place
- 1978 - ISSMA State Finals, Class A, 5th Place
- 1976–1983 - All-state Marching Band Contest/ISSMA – District & Regional Participants

=== Indiana State Fair Band Day ===
- Indiana State Fair Band Day Champions in 1968, 1970, 1971, 2005, 2007, 2009, 2019, 2025 and most recently, 2026 with their marching band show “Cirque du Ecossais”
- 12 finishes in the Top 5 in just fourteen years (1962–1974)
- Former director, Doug Fletcher, is the only director to win a championship with four different schools, and with a total of twelve championships

=== Notable performances ===
- Washington DC National Memorial Day Parade (2009)
- Hollywood Christmas Parade (2006)
- Macy's Thanksgiving Day Parade (2002)
- Boscov's Philadelphia Thanksgiving Day Parade (1998)
- Indianapolis 500 Parade (1969, 1970, 1971, 1972, 1973, 1974, 1975, 1976, 1992, 1999, 2006, 2010)
- Walt Disney World Parades (1989, 1997, 2001, 2004)
- Orange Bowl Parade (1989, 1993)
- Pan-Am Games Opening Ceremonies (1987)
- Fiesta Bowl Parade, (1986)
- Chicago Christmas Parade, (1973, 1976, 1979)
- President Richard Nixon's Inaugural Parade - Washington D.C. in (1969)
- Philadelphia Thanksgiving Day Parade (2010)
- Glasgow, Scotland Concert in City Square England/Scotland Tour 1972
- Toronto, Canada Scottish World Festival Military Tattoo Canadian National Exhibition in 1976

== Notable alumni ==
- Linc Darner, basketball head coach, University of Wisconsin-Green Bay
- Jon McLaughlin, Island Records singer-songwriter
- Adam Lind, Major League Baseball player
