= Craig Terrill =

American football player (born 1980)

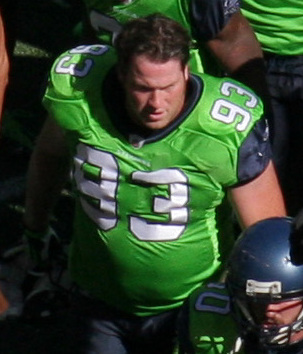
- Terrill with the Seattle Seahawks in 2009

No. 93
- Position: Defensive tackle

Personal information
- Born: June 27, 1980 (age 46); Lebanon, Indiana, U.S.
- Listed height: 6 ft 3 in (1.91 m)
- Listed weight: 296 lb (134 kg)

Career information
- High school: Lebanon
- College: Purdue
- NFL draft: 2004: 6th round, 189th overall pick

Career history
- Seattle Seahawks (2004–2010)

Awards and highlights
- Second-team All-Big Ten (2003)

Career NFL statistics
- Total tackles: 109
- Sacks: 8.0
- Fumble recoveries: 3
- Pass deflections: 5
- Defensive touchdowns: 1
- Stats at Pro Football Reference

Craig Adam Terrill (born June 27, 1980) is an American former professional football player who was a defensive tackle for the Seattle Seahawks of the National Football League (NFL). In 88 career games, Terrill had 103 combined tackles, with eight sacks, three fumble recoveries, and one touchdown. He played college football for the Purdue Boilermakers. He was selected by the Seahawks in the sixth round of the 2004 NFL draft. He blocked eight field goals in his career, tied for the Seahawks team record.

== Early life ==
Terrill was born on June 27, 1980, in Lebanon, Indiana. Growing up, Terrill had two brothers, Jason and Troy; Jason taught him how to play guitar and played college football for the Ball State Cardinals, whereas Troy played college basketball at Indiana University – Purdue University Indianapolis. Craig played high school football with the Lebanon Tigers, where he set a record for most sacks in a season, with 27, and graduated as the team's all-time sack leader. Terrill was named First-team All-State during his senior year.

== Professional career ==
The Seattle Seahawks selected Terrill with selection number 189 in the sixth round of the 2004 NFL draft. In 2010, Profootballtalk.com writer Gregg Rosenthal described Terrill as a "key member of the [Seattle's] defensive tackle rotation." Seattle released Terrill in September 2010 before signing him again to play 12 games in the 2010 season. While playing in the NFL, Terrill stood at 6 feet 3 inches (191 cm) and weighed 296 pounds (134 kg). (Note: Pro-Football-Reference.com lists Terrill's weight at 295 pounds (134 kg).)

== Personal life ==
In 2004, Terrill wrote articles for The Spokesman-Review. He is an uncle to Luke Terrill, who played college football as a defensive tackle for the Western Illinois Leathernecks. Terrill is also a talented musician. In college, Craig and his brother Jason formed a band called The Strangers. Later, Terrill was the lead singer of The Craig Terrill Band in Seattle. He released two original albums, CT and Genuine. He played with the late Seahawks owner, Paul Allen's, band to open for Seal at a concert in Seattle. Terrill is married to Rachel Terrill, who has a Ph.D. in communication from the University of South Florida. In 2015, Terrill worked as an assistant coach for the Lebanon High School football team.
