= Frankfort High School (Indiana) =

Frankfort Senior High School

Location
- 1 South Maish Road; Frankfort, Indiana 46041; United States; 40°16′53″N 86°29′07″W

Information
- Type: Public secondary school
- School district: Community Schools of Frankfort
- Superintendent: Matt Rhoda
- Principal: Jennifer Flynn
- Teaching staff: 61.00 (on an FTE basis)
- Grades: 9-12
- Enrollment: 901 (2023–2024)
- Student to teacher ratio: 14.77
- Colors: Blue and white
- Athletics conference: Sagamore Conference
- Nickname: Hot Dogs
- Newspaper: Frankfort Times
- Website: fhs.frankfortschools.org

Frankfort Senior High School is a public secondary school in Frankfort, Indiana, United States. It serves grades 9-12 for the Community Schools of Frankfort.

== Demographics ==
The demographic breakdown of the 893 students enrolled for the 2021–22 school year was:

- Male - 52.3%
- Female - 47.7%
- American Indian/Alaska Native - <1.0%
- Asian - <1.0%
- Black - <1.0%
- Hispanic - 57.2%
- Native Hawaiian/Pacific Islander - <1.0%
- White - 40.4%
- Multiracial - 1.6%

67.6% of the students were eligible for free or reduced-cost lunch. Frankfort is a Title I school.

== Athletics ==
Frankfort's Hot Dogs compete in the Sagamore Conference. School colors are blue and white. The following Indiana High School Athletic Association (IHSAA) sanctioned sports are offered:

- Baseball (boys)
- Basketball (girls and boys)
  - Boys state champion - 1925, 1929, 1936, 1939
- Cross country (girls and boys)
- Football (boys)
- Golf (girls and boys)
- Soccer (girls and boys)
- Softball (girls)
- Swimming and diving (girls and boys)
- Tennis (girls and boys)
- Track and field (girls and boys)
- Volleyball (girls)
- Wrestling (boys)

=== Blue Chips (1994 film) ===
The basketball games in the 1994 movie Blue Chips were filmed in the school's basketball arena, Case Arena. In 2024, Frankfort (representing the Western Dolphins, the main team in the movie) played Rossville High School (representing the Indiana Hoosiers, the team that lost to Western) in a game commemorating the 30th anniversary of the film's release.

== Notable alumni ==
- Kyle Cook: Lead guitarist of the American rock band Matchbox Twenty
- Rana Foroohar: Author, business columnist and an associate editor at the Financial Times
- Dan Flanagan: Justice of the Indiana Supreme Court
- Mark Genda: Indiana House of Representative
- Ted Hazelwood: played offensive tackle for the Purdue Boilermakers and the North Carolina Tar Heels. He was drafted in the 16th round of the 1946 NFL draft by the Chicago Bears and also played for the Washington Redskins

== See also ==
- List of high schools in Indiana
- Education in the United States
