= Western Boone Junior-Senior High School =

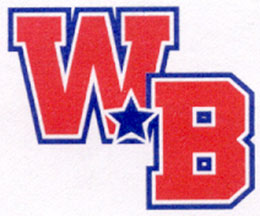

Location
- 1205 North SR 75; Thorntown, Boone County, Indiana 46071; United States; 40.056309°N 86.613100°W

Information
- Type: Public high school
- Locale: Rural
- School district: Western Boone County Community School District
- Superintendent: Rob Ramey
- Principal: Brent Miller
- Faculty: 49.00 (on an FTE basis)
- Grades: 7-12
- Enrollment: 774 (2023–24)
- Student to teacher ratio: 15.80
- Campus size: 2A (IHSAA)
- Colors: Red, white, and blue
- Team name: Stars
- Website: webo.weboschools.org

The Western Boone Junior-Senior High School, colloquially called WeBo, is a public high school located in Thorntown, Indiana.

== History ==
The school was founded after the consolidation of five Boone County public schools: Dover, Pinnell, Thorntown, Washington, and Granville Wells. To represent the five schools, Orion the star was chosen to represent to newly founded school as its mascot.

== Athletics ==
The Western Boone Stars are currently members of the Monon Athletic Conference. Student athletes at WeBo participate in the following Indiana High School Athletic Association (IHSAA) sanctioned sports are offered:

- Baseball (Boys)
- Basketball (Boys & Girls)
- Cross Country (Boys & Girls)
- Football (Boys)
- Golf (Boys & Girls)
- Soccer (Boys & Girls)
- Softball (Girls)
- Swimming (Boys & Girls)
- Tennis (Boys & Girls)
- Track & Field (Boys & Girls)
- Volleyball (Boys & Girls)
- Wrestling (Boys & Girls)

=== State Championships ===
==== Diving ====
- 1992 IHSAA One Meter Diving: Brian Carr
- 1993 IHSAA One Meter Diving: Brian Carr

==== Football ====
- 1988 IHSAA 2A Champions
- 2018 IHSAA 2A Champions
- 2019 IHSAA 2A Champions
- 2020 IHSAA 2A Champions

==== Track & Field ====
- 2019 IHSAA Boys High Jump: Logan Benson

== Performing Arts ==
=== Imperial Star Command Band ===
Western Boone's marching band was founded in the summer of 1974 under the direction of Richard J. Gress, the former music teacher and band director of Thorntown High School. Continuing the tradition set by the Thorntown High School marching band, The Imperial Star Command Band participated in the summer marching events hosted by the Central Indiana Track Show Association (CITSA) from 1974 to 1979.

Under new direction, the band began participating in the Indiana State School Music Association's (ISSMA) Fall marching in 1977. The Imperial Star Command Band would have their highest placement of 8th at the State Finals in 1983. They continued to participate in ISSMA events until 1988, when the program took a five-year absence until their return in 1994.

In 2010, the program returned to the Summer marching events hosted by CITSA and has continued to participate, most recently in the 2023 Indiana State Fair Band Day event. In the 2023 season the Imperial Star Command Band placed 11th place in the preliminary scoring. That placement allowed the band to participate in the Indiana State Fair Band Day Finals for the first time since 1979. The band competed in the finals in the following years (with finals score placements):

- 1974 (16th place)
- 1975 (16th place)
- 1976 (16th place)
- 1979 (14th place)
- 2023 (11th place)

== See also ==
- List of high schools in Indiana
- Sagamore Conference
