= Lebanon Senior High School =

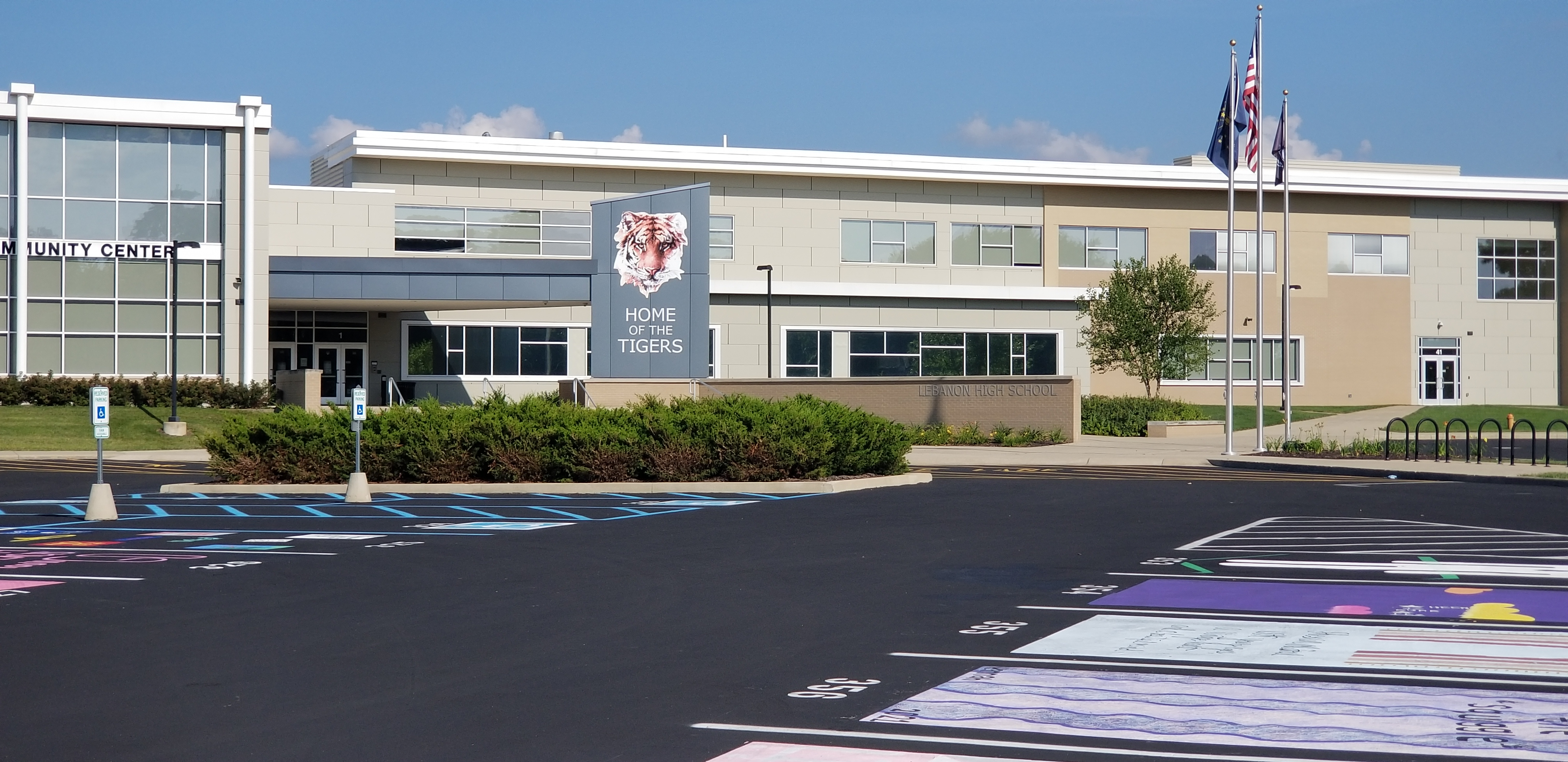
- Front entrance to Lebanon High School

Location
- 510 Tiger Way; Lebanon, Indiana 46052; United States
- 40°3′28″N 86°27′46″W

Information
- Founded: 1876
- School district: Lebanon Community School Corporation
- Principal: Frank Meyer
- Teaching staff: 66.33 (FTE)
- Enrollment: 1,038 (2023–2024)
- Student to teacher ratio: 15.65
- Colors: Vegas gold and black
- Athletics conference: Sagamore Athletic Conference
- Nickname: Tigers
- Newspaper: Lhs Pennant
- Yearbook: 2021–2022
- Website: lhs.leb.k12.in.us

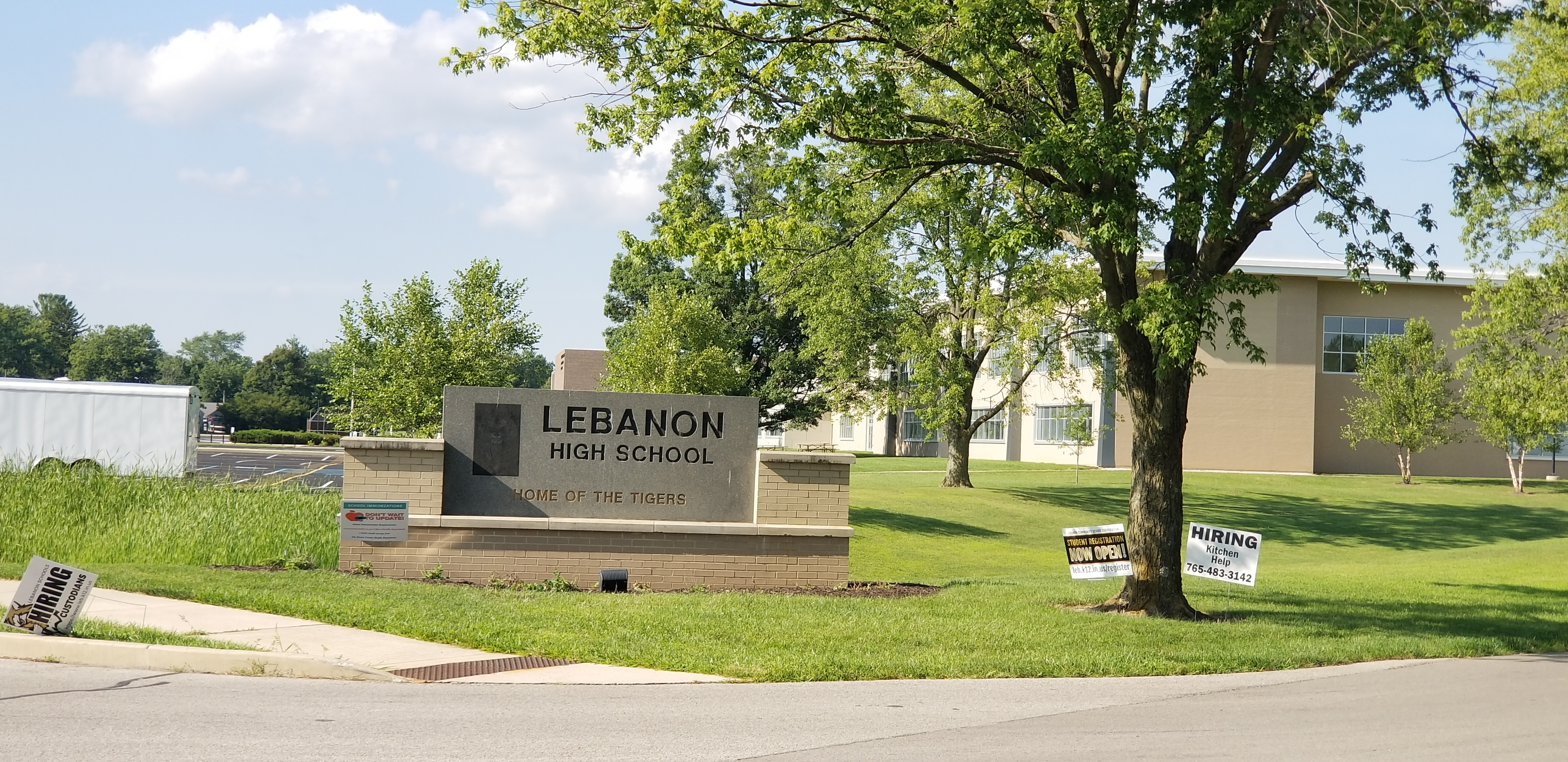
Lebanon High School

Lebanon Senior High School is the only secondary school in the Lebanon Community School Corporation. It is a medium-sized school and a suburban school district located in Lebanon, Boone County, Indiana, about twenty-five minutes from downtown Indianapolis.

== History ==
Lebanon has had a high school since 1876. The current building was constructed in 1958, with upgrades in 1967, 1972 and 1990. Two of the more famous faculty/staff alumni are Ward Lambert and Glenn M. Curtis.

== Demographics ==
The demographic breakdown of the 1,001 students enrolled for the 2021–2022 school year was:

- Male - 53.6%
- Female - 46.4.0%
- Native American/Alaskan - <1.0%
- Asian - <1.0%
- Black - 2.6%
- Hispanic - 8.7%
- Native Hawaiian/Pacific Islander - <1.0%
- White - 83.8%
- Multiracial - 3.6%

In addition, 59.9% of the students were eligible for free or reduced-cost lunch. For 2017–18, Lebanon was a Title I school.

== Athletics ==
The Lebanon Tigers compete in the Sagamore Athletic Conference. The school colors are black and Vegas gold. The following IHSAA-sanctioned sports are offered:

- Baseball (boys)
- Basketball (girls & boys)
  - Boys state champions - 1912, 1917, 1918
- Cross country (girls & boys)
- Football (boys)
- Golf (girls & boys)
- Soccer (girls & boys)
- Softball (girls)
  - State champions - 2016
- Swimming (girls & boys)
- Tennis (girls & boys)
- Track & field (girls & boys)
- Volleyball (girls)
- Wrestling (boys & girls)
  - Girls State Champions - 2021

== Notable alumni ==
- Doug Jones - Major League Baseball (MLB) relief pitcher
- Rick Mount - American Basketball Association guard
- Drew Powell - actor
- Ed Schilling - basketball coach
- Craig Terrill - National Football League (NFL) defensive lineman

== See also ==
- List of high schools in Indiana
