= Greencastle High School =

Location
- 910 East Washington Street; Greencastle, Putnam County, Indiana 46135; United States; 39.643136°N 86.843433°W

Information
- Type: Public high school
- School district: Greencastle Community School Corporation
- Principal: Yolanda Goodpaster
- Teaching staff: 36.00 (FTE)
- Grades: 9-12
- Enrollment: 495 (2023–2024)
- Student to teacher ratio: 13.75
- Color
- Athletics conference: Monon Athletic Conference
- Team name: Tiger Cubs
- Website: http://ghs.greencastle.k12.in.us/

Greencastle High School is a public high school located in Greencastle, Indiana. It is a part of the Greencastle Community School Corporation.

The school district, in which this is the sole comprehensive high school, includes Greencastle, Greencastle Township, and Madison Township.

== History ==
Greencastle High School was first established circa 1823. A previous building opened in 1918. It stopped functioning as the high school in 1958, and by 2018 the structure was used as the Green Tree Condominiums. The current high school property opened in 1958. A new construction project was added in 2024. This added a connection hallway and many new expansions to the high school.

== Notable Students ==
Dylan Havey, Lukas Shrout, Beckett Selvey, Lucas Frye, Beau Baird (unfortunately), Charlie Montoglio (Icon),

== See also ==
- List of high schools in Indiana
