= North Putnam Senior High School =

Location
- 8869 North County Road 250 East; Roachdale, Putnam County, Indiana 46172; United States
- 39.789294°N 86.801037°W

Information
- Type: Public high school
- School district: North Putnam Community Schools
- Principal: Amanda Williams
- Teaching staff: 30.75 (FTE)
- Grades: 9-12
- Enrollment: 432 (2023-2024)
- Student to teacher ratio: 14.05
- Color
- Athletics conference: Western Indiana Conference
- Mascot: Cougars
- Rivals: Greencastle High School, South Putnam Highschool, Cloverdale Highschool
- Website: Official Website

North Putnam Senior High School is a public high school located in Roachdale, Indiana. Established on July 1, 1964, it serves approximately 400 students in grades 9-12. The North Putnam Senior High School is part of the North Putnam School Corporation, which has elementary schools in Bainbridge and Roachdale, Indiana.
