= Cloverdale High School =

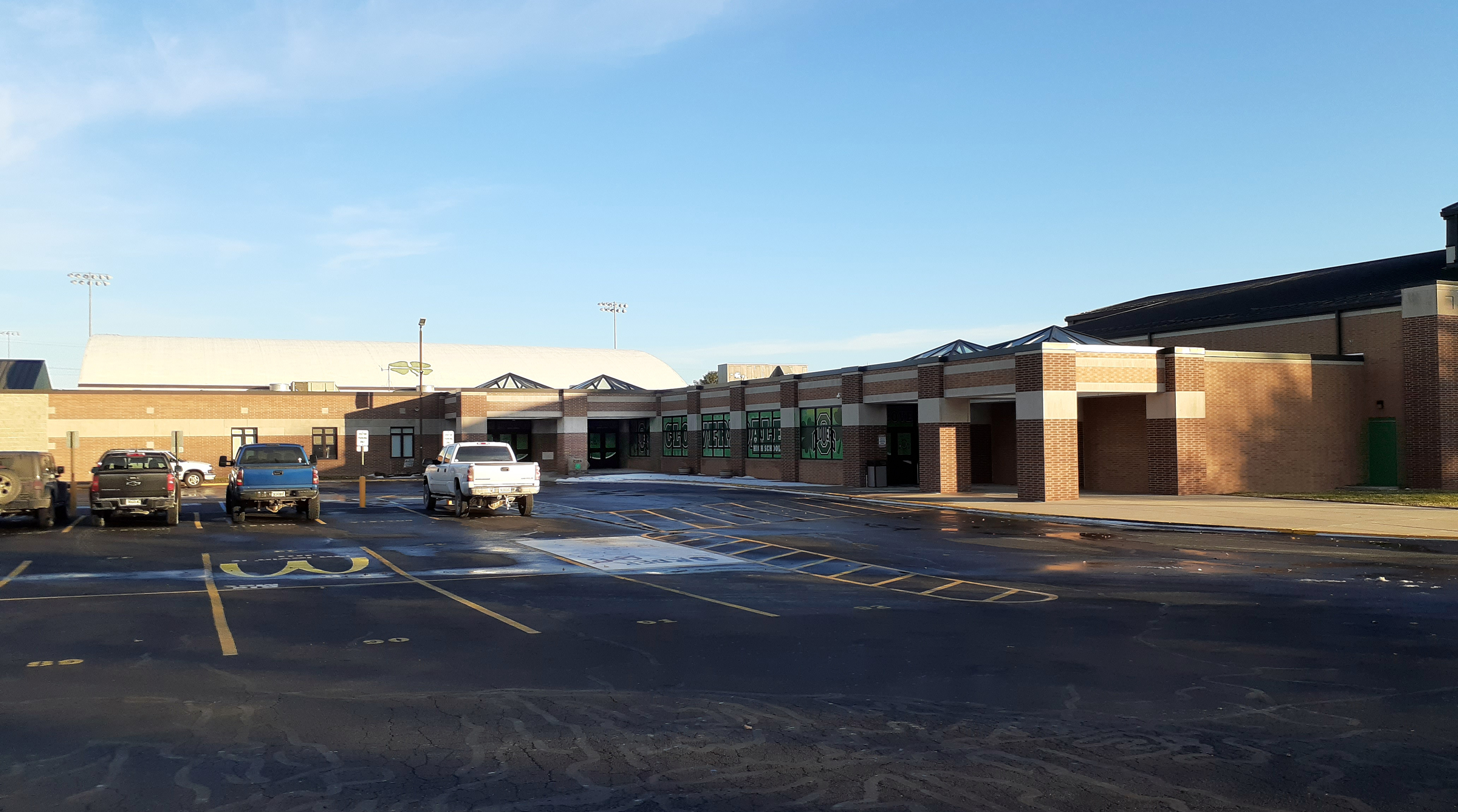

Location
- 205 East Market Street; Cloverdale, Putnam County, Indiana 46120; United States
- Coordinates: 39.511691°N 86.791537°W

Information
- Type: Public high school
- School district: Cloverdale Community Schools
- Principal: H. Sonny Stoltz
- Teaching staff: 21.50 (FTE)
- Grades: 9-12
- Enrollment: 283 (2023-2024)
- Student to teacher ratio: 13.16
- Color
- Athletics conference: Western Indiana Conference
- Team name: Clovers
- Website: Official Website

Cloverdale High School is a public high school located in Cloverdale, Indiana.

== See also ==
- List of high schools in Indiana
