= Roachdale, Indiana =

- Town
- Location of Roachdale in Putnam County, Indiana.
- Coordinates: 39°50′57″N 86°48′02″W
- Country: United States
- State: Indiana
- County: Putnam
- Township: Franklin, Jackson

Area
  - Total: 0.51 sq mi (1.31 km^{2})
  - Land: 0.51 sq mi (1.31 km^{2})
  - Water: 0 sq mi (0.00 km^{2})
- Elevation: 850 ft (260 m)

Population (2020)
  - Total: 840
  - Density: 1,657.8/sq mi (640.07/km^{2})
- Time zone: UTC-5 (Eastern (EST))
  - Summer (DST): UTC-4 (EDT)
- ZIP code: 46172
- Area code: 765
- FIPS code: 18-64980
- GNIS feature ID: 2396883
- Website: www.townofroachdale.org

Roachdale is a town in Franklin and Jackson townships, Putnam County, in the U.S. state of Indiana. As of the 2020 census, Roachdale had a population of 840.

== History ==
Roachdale was platted in 1879, and named for Judge Roach, a railroad official. A post office has been in operation at Roachdale since 1880. Roachdale was incorporated in 1882 when the railroad was extended to that point.

== Geography ==
According to the 2010 census, Roachdale has a total area of 0.51 square miles (1.32 km^{2}), all land.

== Demographics ==
Historical population
Census	Pop.	Note	%±
1880	86		—
1890	428		397.7%
1900	942		120.1%
1910	849		−9.9%
1920	876		3.2%
1930	631		−28.0%
1940	736		16.6%
1950	918		24.7%
1960	927		1.0%
1970	1,004		8.3%
1980	958		−4.6%
1990	902		−5.8%
2000	975		8.1%
2010	926		−5.0%
2020	840		−9.3%
U.S. Decennial Census

=== 2010 census ===
As of the census of 2010, there were 926 people, 356 households, and 240 families living in the town. The population density was 1,815.7 inhabitants per square mile (701.0/km^{2}). There were 401 housing units at an average density of 786.3 per square mile (303.6/km^{2}). The racial makeup of the town was 99.2% White and 0.8% from two or more races. Hispanic or Latino of any race were 0.4% of the population.

There were 356 households, of which 40.7% had children under the age of 18 living with them, 46.6% were married couples living together, 14.6% had a female householder with no husband present, 6.2% had a male householder with no wife present, and 32.6% were non-families. 26.7% of all households were made up of individuals, and 14% had someone living alone who was 65 years of age or older. The average household size was 2.60 and the average family size was 3.16.

The median age in the town was 35.6 years. 29.3% of residents were under the age of 18; 8.3% were between the ages of 18 and 24; 23.3% were from 25 to 44; 25.9% were from 45 to 64; and 13.3% were 65 years of age or older. The gender makeup of the town was 49.7% male and 50.3% female.

=== 2000 census ===
As of the census of 2000, there were 975 people, 388 households, and 268 families living in the town. The population density was 1,910.2 inhabitants per square mile (737.5/km^{2}). There were 418 housing units at an average density of 819.0 per square mile (316.2/km^{2}). The racial makeup of the town was 99.28% White, 0.21% African American, 0.10% Native American, and 0.41% from two or more races.

There were 388 households, out of which 32.2% had children under the age of 18 living with them, 54.1% were married couples living together, 11.3% had a female householder with no husband present, and 30.9% were non-families. 27.8% of all households were made up of individuals, and 14.7% had someone living alone who was 65 years of age or older. The average household size was 2.51 and the average family size was 3.05.

In the town, the population was spread out, with 27.7% under the age of 18, 7.3% from 18 to 24, 27.6% from 25 to 44, 20.8% from 45 to 64, and 16.6% who were 65 years of age or older. The median age was 36 years. For every 100 females, there were 93.5 males. For every 100 females age 18 and over, there were 90.5 males.

The median income for a household in the town was $31,932, and the median income for a family was $39,792. Males had a median income of $31,688 versus $22,375 for females. The per capita income for the town was $17,112. About 9.6% of families and 12.6% of the population were below the poverty line, including 22.3% of those under age 18 and 10.7% of those age 65 or over.

== Education ==
The town has a lending library, the Roachdale-Franklin Township Public Library.

== Arts and culture ==
An annual tradition of roach races began in the town in 1981, as "a gimmick for the Fourth of July carnival". To insure large sizes the roaches are imported from South Carolina labs. Contestants put their insects in a plastic container that is placed on an oval track on a four by eight plywood board. The container is lifted at the start of the race and whichever roach reaches the perimeter of the board first is declared the winner of each heat. The popularity of the race resulted in its appearing on the television programs regionally on Across Indiana and nationally on Good Morning America. In addition to being covered by The Indianapolis Star newspaper, the race was written up in Ripley's Believe It or Not!. Many contestants dress their roaches by gluing paper top hats, saddles, or other apparel to their backs. At the end of racing the roaches are collected, sprayed with insecticide, and disposed of.
