= Indiana High School Athletics Conferences: Ohio River Valley – Western Indiana =

This is the third of three pages that lists all of the High School athletic conferences located in state of Indiana under the Indiana High School Athletic Association (IHSAA).

== Indiana's class system ==
Indiana's classes are determined by student enrollment, broken into classes of roughly equal size depending on sport. The 2011–12 school year marks a change in the classification period, as schools are reclassified in all class sports biennially instead of quadrennially.

It is also important to note that some schools (mostly private) are placed in classes higher than their enrollment. This is due to a new IHSAA rule that took effect for the 2012–13 year that dictates that a school that has made two appearances at the state championships in a row, win or lose, is automatically moved up into the next class.

Schools' sports teams for 2020–21 through 2022–23 are separated into classes as follows:

Most sports:

- Class A: <325 Students.
- Class AA: 325-565 Students.
- Class AAA: 566-1089 Students.
- Class AAAA: >1089 Students.

Football:

- Class A: <418 students
- Class AA: 418-591 students
- Class AAA: 592-849 students
- Class AAAA: 850-1499 students
- Class AAAAA: 1500-2099 Students
- Class AAAAAA: >2100 Students

Soccer:

- Class A: <499 students
- Class AA: 500-1000 students
- Class AAA: >1000 Students

== Conferences ==
=== Ohio River Valley Conference ===
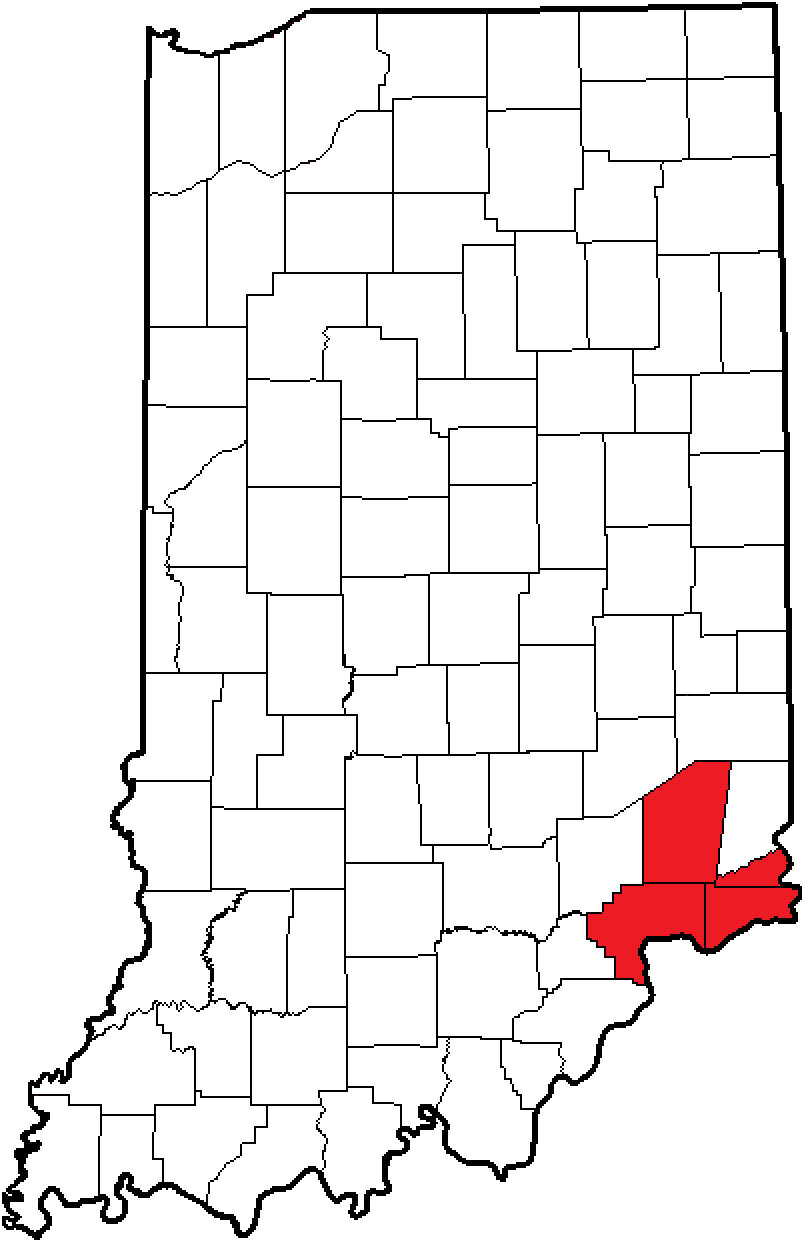
The Ohio Valley Conference in Indiana

School	Location	Mascot	Colors	Size	IHSAA Class	IHSAA Football Class	County
Jac-Cen-Del	Osgood, Indiana	Eagles		279	A	--	69; Ripley
Milan	Milan	Indians		408	AA	A	69; Ripley
Rising; Sun	Rising Sun	Shiners		243	A	--	58; Ohio
Madison; Shawe	Madison	Hilltoppers		112	A	--	39; Jefferson
South; Ripley	Versailles	Raiders		375	AA	--	69; Ripley
Southwestern; Hanover	Hanover	Rebels		411	AA	--	39; Jefferson
Switzerland; County	Vevay	Pacers		432	AA	--	78; Switzerland

=== Patoka Lake Conference ===
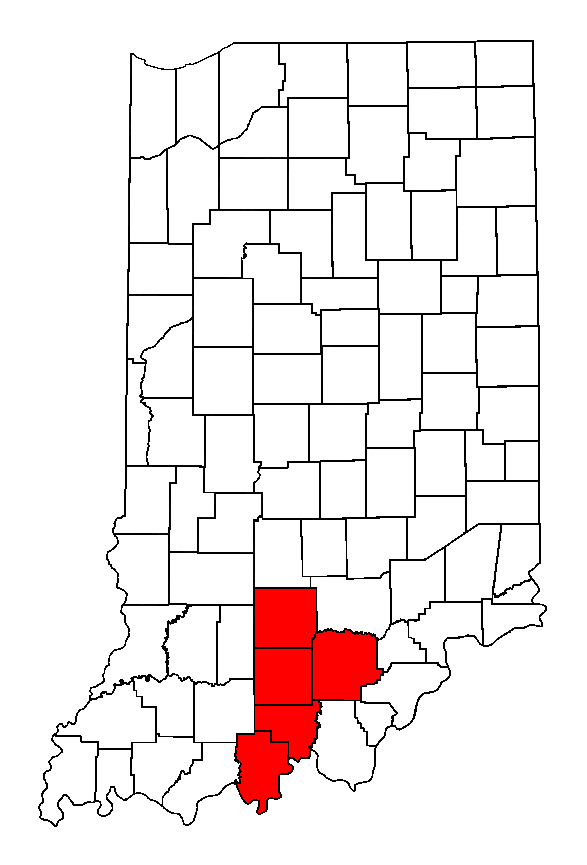
Location of PLC members in Indiana

School	Location	Mascot	Colors	Size	IHSAA Class	IHSAA Football Class	County
Crawford; County	Marengo	Wolfpack		487	AA	AA	13 Crawford; 31 Harrison
Mitchell	Mitchell	Bluejackets		620	AAA	AAA	47; Lawrence
Orleans	Orleans	Bulldogs		258	A	--	59; Orange
Paoli	Paoli	Rams		511	AA	AA	59; Orange
Perry; Central	Leopold	Commodores		334	AA	A	62; Perry
Springs; Valley	French Lick	Blackhawks		319	A	A	59; Orange
West; Washington	Campbellsburg	Senators		307	A	A	88; Washington

=== Pioneer Conference ===
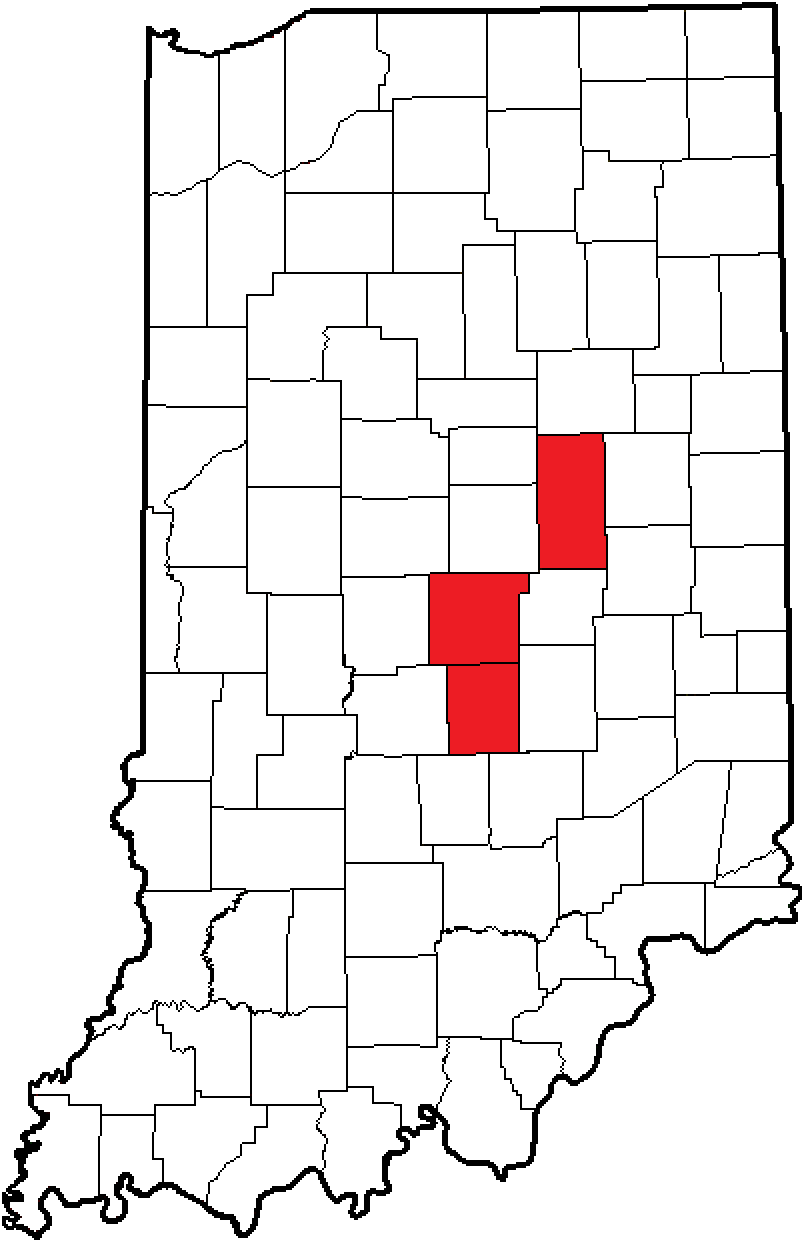
The Pioneer Conference in Indiana

School	Location	Mascot	Colors	Size	IHSAA Class	IHSAA Football Class	County
Indianapolis; Baptist Academy	Indianapolis	Chargers		54	A	--	49; Marion
Greenwood; Christian	Greenwood	Cougars		104	A	--	41; Johnson
Indianapolis; Crispus Attucks	Indianapolis	Tigers		356	AA	--	49; Marion
Indianapolis; Shortridge	Indianapolis	Blue Devils		374	AA	--	49; Marion
International; School of Indiana	Indianapolis	Gryphons		136	A	--	49; Marion
Liberty Christian	Anderson	Lions		154	A	--	48; Madison

=== Pocket Athletic Conference ===
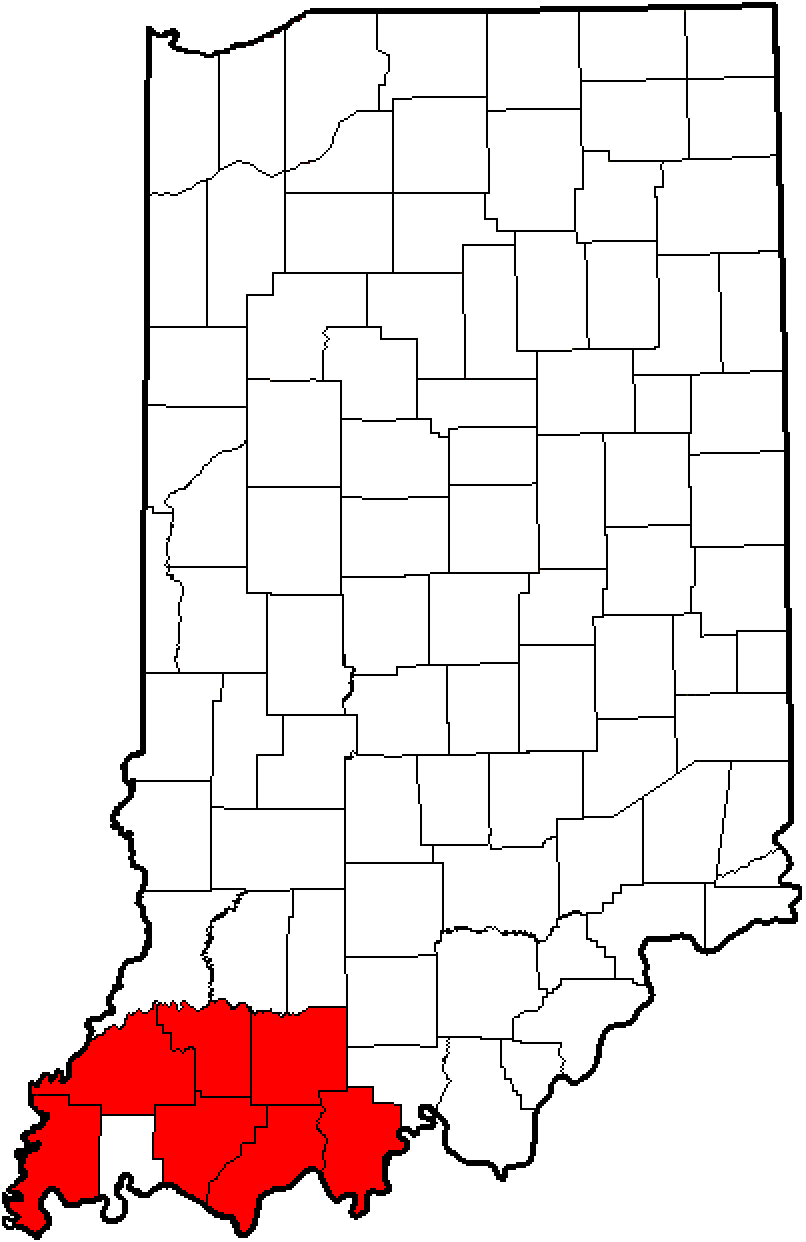
Location of PAC in Indiana

School	Mascot	Colors	Location	Size	Size Class	IHSAA Football	IHSAA Baseball	IHSAA Softball	County
Forest Park	Rangers		Ferdinand	444	AA	AA	AA	AA	19; Dubois
Gibson Southern	Titans		Fort Branch	710	AAA	AAA	AAA	AAAA	26; Gibson
Heritage Hills	Patriots		Lincoln City	674	AAA	AAA	AAA	AAA	74; Spencer
North Posey	Vikings		Poseyville	496	AA	AA	AA	AA	65; Posey
Pike Central	Chargers		Petersburg	669	AAA	AAA	AAA	AAA	63; Pike
Southridge	Raiders		Huntingburg	601	AAA	AAA	AAA	AAA	19; Dubois
South Spencer	Rebels		Rockport	498	AA	AA	AAA	AA	74; Spencer
Tecumseh	Braves		Lynnville	261	A	A	A	A	87; Warrick
Tell City	Marksmen		Tell City	462	AA	AA	AA	AA	62; Perry

Tecumseh is Independent in football but plays in the PAC in all other sports.

=== Porter County Conference ===
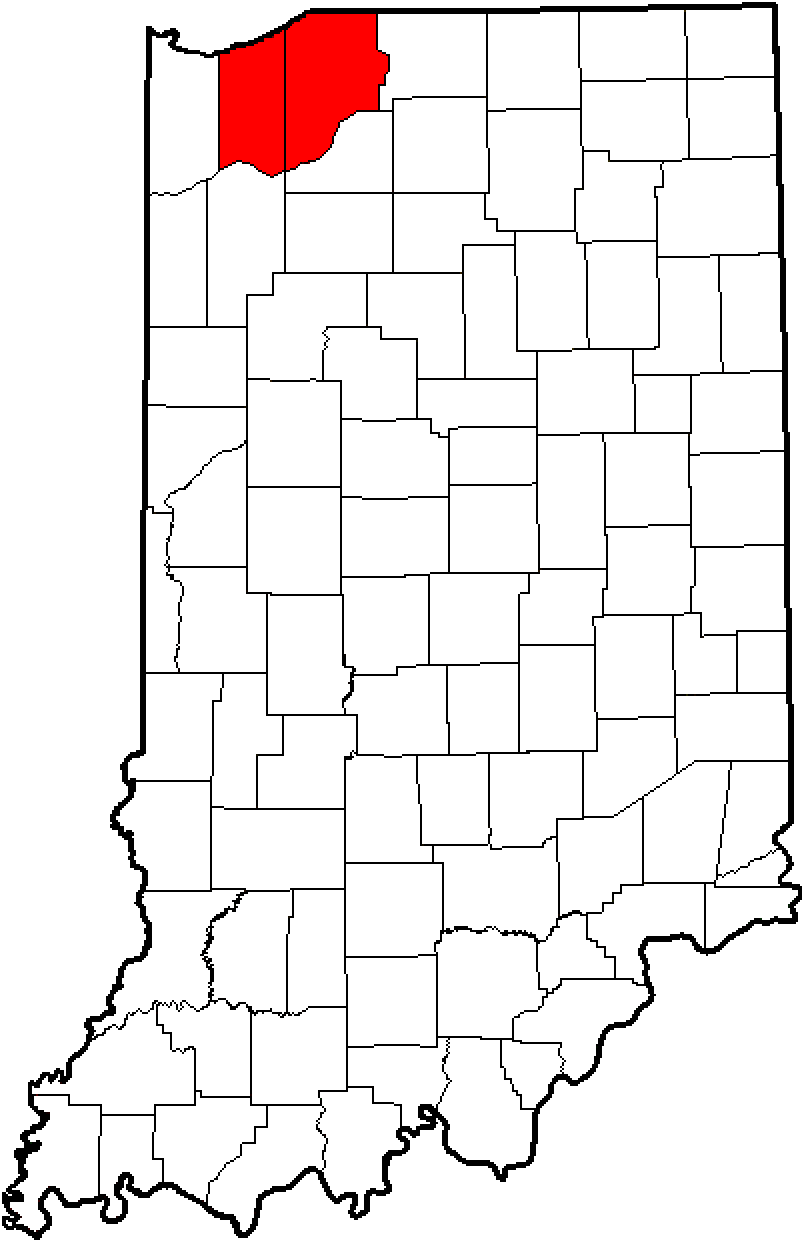
The Porter County Conference in Indiana.

School	Location	Mascot	Colors	Enrollment	IHSAA Class	IHSAA Football Class	County
Boone; Grove	Valparaiso	Wolves		543	AA	AA	64; Porter
Hanover; Central	Cedar Lake	Wildcats		580	AAA	--	45; Lake
Hebron	Hebron	Hawks		340	AA	--	64; Porter
Kouts	Kouts	Mustangs/ Fillies		257	A	--	64; Porter
LaCrosse	LaCrosse	Tigers		109	A	--	46; LaPorte
Morgan; Township	Valparaiso	Cherokees		220	A	--	64; Porter
South Central; Union Mills	Union Mills	Satellites		297	A	A	46; La Porte
Washington; Township	Valparaiso	Senators		264	A	--	64; Porter

- South Central plays football in the Greater South Shore Conference. Boone Grove is independent in football.

=== Sagamore Conference ===
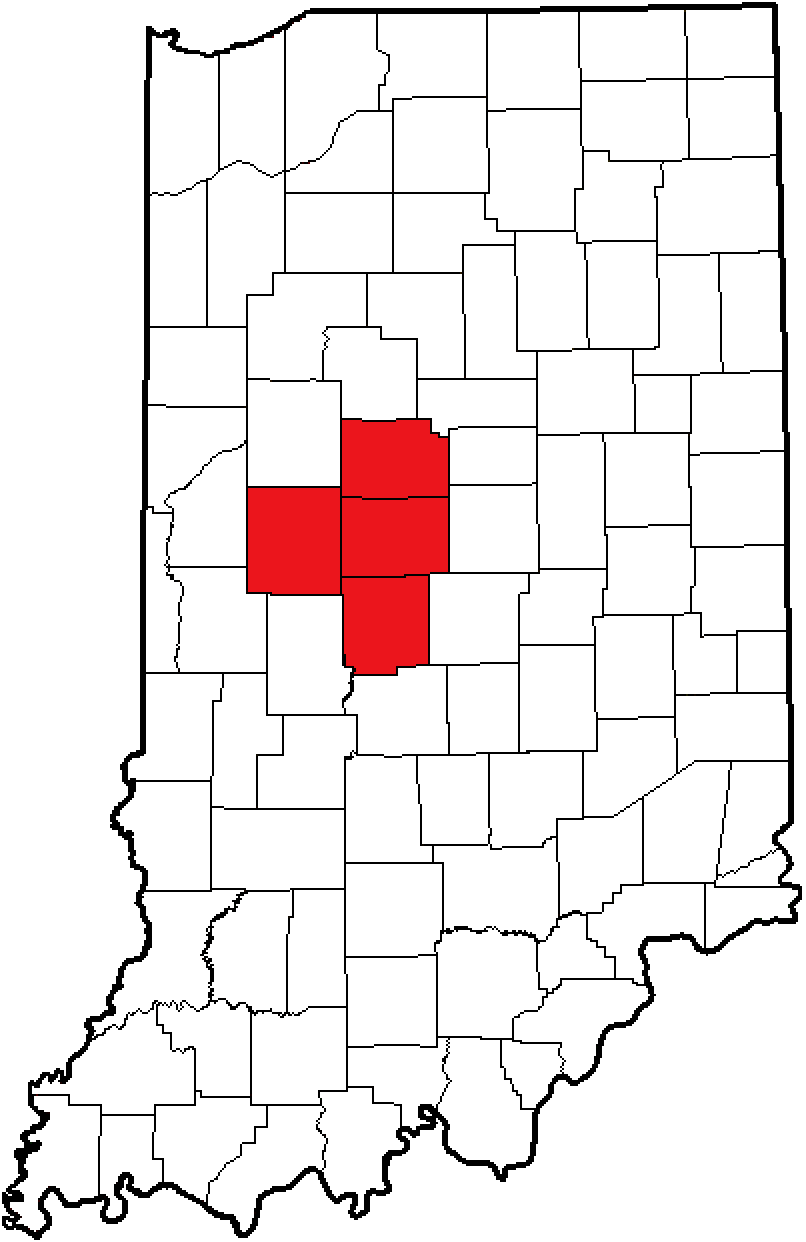
The Sagamore Conference in Indiana.

School	Location	Mascot	Colors	Enrollment	IHSAA Class	IHSAA Football Class	County
Crawfordsville	Crawfordsville	Athenians		689	AAA	AAA	54; Montgomery
Danville	Danville	Warriors		824	AAA	AAA	32; Hendricks
Frankfort	Frankfort	Hot Dogs		887	AAA	AAAA	12; Clinton
Lebanon	Lebanon	Tigers		1038	AAA	AAAA	06; Boone
North; Montgomery	Crawfordsville	Chargers		641	AAA	AAA	54; Montgomery
Southmont	Crawfordsville	Mounties		612	AAA	AAA	54; Montgomery
Tri-West	Lizton	Bruins		620	AAA	AAA	32; Hendricks
Western; Boone	Thorntown	Stars		592	AAA	AAA	06; Boone

=== Southern Athletic Conference ===
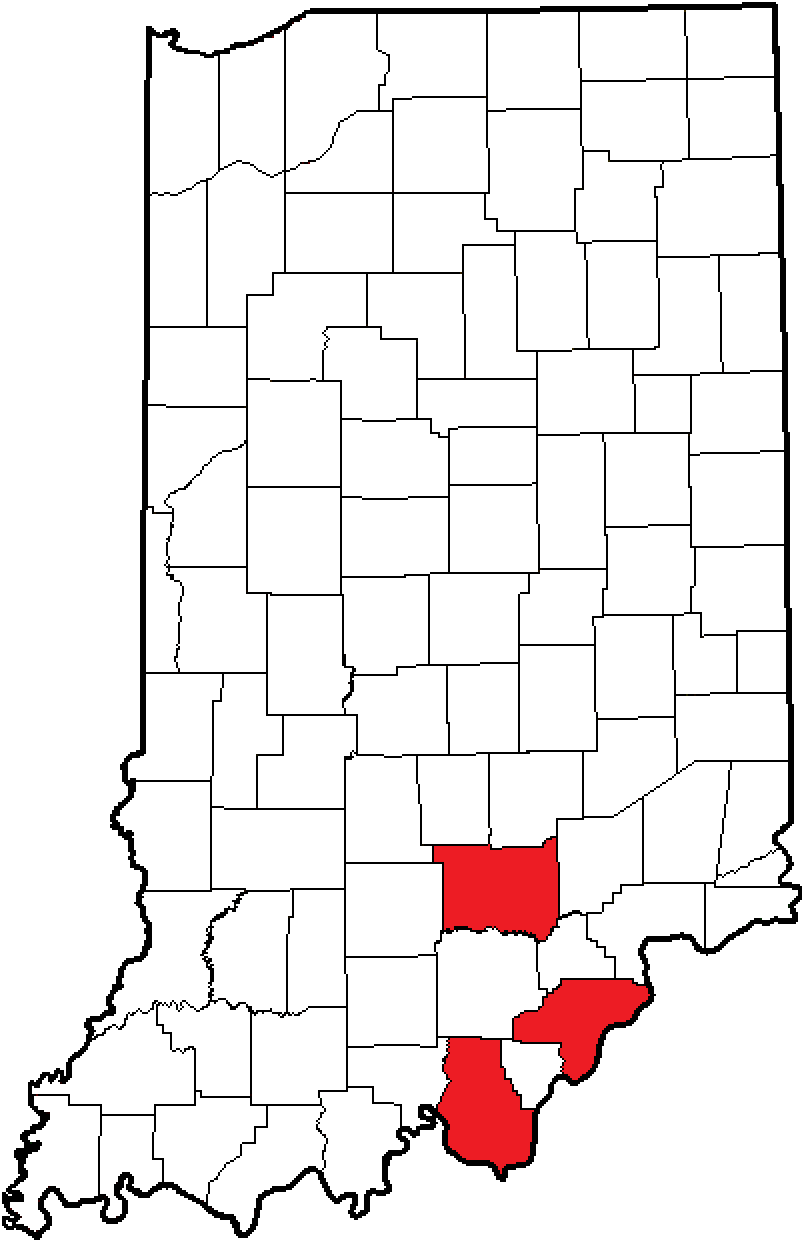
Location of the Southern Athletic Conference within Indiana

School	Location	Mascot	Colors	Enrollment	IHSAA Class	IHSAA Football Class	County
Borden	Borden	Braves		234	A	--	10; Clark
Crothersville	Crothersville	Tigers		173	A	--	36; Jackson
Henryville	Henryville	Hornets		372	A	--	10; Clark
Lanesville	Lanesville	Eagles		242	A	--	31; Harrison
New; Washington	New Washington	Mustangs		274	A	--	10; Clark
South Central; Elizabeth	Elizabeth	Rebels		246	A	--	31; Harrison

=== Southern Indiana Athletic Conference ===
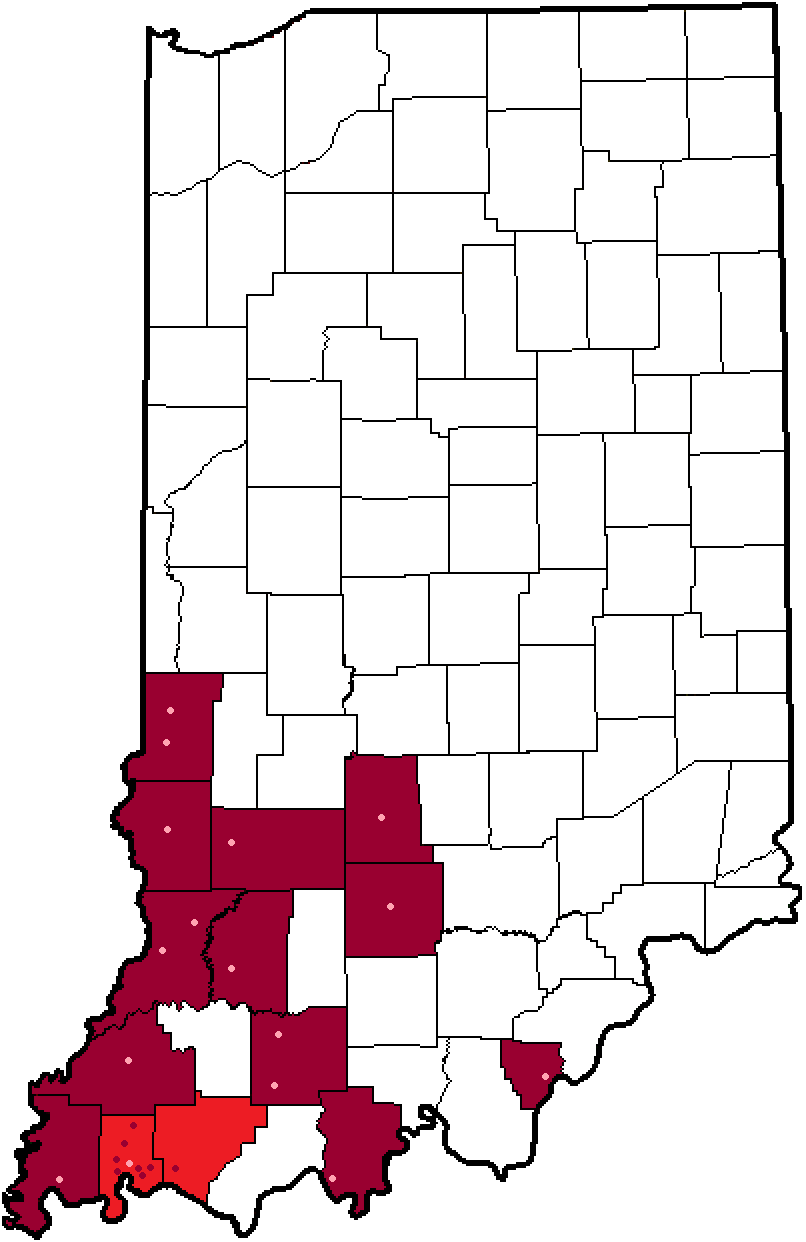
Current Southern Indiana Athletic Conference Members are in Maroon inside Vanderburgh and Warrick Counties. Former members are in pink inside Maroon Counties. The Pink dot in Vanderburgh County is Rex Mundi High School.

School	Mascot	Colors	Location	Enrollment	IHSAA Class	IHSAA Football Class	County
Castle	Knights		Newburgh	1,918	AAAA	AAAAA	87; Warrick
Evansville; Bosse	Bulldogs		Evansville	799	AAA	AAA	82; Vanderburgh
Evansville; Central	Bears		Evansville	1,486	AAAA	AAAA	82; Vanderburgh
Evansville; Harrison	Warriors		Evansville	1,483	AAAA	AAAA	82; Vanderburgh
Evansville; Mater Dei	Wildcats		Evansville	522	AA	AA	82; Vanderburgh
Evansville; North	Huskies		Evansville	1,585	AAAA	AAAAA	82; Vanderburgh
Evansville; F.J. Reitz	Panthers		Evansville	1,392	AAAA	AAAA	82; Vanderburgh
Evansville; Reitz Memorial	Tigers		Evansville	791	AAA	AAA	82; Vanderburgh

=== Southwestern Indiana Conference ===
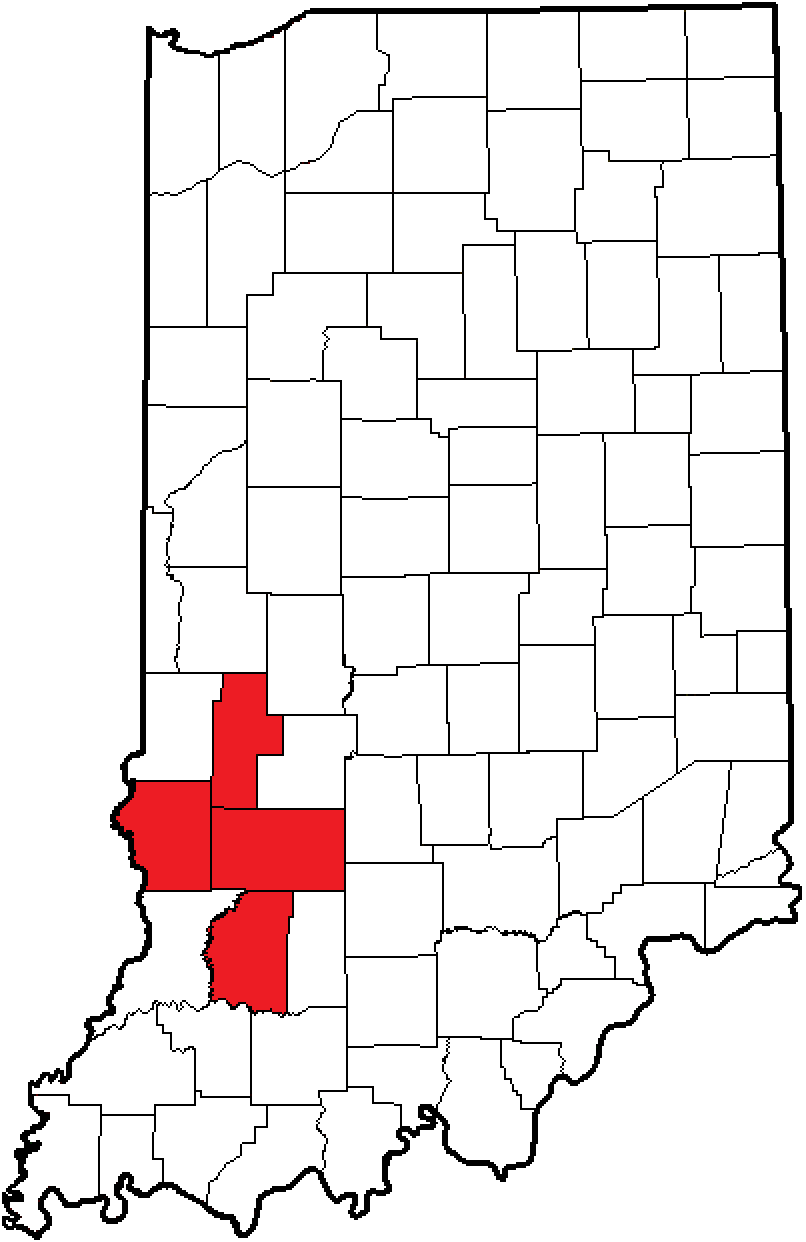
Location of the Southwestern Indiana Conference within Indiana.

School	Location	Mascot	Colors	Enrollment	IHSAA Class	IHSAA Football Class	County
Bloomfield	Bloomfield	Cardinals		337	AA	--	28; Greene
Clay; City	Clay City	Eels		272	A	--	11; Clay
Eastern; Greene	Bloomfield	Thunderbirds		406	AA	A	28; Greene
Linton; Stockton	Linton	Miners		344	AA	A	28; Greene
North Central; Farmersburg	Farmersburg	Thunderbirds		336	AA	A	77; Sullivan
North; Daviess	Elnora	Cougars		306	A	A	14; Daviess
Shakamak	Jasonville	Lakers		258	A	--	28; Greene
Union; Dugger	Dugger	Bulldogs		117	A	A	77; Sullivan
White River; Valley	Switz City	Wolverines		253	A	--	28; Greene

=== Southwest Seven Football Conference ===
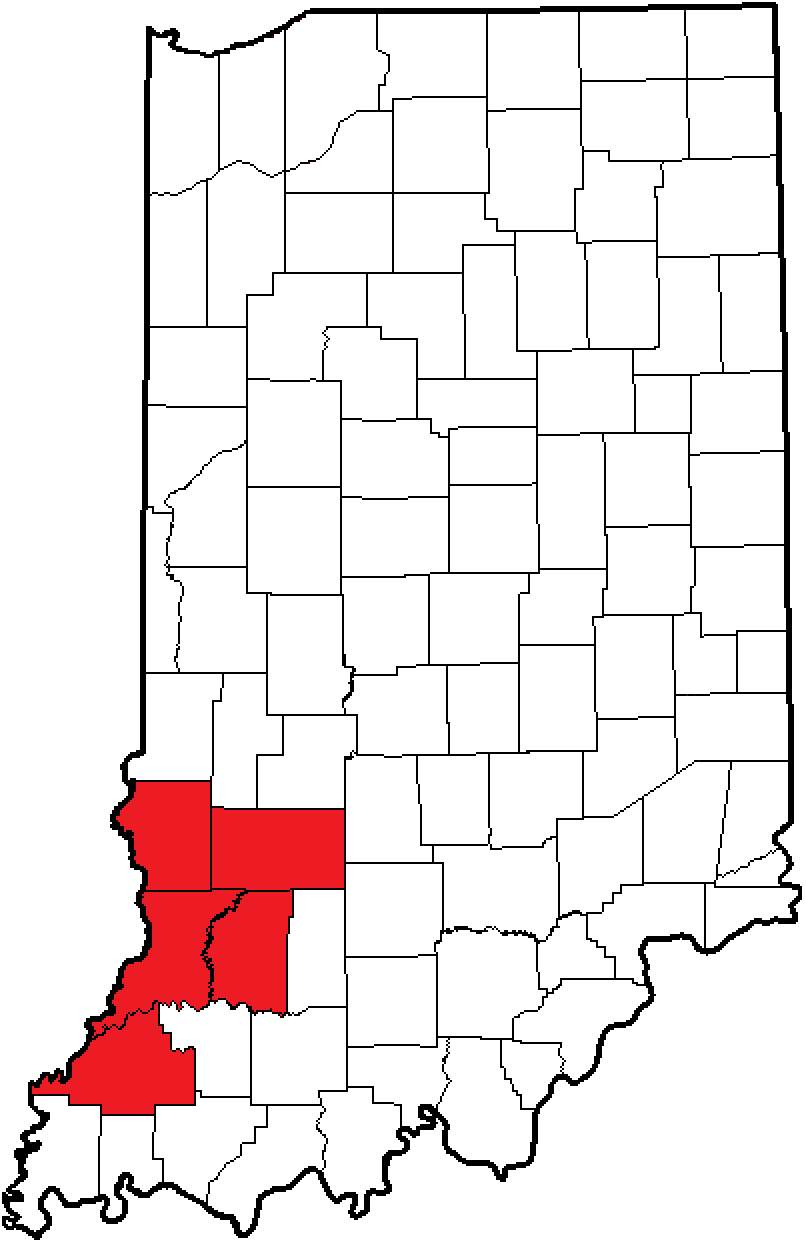
The Southwest Seven Conference within Indiana

School	Location	Mascot	Colors	Enrollment	IHSAA Football Class	County
Eastern; Greene	Bloomfield	Thunderbirds		406	A	28; Greene
Linton; Stockton	Linton	Miners		344	A	28; Greene
North Central; Farmersburg	Farmersburg	Thunderbirds		336	A	77; Sullivan
North; Daviess	Elnora	Cougars		306	A	14; Daviess
North; Knox	Bicknell	Warriors		408	A	42; Knox
Union; Dugger	Dugger	Bulldogs		117	A	77; Sullivan
Wood; Memorial	Oakland City	Trojans		292	A	26; Gibson

=== Summit Athletic Conference ===
02 Allen County
Fort Wayne, Indiana

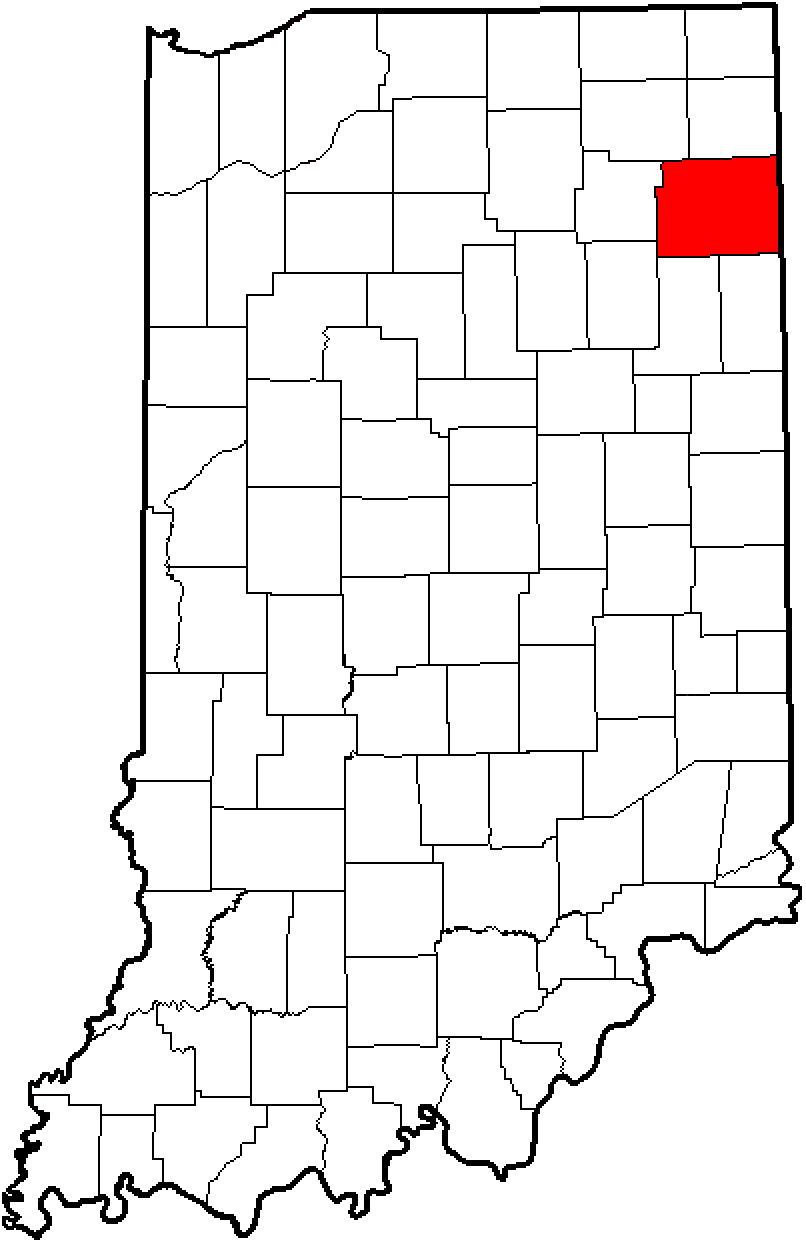
The Summit Conference in Indiana.

School	Mascot	Colors	Enrollment	IHSAA Class	IHSAA Football Class
Fort Wayne; Bishop Dwenger	Saints		1,013	AAA	AAAA
Fort Wayne; Bishop Luers	Knights		544	AA	AA
Fort Wayne; Concordia Lutheran	Cadets		645	AAA	AAA
Fort Wayne; North Side	Redskins		1,756	AAAA	AAAAA
Fort Wayne; Northrop	Bruins		2,277	AAAA	AAAAA
Fort Wayne; R. Nelson Snider	Panthers		2,035	AAAA	AAAAA
Fort Wayne; South Side	Archers		1,596	AAAA	AAAAA
Fort Wayne; Wayne	Generals		1,582	AAAA	AAAAA

=== Three Rivers Conference ===
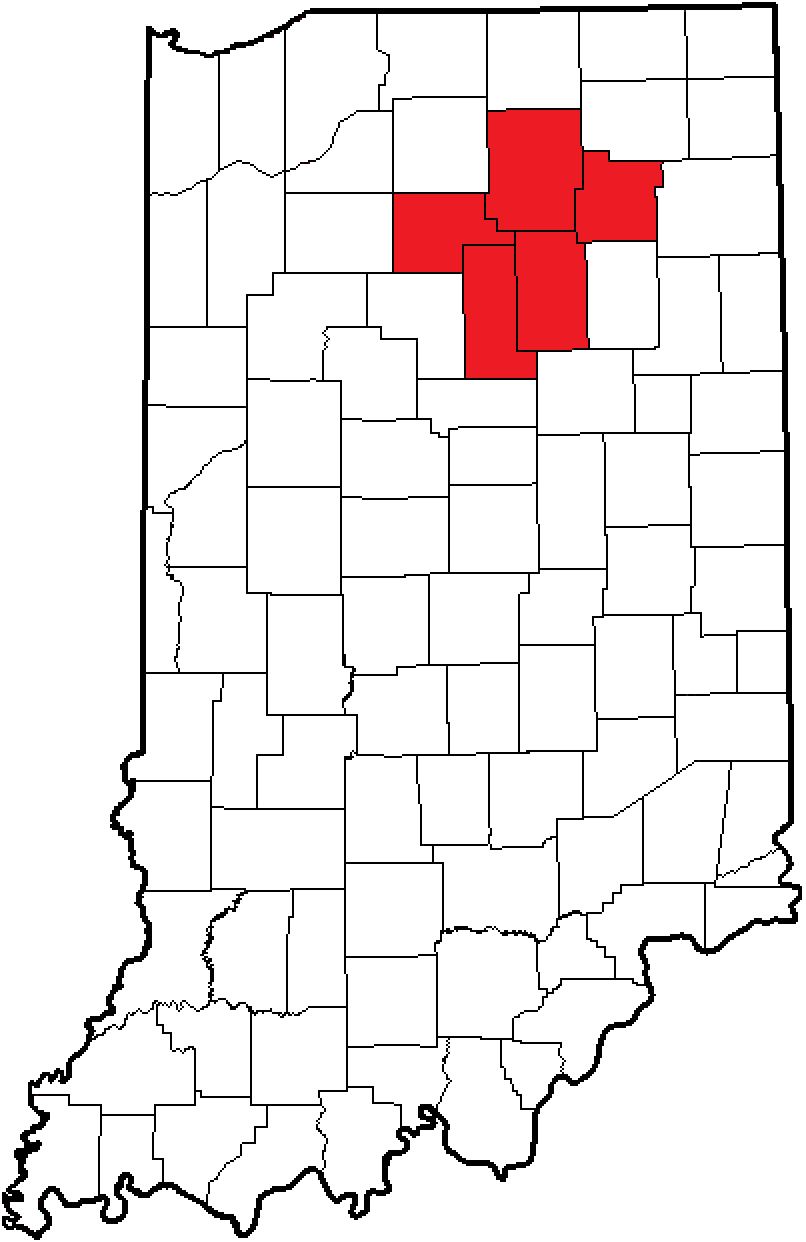
The Three Rivers Conference in Indiana.

School	Location	Mascot	Colors	Enrollment	IHSAA Class	IHSAA Football Class	# / County
Manchester	North; Manchester	Squires		432	AA	AA	85; Wabash
Northfield	Wabash	Norsemen		389	AA	A	85; Wabash
North; Miami	Denver	Warriors		349	AA	A	52; Miami
Rochester; Community	Rochester	Zebras		565	AA	AA	25; Fulton
Southwood	Wabash	Knights		413	AA	A	85; Wabash
Tippecanoe; Valley	Akron	Vikings		618	AAA	AAA	43; Kosciusko
Wabash	Wabash	Apachees		447	AA	AA	85; Wabash
Whitko	South Whitley	Wildcats		595	AAA	AAA	92; Whitley

=== Tri-Eastern Conference ===
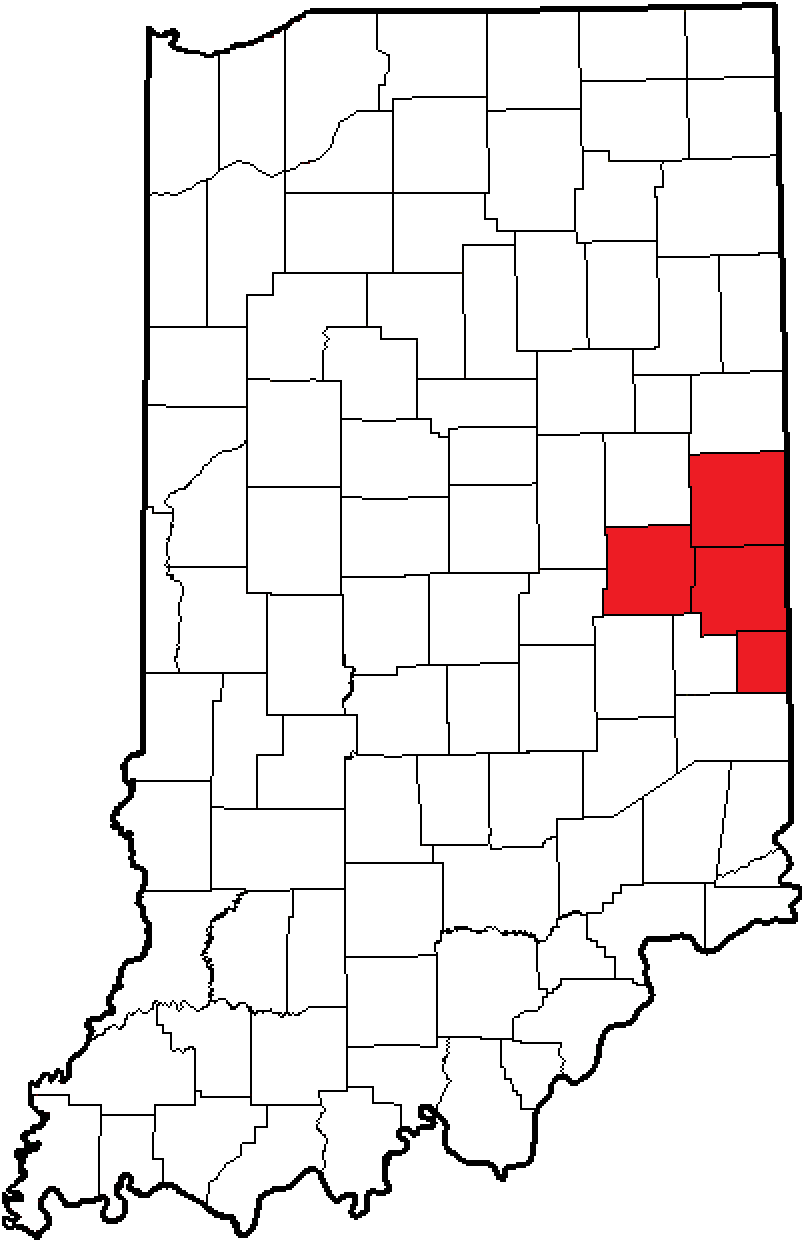
The Tri-Eastern Conference in Indiana.

School	Location	Mascot	Colors	Size	IHSAA Class	IHSAA Football Class	County
Cambridge City; Lincoln	Cambridge; City	Golden Eagles		400	AA	A	89; Wayne
Centerville	Centerville	Bulldogs		552	AA	AA	89; Wayne
Hagerstown	Hagerstown	Tigers		366	AA	A	89; Wayne
Northeastern	Fountain; City	Knights		342	AA	A	89; Wayne
Tri	Straughn	Titans		301	A	A	33; Henry
Union City; Community	Union; City	Indians		280	A	A	68; Randolph
Union; County	Liberty	Patriots		467	AA	AA	81; Union
Winchester; Community	Winchester	Golden Falcons		490	AA	AA	68; Randolph

=== Wabash River Conference ===
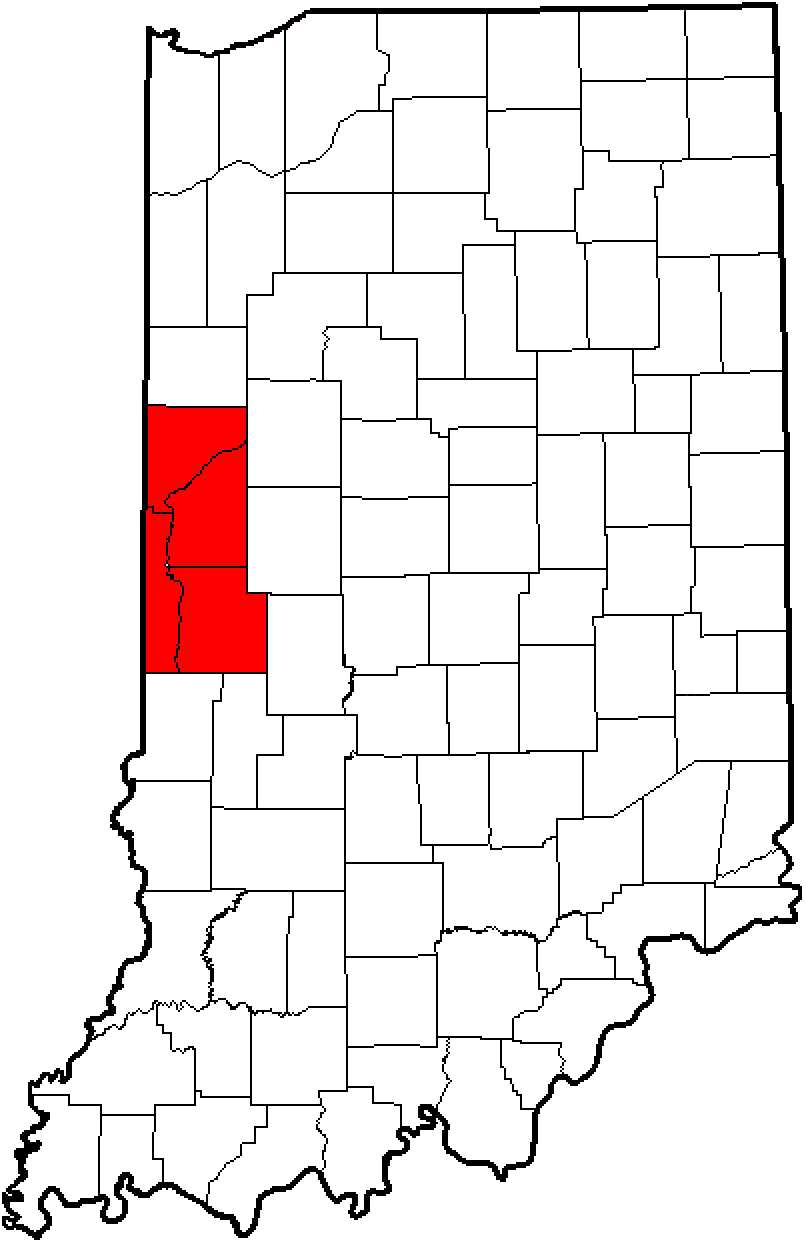
The Wabash Conference in Indiana.

School	Location	Mascot	Colors	Enrollment	IHSAA Class	IHSAA Football Class	County
Attica	Attica	Red Ramblers		283	A	A	23; Fountain
Covington	Covington	Trojans		292	A	A	23; Fountain
Fountain; Central	Veedersburg	Mustangs		435	AA	AA	23; Fountain
North; Vermillion	Cayuga	Falcons		238	A	A	83; Vermillion
Riverton; Parke	Montezuma	Panthers		316	A	A	61; Parke
Rockville	Rockville	Rox		248	A	A	61; Parke
Seeger	West; Lebanon	Patriots		427	AA	AA	86; Warren
Turkey; Run	Marshall	Warriors		174	A	A	61; Parke

=== West Central Conference ===
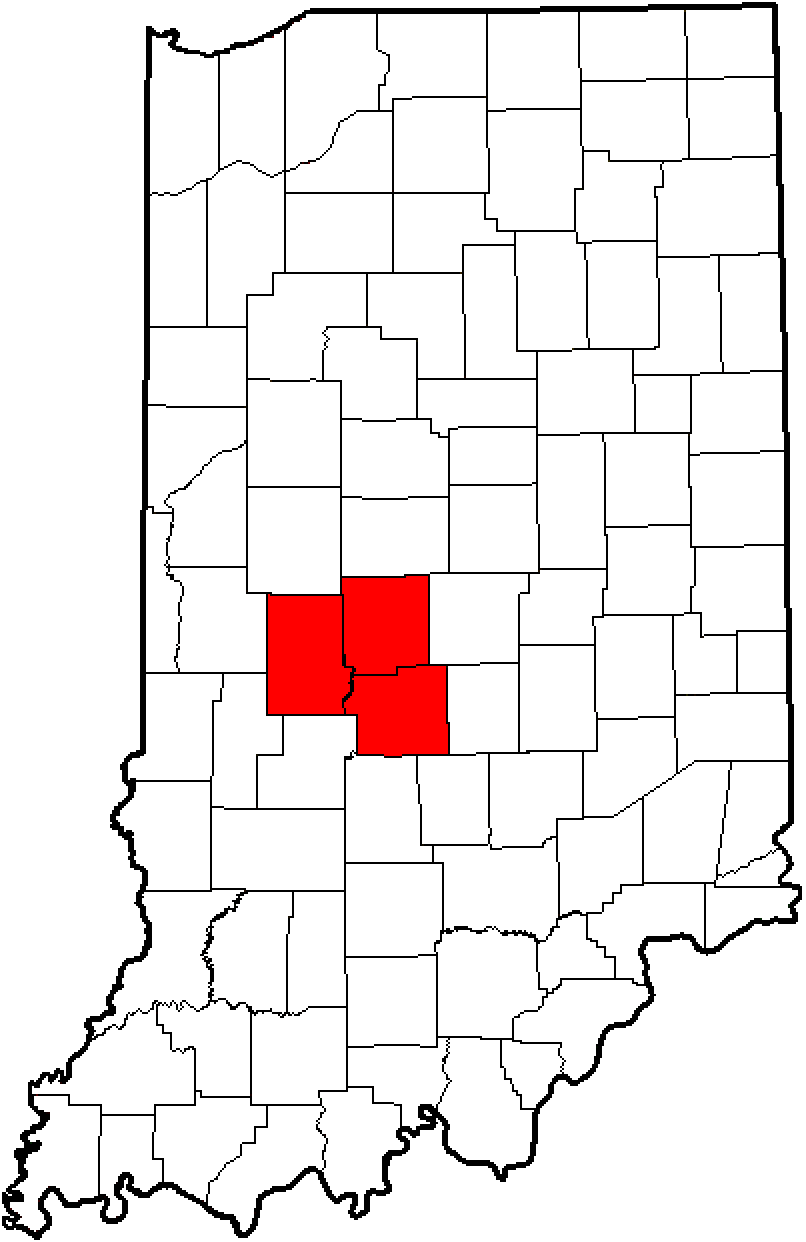
The West Central Conference in Indiana.

School	Location	Mascot	Colors	Enrollment	IHSAA Class	IHSAA Football Class	County
Cascade	Clayton	Cadets		533	AA	AA	33; Hendricks
Cloverdale	Cloverdale	Clovers		399	AA	A	67; Putnam
Greencastle	Greencastle	Tiger Cubs		601	AAA	AAA	67; Putnam
Monrovia	Monrovia	Bulldogs		488	AA	AA	55; Morgan
North; Putnam	Roachdale	Cougars		590	AAA	AA	67; Putnam
South; Putnam	Putnamville	Eagles		436	AA	AA	67; Putnam

=== Western Indiana Conference ===
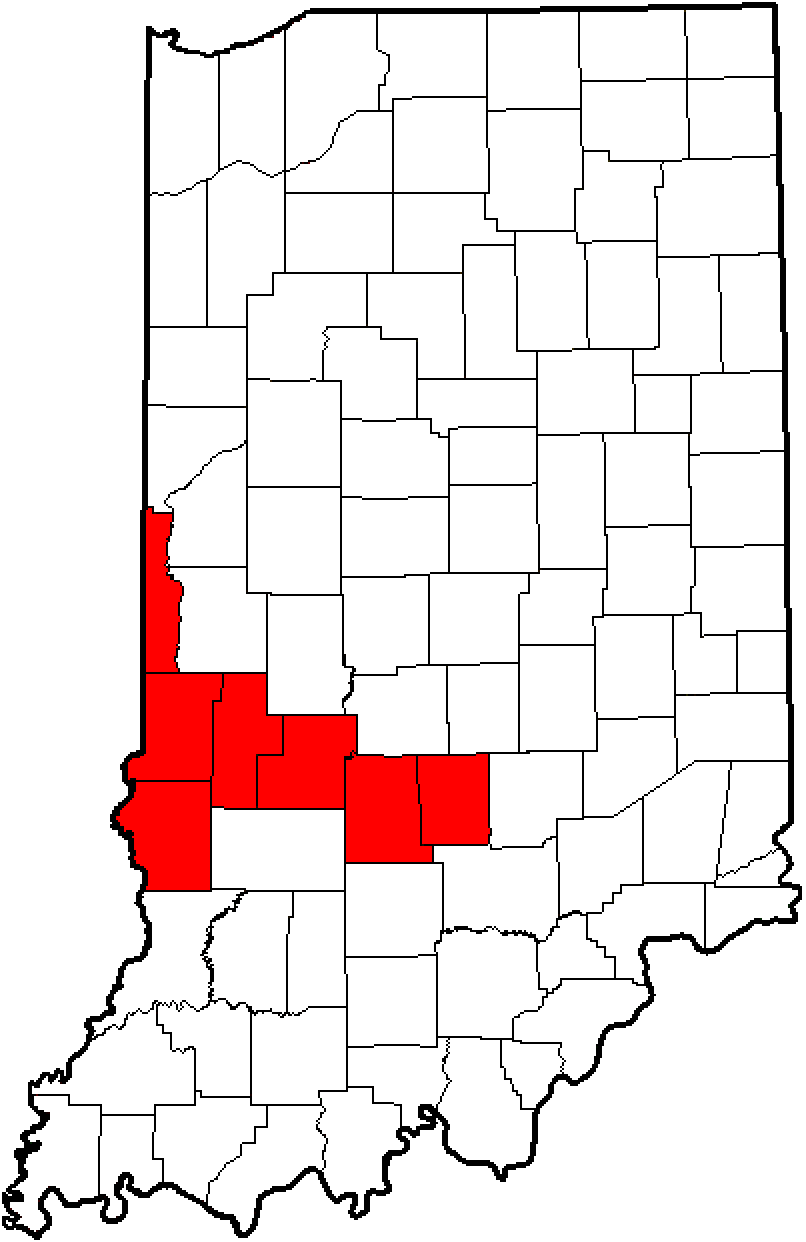
The Western Indiana Conference.

School	Location	Mascot	Colors	Enrollment	IHSAA Class	IHSAA Football Class	County
Brown; County	Nashville	Eagles		755	AAA	AAA	7 Brown
Edgewood	Ellettsville	Mustangs		833	AAA	AAA	53; Monroe
Northview	Brazil	Knights		1,142	AAAA	AAAA	11; Clay
Owen; Valley	Spencer	Patriots		908	AAA	AAAA	60; Owen
South; Vermilion	Clinton	Wildcats		583	AAA	AA	83; Vermillion
Sullivan	Sullivan	Golden Arrows		543	AAA	AA	77; Sullivan
West; Vigo	West; Terre Haute	Vikings		640	AAA	AAA	84; Vigo

== See also ==
- Page 1: Allen County Conference - Metropolitan Interscholastic Conference
- Page 2: Mid-Eastern Conference - Northwestern Conference
