= Tri-River Conference =

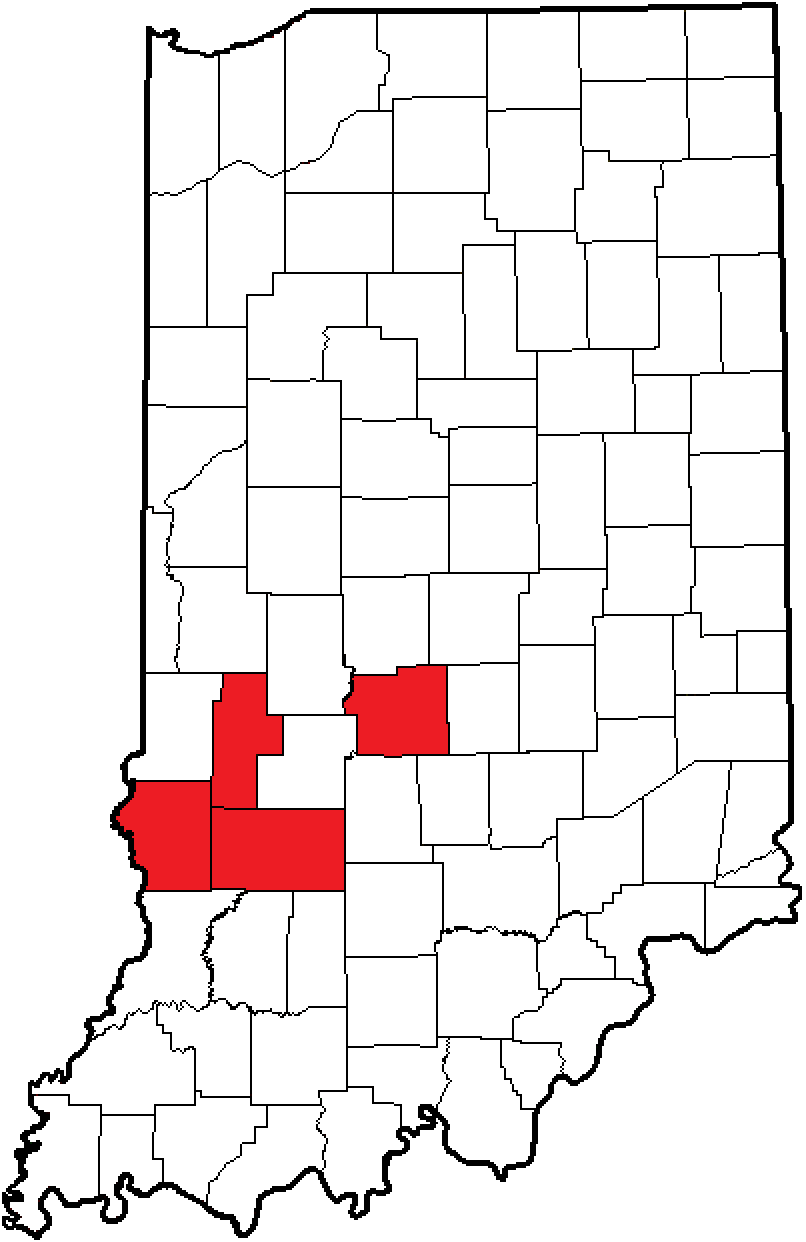
The Tri-River Conference in Indiana.

The Tri-River Conference, established around 1965, was a seven-member IHSAA-sanctioned conference located within Clay, Greene, Morgan, and Sullivan counties in Indiana. It was named for the southern Eel, White, and Wabash rivers which flow through the territory of the conference. Clay City, Linton Stockton, Shakamak, and Union (Dugger) high schools also participated in the Southwestern Indiana Conference at the same time. The conference disbanded at the end of the 2009–2010 school year.

== Former members ==
| School | Location | Mascot | Colors | County | Year joined | Previous conference | Year left | Conference joined |
|---|---|---|---|---|---|---|---|---|
| Clay City^{1} | Clay City | Eels | | 11; Clay | 1964 | Clay County | 2010 | SW Indiana |
| Montezuma | Montezuma | Aztecs | | 61; Parke | 1964 | Parke County | 1986 | none (consolidated into Riverton Parke) |
| Rosedale | Rosedale | Hotshots | | 61; Parke | 1964 | Parke County | 1986 | none (consolidated into Riverton Parke) |
| Shakamak^{2} | Jasonville | Lakers | | 28; Greene | 1964 | Western Indiana | 2010 | SW Indiana |
| Stauton | Staunton | Yellow Jackets | | 11; Clay | 1964 | Clay County | 1984 | none (consolidated into Northview) |
| Terre Haute Schulte^{3} | Terre Haute | Golden Bears | | 84; Vigo | 1964 | Western Indiana | 1977 | none (school closed) |
| Terre Haute State | Terre Haute | Little Sycamores | | 84; Vigo | 1964 | Western Indiana | 1978 | none (school closed) |
| Van Buren | Carbon | Blue Devils | | 11; Clay | 1964 | Clay County | 1984 | none (consolidated into Northview) |
| Union (Dugger)^{4} | Dugger | Bulldogs | | 77; Sullivan | 1965 | Sullivan County | 2010 | SW Indiana |
| North Central (Farmersburg) | Farmersburg | Thunderbirds | | 77; Sullivan | 1977 | Independents (TCC (Western) 1967) | 2010 | SW Indiana |
| Eminence | Eminence | Eels | | 55; Morgan | 1986 | Independents (L4C 1974) | 2010 | Independents (GIC 2019) |
| Sullivan | Sullivan | Golden Arrows | | 77; Sullivan | 1986 | Independents (WIC 1982) | 1999 | Western Indiana |
| Linton; Stockton^{5} | Linton | Miners | | 28; Greene | 1991 | SW Indiana | 2010 | SW Indiana |

1. Played concurrently in the TRC and SWIAC 1992–2010.
2. Played concurrently in the TRC and SWIAC 1968–2010.
3. Played concurrently in the TRC and WIC throughout membership
4. Played concurrently in the TRC and SWIAC 1974–2010. School was known as Dugger before 1965.
5. Played concurrently in the TRC and SWIAC throughout membership.

== Resources ==
- IHSAA Conferences
- IHSAA Directory
