= Tri-County Conference (Western Indiana) =

The Tri-County Conference (not to be confused with conferences of the same name located in the northern and southern portions of the state) was a high school sports league that existed until the late 1960s. Originally the Sullivan County Conference, the SCC added L&M and Midland from the folding Greene County Conference, then assumed the TCC name when Cory from Clay County was added two years later. The league was hit hard by consolidation that next year, and had three members for two more years until Cory was closed.

School	Location	Mascot	Colors	Year joined	Previous conference	Year left	Conference joined
Carlisle	Carlisle	Indians		<1932	Independents	1965	none (consolidated into Sullivan)
Dugger^{1}	Dugger	Bulldogs		<1932; 1958	Independents; Western Indiana	1950; 1965	Western Indiana; Tri-River
Fairbanks	Fairbanks	Trojans		<1932	Independents	1957	none (consolidated into North Central (F'burg))
Farmersburg	Farmersburg	Plowboys		<1932	Independents	1957	none (consolidated into North Central (F'burg))
Graysville	Graysville	Greyhounds		<1932	Independents	1962	none (consolidated into Sullivan)
Hymera	Hymera	Shakamaks		<1932	Independents	1965	none (consolidated into North Central (F'burg))
Merom	Merom	Beavers		<1932	Independents	1953	none (consolidated into Gill Township)
New Lebanon	New Lebanon	Tigers		<1932	Independents	1953	none (consolidated into Gill Township)
Pleasantville	Pleasantville	Blue Streaks		<1932	Independents	1965	none (consolidated into Union (Dugger))
Shelburn	Shelburn	Panthers		<1932	Independents	1957	none (consolidated into North Central (F'burg))
Sullivan	Sullivan	Golden Arrows		<1932	Independents	1936	Southern Indiana
Gill Township	Merom	Rockets		1953	none (new school)	1957	none (consolidated into Sullivan)
North Central (Farmersburg)	Farmersburg	Thunderbirds		1957	none (new school)	1967	Independents (TRC 1977)
L & M	Marco	Braves		1961	Greene County	1967	Independents (SW IN 1968)
Midland	Midland	Middies		1961	Greene County	1964	none (consolidated into Shakamak
Cory	Cory	Apple Boys		1963	Clay County	1967	none (consolidated into Clay City)

1. Dugger changed its name to Union in 1965.
