= Southwest Football Conference =

Sports league in Indiana, US

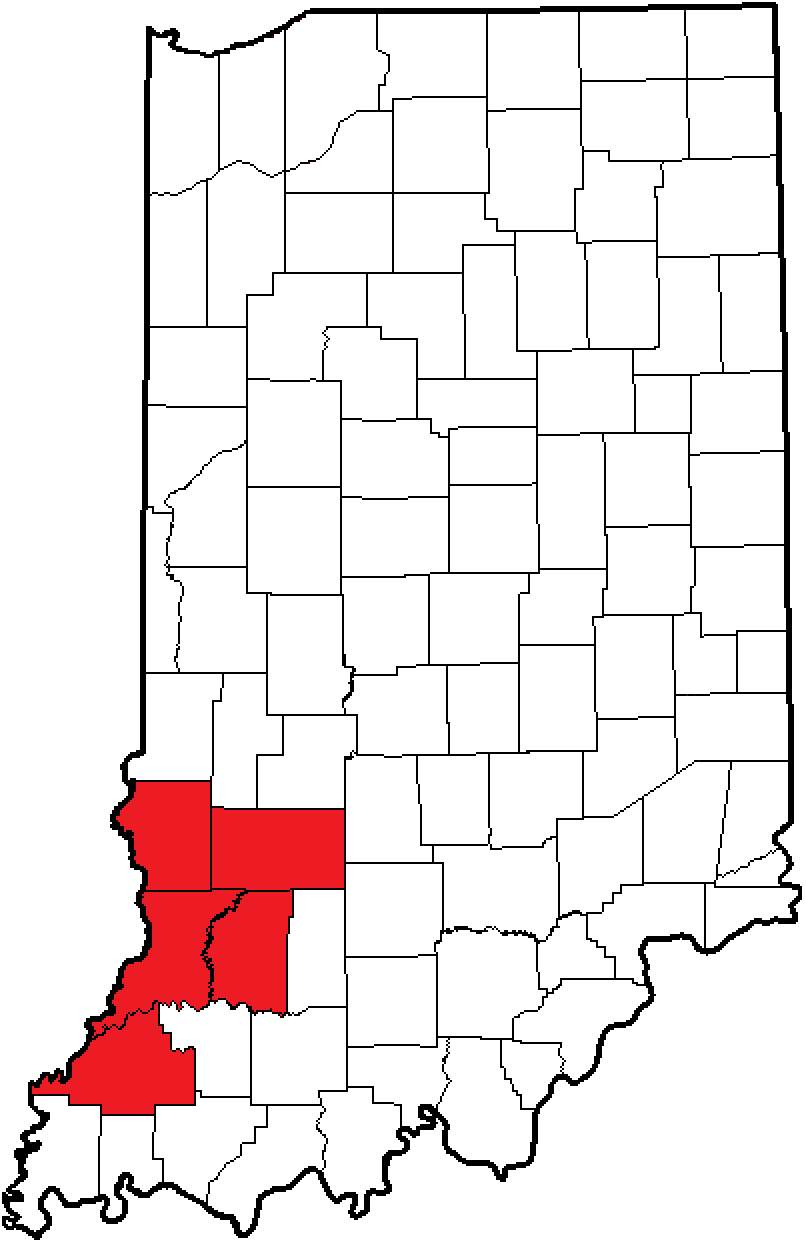
The Southwest Seven Conference at its height

The Southwest Football Conference is a five-member IHSAA-sanctioned conference currently spanning Daviess, Greene, Knox, and Putnam counties in Southwest and West Central Indiana. It was founded in 2004 as the Southwest Seven Conference, by teams in southwestern Indiana whose regular conferences do not play the sport. The conference lost a member in 2013, as Linton-Stockton pursued an independent schedule to better prepare themselves for the playoffs. The conference lost another in 2014, as Union (Dugger) was closed, then lost Wood Memorial in 2018 after the school's football program was shuttered. Cloverdale joined the conference in 2026, leaving the Western Indiana Conference.

== Membership ==
School	Location	Mascot	Colors	Enrollment (2008)	IHSAA Class	County	Main Conference
Eastern; Greene	Bloomfield	Thunderbirds		440	AA	28; Greene	SW Indiana
North Central; Farmersburg	Farmersburg	Thunderbirds		519	AA	77; Sullivan	SW Indiana
North; Knox	Bicknell	Warriors		486	AA	42; Knox	Blue Chip
North; Daviess	Elnora	Cougars		350	A	14; Daviess	SW Indiana
Cloverdale	Cloverdale	Clovers		283	A	67; Putnam	WIC

=== Former members ===
School	Location	Mascot	Colors	IHSAA Class	County	Year joined	Year left
Linton; Stockton	Linton	Miners		A	28; Greene	2004	2013
Union; Dugger	Dugger	Bulldogs		N/A	77; Sullivan	2004	2014
Wood; Memorial	Oakland City	Trojans		A(A)	26; Gibson	2004	2018

== Champions ==
#	Team	Seasons
7	Linton-Stockton	2004^{1}, 2005, 2006, 2007, 2008, 2011, 2012
6	North Daviess	2009, 2010, 2022, 2024, 2025, 2026
5	North Knox	2014, 2019, 2020, 2021, 2023
3	Eastern Greene	2015, 2016, 2017
2	North Central	2013, 2018
0	Cloverdale	
0	Union (Dugger)	
0	Wood Memorial	

1. Unofficial title, since a full conference schedule was not played. However, Linton-Stockton played a full conference schedule and finished 6–0.

== Resources ==
- AlmanacSports.com Southwest Seven Conference
- Southwest Seven Conference Standings
