= Southwestern Indiana Conference =

High school athletic conference in Indiana

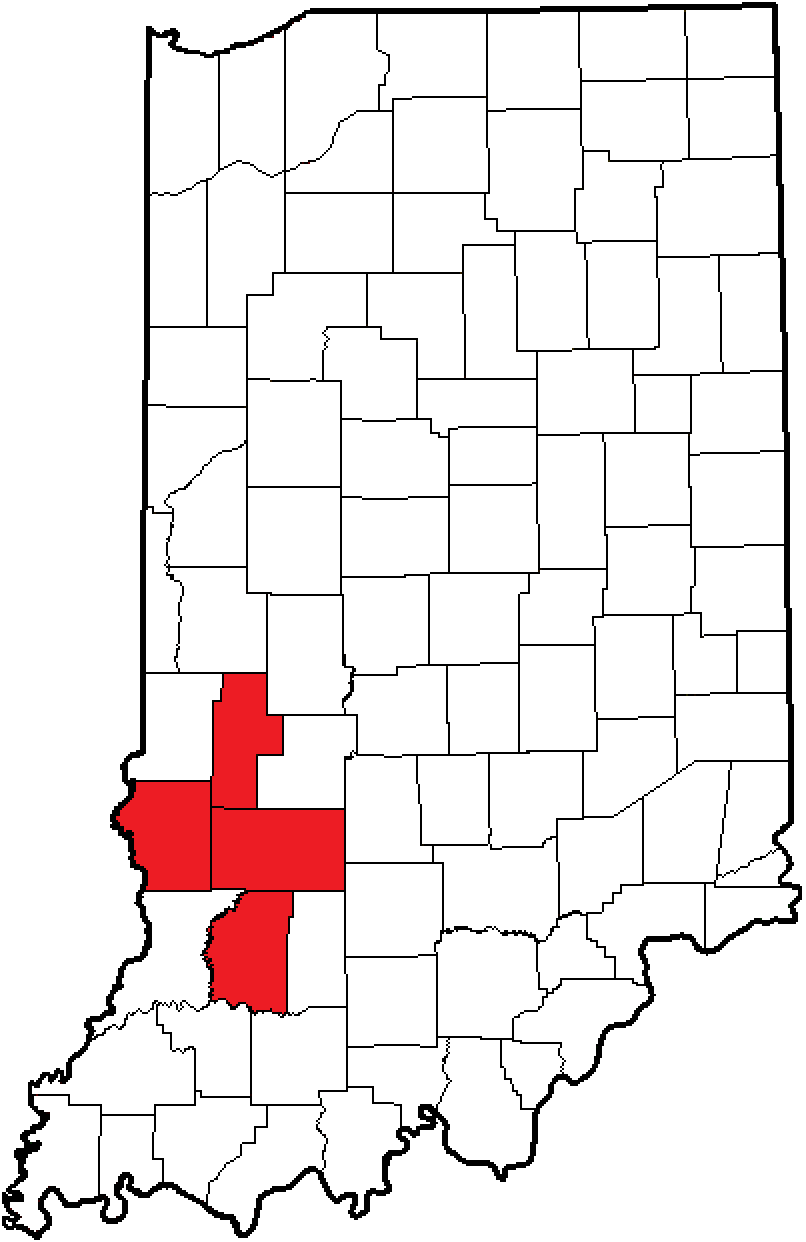
Location of the Southwestern Indiana Athletic Conference within Indiana.

The Southwestern Indiana Athletic Conference (SWIAC), is an eight-member IHSAA-sanctioned athletic conference located within Clay, Daviess, Greene and Sullivan Counties in Southwest and West Central Indiana. North Central (Farmersburg) joined in 2010 with the folding of the Tri-River Conference. Prior to that time, Clay City, Linton Stockton, Shakamak, and Union (Dugger) also participated in the Tri-River Conference concurrently while playing in the SWIAC. The conference was originally formed in 1939, but information on early membership between then and 1958 is incomplete.

== Membership ==
School	Location	Mascot	Colors	Enrollment	IHSAA Class	County	Year joined	Previous conference
Bloomfield^{1}	Bloomfield	Cardinals		358	AA	28; Greene	1939	White River Valley
Clay; City^{2}	Clay City	Eels		278	A	11; Clay	1992	Tri-River
Eastern; Greene	Bloomfield	Thunderbirds		440	AA	28; Greene	1962	none (new school)
Linton; Stockton^{2}	Linton	Miners		404	AA	28; Greene	1974	Western Indiana
North Central (Farmersburg)	Farmersburg	Thunderbirds		303	A	77; Sullivan	2010	Tri-River
North; Daviess	Elnora	Cougars		321	A	14; Daviess	1986	Blue Chip Conference
Shakamak^{2}	Jasonville	Lakers		256	A	28; Greene	1968	Tri-River
White River; Valley	Switz City	Wolverines		273	A	28; Greene	1990	none (new school)

1. Bloomfield played concurrently in the SWIAC and Blue Chip Conference from 1968 to 1985.
2. Clay City and Shakamak were both concurrently in the SWIAC and TRC from joining the SWIAC until the TRC's demise in 2010. Linton-Stockton joined the TRC in 1991 while playing simultaneously in both leagues until 2010.

=== Former members ===
School	Location	Mascot	Colors	County	Year joined	Previous conference	Year left	Conference joined
Barr Township	Montgomery	Vikings		14; Daviess	1939	Daviess County	1954	Daviess County
Ellettsville	Ellettsville	Golden Eagles		53; Monroe	1939	Tri-County (Central)	1964	none (consolidated into Edgewood)
French Lick	French Lick	Red Devils		59; Orange	1939	Southeastern Indiana/Orange County	1954	Independents (consolidated into Springs Valley 1957)
Loogootee^{1}	Loogootee	Lions		51; Martin	1939	Martin County	1970	Blue Chip
Oolitic	Oolitic	Bearcats		47; Lawrence	1939	Southeastern Indiana	1974	none (consolidated into Bedford-North Lawrence)
Plainville	Plainville	Midgets		14; Daviess	1939	Daviess County	1940	Daviess County
Shoals^{1, 2}	Shoals	Jug Rox		51; Martin	1939; 1962	Martin County; Independents	1955; 1979	Independents; Blue Chip
West Baden	West Baden	Sprudels		59; Orange	1939	Orange County	1954	Independents (consolidated into Springs Valley 1957)
Solsberry	Solsberry	Hornets		59; Greene	1939	Greene County	1960	Independents (consolidated into Eastern Greene 1960)
Spencer	Spencer	Cops		60; Owen	1940	White River Valley	1970	none (consolidated into Owen Valley)
Needmore	Needmore	Hilltoppers		47; Lawrence	pre-1948	Lawrence County	1974	none (consolidated into Bedford-North Lawrence)
Shawswick	Shawswick	Farmers		47; Lawrence	pre-1948	Lawrence County	1974	none (consolidated into Bedford-North Lawrence)
Odon	Odon	Bulldogs		14; Daviess	1954	Daviess County	1968	none (consolidated into North Daviess)
Central (Switz City)	Switz City	Tigers		28; Greene	1956	Greene County	1990	none (consolidated into White River Valley)
Worthington	Worthington	Ramblers		28; Greene	1956	Greene County	1990	none (consolidated into White River Valley)
Edgewood	Ellettsville	Mustangs		53; Monroe	1964	none (new school)	1970	West Central
L & M	Marco	Braves		28; Greene	1968	Independents (TCC (Western) 1977)	1990	none (consolidated into White River Valley)
Union (Dugger)^{2}	Dugger	Bulldogs		77; Sullivan	1974	Tri-River	2014	none (consolidated into North Central (F'burg)^{3})

1. Loogootee and Shoals played concurrently in the SWIAC and MCC 1939–43.
2. Shoals played concurrently in the SWIAC and Lost River Conference from 1971 to 1974, and in the SWIAC and BCC from 1977 to 1979.
3. Union played in the SWIAC and TRC concurrently from 1974 to 2010.
4. Union was closed as a public school in 2014, however, a charter school was formed the same year carrying the history of the school. The new Union played as a non-IHSAA independent until 2018, when it joined the Southern Roads Conference.

== State Championships ==
=== Bloomfield (1) ===
- 1998 Girls Basketball

=== Linton Stockton (4) ===
- 1910 Track and Field
- 2016 Football
- 2020 Girls Basketball
- 2021 Girls Basketball

=== North Central (1) ===
- 2015 Softball

=== North Daviess (1) ===
- 2022 Boys Basketball

=== Shakamak (2) ===
- 2008 Baseball
- 2014 Baseball

== Resources ==
- IHSAA Conferences
- IHSAA Directory
- IHSAA State Championship History
