= Sullivan, Indiana =

- City
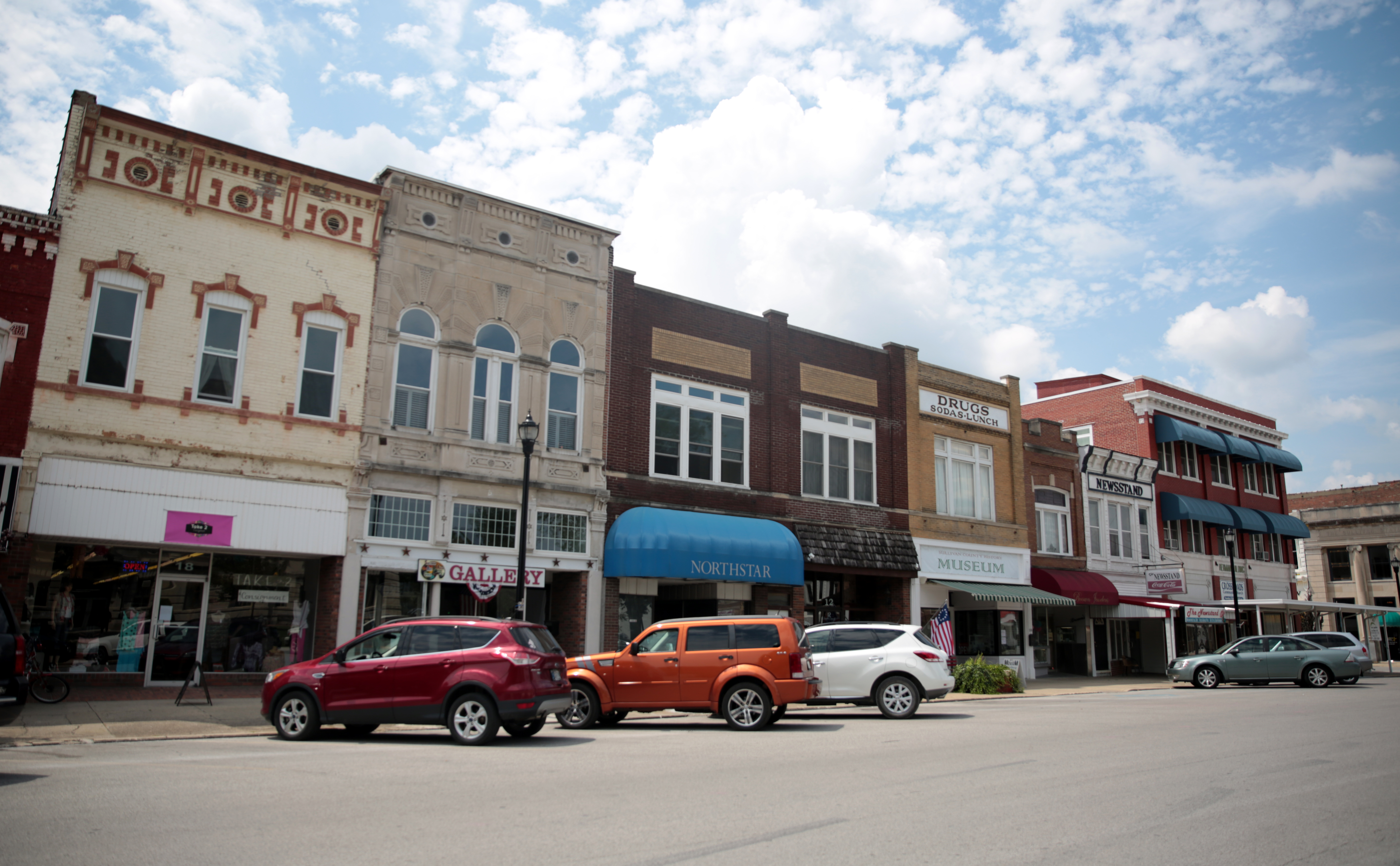
- Downtown Sullivan
- Nickname: Home of the Golden Arrows
- Motto: Take time to care
- Location of Sullivan in Sullivan County, Indiana.
- Coordinates: 39°05′43″N 87°24′21″W
- Country: United States
- State: Indiana
- County: Sullivan
- Township: Hamilton

Government
  - Mayor: J.D. Wilson (D)
  - Chief of Police: Scott McCammon
  - Building Commissioner: Brian D. Pound

Area
  - Total: 1.88 sq mi (4.86 km^{2})
  - Land: 1.88 sq mi (4.86 km^{2})
  - Water: 0 sq mi (0.00 km^{2}) 0%
- Elevation: 528 ft (161 m)

Population (2020)
  - Total: 4,264
  - Density: 2,274.3/sq mi (878.13/km^{2})
- Time zone: UTC-5 (EST)
  - Summer (DST): UTC-4 (EDT)
- ZIP codes: 47864, 47882
- Area code: 812
- FIPS code: 18-74006
- GNIS feature ID: 444366
- Website: www.cityofsullivan.org

Sullivan is a city in Hamilton Township and the county seat of Sullivan County, Indiana, United States. As of the 2020 census, Sullivan had a population of 4,264. It is part of the Terre Haute metropolitan area.

== History ==
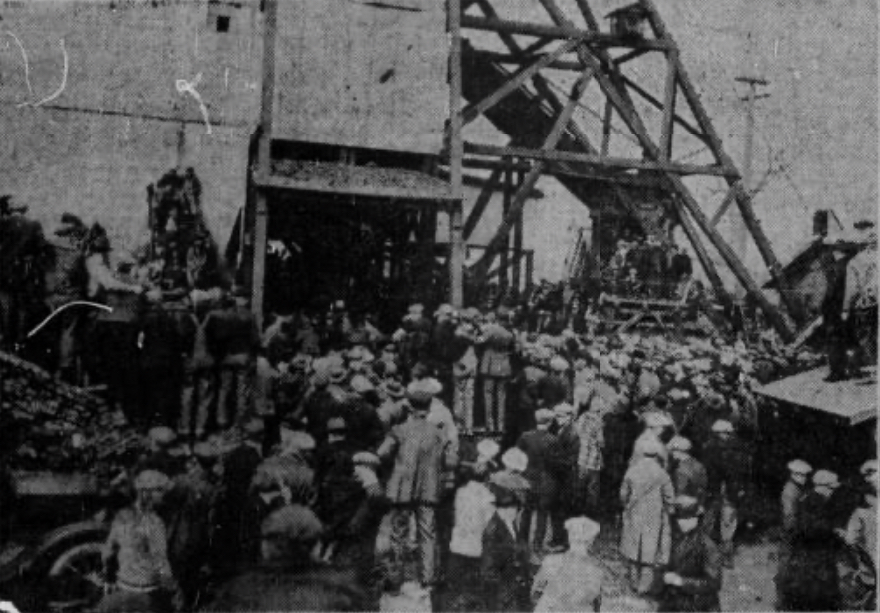
Sullivan Coal Mine Explosion rescue operation, 1925

The Sullivan post office has been in operation since 1843.

On February 25, 1925, a mine in Sullivan exploded, which left 51 of the 122 miners dead. Another coal mine explosion followed in 1937, which killed 20.

=== 2023 tornado ===
On the night of March 31, 2023, Sullivan was struck by a large, powerful and deadly tornado as part of a much larger outbreak, causing catastrophic damage in the city and surrounding parts of the county. At least 3 people were confirmed dead and several others injured, while at least 200 structures sustained some sort of damage. The tornado was rated EF3, containing winds up to 165 mph (250 km/h).

According to the 2010 census, Sullivan has a total area of 1.88 square miles (4.87 km^{2}), all land.

== Demographics ==
Historical population
Census	Pop.	Note	%±
1860	949		—
1870	1,396		47.1%
1880	2,161		54.8%
1890	2,222		2.8%
1900	3,118		40.3%
1910	4,115		32.0%
1920	4,489		9.1%
1930	5,306		18.2%
1940	5,077		−4.3%
1950	5,423		6.8%
1960	4,979		−8.2%
1970	4,683		−5.9%
1980	4,774		1.9%
1990	4,663		−2.3%
2000	4,617		−1.0%
2010	4,249		−8.0%
2020	4,264		0.4%
U.S. Decennial Census

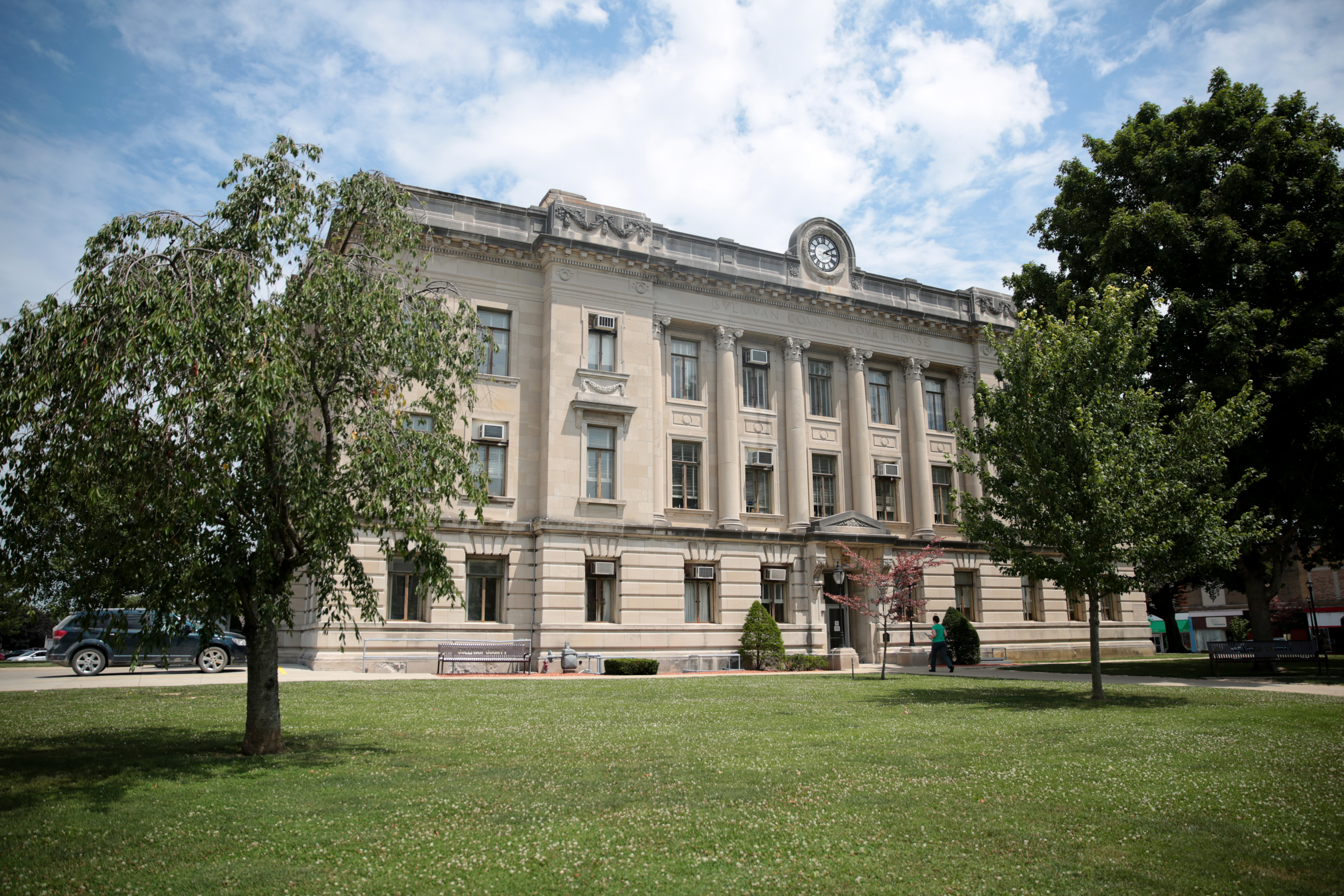
Sullivan County Courthouse is listed on the National Register of Historic Places

=== 2020 census ===
As of the 2020 census, Sullivan had a population of 4,264. The median age was 39.2 years. 22.8% of residents were under the age of 18 and 20.3% of residents were 65 years of age or older. For every 100 females there were 86.8 males, and for every 100 females age 18 and over there were 80.8 males age 18 and over.

99.9% of residents lived in urban areas, while 0.1% lived in rural areas.

There were 1,921 households in Sullivan, of which 28.3% had children under the age of 18 living in them. Of all households, 33.9% were married-couple households, 19.8% were households with a male householder and no spouse or partner present, and 37.6% were households with a female householder and no spouse or partner present. About 40.1% of all households were made up of individuals and 19.3% had someone living alone who was 65 years of age or older.

There were 2,168 housing units, of which 11.4% were vacant. The homeowner vacancy rate was 2.8% and the rental vacancy rate was 9.9%.

Racial composition as of the 2020 census
Race	Number	Percent
White	3,912	91.7%
Black or African American	8	0.2%
American Indian and Alaska Native	15	0.4%
Asian	17	0.4%
Native Hawaiian and Other Pacific Islander	1	0.0%
Some other race	23	0.5%
Two or more races	288	6.8%
Hispanic or Latino (of any race)	70	1.6%

=== 2010 census ===
As of the census of 2010, there were 4,249 people, 1,835 households, and 1,073 families living in the city. The population density was 2,260.1 inhabitants per square mile (872.6/km^{2}). There were 2,110 housing units at an average density of 1,122.3 per square mile (433.3/km^{2}). The racial makeup of the city was 97.7% White, 0.1% African American, 0.4% Native American, 0.2% Asian, 0.4% from other races, and 1.2% from two or more races. Hispanic or Latino of any race were 1.4% of the population.

There were 1,835 households, of which 29.4% had children under the age of 18 living with them, 39.2% were married couples living together, 14.3% had a female householder with no husband present, 5.0% had a male householder with no wife present, and 41.5% were non-families. 37.1% of all households were made up of individuals, and 18.1% had someone living alone who was 65 years of age or older. The average household size was 2.27 and the average family size was 2.96.

The median age in the city was 39.8 years. 23.8% of residents were under the age of 18; 9.3% were between the ages of 18 and 24; 23.4% were from 25 to 44; 25% were from 45 to 64; and 18.5% were 65 years of age or older. The gender makeup of the city was 46.3% male and 53.7% female.

=== 2000 census ===
As of the census of 2000, there were 4,617 people, 1,958 households, and 1,176 families living in the city. The population density was 2,410.1 inhabitants per square mile (930.5/km^{2}). There were 2,264 housing units at an average density of 1,181.8 per square mile (456.3/km^{2}). The racial makeup of the city was 97.92% White, 0.50% African American, 0.37% Native American, 0.24% Asian, 0.13% from other races, and 0.84% from two or more races. Hispanic or Latino of any race were 0.82% of the population.

There were 1,958 households, out of which 28.5% had children under the age of 18 living with them, 45.0% were married couples living together, 11.6% had a female householder with no husband present, and 39.9% were non-families. 36.0% of all households were made up of individuals, and 19.9% had someone living alone who was 65 years of age or older. The average household size was 2.26 and the average family size was 2.95.

In the city, the population was spread out, with 23.5% under the age of 18, 8.9% from 18 to 24, 25.5% from 25 to 44, 22.0% from 45 to 64, and 20.2% who were 65 years of age or older. The median age was 39 years. For every 100 females, there were 83.9 males. For every 100 females age 18 and over, there were 77.5 males.

The median income for a household in the city was $26,115, and the median income for a family was $35,042. Males had a median income of $28,773 versus $21,992 for females. The per capita income for the city was $17,717. About 13.6% of families and 16.6% of the population were below the poverty line, including 22.2% of those under age 18 and 11.0% of those age 65 or over.

== Education ==
The town is served by the Southwest School Corporation, and students go to Sullivan High School.

Sullivan has a public library, a branch of the Sullivan County Public Library.

=== High school ===
Sullivan High School
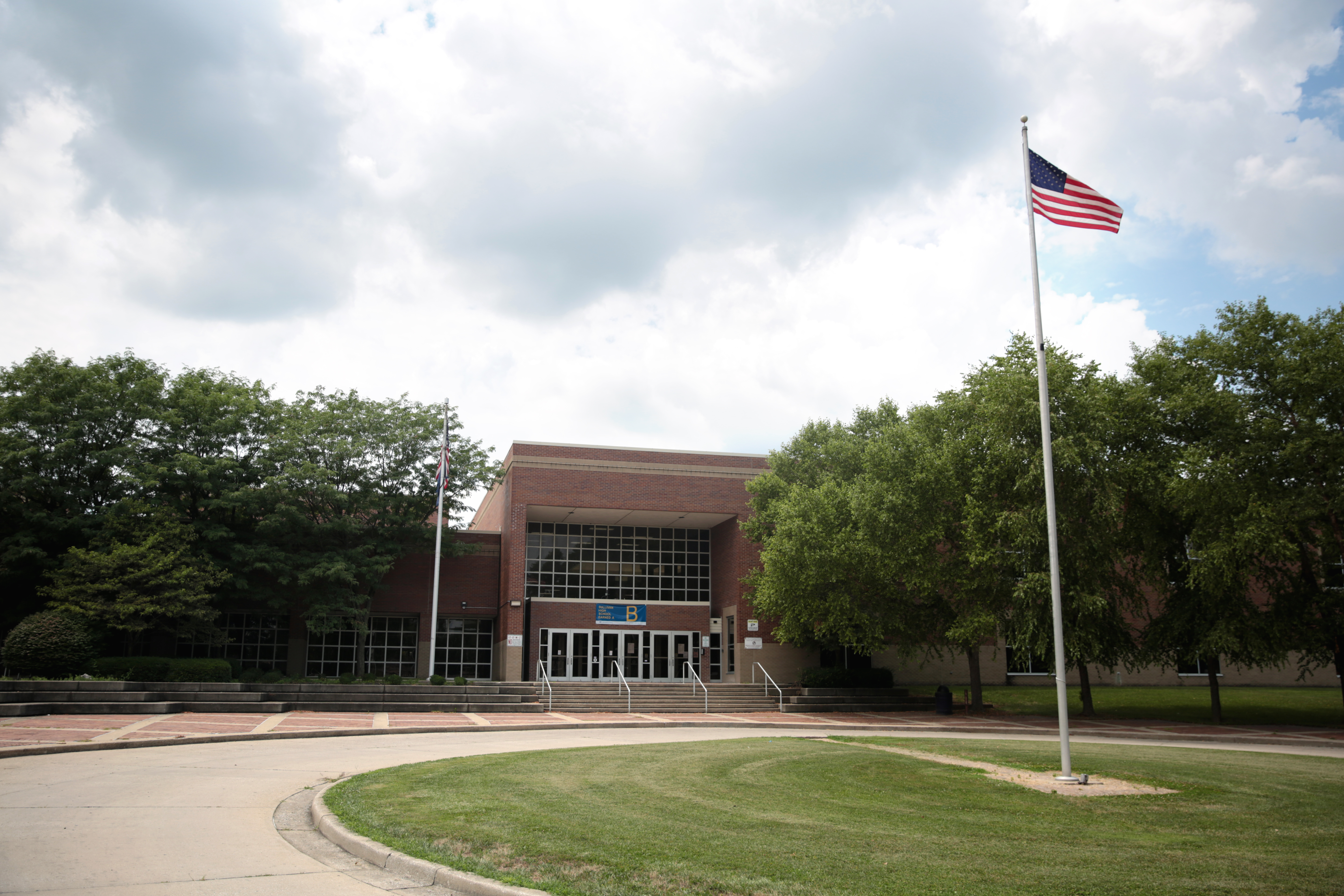

Location
- 902 North Section Street; 39.1053°N 87.4114°W

Information
- Established: 1883
- School district: Southwest School Corporation
- Principal: Monty Kirk
- Faculty: 42.33 (FTE)
- Grades: 9-12
- Enrollment: 503 (2023-24)
- Student to teacher ratio: 11.88
- Color
- Athletics conference: Western Indiana Conference
- Team name: Golden Arrows
- Rivals: Linton Miners, West Vigo Vikings, North Central Thunderbirds, Northview Knights
- Newspaper: Arrow Life
- Yearbook: The Arrow
- Website: Sullivan High School

Sullivan High School is a public high school located in ZIP Code 47882, Sullivan, Indiana. SHS is one of three high schools in Sullivan County (the other two being North Central High School in Farmersburg and Union High School in Dugger). Sullivan High School is also the only secondary institution under the administration of the Southwest School Corporation.

==== School history ====
In 1964, the school made national headlines after a student was fatally struck by wood from a lathe in during a woodworking class.

==== School demographics ====
The school's racial makeup is 95% Caucasian with 473 students, 3% Hispanic with 14 students, and 2% Multiracial with 8 students. 39% of students are eligible for free lunch, and 7% are eligible for reduced-price lunch.

==== Athletics ====
An athletic field at the school was first built around 1928.

Sullivan High School offers Baseball, Softball, Boys Basketball, Girls Basketball, Cheerleading, Boys Cross Country, Girls Cross Country, Football, Golf, Soccer, Boys Track, Girls Track, Volleyball, and Wrestling.

== Notable people ==
- Will H. Hays (1879–1954) - Chairman of the Republican National Committee (1918–21), Postmaster General of the United States (1921–22), President of the Motion Picture Producers and Distributors of America (1922–45) and namesake of the movie industry's Hays Code.
- Nelson Poynter (1903–1978) - Newspaperman and founder of the Poynter Institute.
- Antoinette Dakin Leach (April 3, 1859 – June 11, 1922) was an American lawyer and a women's rights pioneer who was an active organizer on behalf of women's suffrage in Indiana.
- Paul Dresser (1857–1906) - Late 19th century singer, songwriter and comedic actor. Wrote one of the best-selling songs of the 19th century, "On the Banks of the Wabash, Far Away".
