= Sullivan County Public Library =

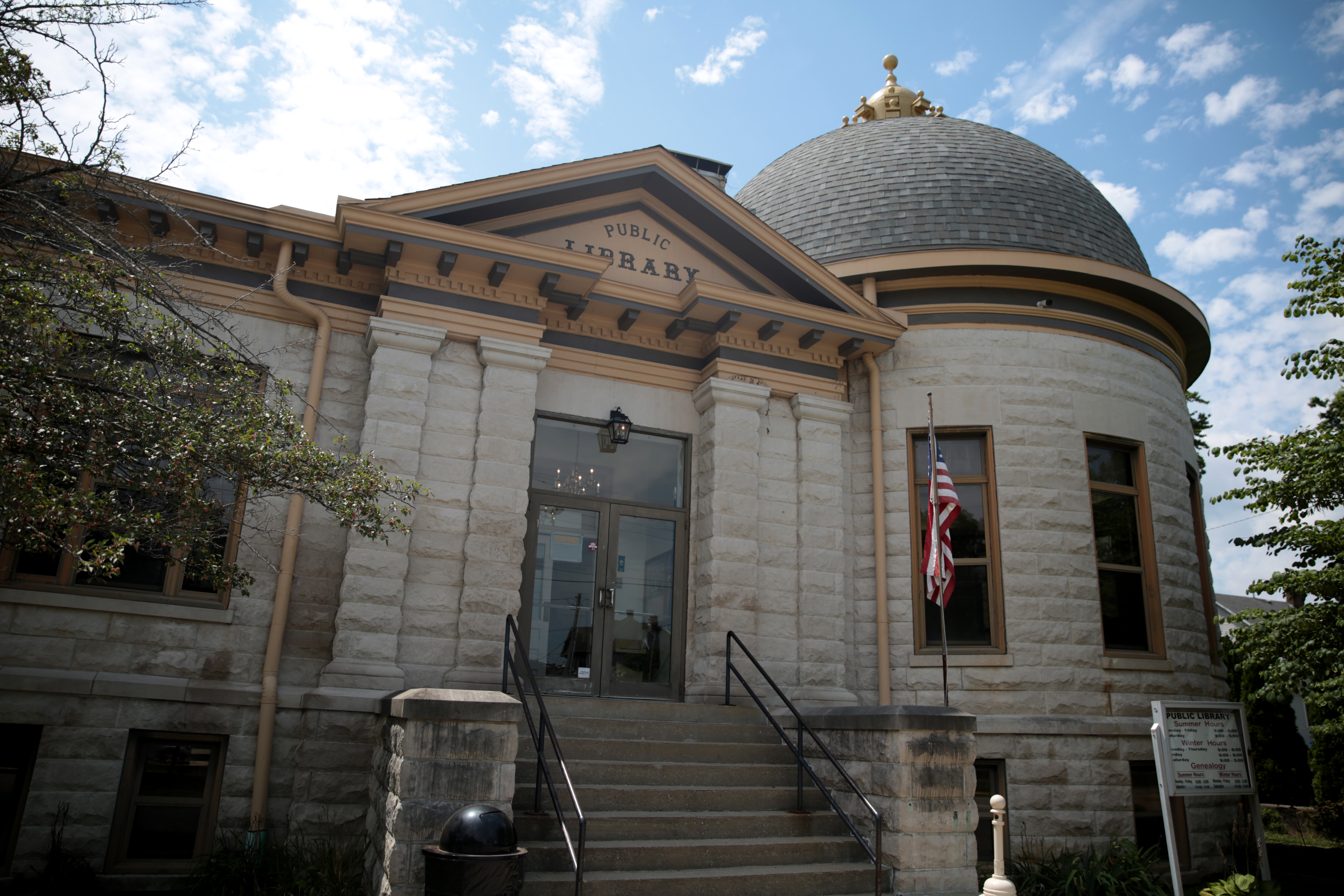
- Sullivan County Public Library
- 39.0953°N 87.4058°W
- Location: Sullivan, Indiana, United States
- Type: Public library
- Established: 1905
- Branches: 4 (Carlisle, Indiana, Dugger, Indiana, Farmersburg, Indiana, Merom, Indiana)

Other information
- Director: April Cox
- Website: www.sullivan.lib.in.us

The Sullivan County Public Library serves residents of Sullivan and Sullivan County, Indiana. A public library, it has been in operation since 1905. In 1899, the "Woman's Club" began a drive to establish a Carnegie library in the city of Sullivan, Indiana. It was officially completed in January 1905, with a cost of $10,000, and was then open to the public. It is a two-story, Bedford limestone structure, complete with a dome. There have been several different changes to the library throughout the years, which has included a new addition to the structure in 1994, which also included an elevator. In the late 1960s and the early 1970s, the Merom, Farmersburg, Dugger, and Carlisle libraries merged with the Sullivan Library, and became a part of the Sullivan County Public Library system.

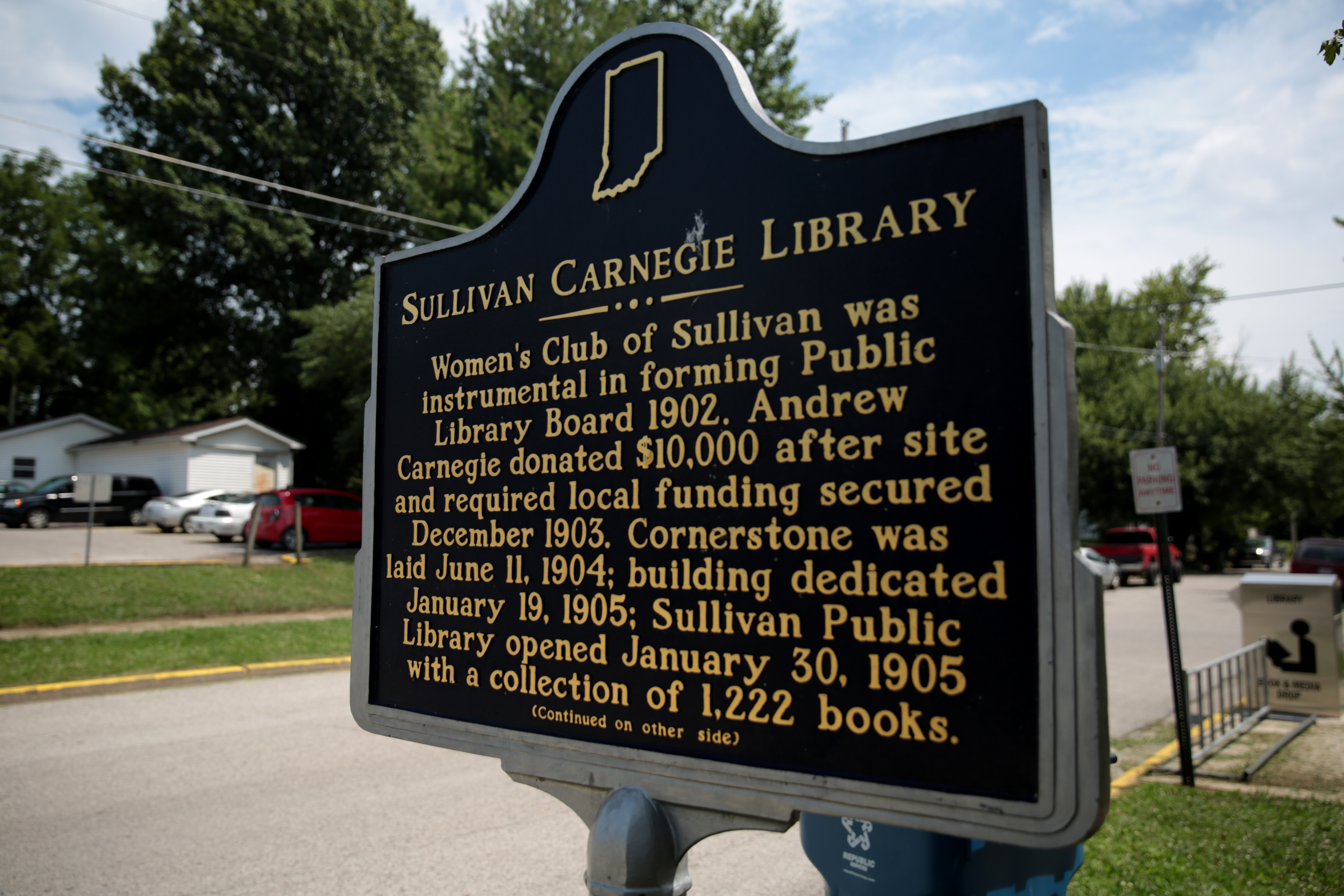
Sullivan Carnegie Library sign

Outreach areas include the Hymera Community Library, Sullivan Housing Authority, and the Sullivan County Community Hospital.

Library cards are free to those who live or own property in Sullivan County. In addition to standard public library services, the library offers video rental, downloadable audiobooks, eBooks, music, and magazines.
