= Eastern Greene High School =

Location
- 11064 E. St Rd 54; Bloomfield, Greene County, Indiana 47424; United States; 39.043286°N 86.744476°W

Information
- Type: Public high school
- Established: 1960
- School district: Eastern School District of Greene County
- Superintendent: Doug Lewis (Middle School)
- Principal: Eric Kirkendall (High School); Alissa Clary (Middle School)
- Teaching staff: 28.83 (FTE)
- Grades: 9–12
- Enrollment: 351 (2023–2024)
- Student to teacher ratio: 12.17
- Color
- Fight song: Notre Dame Victory March
- Athletics conference: SWIAC; Southwest Seven Football Conference
- Team name: Thunderbirds
- Rivals: Bloomfield Cardinals, North Central (Farmersburg)
- Newspaper: The Thunderbolt
- Yearbook: Spirit
- Website: Official Website

Eastern Greene High School is a high school in the eastern part of Greene County, Indiana, United States. Even though it is addressed to Bloomfield, the school is 12.5 miles away, among several communities that are much closer like Cincinnati, Owensburg, Solsberry and Hobbieville.

== Notable alumni ==
- BJ Yoho - Charity worker, Filmmaker
- Dusty May – Head coach, Dallas Mavericks; former men's basketball coach, University of Michigan
- Mike Burris - Assistant Men's Basketball Coach, Indiana University - Indianapolis

== See also ==
- List of high schools in Indiana
