= North Daviess Junior-Senior High School =

Location
- 5494 East SR 58; Elnora, Daviess County, Indiana 47529; United States; 38.847436°N 87.062008°W

Information
- Type: Public high school
- School district: North Daviess Community Schools
- Principal: Jed Jerrels
- Teaching staff: 35.00 (on an FTE basis)
- Grades: 7–12
- Enrollment: 457 (2023–2024)
- Student to teacher ratio: 13.06
- Color
- Team name: Cougars
- Website: www.jshs.ndaviess.k12.in.us

North Daviess Junior-Senior High School is a high school located near Elnora, Indiana, United States. Its athletic nickname is the "Cougars," and it participates in the Southwestern Indiana Conference. In the 2008–2009 ISTEP ranking, North Daviess placed 60th in the state. It was established in 1968 as a consolidation of the Elnora Owls, Odon Bulldogs, Raglesville Rockets, Plainville Midgets, and the Epsom Salts.

== Sports ==
North Daviess competes in the smallest level in the Indiana High School Athletic Association, 1A. North Daviess has won a state title in boys' basketball, semi-state in softball and girls' golf, and regionals in softball, boys' basketball, girls' basketball, girls' golf, cross country, track, and baseball.

Because of the IHSAA's Tournament Success rule, North Daviess currently competes in class 2A in volleyball and girls' basketball, and in 3A in boys' basketball. This is because of the aforementioned state titles and repeated appearances at state, all in recent years.

== See also ==
- List of high schools in Indiana
- Southwestern Indiana Conference
- Elnora, Indiana
