= Owen Valley High School =

Location
- 622 West SR 46; Spencer, Owen County, Indiana 47460; United States; 39.288618°N 86.781596°W

Information
- Type: Public high school
- Motto: "Where Every Student Will Learn, Succeed and Achieve."
- Established: 1971
- School district: Spencer-Owen Community Schools
- Principal: Robert Boltinghouse
- Teaching staff: 51.00 (FTE)
- Grades: 9-12
- Enrollment: 650 (2023–2024)
- Student to teacher ratio: 12.75
- Color
- Athletics conference: Western Indiana Conference
- Team name: Patriots
- Rivals: Edgewood High School (Indiana)
- Yearbook: Triad
- Website: ovhs.socs.k12.in.us

Owen Valley High School (OVHS) is a public high school located in Spencer, Indiana, United States.

== History ==
Built in 1971, OVHS is the result of a consolidation of several smaller schools located within Owen County. The three schools that were merged to make Owen Valley High School are Patricksburg High School, Spencer High School, and Gosport High School. The merger of these highschools is the namesake of the school paper. Additionally, those former high schools are now elementary schools.

In the fall of 2003, ground was broken on the renovation and additions that have been made to the OVHS. The class of 2003 was the last to graduate from the original 1971 building. The gift from the senior class in 2003 was a cornerstone made of limestone from the Bybee Bros. Stone Quarry in Ellettsville, Indiana for the new addition; this cornerstone can be viewed from the front of the building. The Cornerstone was written by graduating Class Secretary Thomas Barnett. It reads as follows: "Dedicated to honor those who educate students for future generations."

== Athletics ==
Owen Valley's mascot is the Patriot, and the school's colors are red, white and blue.

== See also ==
- List of high schools in Indiana
- Western Indiana Conference
- Spencer, Indiana
