= North Central High School (Farmersburg, Indiana) =

North Central Jr./Sr. High School

Location
- 910 E. Co. Rd. 975 N. Farmersburg, Sullivan County, Indiana 47850; United States
- 39.225087°N 87.390451°W

Information
- Type: Public high school
- Motto: "We are one."
- Established: 1957–1958
- Locale: Small Town
- School district: Northeast School Corporation
- Dean: Travis Nolting
- Principal: Nancy Liston
- Teaching staff: 27.00 (FTE)
- Grades: 9-12
- Enrollment: 376 (2023–2024)
- Student to teacher ratio: 13.93
- Color
- Athletics conference: Southwestern Indiana Conference
- Mascot: Thunderbirds
- Website: North Central High School

== Background ==
North Central Jr/Sr high school is located south of Farmersburg, Indiana on US Highway 41. If you are looking for it, it can be found just across from the Brampton Brick factory and just south of the WTWO News Channel TWO station. The school celebrated its 50th year of service in 2007–08. It is currently the only high school and one of 4 schools in the Northeast school corporation of Sullivan County.

North Central's mascot is the Thunderbirds, named for all the explosions that came from the old Thunderbird Mine, that operated nearby Farmersburg and Shelburn, Indiana at the time of the start of the school.

== Athletics ==
North Central is a Class A school with Indiana High School Athletic Association (IHSAA) membership. The school was formerly a member of the Tri-River Conference until it disbanded in 2010. The school's athletic programs now participate as a member of the Southwestern Indiana Conference.

North Central (Farmersburg) Athletics
Sport	Coach	Season	Record
Boys Football	Coach Travis Nolting	Fall	42–21
Girls Golf		Fall	Unknown
Boys Tennis		Fall	Unknown
Girls Volleyball		Fall	
Coed Cross Country	Jeff Ransford	Fall	Unknown
Boys Basketball	Mr. Pherson	Winter	
Girls Basketball	Joey Davidson	Winter	
Boys Golf	Aaron Greve	Spring	Unknown
Boys Baseball	Joe Kutch	Spring	3–8
Girls Softball	Erica Arnold	Spring	Unknown
Coed Track	Jamie Huff	Spring	Unknown

== Statistics ==
These are some statistics of the school as off of the Indiana Department of Education website

=== Student migration ===
- 2006–07 to 2007–08
- Farmersburg Elementary School 41 Pupils
- Shelburn Elementary School 28 Pupils
- Hymera Elementary School 17 Pupils
- Honey Creek Middle School 5 Pupils

=== Ethnicity ===
- 2007–08
- 96.7% White 502 Pupils
- 1.7% Multi-Racial 9 Pupils
- 0.8% Hispanic 4 Pupils
- 0.6% Native American 3 Pupils
- 0.2% Asian 1 Pupil
- 0.4% Black 2 Pupils

=== Free lunch ===
- 2007–08
- Paid Lunch 52.2% 271 Pupils
- Reduced Lunch 14.8% 77 Pupils
- Free Lunch 32.9% 171 Pupils

=== Attendance rate ===
- Preliminary Data 2007–08
- State Average 95.9%
- Total 95.1%
- Male 95.2%
- Female 95.0%
- Multi-Racial 95.2%
- White 95.2%

=== ISTEP results ===
- 2008–09 Fall

==== English/LA ====
- 7th Grade – 77 Pupils Tested,0% Pass Plus 0 Pupils, 49% Passed 38 Pupils, 51% Failed 39 Pupils
- 8th Grade – 100 Pupils Tested, 10% Pass Plus 10 Pupils, 53% Passed 53 Pupils, 36% Failed 36 Pupils, 1% Undetermined 1 Pupil
- 9th Grade – Not Tested In Fall Of 2008
- 10th Grade – 89 Pupils Tested, 0% Pass Plus 0 Pupils, 62% Passed 55 Pupils, 36% Failed 32 Pupils, 2% Undetermined 2 Pupils

==== Mathematics ====
- 7th Grade – 77 Pupils Tested, 10% Pass Plus 8 Pupils, 68% Passed 52 Pupils, 21% Failed 16 Pupils, 1% Undetermined 1 Pupil
- 8th Grade – 100 Pupils Tested, 12% Pass Plus 12 Pupils, 53% Passed 53 Pupils, 35% Failed 35 Pupils,
- 9th Grade – Not Tested In Fall Of 2008
- 10th Grade – 89 Pupils Tested, 2% Pass Plus 2 Pupils, 54% Passed 48 Pupils, 44% Failed 39 Pupils,

==== SAT ====
- 2007–08
- 40% of Seniors Taking

===== Average scores =====
- Writing 473
- Mathematics 494
- Critical Reading 470
- Composite Score College-Bound Seniors(Verbal & Math) 964

==== Graduation rate ====
- 2006–07
- 87.5% of Pupils
- 63 Pupils
- 28.6% Honors Grads 18 Pupils
- 34.9% Core 40 Only 22 Pupils
- 36.5% Regular Grads 23 Pupils
- 73% Pursuing College Education 46 Pupils

===== Other =====
- 2006–07 or 2007–08
- 7% Taking An Advanced Placement Test
- 10% Of Seniors Taking An ACT Exam
- 23.6 ACT Composite Score

== See also ==
- List of high schools in Indiana
