= Shakamak Junior-Senior High School =

Location
- 9233 Shakamak School Road; Jasonville, Greene County, Indiana 47438; United States; 39.159578°N 87.212342°W

Information
- Type: Public high school
- School district: Metropolitan School District of Shakamak
- Principal: Shane Reese
- Teaching staff: 29.00 (FTE)
- Grades: 7–12
- Enrollment: 306 (2023–2024)
- Student to teacher ratio: 10.55
- Color
- Team name: Lakers
- Website: www.shakamak.k12.in.us/page/jrsr-high

Shakamak Junior-Senior High School is a middle school and high school located in Jasonville, Indiana, United States.

== See also ==
- List of high schools in Indiana
