= Linton-Stockton High School =

Location
- 10 H Street Northeast; Linton, Greene County, Indiana 47441; United States; 39.041586°N 87.166364°W

Information
- Type: Public high school
- School district: Linton-Stockton School Corporation
- Principal: Alicia Cornelius
- Faculty: 30.00 (FTE)
- Grades: 9-12
- Enrollment: 391 (2018-19)
- Student to teacher ratio: 13.03
- Color
- Team name: Miners
- Website: Official website

Linton-Stockton High School is located in Linton, Indiana in Greene County.

== About ==
The enrollment is more than three hundred.

== Athletics ==
The mascot for this school is the Miner, and the school colors are red and blue. Linton-Stockton High School is currently a member of the Southwestern Indiana Athletic Conference. The Linton-Stockton football team has won 14 sectional championships, 10 regionals, two semi-states and one state title in 2016 – all in Class A through the 2020–21 school year.

== Notable alumni ==
- Dorothy Mengering - television personality, author and late mother of humorist David Letterman

== See also ==
- List of high schools in Indiana
