= Dugger, Indiana =

- Town
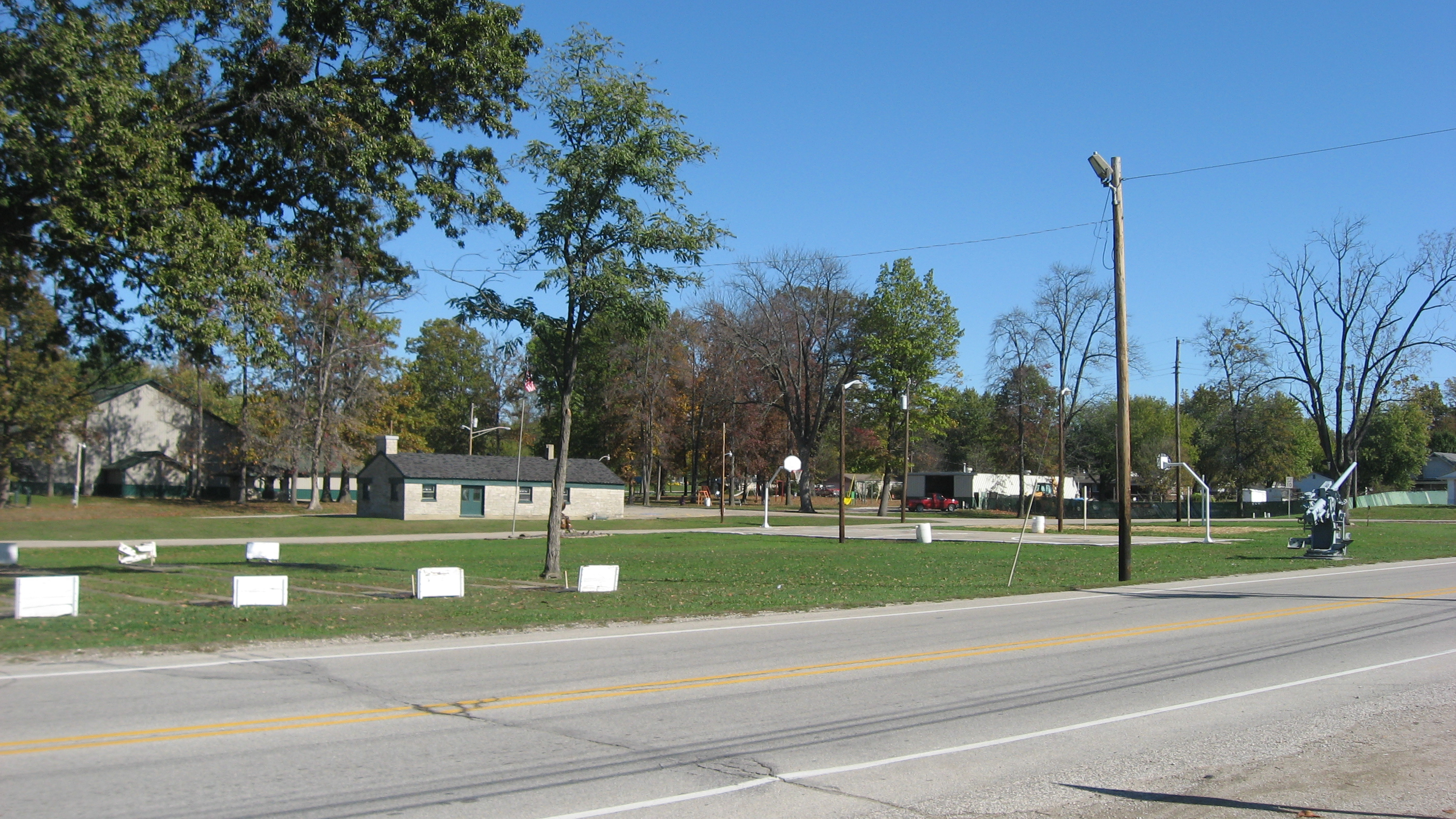
- Dugger's community park

- Location of Dugger in Sullivan County, Indiana.
- Coordinates: 39°4′15″N 87°15′36″W
- Country: United States
- State: Indiana
- County: Sullivan
- Township: Cass

Area
  - Total: 0.59 sq mi (1.52 km^{2})
  - Land: 0.59 sq mi (1.52 km^{2})
  - Water: 0 sq mi (0.00 km^{2})
- Elevation: 577 ft (176 m)

Population (2020)
  - Total: 797
  - Density: 1,360.6/sq mi (525.32/km^{2})
- Time zone: UTC-5 (EST)
  - Summer (DST): UTC-5 (EST)
- ZIP code: 47848
- Area code: 812
- FIPS code: 18-18892
- GNIS feature ID: 447635
- Website: www.townofdugger.org

Dugger is a town in Cass Township, Sullivan County, Indiana, United States. The population was 797 at the 2020 census. It is part of the Terre Haute Metropolitan Statistical Area.

== History ==
Dugger was settled in 1879, and was named after its founder, F.M. Dugger. The Dugger post office has been in operation since 1881.

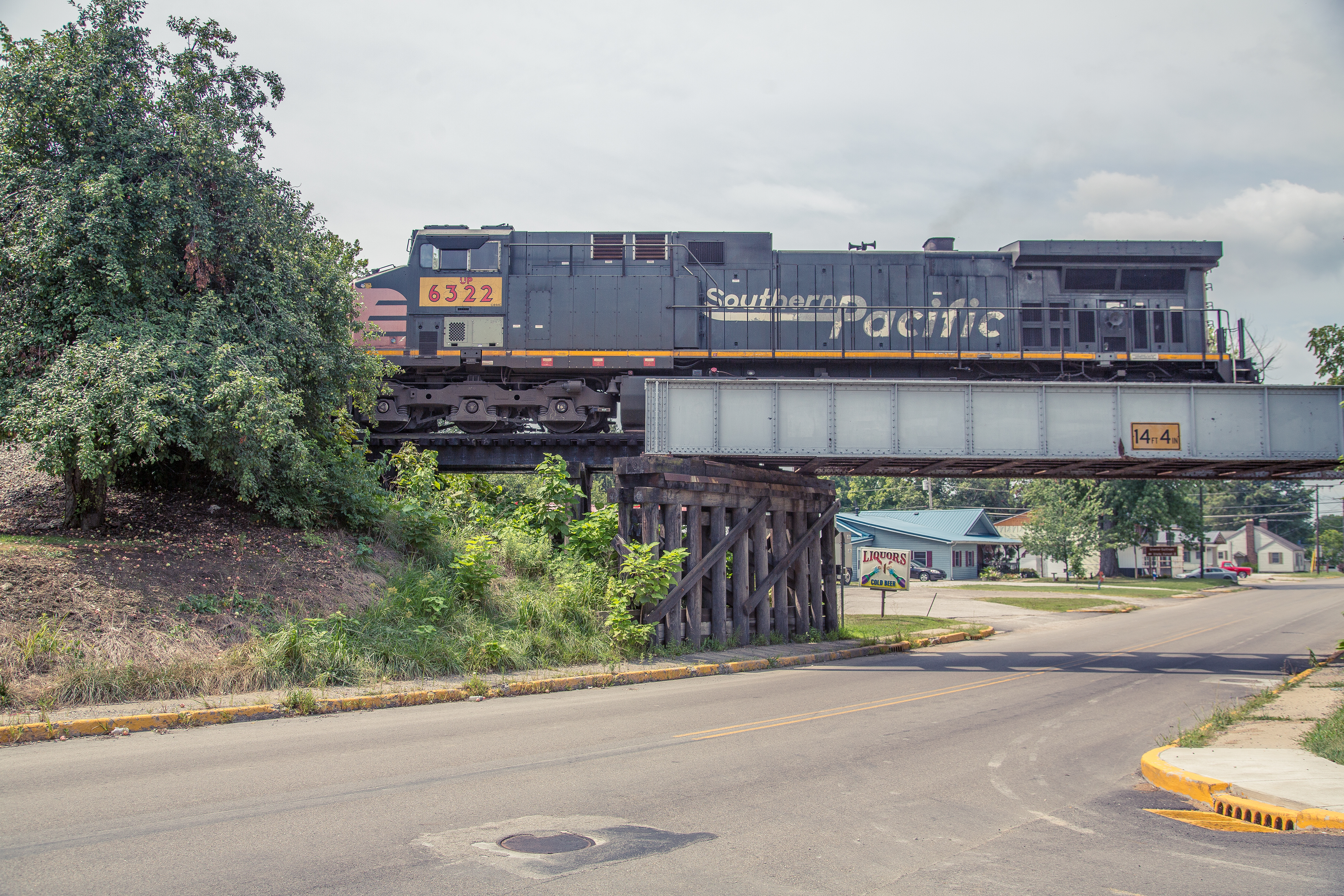
Photo from Small Town Indiana photo survey.

== Geography ==
Dugger is located at 39°4′15″N 87°15′36″W (39.070911, -87.260116).

According to the 2010 census, Dugger has a total area of 0.59 square miles (1.53 km^{2}), all land.

== Demographics ==
Historical population
Census	Pop.	Note	%±
1910	1,226		—
1920	1,679		36.9%
1930	1,383		−17.6%
1940	1,406		1.7%
1950	1,204		−14.4%
1960	1,062		−11.8%
1970	1,150		8.3%
1980	1,118		−2.8%
1990	936		−16.3%
2000	955		2.0%
2010	920		−3.7%
2020	797		−13.4%
U.S. Decennial Census

=== 2010 census ===
As of the census of 2010, there were 920 people, 383 households, and 249 families living in the town. The population density was 1,559.3 inhabitants per square mile (602.0/km^{2}). There were 439 housing units at an average density of 744.1 per square mile (287.3/km^{2}). The racial makeup of the town was 99.7% White and 0.3% from two or more races. Hispanic or Latino of any race were 0.4% of the population.

There were 383 households, of which 32.9% had children under the age of 18 living with them, 47.0% were married couples living together, 13.1% had a female householder with no husband present, 5.0% had a male householder with no wife present, and 35.0% were non-families. 30.0% of all households were made up of individuals, and 13.8% had someone living alone who was 65 years of age or older. The average household size was 2.40 and the average family size was 3.00.

The median age in the town was 38.8 years. 24.3% of residents were under the age of 18; 9.1% were between the ages of 18 and 24; 24.5% were from 25 to 44; 24.7% were from 45 to 64; and 17.5% were 65 years of age or older. The gender makeup of the town was 49.2% male and 50.8% female.

=== 2000 census ===
As of the census of 2000, there were 955 people, 397 households, and 271 families living in the town. The population density was 1,641.1 inhabitants per square mile (633.6/km^{2}). There were 445 housing units at an average density of 764.7 per square mile (295.3/km^{2}). The racial makeup of the town was 98.85% White, 0.21% Native American, 0.31% from other races, and 0.63% from two or more races. Hispanic or Latino of any race were 0.84% of the population.

There were 397 households, out of which 29.5% had children under the age of 18 living with them, 54.7% were married couples living together, 10.8% had a female householder with no husband present, and 31.7% were non-families. 28.0% of all households were made up of individuals, and 19.4% had someone living alone who was 65 years of age or older. The average household size was 2.41 and the average family size was 2.94.

In the town, the population was spread out, with 22.9% under the age of 18, 9.5% from 18 to 24, 26.2% from 25 to 44, 24.0% from 45 to 64, and 17.4% who were 65 years of age or older. The median age was 38 years. For every 100 females, there were 97.7 males. For every 100 females age 18 and over, there were 92.2 males.

The median income for a household in the town was $31,071, and the median income for a family was $39,583. Males had a median income of $27,039 versus $19,000 for females. The per capita income for the town was $15,255. About 4.6% of families and 7.8% of the population were below the poverty line, including 5.8% of those under age 18 and 9.0% of those age 65 or over.

== Education ==
Dugger is also home to Union High School, a small school that was formerly in the Northeast School Corporation of Sullivan County. In December 2013, NESC voted to close Union High School and Dugger Elementary. The school became a charter school and operates as Dugger Union Community Schools.

Dugger has a public library, a branch of the Sullivan County Public Library.

== Arts and culture ==
Dugger is home to the Dugger Coal Museum, which contains local photographs and artifacts related to coal mining in and around Dugger and Sullivan County, Indiana.

Just east of Dugger is the Redbird State Riding Area which is owned and operated by the Indiana Department Of Natural Resources. The Redbird mining operation produced 2 million tons of coal, until Redbird closed operations in 1950. Today the former mining land has been converted into camping and for off-road sports.

The Redbird riding area features 1,200 acres (4.9 km^{2}) of professionally marked, managed and maintained OHV riding trails. Trails range from mild to wild and there is a trail that will fit anyone's skill level. Redbirdsra.com is owned and maintained by the Redbird Foundation.

=== Music and local artists ===
In 2006, Union High School graduate, independent hip-hop/rap/alternative artist/producer BRock Steady (Brock Ward) with over 18,000 subscribers, and former Shawnee Summer Theatre actor was selected as one of 190 students nationwide from an applicant pool of 4,000 to attend the two-year conservatory program at the School for Film and Television (SFT), which is now The New York Conservatory for Dramatic Arts (NYCDA) in Manhattan, New York City.

Dugger is also home to the heavy rock band Philpot, formed by local musicians Kentz Ward, Caleb Smith, Josh Kennedy, Tyler Evans, A.J. Boone, and Arthur Ready. The band performed at regional events including the North 40 Music Festival and Linton Music Festival, distributed their recordings locally through the Philpot and Ward Flower Shop, and signed a recording deal with Public Enemy Records / Sony Entertainment.

== Dead Turbo of Dugger ==
Dugger was home to an abandoned French-built RTG Turboliner formerly used by Amtrak from 1973 to 1981. Found along Indiana State Road 54, the power car (numbered 59) and 2 coaches were nicknamed "The Dead Turbo of Dugger."

It was supposed to be sent for scrap at the Beech Grove Shops in Indianapolis in the early 1990s, but Dugger resident and scrapyard owner Jesse Castle purchased the set to scrap on his property, but for unknown reasons, the set stayed there.

Before being cut up for scrap for unknown reasons in 2023, it sat covered in brush, occasionally visited by railroad history buffs and souvenir hunters. The two coaches (numbered 93 and 95) still sit on their own.

== In the media ==
Dugger is one of the teams that plays against Hickory High in the motion picture Hoosiers.
