= Farmersburg, Indiana =

- Town
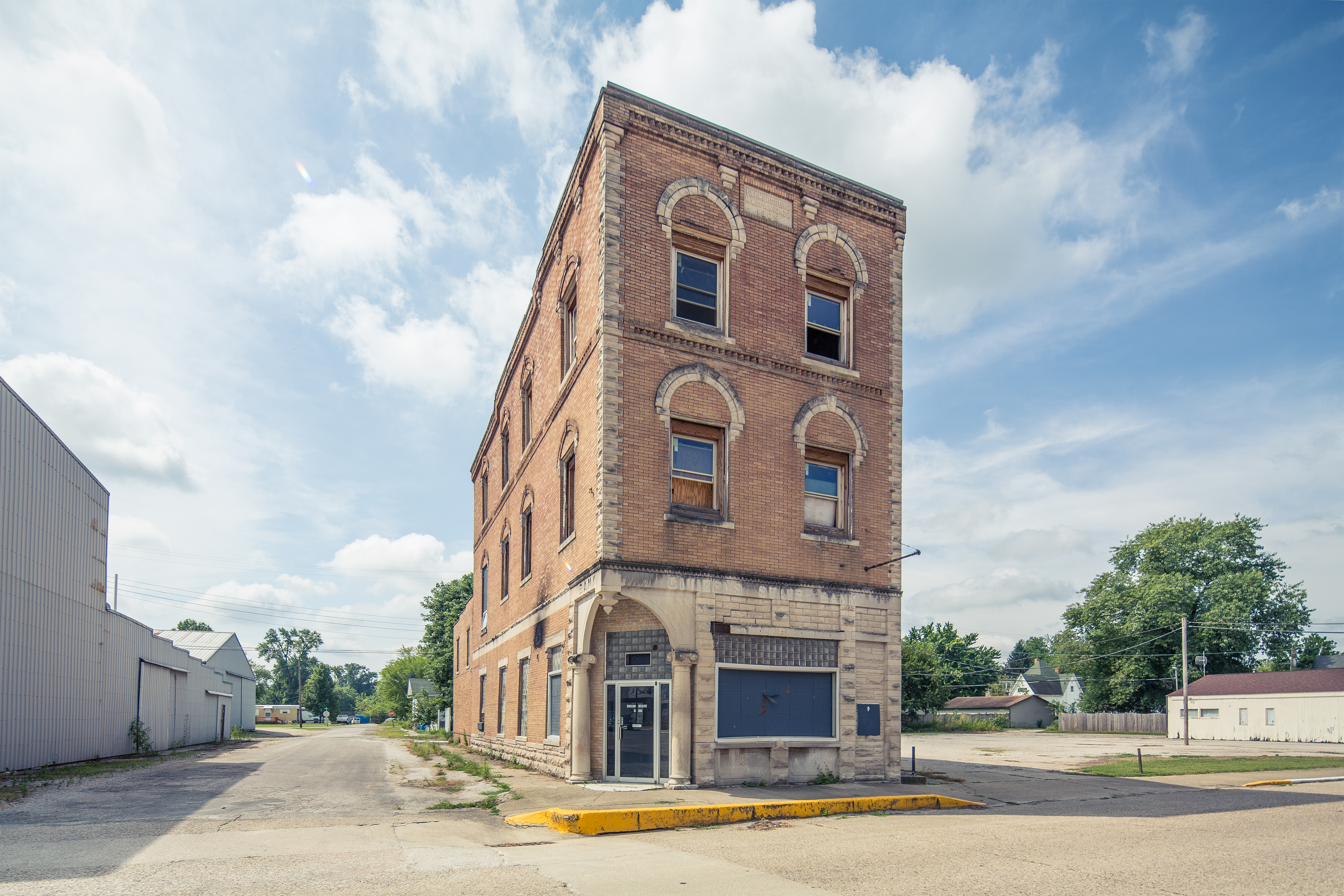

- Location of Farmersburg in Sullivan County, Indiana.
- Coordinates: 39°15′12″N 87°22′53″W
- Country: United States
- State: Indiana
- County: Sullivan
- Township: Curry

Area
  - Total: 0.74 sq mi (1.92 km^{2})
  - Land: 0.74 sq mi (1.92 km^{2})
  - Water: 0 sq mi (0.00 km^{2})
- Elevation: 564 ft (172 m)

Population (2020)
  - Total: 1,069
  - Density: 1,438.8/sq mi (555.53/km^{2})
- Time zone: UTC-5 (EST)
  - Summer (DST): UTC-4 (EDT)
- ZIP code: 47850
- Area code: 812
- FIPS code: 18-22738
- GNIS feature ID: 449655
- Website: www.in.gov/towns/farmersburg/

Farmersburg is a town in Curry Township, Sullivan County, Indiana, United States. As of the 2020 census, Farmersburg had a population of 1,069. It is part of the Terre Haute Metropolitan Statistical Area. The town is adjacent to the Vigo County line and is home to the transmission facilities of Terre Haute's TV stations: WTHI-TV, WTWO, and WAWV-TV. WTWO and WAWV share WTWO's 999-foot tower and both stations' studios and offices also occupy the site. WTHI-TV's tower is 990 feet tall. U.S. Route 41 runs between the two facilities.

== History ==
Farmersburg was founded in 1853 under the name Ascension. A post office was established under this name in 1855, and was renamed to Farmersburg in 1882. The post office is still currently operating.

== Government ==
The Town of Farmersburg lies within Sullivan County, Indiana. Farmersburg is governed by an elected four-member Town Council and Clerk-Treasurer. The Town Council President acts as the "de facto" mayor of the town. Law enforcement in Farmersburg is the priority of the Farmersburg Town Marshal's Office, consisting of the Marshal and his/her deputies. The Marshal is also responsible for all animal and code enforcement. The Marshal is assisted by the Sullivan County Sheriff's Office.

== Geography ==
Farmersburg is located at 39°15′12″N 87°22′53″W (39.253321, -87.381489).

According to the 2010 census, Farmersburg has a total area of 0.74 square miles (1.92 km^{2}), all land.

== Notable people ==
College and professional athletes from Farmersburg include pitcher Connor Strain (University of Evansville and Rancho Cucamonga Quakes), Cole Johnson (RHIT), Adara Crooks (ISU), and pitcher Katelynn Kennedy (SMWC).

== Climate ==
The climate in this area is characterized by hot, humid summers and generally mild to cool winters. According to the Köppen Climate Classification system, Farmersburg has a humid subtropical climate, abbreviated "Cfa" on climate maps.

== Demographics ==
Historical population
| Census | Pop. | Note | %± |
|---|---|---|---|
| 1880 | 237 | | — |
| 1890 | 301 | | 27.0% |
| 1900 | 625 | | 107.6% |
| 1910 | 1,115 | | 78.4% |
| 1920 | 1,141 | | 2.3% |
| 1930 | 993 | | −13.0% |
| 1940 | 1,005 | | 1.2% |
| 1950 | 1,024 | | 1.9% |
| 1960 | 1,027 | | 0.3% |
| 1970 | 962 | | −6.3% |
| 1980 | 1,240 | | 28.9% |
| 1990 | 1,159 | | −6.5% |
| 2000 | 1,180 | | 1.8% |
| 2010 | 1,118 | | −5.3% |
| 2020 | 1,069 | | −4.4% |
U.S. Decennial Census

=== 2020 census ===
As of the 2020 census, Farmersburg had a population of 1,069. The median age was 40.3 years. 23.9% of residents were under the age of 18 and 18.7% of residents were 65 years of age or older. For every 100 females there were 97.6 males, and for every 100 females age 18 and over there were 99.5 males age 18 and over.

0.0% of residents lived in urban areas, while 100.0% lived in rural areas.

There were 439 households in Farmersburg, of which 35.1% had children under the age of 18 living in them. Of all households, 45.8% were married-couple households, 17.8% were households with a male householder and no spouse or partner present, and 28.5% were households with a female householder and no spouse or partner present. About 27.5% of all households were made up of individuals and 14.6% had someone living alone who was 65 years of age or older.

There were 491 housing units, of which 10.6% were vacant. The homeowner vacancy rate was 0.0% and the rental vacancy rate was 7.8%.

Racial composition as of the 2020 census
| Race | Number | Percent |
|---|---|---|
| White | 1,011 | 94.6% |
| Black or African American | 6 | 0.6% |
| American Indian and Alaska Native | 1 | 0.1% |
| Asian | 2 | 0.2% |
| Native Hawaiian and Other Pacific Islander | 1 | 0.1% |
| Some other race | 0 | 0.0% |
| Two or more races | 48 | 4.5% |
| Hispanic or Latino (of any race) | 11 | 1.0% |

=== 2010 census ===
As of the census of 2010, there were 1,118 people, 466 households, and 306 families living in the town. The population density was 1,510.8 inhabitants per square mile (583.3/km^{2}). There were 548 housing units at an average density of 740.5 per square mile (285.9/km^{2}). The racial makeup of the town was 97.9% White, 0.6% African American, 0.4% Native American, 0.3% Asian, 0.1% from other races, and 0.7% from two or more races. Hispanic or Latino of any race were 1.3% of the population.

There were 466 households, of which 32.6% had children under the age of 18 living with them, 44.2% were married couples living together, 14.8% had a female householder with no husband present, 6.7% had a male householder with no wife present, and 34.3% were non-families. 30.0% of all households were made up of individuals, and 10.7% had someone living alone who was 65 years of age or older. The average household size was 2.40 and the average family size was 2.98.

The median age in the town was 38.7 years. 25.1% of residents were under the age of 18; 7.9% were between the ages of 18 and 24; 24.8% were from 25 to 44; 26.6% were from 45 to 64; and 15.7% were 65 years of age or older. The gender makeup of the town was 48.0% male and 52.0% female.

=== 2000 census ===
As of the census of 2000, there were 1,180 people, 479 households, and 340 families living in the town. The population density was 1,626.4 inhabitants per square mile (628.0/km^{2}). There were 538 housing units at an average density of 741.5 per square mile (286.3/km^{2}). The racial makeup of the town was 97.54% White, 0.08% African American, 0.68% Native American, 0.34% Asian, and 1.36% from two or more races. Hispanic or Latino of any race were 0.59% of the population.

There were 479 households, out of which 33.8% had children under the age of 18 living with them, 53.7% were married couples living together, 11.1% had a female householder with no husband present, and 29.0% were non-families. 26.7% of all households were made up of individuals, and 12.5% had someone living alone who was 65 years of age or older. The average household size was 2.44 and the average family size was 2.89.

In the town, the population was spread out, with 26.0% under the age of 18, 7.8% from 18 to 24, 27.5% from 25 to 44, 21.9% from 45 to 64, and 16.8% who were 65 years of age or older. The median age was 37 years. For every 100 females, there were 94.7 males. For every 100 females age 18 and over, there were 84.2 males.

The median income for a household in the town was $30,478, and the median income for a family was $33,854. Males had a median income of $31,719 versus $20,100 for females. The per capita income for the town was $14,873. About 10.3% of families and 11.0% of the population were below the poverty line, including 14.2% of those under age 18 and 8.4% of those age 65 or over.

== Education ==
Farmersburg has a public library, a branch of the Sullivan County Public Library.
