= South Central Conference (Indiana) =

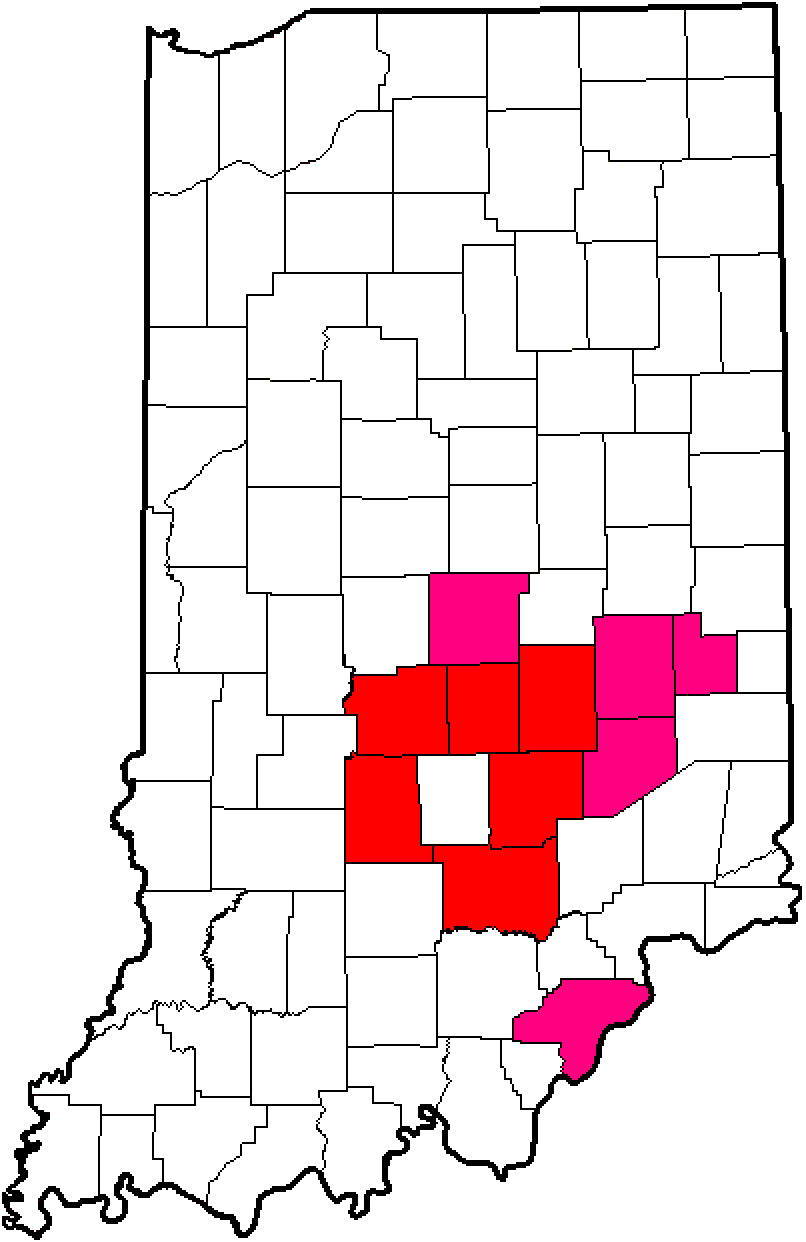
The South Central Conference in Indiana. Counties in red contained schools at the time of disbanding, counties in pink contained former member schools who left before conference folded.

The South Central Conference was an IHSAA-sanctioned conference from 1936 to 1997. The conference began as a collection of schools in mid-sized and large cities in South Central and Southeast Indiana, expanding into both Indianapolis (Washington and Southport) and far Southern Indiana (Jeffersonville). The conference had been as big as 10 in the 1950s, but was down to six schools in the 1980s. With Connersville and Rushville leaving in the advent of class basketball, being replaced by Bloomington North and Center Grove, the conference had shifted to a small conference of large schools. As class basketball was set to be introduced in the 1997-98 school year, the South Central and Central Suburban conferences, as well as large independent schools, decided to reorganize, giving way to Conference Indiana and the Metropolitan Interscholastic Conference.

== Schools ==
School	Location	Mascot	Colors	# / County	Year joined	Previous conference	Year left	Conference joined
Columbus North^{1}	Columbus	Bulldogs		03; Bartholomew	1936	Independents	1997	Indiana
Connersville	Connersville	Spartans		21; Fayette	1936	Independents	1991	Olympic
Franklin^{2}	Franklin	Grizzly Cubs		41; Johnson	1936	Johnson County	1981	Mid-State
Greencastle	Greencastle	Tiger Cubs		67; Putnam	1936	Independents	1949	Western Indiana
Martinsville	Martinsville	Artesians		55; Morgan	1936; 1941	Independents; Independents	1938; 1997	Independents; Indiana
Rushville	Rushville	Lions		70; Rush	1936	Independents	1995	Hoosier Heritage
Shelbyville	Shelbyville	Golden Bears		73; Shelby	1936	Independents	1997	Hoosier Heritage
Greensburg^{3}	Greensburg	Pirates		16; Decatur	1937	Independents	1977	Eastern Indiana
Indianapolis; Washington	Indianapolis	Continentals		49; Marion	1937	Indianapolis	1941	Indianapolis
Seymour^{4}	Seymour	Owls		36; Jackson	1938	Jackson County	1997	Hoosier Hills
Southport	Indianapolis	Cardinals		49; Marion	1951	Independents (MCAA 1945)	1963	Independents (CSC 1995)
Jeffersonville	Jeffersonville	Red Devils		10; Clark	1957	Independents	1981	Hoosier Hills
Bloomington South^{5}	Bloomington	Panthers		53; Monroe	1964	Southern Indiana	1997	Indiana
Center; Grove	Greenwood	Trojans		Johnson	1991	Central Suburban	1996	Metropolitan
Bloomington North	Bloomington	Cougars		53; Monroe	1983	Hoosier Hills	1997	Indiana

1. Was Columbus until 1972.
2. Was Alva Neal High School before 1939.
3. Played concurrently in SCC and EIAC 1974-77.
4. Was Shields High School until 1959.
5. Was Bloomington until 1972.
