= Southern Indiana Athletic Conference =

High School Athletic Conference in Indiana

- Founded: 1936
- No. of teams: 6 Class 4A, 3 Class 3A, and 1 Class 2A
- Region: 4 Counties: Dubois, Knox, Vanderburgh, and Warrick, Indiana

Locations
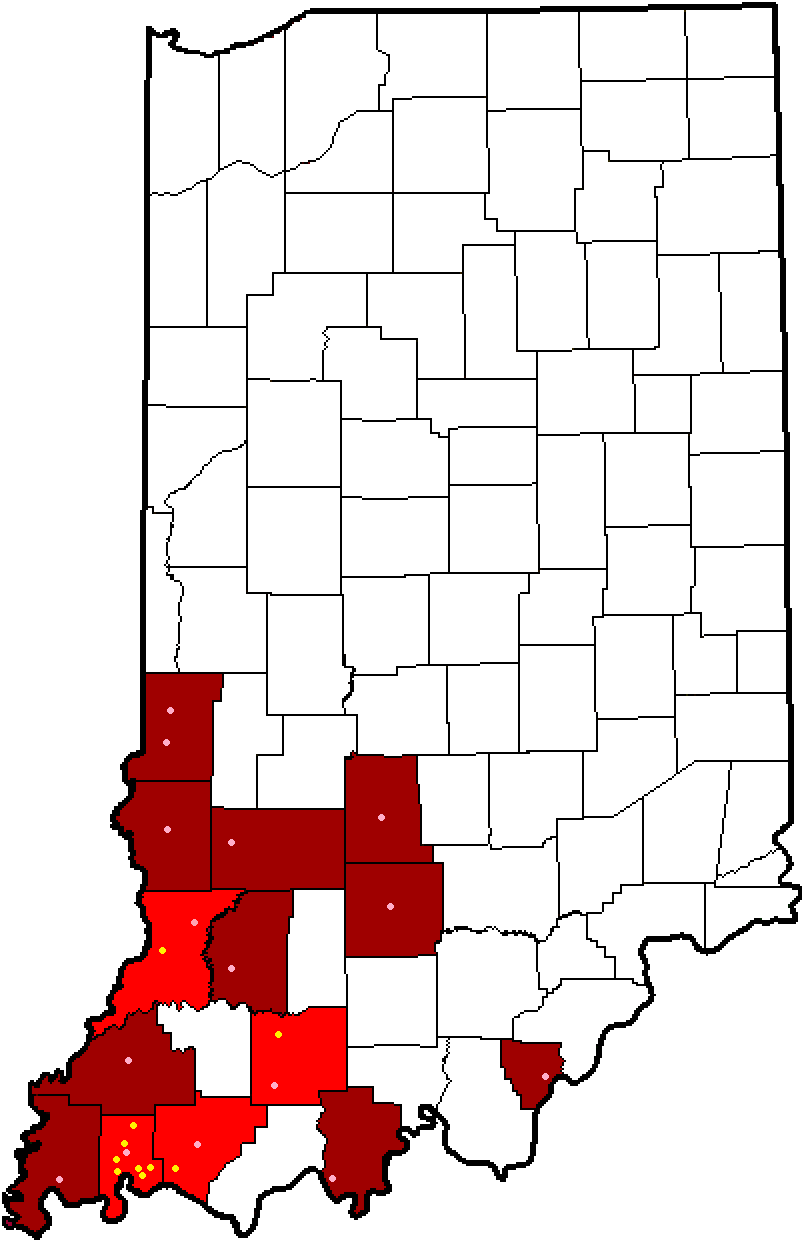
- Current Southern Indiana Athletic Conference Members are in Gold inside Dubois, Knox, Vanderburgh and Warrick Counties. Former members are in pink inside Maroon Counties. The Pink dot in Vanderburgh County is Rex Mundi High School. Other former members in Dubois and Knox Counties are also pink.

The Southern Indiana Athletic Conference (SIAC) is a high school athletic conference based in Evansville, Indiana. Five of the conferences 10 schools; Bosse, Central, Harrison, North, and Reitz; comprise the public Evansville Vanderburgh School Corporation. Mater Dei and Memorial are private Catholic high schools run by the Roman Catholic Diocese of Evansville, and the largest member is Castle, a public school located in neighboring Newburgh in Warrick County under the Warrick County School Corporation. The league was founded in 1936, and at one point stretched far across southern and western Indiana: from Mount Vernon in the west to New Albany in the east, and from Evansville in the south to Terre Haute in the north. Jasper and Vincennes Lincoln announced in May 2019 that they would leave the disbanding Big Eight Conference to rejoin the Southern Indiana Athletic Conference beginning with the 2020–21 season. Vincennes Lincoln announced in January 2025, that it will depart the SIAC for the Western Indiana Conference after the 2025–26 season, citing lack of ability to compete with the Evansville schools, setting off a possible search for a replacement which may involve schools like Heritage Hills and Gibson Southern of the Pocket Athletic Conference

== Member schools ==
| School | School corp. | Mascot | Colors | Location | Enrollment 2018-19 | County (Appx location) | IHSAA Football class | IHSAA Other Sports Class | Year joined | Previous conference |
|---|---|---|---|---|---|---|---|---|---|---|
| John H. Castle | Warrick County | Knights | | Newburgh | 1,945 (1) | 87 Warrick (Southwest) | AAAAA | AAAA | 1964 | Warrick County |
| Evansville; B. Bosse | E.V.S.C. | Bulldogs | | Evansville | 908 (6) | 82 Vanderburgh (South) | AAAA | AAA | 1936 | Independents |
| Evansville; Central | E.V.S.C. | Bears | | Evansville | 938 (4) | 82 Vanderburgh (Central) | AAAA | AAA | 1936 | Independents |
| Evansville; W.H. Harrison | E.V.S.C. | Warriors | | Evansville | 1,154 (3) | 82 Vanderburgh (East) | AAAA | AAAA | 1963 | none (new school) |
| Evansville; Mater Dei | R.C.D. Evansville | Wildcats | | Evansville | 529 (8) | 82 Vanderburgh (West) | AAA | AA | 1954 | none (new school) |
| Evansville; North | E.V.S.C. | Huskies | | Evansville | 1,540 (2) | 82 Vanderburgh (North) | AAAAA | AAAA | 1958 | none (new school) |
| Evansville; F.J. Reitz | E.V.S.C. | Panthers | | Evansville | 1,324 (5) | 82 Vanderburgh (West) | AAAA | AAAA | 1936 | Independents |
| Evansville; Reitz Memorial | R.C.D. Evansville | Tigers | | Evansville | 649 (7) | 82 Vanderburgh (East) | AAA | AAA | 1947 | none (new school) |
| Jasper | Jasper; Consolidated | Wildcats | | Jasper | 1,100 | 19 Dubois (Northwest) | AAAA | AAAA | 2020 | Big Eight |

=== Former members ===
| School | Mascot | Colors | Location | County | Year joined | Previous conference | Year left | Conference joined | Current conference |
|---|---|---|---|---|---|---|---|---|---|
| Bicknell | Bulldogs | | Bicknell | 42; Knox | 1936 | Knox County | 1963 | none (consolidated into North Knox) | Blue Chip (North Knox) |
| Bloomington | Panthers | | Bloomington | 53; Monroe | 1936 | Independents | 1964 | South Central | Conference Indiana (Bloomington South) |
| Linton^{1} | Miners | | Linton | 28; Greene | 1936 | Greene County | 1951 | Western Indiana | SW Indiana; Southwest 7 |
| New Albany | Bulldogs | | New Albany | 22; Floyd | 1936 | Independents | 1977 | Hoosier Hills | Hoosier Hills |
| Princeton | Tigers | | Princeton | 26; Gibson | 1936 | Gibson County | 1980 | Big 8 | Pocket |
| Sullivan^{2} | Golden Arrows | | Sullivan | 77; Sullivan | 1936 | Sullivan County | 1962 | Western Indiana | Western Indiana |
| Vincennes; Lincoln | Alices | | Vincennes | 42; Knox | 1936; 2020 | Independents | 1980; 2026 | Big 8 Western Indiana | Western Indiana |
| Washington | Hatchets | | Washington | 14; Daviess | 1936 | Independents | 1980 | Big 8 | Pocket |
| Boonville | Pioneers | | Boonville | 87; Warrick | 1941 | Pocket/ Warrick County | 1980 | Big 8 | Pocket |
| Bedford | Stonecutters | | Bedford | 47; Lawrence | 1942 | | 1973 | Hoosier Hills | Hoosier Hills (Bedford North Lawrence) |
| Huntingburg | Happy Hunters | | Huntingburg | 19; Dubois | 1942 | Dubois County | 1970 | Pocket | Pocket (Southridge) |
| Jasper | Wildcats | | Jasper | 19; Dubois | 1953 | Dubois County | 1980 | Big 8 | Current; Member |
| Tell City | Marksmen | | Tell City | 62; Perry | 1953 | Pocket | 1980 | Big 8 | Pocket |
| Mount Vernon | Wildcats | | Mount Vernon | 65; Posey | 1959 | Pocket | 1980 | Big 8 | Pocket |
| Evansville; Rex Mundi | Monarchs | | Evansville | 82; Vanderburgh | 1961 | none (new school) | 1972 | none (school closed) | none |
| North Knox | Warriors | | Bicknell | 42; Knox | 1963 | none (new school) | 1968 | Blue Chip | Blue Chip; Southwest 7 |
| Terre Haute North | Patriots | | Terre Haute | 84; Vigo | 1971 | none (new school) | 1982 | Independents | Conference Indiana |
| Terre Haute South | Braves | | Terre Haute | 84; Vigo | 1971 | none (new school) | 1982 | Independents | Conference Indiana |

1. Linton played concurrently in the SIAC and West Central Conference 1944–45, and the SIAC and WIC 1945–51.
2. Sullivan played in both the SIAC and West Central Conference 1944–45, and the SIAC and WIC 1945–62.

== Conference championships ==
=== Football ===
| # | Team | Seasons |
|---|---|---|
| 31 | E. F.J. Reitz | 1942, 1947, 1948 (L), 1949 (L), 1950 (L), 1952, 1953, 1956, 1957, 1960 (A), 1961 (A), 1962 (A), 1967 (A), 1971 (A), 1972 (A), 1976 (3A), 1977 (3A), 1986, 1992, 1996, 2003, 2004*, 2005, 2007, 2008, 2009, 2010, 2016*, 2017*, 2022, 2023 |
| 16 | E. Reitz Memorial | 1958, 1959 (A), 1965 (A), 1969 (A), 1978 (3A), 1985, 1988, 1989, 1990*, 1991*, 2004*, 2017*, 2018, 2019*, 2024, 2025 |
| 11 | E. Central | 1939, 1940, 1941*, 1945*, 1987, 1990*, 2006, 2016*, 2017*, 2019*, 2020 |
| 9 | Tell City | 1961 (B), 1962 (B), 1963 (B), 1964 (B), 1968 (B)*, 1969 (B), 1971 (B), 1972 (B), 1973 (B) |
| 8 | E. Bosse | 1938, 1941*, 1951, 1964, 1979 (3A), 1990*, 1991*, 1994 |
| 8 | E. Mater Dei | 1984*, 1999*, 2000, 2001, 2004*, 2013, 2014, 2015 |
| 8 | Jasper | 1966 (B), 1967 (B), 1970 (B), 1976 (2A), 1977 (2A), 1978 (2A), 1979 (2A), 2021 |
| 7 | Castle | 1975 (2A), 1982, 1983, 1984*, 2002, 2011, 2012 |
| 6 | E. Harrison | 1974 (3A), 1975 (3A), 1993, 1997, 1998, 1999* |
| 3 | Boonville | 1955, 1959 (B), 1974 (2A) |
| 3 | E. North | 1963 (A), 1966 (A), 1995 |
| 3 | Princeton | 1949 (S), 1950 (S), 1960 (B) |
| 3 | T. H. South | 1973 (A), 1980, 1981 |
| 2 | V. Lincoln | 1943, 1946 |
| 2 | New Albany | 1935, 1954 |
| 2 | E. Rex Mundi | 1968 (A), 1970 (A) |
| 2 | Sullivan | 1936, 1937 |
| 1 | Bedford | 1965 (B) |
| 1 | Bicknell | 1948 (S) |
| 1 | Bloomington | 1944 |
| 1 | Linton | 1945* |
| 1 | North Knox | 1968 (B)* |
| 0 | Huntingburg | |
| 0 | Mount Vernon | |
| 0 | T. H. North | |
| 0 | Washington | |

=== Boys basketball ===
| # | Team | Seasons |
|---|---|---|
| 18 | E. Harrison | 1965, 1966, 1967, 1987*, 1989, 1992*, 1993*, 1994*, 1995, 1999, 2001*, 2003, 2009, 2012*, 2013, 2014*, 2023, 2024 |
| 17 | E. Bosse | 1945, 1962, 1981, 1982, 1983, 1984, 1985*, 1986, 1990*, 1996*, 1997, 1998*, 2006, 2007*, 2014*, 2018*, 2020 |
| 13 | E. Central | 1941*, 1946, 1947, 1948, 1950, 1956*, 1957*, 1964, 1979, 1985*, 1991, 1992*, 2004* |
| 11 | E. F.J. Reitz | 1954, 1992*, 2002, 2005*, 2007*, 2014*, 2015, 2016, 2021, 2022, 2025 |
| 7 | Castle | 2001*, 2005, 2010, 2011, 2012*, 2017, 2019 |
| 7 | E. Reitz Memorial | 1987*, 1990*, 1993*, 1994*, 1996*, 2008, 2018* |
| 6 | E. North | 1961, 1971, 1988, 1998*, 2004*, 2026 |
| 5 | Jasper | 1941*, 1943, 1944, 1960, 1970 |
| 5 | Princeton | 1952, 1956*, 1957*, 1975, 1976 |
| 4 | New Albany | 1951, 1955, 1959, 1977 |
| 3 | Huntingburg | 1949, 1953, 1958 |
| 3 | V. Lincoln | 1968, 1969, 1972* |
| 3 | Washington | 1940, 1942, 1978 |
| 2 | E. Mater Dei | 2000, 2001* |
| 1 | Mount Vernon | 1972* |
| 1 | E. Rex Mundi | 1963 |
| 1 | Tell City | 1973 |
| 1 | T.H. North | 1974 |
| 1 | T.H. South | 1980 |
| 0 | Bedford | |
| 0 | Bicknell | |
| 0 | Bloomington | |
| 0 | Boonville | |
| 0 | Linton | |
| 0 | North Knox | |
| 0 | Sullivan | |

=== Boys cross country ===
| # | Team | Seasons |
|---|---|---|
| 14 | Castle | 1985, 1987, 1992, 1993, 1994, 1995, 1998, 2000, 2008, 2016, 2017, 2019, 2020, 2021 |
| 9 | E. F.J. Reitz | 1957, 1958*, 1983, 1984, 1986, 1999, 2018, 2023, 2024 |
| 9 | E. Harrison | 1969, 1970, 1982, 1988, 1989, 1990, 1991, 2014, 2015 |
| 9 | E. North | 1960, 1963, 1996, 1997, 2001, 2007, 2011, 2012, 2013 |
| 8 | Vincennes | 1946, 1948, 1949, 1950, 1951, 1952, 1953, 1954 |
| 7 | T.H. North | 1971, 1972, 1973, 1974, 1976, 1977, 1978 |
| 7 | Bloomington | 1941, 1947, 1955, 1956, 1958*, 1961, 1962 |
| 4 | E. Central | 1979, 1980, 2005, 2006 |
| 3 | E. Reitz Memorial | 2002, 2009, 2010 |
| 3 | E. Mater Dei | 1968, 2003, 2004 |
| 3 | New Albany | 1965, 1966, 1967 |
| 1 | Jasper | 2022 |
| 1 | T.H. South | 1981 |
| 1 | Tell City | 1964 (B), 1975 |
| 1 | E. Bosse | 1964 (A) |
| 1 | Washington | 1959 |
| 0 | Princeton | |
| 0 | Huntingburg | |
| 0 | Mount Vernon | |
| 0 | E. Rex Mundi | |
| 0 | Bedford | |
| 0 | Bicknell | |
| 0 | Boonville | |
| 0 | Linton | |
| 0 | North Knox | |
| 0 | Sullivan | |

=== Wrestling ===
| # | Team | Seasons |
|---|---|---|
| 52 | E. Mater Dei | 1971, 1972, 1973, 1974, 1977, 1978, 1979, 1980, 1981, 1982, 1983, 1984, 1985, 1986, 1987, 1988, 1989, 1990, 1991, 1992, 1993, 1995, 1996, 1997, 1998, 1999, 2000, 2001, 2002, 2003, 2004, 2005, 2006, 2007, 2008, 2009, 2011, 2012, 2013, 2014, 2015, 2016, 2017, 2018, 2019, 2020, 2021, 2022, 2023, 2024, 2025, 2026 |
| 8 | New Albany | 1958, 1959, 1961, 1963, 1965*, 1966, 1967, 1968 |
| 5 | E. F.J. Reitz | 1965*, 1969, 1970, 1976, 2010 |
| 5 | Bloomington | 1956, 1957, 1960, 1962, 1964 |
| 1 | E. Central | 1994 |
| 1 | Jasper | 1975 |
| 0 | E. Harrison | |
| 0 | Castle | |
| 0 | T.H. South | |
| 0 | E. Reitz Memorial | |
| 0 | E. North | |
| 0 | E. Bosse | |
| 0 | Princeton | |
| 0 | Huntingburg | |
| 0 | V. Lincoln | |
| 0 | Washington | |
| 0 | Mount Vernon | |
| 0 | E. Rex Mundi | |
| 0 | Tell City | |
| 0 | T.H. North | |
| 0 | Bedford | |
| 0 | Bicknell | |
| 0 | Boonville | |
| 0 | North Knox | |
| 0 | Sullivan | |

=== Boys soccer ===
| # | Team | Seasons |
|---|---|---|
| 23 | E. Reitz Memorial | 1999, 2000*, 2001, 2002, 2003, 2005, 2006*, 2007, 2008, 2009, 2010*, 2011, 2012, 2013, 2014, 2015, 2017, 2018, 2019, 2020, 2022*, 2025, 2026* |
| 12 | Castle | 1994, 1995, 1996, 1998, 2000*, 2004, 2010*, 2016, 2021, 2023, 2024, 2026* |
| 3 | E. Harrison | 1997, 2006*, 2010* |
| 1 | E. North | 2022* |
| 0 | E. F.J. Reitz | |
| 0 | E. Bosse | |
| 0 | E. Mater Dei | |
| 0 | E. Central | |
| 0 | Jasper | |
| 0 | V. Lincoln | |

=== Boys tennis ===
| # | Team | Seasons |
|---|---|---|
| 26 | E. Reitz Memorial | 1959, 1982, 1986, 1989, 1990, 1991, 1994, 1995, 1996, 1997, 1999, 2000, 2002, 2003, 2004, 2005, 2006, 2010, 2011, 2012, 2013, 2014*, 2015*, 2016, 2017, 2023 |
| 10 | New Albany | 1958, 1960, 1964, 1965, 1966, 1967, 1968, 1972, 1974, 1975 |
| 9 | Castle | 1980, 1987, 1998, 2007, 2008, 2009, 2014*, 2018, 2019 |
| 8 | E. Harrison | 1969, 1971, 1983, 1984, 1985, 1988, 1992, 2001 |
| 6 | T.H. South | 1973, 1976, 1977, 1978, 1979, 1981 |
| 6 | Jasper | 2020, 2021, 2022, 2024, 2025, 2026 |
| 4 | E. North | 1992, 1993, 2014*, 2015* |
| 3 | E. Bosse | 1961, 1962, 1970 |
| 1 | E. F.J. Reitz | 1963 |
| 0 | E. Mater Dei | |
| 0 | E. Central | |
| 0 | Princeton | |
| 0 | Huntingburg | |
| 0 | V. Lincoln | |
| 0 | Washington | |
| 0 | Mount Vernon | |
| 0 | E. Rex Mundi | |
| 0 | Tell City | |
| 0 | T.H. North | |
| 0 | Bedford | |
| 0 | Bicknell | |
| 0 | Bloomington | |
| 0 | Boonville | |
| 0 | North Knox | |
| 0 | Sullivan | |

=== Boys swimming ===
| # | Team | Seasons |
|---|---|---|
| 19 | Castle | 1980, 1981, 2001, 2002, 2003, 2004, 2005, 2006, 2007, 2008, 2009, 2010, 2011, 2012, 2013, 2015, 2016, 2017, 2022 |
| 4 | E. Reitz Memorial | 2014, 2018, 2019, 2020 |
| 2 | E. North | 2023, 2024 |
| 2 | Jasper | 2021, 2026 |
| 0 | E. F.J. Reitz | |
| 0 | E. Central | |
| 0 | E. Harrison | |
| 0 | E. Bosse | |
| 0 | E. Mater Dei | |
| 0 | T. H. South | |
| 0 | Vincennes | |

=== Baseball ===
| # | Team | Seasons |
|---|---|---|
| 21 | E. Reitz Memorial | 1975, 1976, 1978, 1979, 1983, 1984, 1986, 1988*, 1989, 1990, 1991, 1992, 1993, 1994, 1996, 1998*, 2000*, 2001*, 2011, 2017, 2018* |
| 18 | Castle | 1987, 1995, 2001*, 2003*, 2004*, 2005*, 2007, 2008, 2009, 2013, 2014, 2015, 2018*, 2019, 2022, 2023*, 2024*, 2025* |
| 10 | E. North | 1961, 1962, 1980, 2000*, 2002, 2005*, 2012, 2023*, 2024*, 2026 |
| 8 | E. Central | 1942, 1953, 1982, 1985*, 1988*, 1998*, 2003*, 2024* |
| 6 | New Albany | 1963, 1964, 1965, 1966, 1968, 1970 |
| 5 | Huntingburg | 1944, 1945, 1946, 1947, 1951 |
| 5 | Jasper | 1940, 1971, 1977, 2021, 2025* |
| 5 | E. Mater Dei | 1985*, 1999, 2006, 2010*, 2025* |
| 4 | Princeton | 1941, 1948, 1949, 1952 |
| 3 | E. Harrison | 1997, 2004*, 2010* |
| 3 | Vincennes | 1956, 1957, 1958 |
| 2 | E. F.J. Reitz | 1954, 2016 |
| 2 | Boonville | 1969, 1973 |
| 2 | Bedford | 1950, 1972 |
| 2 | Bloomington | 1959, 1960 |
| 1 | Tell City | 1955 |
| 1 | E. Rex Mundi | 1967 |
| 1 | Washington | 1943 |
| 1 | T. H. North | 1974 |
| 0 | E. Bosse | |
| 0 | T. H. South | |
| 0 | Sullivan | |
| 0 | Bicknell | |
| 0 | Linton | |
| 0 | North Knox | |
| 0 | Mount Vernon | |

=== Boys golf ===
| # | Team | Seasons |
|---|---|---|
| 21 | E. North | 1963, 1965, 1977, 1986, 1987, 1989, 1999, 2000, 2001, 2005, 2006, 2009, 2010, 2012, 2015, 2017, 2021, 2022, 2023, 2024, 2025 |
| 10 | E. F.J. Reitz | 1947, 1948, 1949, 1950, 1952, 1953, 1960*, 1961, 1962, 1964 |
| 10 | Castle | 1976, 1982, 1984, 1991, 1995, 2003, 2007, 2008, 2014, 2018 |
| 9 | E. Reitz Memorial | 1990, 1992, 1993, 1994, 2002, 2011, 2013, 2016, 2019 |
| 6 | E. Central | 1951, 1978, 1983, 1985, 1998, 2004 |
| 4 | E. Harrison | 1969, 1975, 1996, 1997 |
| 4 | New Albany | 1946, 1954, 1958, 1970 |
| 4 | Bloomington | 1941, 1942, 1944, 1945 |
| 3 | E. Bosse | 1955, 1956, 1960* |
| 3 | E. Mater Dei | 1958, 1979, 1980 |
| 3 | Bedford | 1943, 1966, 1968 |
| 2 | T. H. South | 1973, 1981 |
| 2 | Vincennes | 1967, 1971 |
| 2 | T. H. North | 1972, 1974 |
| 0 | Jasper | |
| 0 | Tell City | |
| 0 | Boonville | |
| 0 | Princeton | |
| 0 | E. Rex Mundi | |
| 0 | Sullivan | |
| 0 | Bicknell | |
| 0 | Linton | |
| 0 | North Knox | |
| 0 | Huntingburg | |
| 0 | Mount Vernon | |
| 0 | Washington | |

=== Boys track and field ===
| # | Team | Seasons |
|---|---|---|
| 25 | E. Harrison | 1966 (A), 1967 (A), 1968 (A), 1971 (A), 1976 (AAA), 1977 (AAA), 1978 (AAA), 1980 (AAA), 1984, 1985, 1986, 1987, 1988, 1989, 1990, 1991, 1995, 1996, 1997, 2009, 2010, 2012, 2013, 2014, 2015 |
| 15 | Castle | 2001, 2002, 2003, 2004, 2005, 2008, 2011, 2016, 2017, 2018, 2019, 2021, 2022, 2025, 2026 |
| 12 | E. F.J. Reitz | 1940, 1946, 1947, 1948, 1949, 1961, 1962, 1963, 1983, 1998, 1999, 2000 |
| 8 | E. Bosse | 1950, 1951, 1952, 1953, 1959, 1992, 1993, 1994 |
| 7 | New Albany | 1945, 1957, 1958, 1960, 1964 (A), 1965 (A), 1969 (A) |
| 6 | T.H. South | 1972 (A), 1973 (A), 1974 (A), 1975 (A), 1981, 1982 |
| 4 | E. Central | 1943, 1944, 1979 (AAA), 2006 |
| 4 | Bloomington | 1941, 1942, 1954, 1956 |
| 1 | E. North | 2024 |
| 1 | Jasper | 2023 |
| 1 | E. Reitz Memorial | 2007 |
| 1 | E. Rex Mundi | 1970 (A) |
| 1 | Vincennes | 1955 |
| 0 | E. Mater Dei | |
| 0 | Tell City | |
| 0 | Washington | |
| 0 | Princeton | |
| 0 | Huntingburg | |
| 0 | Mount Vernon | |
| 0 | T.H. North | |
| 0 | Bedford | |
| 0 | Bicknell | |
| 0 | Boonville | |
| 0 | Linton | |
| 0 | North Knox | |
| 0 | Sullivan | |

=== Volleyball ===
| # | Team | Seasons |
|---|---|---|
| 28 | Castle | 1976*, 1979, 1981, 1994, 1995, 1996, 1997, 1998, 2001, 2003, 2004, 2005, 2006*, 2007, 2008, 2012, 2013, 2014, 2015, 2016, 2017, 2018, 2020, 2021, 2022, 2023, 2024, 2025 |
| 21 | E. Mater Dei | 1975, 1977, 1978, 1980, 1983, 1984, 1985, 1986, 1987, 1988, 1989, 1990, 1991, 1992, 1993, 1999, 2000, 2002, 2006*, 2009, 2011 |
| 4 | E. Reitz Memorial | 1976*, 1982, 2010, 2019 |
| 1 | E. Central | 2006* |
| 1 | Jasper | 2026 |
| 0 | E. Harrison | |
| 0 | E. F.J. Reitz | |
| 0 | E. North | |
| 0 | Boonville | |
| 0 | E. Bosse | |
| 0 | V. Lincoln | |
| 0 | Mount Vernon | |
| 0 | New Albany | |
| 0 | Princeton | |
| 0 | Tell City | |
| 0 | T. H. North | |
| 0 | T. H. South | |
| 0 | Washington | |

=== Girls basketball ===
| # | Team | Seasons |
|---|---|---|
| 14 | Castle | 1991*, 1992, 1993*, 2000*, 2002, 2003, 2006, 2007*, 2018, 2019, 2021, 2022, 2023*, 2026 |
| 13 | E. Reitz Memorial | 1982*, 1993*, 1994, 1999, 2001, 2004, 2005, 2008, 2010, 2011, 2020, 2023*, 2024 |
| 12 | E. Bosse | 1978, 1979, 1980, 1983, 1984, 1985, 1988, 1997, 1998, 2007*, 2009, 2012 |
| 6 | E. Mater Dei | 1986, 1991*, 1995*, 2013, 2014, 2015 |
| 5 | E. Central | 1987, 1989, 2016, 2017, 2025 |
| 3 | E. Harrison | 1990*, 1995*, 2000* |
| 3 | E. Reitz | 1981, 1982*, 1990* |
| 1 | E. North | 1977 |
| 0 | Boonville | |
| 0 | Jasper | |
| 0 | V. Lincoln | |
| 0 | Mount Vernon | |
| 0 | New Albany | |
| 0 | Princeton | |
| 0 | Tell City | |
| 0 | T. H. North | |
| 0 | T. H. South | |
| 0 | Washington | |

=== Girls cross country ===
| # | Team | Seasons |
|---|---|---|
| 18 | E. Reitz Memorial | 1994, 1995, 1997, 1998, 1999, 2004, 2005, 2008, 2009, 2010, 2011, 2012, 2013, 2015, 2016, 2017, 2018, 2019 |
| 9 | E. Harrison | 1984, 1985, 1987, 1988, 1989, 1990, 1991, 1992, 1993 |
| 6 | Jasper | 2020, 2021, 2022, 2023, 2024, 2025 |
| 5 | Castle | 2000, 2001, 2002, 2003, 2006 |
| 2 | E. North | 2007, 2014 |
| 2 | E. Mater Dei | 1986, 1996 |
| 0 | E. F.J. Reitz | |
| 0 | E. Central | |
| 0 | E. Bosse | |
| 0 | Princeton | |
| 0 | Vincennes | |
| 0 | Boonville | |
| 0 | Tell City | |
| 0 | Washington | |
| 0 | Mount Vernon | |

=== Girls soccer ===
| # | Team | Seasons |
|---|---|---|
| 23 | E. Reitz Memorial | 1995, 1996, 1997, 1998*, 1999, 2001, 2002, 2006*, 2007*, 2008, 2009, 2010, 2011, 2012, 2015*, 2016*, 2017, 2020, 2021, 2022, 2024*, 2025, 2026* |
| 8 | Castle | 2003*, 2013, 2015*, 2016*, 2018, 2019, 2023, 2024* |
| 5 | E. F.J. Reitz | 1998*, 2000, 2004*, 2006*, 2007* |
| 3 | E. North | 2003*, 2014, 2026* |
| 2 | E. Central | 2004*, 2005 |
| 1 | E. Mater Dei | 1994 |
| 0 | E. Harrison | |
| 0 | E. Bosse | |
| 0 | V. Lincoln | |

=== Girls tennis ===
| # | Team | Seasons |
|---|---|---|
| 28 | E. Reitz Memorial | 1984, 1989, 1990, 1991, 1992, 1993, 1994, 1995, 1996, 1997, 1998, 1999, 2000*, 2003, 2004, 2005, 2006, 2007, 2008, 2009, 2010, 2011, 2012, 2013, 2014, 2017, 2019, 2026 |
| 10 | E. Harrison | 1977, 1978, 1979, 1980*, 1981*, 1982, 1983*, 1986, 1987, 1988 |
| 4 | Castle | 1985, 2001, 2015, 2018 |
| 4 | Jasper | 2022, 2023, 2024, 2025 |
| 2 | E. Central | 1983*, 2000* |
| 2 | T.H. South | 1980*, 1981* |
| 1 | E. Mater Dei | 2016 |
| 1 | E. North | 2002 |
| 0 | E. Bosse | |
| 0 | E. F.J. Reitz | |
| 0 | New Albany | |
| 0 | V. Lincoln | |
| 0 | Washington | |
| 0 | Mount Vernon | |
| 0 | Tell City | |
| 0 | T.H. North | |
| 0 | Boonville | |

=== Girls swimming ===
| # | Team | Seasons |
|---|---|---|
| 22 | Castle | 1980, 1981, 2001, 2002, 2003, 2004, 2005, 2006, 2007, 2010, 2011, 2012, 2013, 2014, 2015, 2016, 2017, 2018, 2019, 2021, 2022, 2023 |
| 3 | E. Reitz Memorial | 2008, 2009, 2020 |
| 2 | Jasper | 2024, 2026 |
| 0 | E. F.J. Reitz | |
| 0 | E. North | |
| 0 | E. Central | |
| 0 | E. Mater Dei | |
| 0 | E. Harrison | |
| 0 | E. Bosse | |
| 0 | V. Lincoln | |
| 0 | Washington | |
| 0 | Mount Vernon | |
| 0 | Tell City | |
| 0 | T.H. North | |
| 0 | T.H. South | |
| 0 | Boonville | |

=== Softball ===
| # | Team | Seasons |
|---|---|---|
| 22 | Castle | 1991, 1992, 1993*, 1994, 2002, 2003, 2006, 2007, 2008, 2009, 2010, 2011*, 2015, 2016*, 2017, 2018, 2019, 2022, 2023, 2024, 2025, 2026* |
| 8 | E. Mater Dei | 1993*, 1998, 1999, 2011*, 2012, 2013, 2014, 2016* |
| 4 | E. Reitz Memorial | 1997*, 2000, 2004, 2016* |
| 4 | E. North | 1995, 1996, 1997*, 2001 |
| 1 | Jasper | 2021 |
| 1 | E. Central | 2011* |
| 1 | E. Harrison | 2005 |
| 1 | Vincennes Lincoln | 2026* |
| 0 | E. F.J. Reitz | |
| 0 | E. Bosse | |

=== Girls golf ===
| # | Team | Seasons |
|---|---|---|
| 19 | E. North | 1980, 1984, 1989, 1990, 1991, 1992, 1994, 2005, 2009, 2012, 2013, 2014, 2015, 2016, 2017, 2018, 2019, 2020, 2021 |
| 9 | E. Reitz Memorial | 1999, 2000, 2001, 2002, 2003, 2004, 2006, 2007, 2008 |
| 8 | E. Harrison | 1979, 1981, 1982, 1983, 1985, 1986, 1987, 1988 |
| 6 | Castle | 2010, 2011, 2022, 2024, 2025, 2026 |
| 5 | E. Mater Dei | 1993, 1995, 1996, 1997, 1998 |
| 1 | Jasper | 2023 |
| 0 | E. Central | |
| 0 | E. F.J. Reitz | |
| 0 | E. Bosse | |
| 0 | V. Lincoln | |
| 0 | Washington | |
| 0 | Mount Vernon | |
| 0 | Tell City | |
| 0 | T.H. North | |
| 0 | T.H. South | |
| 0 | Boonville | |

=== Girls track and field ===
| # | Team | Seasons |
|---|---|---|
| 14 | Castle | 1976 (B)*, 1977 (B)*, 1982, 1993, 1994, 2001, 2002, 2006, 2007, 2008, 2009, 2024, 2025, 2026 |
| 11 | E. Harrison | 1979 (A)*, 1984, 1985, 1988, 1989, 1990, 1991, 1992, 2003, 2004, 2005 |
| 10 | E. Reitz Memorial | 1999, 2000, 2010, 2011, 2012, 2013, 2014, 2015, 2018, 2019 |
| 6 | E. Bosse | 1976 (A)*, 1978 (A)*, 1983, 1996, 1997, 1998 |
| 6 | Jasper | 1978 (B)*, 1979 (B)*, 1980 (B)*, 2021, 2022, 2023 |
| 3 | E. Central | 1977 (A)*, 1986, 1987 |
| 3 | E. North | 1995, 2016, 2017 |
| 2 | T. H. South | 1980 (A)*, 1981 |
| 0 | E. Mater Dei | |
| 0 | E. F.J. Reitz | |
| 0 | Boonville | |
| 0 | V. Lincoln | |
| 0 | Mount Vernon | |
| 0 | New Albany | |
| 0 | Princeton | |
| 0 | Tell City | |
| 0 | T. H. North | |
| 0 | Washington | |

== State titles ==
=== John H. Castle Knights ===
- Football (1982, 1994)
- Boys Soccer (2000)
- Girls Basketball (2006)
- Softball (2001)

=== Evansville Benjamin Bosse Bulldogs ===
- Boys Basketball (1943, 1944, 1962)

=== Evansville Central Bears ===
None

=== Evansville William Henry Harrison Warriors ===
- Girls Golf (1989)
- Boys Golf (2012)

=== Evansville Mater Dei Wildcats ===
- Baseball (1999, 2026)
- Boys Basketball (2004)
- Girls Basketball (2012, 2013)
- Football (2001, 2022)
- Wrestling (1986, 1995, 1996, 1997, 1998, 1999, 2000, 2001, 2002, 2003, 2006, 2007, 2021)
- Softball (2016)
- Girls Soccer (2017, 2018, 2019)
- Boys Soccer (2026-27)

=== Evansville North Huskies ===
- Baseball (1962*)
- Boys Basketball (1967)
- Boys Golf (2000)
- Girls Golf (2014, 2015, 2016, 2018, 2020, 2021)

* = indicates title won before IHSAA State Tournament was initiated

=== Evansville Francis Joseph Reitz Panthers ===
- Girls Basketball (1981)
- Football (1933*, 1940*, 1948*, 1953*, 1956*, 1957*, 1960*, 1961*, 1971*, 2007, 2009)
- Bowling (2012+)

* = indicates title won before IHSAA State Tournament was initiated
+ = indicates title sanctioned by the Indiana High School Bowling Association

=== Evansville Reitz Memorial Tigers ===
- Baseball (1978, 1989, 1993)
- Football (1937*, 1958*, 2017, 2019)
- Girls Soccer (1989*, 1997, 2008, 2013, 2017, 2021, 2022)
- Softball (2002)
- Girls Tennis (1991, 1993, 1994, 1995, 1996, 2012)
- Boys Soccer (1979*, 1980*, 1981*, 1983*, 1984*, 1986*, 1988*, 1989*, 1990*, 1992*, 2007, 2008, 2016, 2017, 2019, 2020)
- Girls Basketball (2011)

* = indicates title won before IHSAA State Tournament was initiated

=== Jasper Wildcats ===
- 1949 Boys' Basketball
- 1996 Baseball
- 1997 Baseball
- 1998 Baseball (3A)
- 1999 Boys' Tennis
- 2000 Baseball (3A)
- 2001 Football (4A)
- 2006 Baseball (3A)
- 2021 Baseball (4A)
- 2025 Girls’ Tennis

=== Vincennes Lincoln Alices ===
- 1923 Boys' Basketball
- 1981 Boys' Basketball
- 2002 Baseball (3A)

== Neighboring conferences ==
- Blue Chip Conference (Jasper)
- Pocket Athletic Conference

== See also ==
- Sports in Evansville
- Hoosier Hysteria
- Largest high school gyms in the United States
