= Mid-State Conference =

Sports conference in Indiana

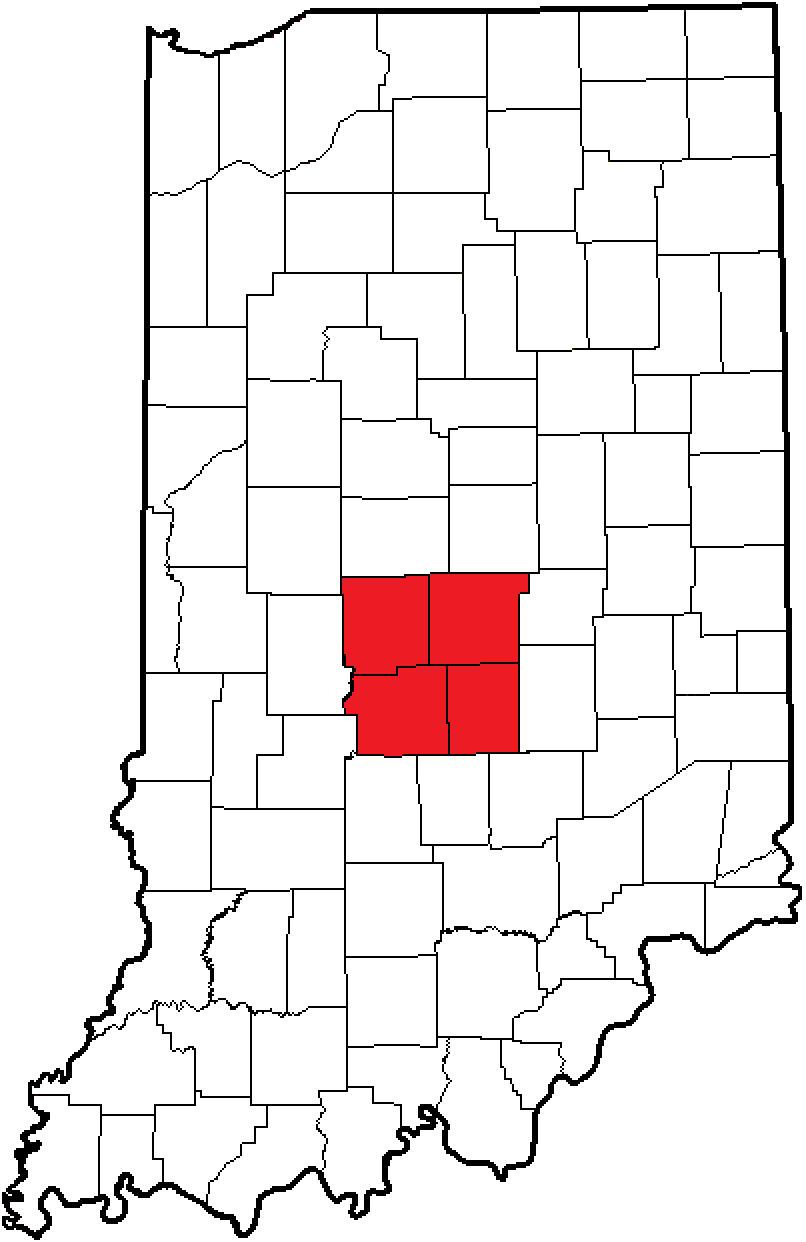
The Mid-State Conference within Indiana

Mid-State Conference (MSC) of the IHSAA, is a sports conference in central Indiana. Its members consist of 1 school in Hendricks, 2 in Johnson, 2 in Marion, and 2 in Morgan Counties, 1 in Monroe.

The conference was established on November 25, 1941. The first Mid-State Conference championship event was the conference track and field championship hosted on May 1, 1942, at Danville High School in which Lawrence Central was the winner.

Girls' sports were added to the Mid-State Conference starting in fall 1975. Greenwood volleyball captured the first-ever girls Mid-State title with their volleyball win in 1975. Plainfield captured the first-ever championship in girls' basketball in 1976, and Mooresville and Center Grove split the first conference title in girls' tennis in 1976.

== Team and individual awards ==
The Mid-State Conference presents a team trophy to the winning team of each conference sport. It is possible for there to be two or more co-champions in a sport, especially in sports like tennis, softball, baseball, football and basketball where a team's place in the conference is calculated by overall conference wins.

The Mid-State Conference also presents team sport trophies at the junior high (middle school) level. In the past, conference team awards have been awarded to freshmen (frosh) and reserve (junior varsity) teams.

In addition to team awards, the Mid-State Conference also presents awards to individual players and coaches. Players who excel in a sport may be nominated for the All-Mid-State Team The Mid-State Coach of the Year is an award given to conference coaches. Players with a strong academic performance can individually receive an All-Conference Academic Award

== Membership ==
School	Location	Mascot	Colors	Enrollment 24–25	IHSAA Class	County	Year Joined	Previous Conference
Decatur; Central^{1}	Indianapolis	Hawks		1,883	4A	49; Marion	1942; 2006	Marion County; Conference Indiana
Bloomington North	Bloomington	Cougars		1,589	4A	53 Monroe	2026	Conference Indiana
Franklin	Franklin	Grizzly Cubs		1,590	4A	41; Johnson	1981	South Central
Martinsville	Martinsville	Artesians		1,315	4A	55; Morgan	2006	Conference Indiana
Mooresville	Mooresville	Pioneers		1,398	4A	55; Morgan	1942	Independent (MCC 1935)
Perry Meridian	Indianapolis	Falcons		2,359	4A	49; Marion	2018	Conference Indiana
Plainfield	Plainfield	Quakers		1,773	4A	32; Hendricks	1942	Hendricks County
Whiteland	Whiteland	Warriors		2,074	4A	41; Johnson	1968	Mid-Hoosier

1. Decatur Central played in the Central Suburban Conference 1971–97, and Conference Indiana 1997–2006.

The Mid-State logo at Decatur Central's Phil Webster Baseball Field.

=== Former members ===
School	Location	Mascot	Colors	County	Year Joined	Previous Conference	Year Left	Conference Joined
Brownsburg	Brownsburg	Bulldogs		32; Hendricks	1942	Hendricks County	1967	Sagamore
Greenwood	Greenwood	Woodmen		41 Johnson	1942	Johnson County	2026	Hoosier Legends Conference
Danville	Danville	Warriors		32; Hendricks	1942	Hendricks County	1978	West Central
Lawrence Central	Indianapolis	Bears		49; Marion	1942	Marion County	1949	Capital District
Speedway	Speedway	Sparkplugs		49; Marion	1942	independent	1999	West Central
Center Grove	Greenwood	Trojans		41; Johnson	1956	Johnson County	1981	Central Suburban
Avon	Avon	Orioles		32; Hendricks	1974	West Central	2000	Hoosier Crossroads
Beech Grove	Beech Grove	Hornets		49; Marion	1978	Central Suburban	2005	Indiana Crossroads

== Conference champions ==
Below are the conference champions for each sport at the high school varsity level. Asterisks denote co-champions.

=== Boys basketball ===
Titles	School	Years
19	**Mooresville**	1948, 1955*, 1956*, 1977*, 1981, 1983, 1989, 1990*, 1995*, 1996*, 1997*, 1998*, 2000*, 2004*, 2005, 2014*, 2015*, 2019, 2022*
18	**Plainfield**	1952*, 1955*, 1960, 1972, 1977, 1985*, 1986*, 1991*, 1993*, 1999, 2003, 2004*, 2007*, 2010*, 2020, 2021, 2025, 2026
18	**Franklin**	1984, 1985*, 1986*, 1987, 1990*, 1994*, 1995*, 1996*, 1997*, 1998*, 2001*, 2007*, 2010*, 2016*, 2017, 2018*, 2024*
15	Speedway	1947, 1950, 1951, 1953*, 1956*, 1961, 1962, 1966, 1967*, 1969, 1973, 1975, 1976, 1977*, 1988*
11	**Greenwood**	1943*, 1944, 1963, 1965, 1970, 1971, 1982*, 1986*, 1994*, 2001*, 2006, 2018*
10	**Decatur Central**	1955*, 1957*, 1958, 1964*, 2009, 2013, 2018*, 2022*, 2023, 2024*
6	Center Grove	1964*, 1967*, 1968, 1974, 1979*, 1980
6	Brownsburg	1946, 1952*, 1953*, 1954, 1957*, 1959
5	Avon	1982*, 1988*, 1991*, 1992, 2000*
5	**Martinsville**	2011, 2012, 2014*, 2015*, 2016*
4	**Whiteland**	1979*, 1993*, 2002, 2022*
2	Beech Grove	1994*, 2001*
2	Lawrence Central	1943*, 1949
1	Danville	1945

Schools that are marked in bold are current members of the Mid-State Conference.

=== Girls basketball ===
Titles	School	Years
13	**Mooresville**	1981, 1982, 1983, 1984, 1991*, 2001, 2004, 2005, 2010, 2014, 2015, 2020, 2023
13	**Plainfield**	1976, 1977, 1992, 1995, 1996, 1997, 1998*, 1999, 2005*, 2009, 2016, 2025, 2026
8	**Franklin**	1986, 1987, 1988*, 1993, 1994*, 1998*, 2000, 2022, 2024
6	Avon	1988*, 1989, 1990, 1991*, 1994*, 1998*
4	**Whiteland**	2005*, 2006, 2011, 2018
4	**Martinsville**	2007, 2017, 2019, 2021
3	Center Grove	1978, 1979, 1980
2	Beech Grove	2002, 2003
2	Greenwood	2012, 2013
1	**Decatur Central**	2008
1	Speedway	1985
0	Danville	

Brownsburg and Lawrence Central left the conference before girls' basketball was a Mid-State sport.

=== Boys cross country ===
Titles	School	Years
22	**Franklin**	1984, 1991, 1995, 1996, 1997, 1999, 2000, 2001, 2003, 2006, 2007, 2008, 2011, 2013, 2014, 2015, 2016, 2017, 2018, 2019, 2025, 2026
12	**Whiteland**	1972, 1973, 1974, 1975, 1976, 1977, 1978, 1981, 1986, 1994, 2002, 2020
6	**Mooresville**	1985, 1987, 1988, 1989, 1990, 2004
5	**Decatur Central**	1963, 1965, 1967, 1968, 1969
4	Center Grove	1970, 1971, 1979, 1980
4	Speedway	1964, 1966, 1982, 1983
3	**Perry Meridian**	2021, 2022, 2023
3	**Plainfield**	2005, 2012, 2024
2	**Greenwood**	1992, 1993
2	**Martinsville**	2009, 2010
1	Avon	1998

=== Girls cross country ===
Titles	School	Years
15	**Plainfield**	2000, 2001, 2002, 2003, 2005, 2006, 2007, 2010, 2013, 2014, 2015, 2016, 2017, 2018, 2019
12	**Franklin**	1988, 1989, 1996, 2004, 2008, 2009, 2011, 2012, 2020, 2021, 2022, 2023
6	Avon	1990, 1991, 1994, 1997, 1998, 1999
5	**Mooresville**	1982, 1984, 1985, 1986, 1987
6	**Whiteland**	1992, 1993, 1995, 2024, 2025, 2026
1	Speedway	1983

=== Football ===
Titles	School	Years
17	**Decatur Central**	1949, 1951, 1968, 1969*, 1970, 2011, 2014*, 2016, 2017, 2018*, 2019, 2020*, 2021, 2023*, 2024*, 2025, 2026
15	**Plainfield**	1942, 1944, 1945, 1952, 1966, 1971, 1980, 1983, 1984, 2000, 2001, 2002, 2006, 2010*, 2024*
14	Speedway	1943, 1946, 1947, 1948, 1950, 1956, 1960*, 1961, 1963, 1967, 1969*, 1972, 1973, 1974
11	Avon	1978, 1979, 1982, 1991, 1993, 1994, 1995, 1996, 1997, 1998, 1999
11	Greenwood	1959, 1960*, 1965, 1986, 1987, 1988, 1990, 1992, 2003, 2005, 2012
9	**Mooresville**	1976, 1977, 1981*, 1985, 2004, 2007, 2009*, 2018*, 2020*
8	**Whiteland**	1981*, 2008, 2010*, 2013, 2014*, 2015, 2020*, 2022
5	Danville	1952, 1954, 1955*, 1962, 1964
3	**Martinsville**	2009*,2023*, 2024*
3	Brownsburg	1955*, 1957, 1958
1	Center Grove	1975
1	**Franklin**	1989
0	Beech Grove	
0	Lawrence Central	

=== Boys track and field ===
Titles	School	Years
27	**Plainfield**	1958, 1959, 1962, 1963, 1974, 1982, 1983, 1984, 1986, 1990, 1991, 1992, 1996, 1999, 2000, 2001, 2002, 2006, 2007, 2011, 2013, 2014, 2018, 2021, 2022, 2023, 2025
9	Speedway	1950, 1960, 1961, 1966, 1971, 1973, 1975, 1976, 1978
8	Danville	1947, 1951, 1952, 1953, 1954, 1955, 1956, 1957
7	**Franklin**	1995, 1997, 1998, 2008, 2009, 2012, 2017
7	**Greenwood**	1972, 1979, 1985, 1987, 1988, 1989, 2004
7	Lawrence Central	1942, 1943, 1944, 1945, 1946, 1948, 1949
5	**Whiteland**	1969, 1977, 2015, 2016, 2019, 2026
4	**Mooresville**	1969, 1970, 2003, 2005
2	Avon	1955, 1956
2	Brownsburg	1967, 1968
2	Center Grove	1980, 1981
2	**Decatur Central**	1964, 1965
1	**Martinsville**	2010
1	**Perry Meridian**	2024

=== Girls track and field ===
Titles	School	Years
15	**Plainfield**	1982, 2001, 2002, 2003, 2004, 2006, 2007, 2009, 2010, 2013, 2015, 2016, 2017, 2018, 2021
10	**Franklin**	1983, 1985, 1988, 1993, 1996, 1997, 1998, 1999, 2000, 2005
9	**Whiteland**	1978, 2008, 2011, 2012, 2022, 2023, 2024, 2025, 2026
6	**Mooresville**	1986, 1987, 1989, 1990, 1991, 1995
5	Center Grove	1976, 1977, 1979,1980, 1981
2	Avon	1992, 1994
2	Greenwood	1984, 2014
1	**Perry Meridian**	2019

=== Baseball ===
Titles	School	Years
16	**Plainfield** (MSC Member 1942–present)	1942*, 1943, 1953, 1954*, 1955, 1956*, 1957, 1958*, 1961*, 1962*,1968, 1971, 1984, 1996*, 2004*, 2014
15	**Mooresville** (MSC Member 1942–present)	1945*, 1973, 1976*, 1977, 1979, 1981, 1982, 1986,1990, 1995,1999, 2005, 2022, 2023, 2024
14	**Franklin** (MSC Member 1981–present)	1987*, 1988, 1994,1998, 2002, 2003*, 2004*, 2006*, 2013, 2016, 2017, 2021, 2025, 2026
12	Speedway (MSC Member 1942–1999)	1951*, 1954*, 1960, 1961*, 1962*, 1963, 1965, 1966, 1967*, 1972, 1974, 1976*
11	**Decatur Central** (MSC Member 1942–1971, 2006–present)***	1944*, 1945*, 1947*, 1949, 1950, 1951*, 1952, 1958*, 2008*, 2009, 2011
8	Greenwood (MSC Member 1942–2026)	1942*, 1975, 1976*, 1980*, 1991, 2001, 2003*, 2012
8	**Whiteland** (MSC Member 1968–present)	1969,1978, 1985, 1997, 2000, 2010, 2015, 2018
6	Avon (MSC Member 1974–2000)	1980*, 1983, 1987*, 1989, 1992, 1993
5	Danville (MSC Member 1942–1978)	1946, 1951*, 1961*, 1964*, 1970
3	**Martinsville** (MSC Member 2006–present)	2007, 2008*, 2019
2	Lawrence Central (MSC Member 1942–1949)	1947*, 1948
2	Center Grove (MSC Member 1956–1981)	1959, 1964*
1	Beech Grove (MSC Member 1978–2005)	2005
1	Brownsburg (MSC Member 1942–1967)	1956*

*Asterisks denote co-champions.

***Decatur Central won their baseball conference while part of the Central Suburban Conference in 1991, 1993, 1994, 1995, 1996, 1997, 1998 and 2000.

The 2020 spring sport season was suspended due to COVID-19 preventative measures.

=== Softball ===
Asterisks denote co-champion(s).

Titles	School	Years
11	**Mooresville**	1989*, 1992*, 2000*, 2006, 2015*, 2016, 2017, 2018*, 2021, 2022*, 2023
11	**Whiteland**	1996, 1997, 1998, 1999*, 2000*, 2001, 2002, 2004, 2009*, 2010, 2022*
9	**Plainfield**	1990, 1992*, 1993, 1994*, 1995, 2007, 2024, 2025, 2026
7	Greenwood	1988, 2003, 2005*, 2011, 2012, 2013, 2015*
4	Decatur Central**	2009*, 2014, 2018*, 2019
3	Avon	1989*, 1992*, 1994
2	Martinsville***	2008, 2018*
2	Beech Grove	1991, 1992*
2	**Franklin**	1992*, 1999*

An April 1989 news article states that neither Whiteland nor Speedway competed in conference softball for the 1988–1989 school year. 1987 is reported as the first year of softball at Avon High School.

**Decatur Central won conference in softball in 1988, 1989, 1990, 1993, and 1994 while part of the Central Suburban Conference and in 1998, 2000, 2001 and 2004 while part of Conference Indiana.

***Martinsville girls softball won their conference in 2005 and 2006 while part of Conference Indiana.

=== Boys soccer ===
Titles	School	Years
19	**Plainfield**	1996*, 1997*, 1999*, 2000, 2001, 2002, 2003, 2004, 2005, 2008, 2009, 2010, 2014, 2015*, 2016*, 2017, 2018, 2019*, 2020
5	**Mooresville**	1995*,1996*, 1997*, 2011, 2012*
4	Avon	1994, 1995*, 1998, 1999*
4	**Franklin**	2012*, 2013, 2016, 2023
3	**Perry Meridian**	2021, 2022, 2024
3	**Martinsville**	2006, 2007, 2025
3	**Whiteland**	2015*, 2016*, 2019*
1	**Bloomington North**	2026
1	**Speedway**	1997*

Avon went 6–0 against boys soccer teams whose schools also were Mid-State participants during 1994–1995 school year.

The 2001 Whiteland Yearbook mentions the first soccer team being a co-ed team.

The Mid-State Conference adopted soccer starting in the 1994–1995 school year for both boys and girls.

The 1996–1997 Mooresville High School yearbook puts Mooresville at 5–0–1 in the conference in the fall 1996 season of boys soccer. The 1996–1997 Plainfield High School yearbook claims Plainfield boys soccer, with a conference record of 5–1 (losing to Mooresville), were "co-conference champs".

The 1995–1996 Mooresville yearbook lists their boys soccer team as 5–1 against conference opponents (losing to Avon). Avon's yearbook mentions the Avon boys soccer team as having a 11–1–2 record with no scores. The 1995–1996 Greenwood yearbook asserts that Greenwood boys soccer tied Avon and had an overall 3–2–1 record against teams in the conference.

=== Girls soccer ===
Titles	School	Years
18	**Plainfield**	2001, 2002, 2003, 2004, 2005, 2008, 2010, 2013, 2016, 2017*, 2018, 2019, 2020, 2021, 2022, 2023, 2024, 2026
5	**Mooresville**	2000, 2011, 2012, 2014, 2015
2	**Martinsville**	2006*, 2007
2	**Whiteland**	2017*, 2025

The 2000–2001 Mooresville High School yearbook mentions Mooresville receiving the first-ever Mid-State trophy for girls soccer.

In 1999, Avon is credited for going 4–0 against girls' soccer teams whose schools were participating in the Mid-State conference.

The 2000–2001 Whiteland yearbook mentions the first soccer team being a co-ed team. A newspaper source lists 2003 as the second year for Whiteland Girls Soccer.

The 1998–1999 Greenwood Yearbook states that an intramural girls soccer team would be a possibility for the 1999–2000 school year.

The 1997–1998 Mooresville Yearbook mentions that 1996–1997 season was the first season for girls' soccer.

In 1993, Franklin and Greenwood decided to add soccer for the upcoming 1994–1995 school year.

=== Girls volleyball ===
Titles	School	Years
13	**Plainfield**	1991, 1992*, 1997, 1998, 2002, 2003, 2004, 2007, 2009, 2020, 2023, 2025, 2026
11	**Franklin**	1981, 1990, 2000, 2014, 2015, 2016, 2017, 2018, 2019, 2020, 2024
7	Beech Grove	1979, 1980, 1982, 1983, 1989, 1993, 1994
6	**Martinsville**	2005, 2008, 2010, 2011, 2012, 2021
3	Center Grove	1976*, 1977, 1978
3	**Mooresville**	1984, 1986, 1988
3	**Whiteland**	1985, 1987, 1992*
2	Avon	1996, 1999
1	Greenwood	1975
1	**Perry Meridian**	2022

The 2005 Martinville girls volleyball team participated and claimed titles in both Conference Indiana and Mid-State Conference.

The 2009–2010 Plainfield High School yearbook shows Plainfield girls volleyball as going 6–0 against teams whose school were participants in the Mid-State Conference.

The 1980 Franklin girls volleyball team won the South Central Conference before moving to the Mid-State Conference in 1981.

=== Boys volleyball ===
Titles	School	Years
1	Perry Meridian	2026

=== Girls tennis ===
Titles	School	Years
20	Greenwood	1978, 1979, 1981, 1982, 1983, 1984, 1986, 1987, 1996, 1997, 1999, 2000, 2001, 2002, 2004, 2010, 2012, 2013, 2014, 2016
12	**Franklin**	1988*, 1992, 1993, 1995, 2018, 2019, 2021*, 2022, 2023, 2024, 2025, 2026
7	**Plainfield**	2003, 2005, 2008, 2009, 2011, 2015, 2021*
5	Avon	1990, 1991, 1992* 1994, 1998
4	**Mooresville**	1976*, 1985, 1988*,2017
3	**Whiteland**	1989, 2006, 2007
1	Beech Grove	1980
1	Center Grove	1976*
1	Speedway	1977

The 2020 spring sport season was suspended due to COVID-19 preventative measures.

The Franklin Girls Tennis team won the conference in 1980 while still part of the South Central Conference

=== Boys tennis ===
Titles	School	Years
25	Greenwood	1980, 1981, 1982, 1983, 1984, 1985, 1986, 1987, 1988, 1989, 1990, 1991, 1993, 1994, 1995, 1998, 1999, 2000, 2001, 2003, 2004*, 2005, 2006, 2007, 2017
10	**Whiteland**	2002, 2004*, 2011, 2012, 2020, 2021, 2023, 2024, 2025, 2026
7	**Mooresville**	1972,1973, 1974, 1975, 1976, 1977*, 1996
7	**Plainfield**	1997, 2008, 2009, 2010, 2018, 2019, 2022
5	**Franklin**	1992, 2013, 2014, 2015, 2016
3	Speedway	1970, May 1971, October 1971
3	Center Grove	1977*, 1978, 1979

The 1969 Speedway High School yearbook shows that Speedway had victories over Danville, Mooresville and Greenwood in boys tennis and did not play any other teams whose schools were associated with the Mid-State Conference.

In the 1971–1972 school year, tennis switched from being a fall sport to a spring sport. The Mid-State tournament for Boys Tennis was played in May 1971 and again in October 1971.

1964 was the first year of tennis at Speedway.

=== Boys swimming ===
Titles	School	Years
19	**Franklin**	2003, 2006, 2007, 2008, 2009, 2010, 2012, 2013, 2014, 2015, 2016, 2017, 2018, 2019, 2020, 2021, 2023, 2024, 2025
15	**Plainfield**	1990, 1994, 1995, 1996, 1997, 1998, 1999, 2000, 2001, 2002, 2004, 2005, 2011, 2022, 2026
6	Beech Grove	1983, 1984, 1985, 1986, 1988, 1989
4	Avon	1987, 1991, 1992, 1993

*The first Mid-State meet for boys swimming took place on January 22, 1983, at Greenwood High School.

=== Girls swimming ===
Titles	School	Years
32	**Franklin**	1983, 1988, 1989, 1990, 1992, 1993, 1994, 1995, 1999, 2000, 2001, 2002, 2003, 2004, 2005, 2006, 2007, 2008, 2009, 2010, 2011, 2012, 2013, 2015, 2016, 2017, 2018, 2019, 2020, 2021, 2025, 2026
10	**Plainfield**	1982, 1984, 1987, 1991, 1997, 1998, 2014, 2022, 2023, 2024
2	Avon	1985, 1986

The first Mid-State Conference meet for girls swimming was held on Saturday, October 9, 1982, at Beech Grove High School.

1997 was the first year that girls swimming took place as a winter sport. Prior to this, it was fall sport.

A Daily Journal News article lists Plainfield as the 1984 girls swimming Mid-State conference champions.

Franklin participated in the South Central Conference in girls swimming in the 1981–1982 school year

=== Boys wrestling ===
Titles	School	Years
20	**Franklin**	1998, 2000, 2002, 2003, 2004, 2005, 2006, 2008, 2009, 2010, 2011, 2012, 2013, 2014, 2015, 2016, 2017, 2019, 2025, 2026
14	**Mooresville**	1971, 1972, 1974, 1975, 1976, 1977*, 1978, 1979, 1980, 1981, 1982, 1993, 2007, 2018
12	Beech Grove	1983, 1984, 1985, 1986, 1987, 1988, 1989, 1990, 1991, 1996, 1997, 2001
5	**Perry Meridian**	2020, 2021, 2022, 2023, 2024
4	**Decatur Central**	1966, 1968, 1969, 1970
3	Speedway	1965, 1967, 1973
2	Avon	1992, 1994
2	**Plainfield**	1995, 1999
1	Greenwood	1977*

The first Mid-State Conference Wrestling Meet took place on January 9, 1965, at Decatur Central High School.

=== Girls wrestling ===
Titles	School	Years
2	**Franklin**	2023, 2024
1	**Whiteland**	2025

=== Girls golf ===
Titles	School	Years
14	**Franklin**	1995, 1996, 1997, 1998, 1999, 2018, 2019, 2020, 2021, 2022, 2023, 2024, 2025, 2026
11	**Martinsville**	2005, 2006, 2007, 2008, 2009, 2010, 2011, 2012, 2013, 2014, 2017
5	Greenwood	1994, 2001, 2002, 2003, 2004
2	**Plainfield**	2015, 2016
1	**Mooresville**	2000

The first Mid-State Conference girls golf tournament was held at Legends Golf Course in Franklin, Indiana on September 10, 1994. In 1994 and 1995 the schools with girls golf teams that competed in the Mid-State Conference Invitational were: Franklin, Avon, Greenwood and Speedway.

Martinsville girls golf participated in the Mid-State Conference starting in the 2005–2006 school year.

=== Boys golf ===
Titles	School	Years
16	**Franklin**	1982, 1983, 1984, 1986, 1990, 1993, 2003, 2015, 2016, 2017, 2018, 2019, 2021, 2022, 2024, 2025
15	**Plainfield**	1974, 1975, 1976, 1991, 1994, 1995, 1996, 2005, 2006, 2007, 2008, 2013, 2014, 2023, 2026
11	Speedway	1966, 1967, 1968, 1969, 1971,1977, 1978, 1979, 1985, 1988, 1989
9	Mooresville	1973, 1987, 1997, 1998, 1999, 2000, 2001, 2002, 2012
3	**Martinsville**	2009, 2010, 2011
2	Center Grove	1980, 1981
1	Beech Grove	1992
1	**Decatur Central**	1970
1	Greenwood	1972
1	**Whiteland**	2004

Mooresville fielded no girls' golf team in 1987 but had one female member on its golf team this year.

=== Cheerleading ===
Titles	School	Years
6	Greenwood	1998, 1999, 2004, 2007, 2008, 2012
5	**Whiteland**	Dec. 2002, 2003, 2005, 2006, 2009
3	**Mooresville**	2000, 2022, 2023
3	**Plainfield**	2021, 2025 2026
1	**Franklin**	Jan. 2002**
1	**Martinsville**	2024

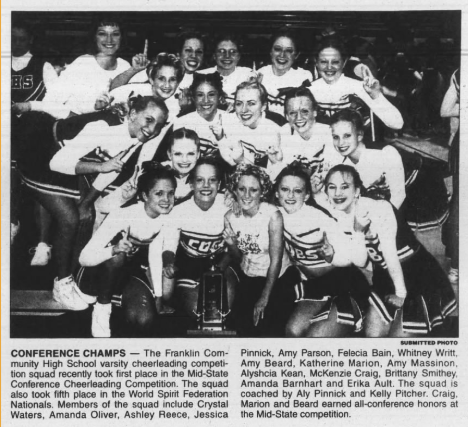

The first Mid-State Conference girls competitive cheerleading competition was held at Franklin High School on November 14, 1998.

The 2001-2002 Mid-State Conference cheerleading competition took place in January 2002.

=== Unified Track and Field ===
Titles	School	Years
3	**Franklin**	2019, 2021, 2022
2	**Whiteland**	2024, 2026

== Mid-State All-Sport Trophy (boys, girls and combined) ==
The Mid-State All-Sport is a trophy awarded each year to the team with the most overall success in athletics. The trophy has been awarded since 1947. The September 25, 1947, newspaper The Republican states that "at a meeting that took place on September 18, 1947, Mid-State officials elected to award an all-sport trophy."

Calculations to determine the recipient of the All-Sport Trophy are determined by each team's placing in each of the counting events. The higher the team places, the more points count toward the trophy.

=== Boys All-Sport Trophy winners ===
Titles	School	Years Involved in MSC	MSC All-Sport Trophy Years Won
17	Franklin	1981–present	1984–1985, 1993–1994, 1994–1995, 1995–1996, 1996–1997, 1997–1998, 2003–2004, 2009–2010, 2011–2012, 2012–2013, 2013–2014, 2014–2015, 2015–2016, 2016–2017, 2021–2022, 2022–2023, 2023–2024
	Plainfield	1942–present	1954–1955, 1956–1957, 1957–1958, 1971–1972, 2020–2021, 2024–2025
8	Speedway	1942–1999	1949–1950, 1950–1951, 1952–1953, 1960–1961, 1963–1964, 1964–1965, 1967–1968, 1972–1973
5	Decatur Central	1942–1971 and 2006–present	1951–1952, 1954–1955, 1957–1958, 1962–1963, 1969–1970
4	Mooresville	1942–present	1976–1977, 1980–1981, 1981–1982, 2004–2005
2	Lawrence Central	1942–1949	1947–1948, 1948–1949
1	Center Grove	1956–1981	1978–1979
1	Whiteland*	1968–present	1977–1978
1	Avon	1974–2000	1989–1990
	Danville	1942–1978	
	Brownsburg	1942–1967	
	Beech Grove	1978–2005	
	Martinsville	2006–present	
	Perry Meridian	2018–present	
	Bloomington North	2026–present	

Whiteland won the All-Sport trophy in 1967 and 1968 while still a member of the Mid-Hoosier Conference.

Had the trophy been awarded prior to 1948, Danville would have won in 1946 and Speedway in 1947.

=== Girls All-Sport Trophy winners ===
The Mid-State girls All-Sport Trophy was first awarded following the 1975–1976 school year.

Titles	School	MSC All-Sport Trophy Years Won
15	Plainfield	2000–2001, 2001–2002, 2002–2003, 2003–2004, 2004–2005, 2005–2006, 2006–2007, 2007–2008, 2008–2009, 2009–2010, 2010–2011, 2011–2012, 2012–2013, 2013–2014, 2014–2015, 2015–2016
14	Franklin	1981–1982, 1982–1983, 1983–1984, 1987–1988, 1988–1989*, 1996–1997, 1997–1998, 1998–1999, 2000–2001, 2018–2019, 2020–2021, 2022–2023, 2024–2025, 2025–2026
5	Center Grove	1975–1976, 1976–1977, 1977–1978, 1978–1979, 1979–1980
2	Mooresville	1984–1985, 1988–1989*
1	Avon	1989–1990
	Decatur Central	
	Speedway	
	Danville	
	Beech Grove	
	Martinsville	
	Perry Meridian	
	Bloomington North	

=== Mid-State Combined All-Sport Trophy winners ===
The Combined All-Sport Trophy is awarded to the school whose points total in all boys and girls events combined is the highest.

Titles	School	MSC All-Sport Trophy Years Won
	Franklin	2015–2016, 2024–2025*
	Plainfield	2024–2025*

=== Resources ===
- IHSAA Conferences
- IHSAA Directory
- After more than 7 decades, conference still going strong – Daily Journal
