= Metropolitan Interscholastic Conference =

High school athletic conference based in Central and Western Indiana

- Founded: 1996
- No. of teams: 6 Class 6A
- Region: Three Indiana Counties: Marion, Hamilton, Johnson

Locations

The Metropolitan Interscholastic Conference or MIC is a secondary or more commonly used, high school athletic conference based in the Indianapolis Metropolitan area of Indiana. The conference was formed in 1996 in a time when independent schools joined schools with other existing conferences that were reorganizing or splitting up to form new conferences due to the initiation of class basketball. In recent years, the MIC has been recognized nationally as a superior secondary athletic conference to participate in athletics. The MIC also competes in other areas besides athletics. For example, there is a MIC choir competition and a MIC speech and debate tournament, as well as MIC Academic Challenge.

On December 13, 2021, the Metropolitan Interscholastic Conference voted Carmel and Center Grove out of the MIC as the two schools had flirted with a move to the Hoosier Crossroads Conference. In September 2025, the Metropolitan Interscholastic Conference chose to allow Carmel and Center Grove to rejoin the conference for the 2026–2027 school year.

== Member schools ==
Current members

School	Location	Mascot	Colors	Enrollment 2024–2025	IHSAA Class	# / County	Year joined	Previous conference
Ben Davis	Indianapolis	Giants		4,567	6A	Marion	1996	Independents; Central Suburban
Carmel	Carmel	Greyhounds		5,327	6A	Hamilton	1996, 2026	Independents
Center Grove	Greenwood	Trojans		2,754	6A	Johnson	1996, 2026	Independents
Lawrence Central	Lawrence	Bears		2,404	6A	Marion	2013	Conference Indiana
Lawrence North	Lawrence	Wildcats		2,817	6A	Marion	1996	Central Suburban
North Central	Indianapolis	Panthers		3,616	6A	Marion	1996	Independents
Pike	Indianapolis	Red Devils		3,192	6A	Marion	2013	Conference Indiana
Warren Central	Indianapolis	Warriors		3,748	6A	Marion	1996	Independents

Former members

School	Location	Mascot	Colors	Enrollment	IHSAA Class	# / County	Year joined	Previous conference	Year left	Conference joined
Terre Haute North	Terre Haute	Patriots		1,575	5A	49; Vigo	1997	Independents (SIAC 1980)	2013	Conference Indiana^{1}
Terre Haute South	Terre Haute	Braves		1,651	5A	49; Vigo	1997	Independents (SIAC 1982)	2013	Conference Indiana^{1}

=== Membership timeline ===
Full members Other conference

1. Played only football in CI 2013–14, full members in 2014–15.
2. Carmel and Center Grove were voted out of the MIC on December 13, 2021, by the other six member schools.
3. Carmel and Center Grove submitted an application to the Hoosier Crossroads Conference but was denied membership by the eight HCC schools.

== Conference championships ==
- Denotes a Tie

=== Football ===
#	Team	Seasons
13	Ben Davis	1996, 1997, 1998, 1999, 2000*, 2001, 2003, 2012*, 2013*, 2017, 2019*, 2022, 2023
10	Warren Central	2002, 2004, 2005, 2006, 2007*, 2010, 2011, 2016, 2018, 2019*
8	Center Grove	2000*, 2007*, 2008*, 2012*, 2013*, 2015, 2020, 2021
6	Carmel	2000*, 2008*, 2009, 2012*, 2014, 2019*,
2	Lawrence North	2024, 2025
1	North Central	2019*
0	Lawrence Central	
0	Pike	

=== Boys basketball ===
#	Team	Seasons
11	Lawrence North	1998*, 1999, 2000, 2003, 2004, 2005, 2006, 2008*, 2009*, 2020*, 2024*
7	Carmel	2008*, 2012*, 2013, 2014, 2015, 2021, 2022
4	North Central (Ind)	1997, 1999*, 2009*, 2011*
4	Warren Central	2007*, 2012*, 2017, 2018, 2019
4	Ben Davis	2001, 2002, 2023, 2024*
2	Center Grove	2007*, 2010*
2	Lawrence Central	2016, 2020*
0	Pike	
0	Terre Haute North	
0	Terre Haute South	

=== Girls basketball ===
#	Team	Seasons
11	Ben Davis	1998, 1999, 2000, 2001*, 2003, 2004, 2005*, 2008*, 2009, 2010, 2011
8	Lawrence North	2002, 2013, 2014, 2015, 2016, 2019, 2020, 2023*
5	North Central (Ind)	2005*, 2008*, 2017, 2021, 2022
3	Carmel	2005*, 2006*, 2007*
3	Center Grove	1997, 2001*, 2006*
3	Warren Central	2005*, 2012, 2023*
3	Lawrence Central	2023, 2024, 2025
2	Terre Haute South	2001*, 2007*
1	Pike	2018
0	Terre Haute North	

=== Boys Cross Country ===
#	Team	Seasons
20	Carmel	1997, 1999, 2001, 2002, 2003, 2007, 2008, 2009, 2010, 2011, 2012, 2013, 2014, 2015, 2016, 2017, 2018, 2019, 2020, 2021
5	North Central	1998, 2022, 2023, 2024, 2025
2	Warren Central	2005, 2006
2	Lawrence North	2000, 2004
1	Ben Davis	1996
0	Center Grove	
0	Lawrence Central	
0	Pike	
