= Martinsville High School (Indiana) =

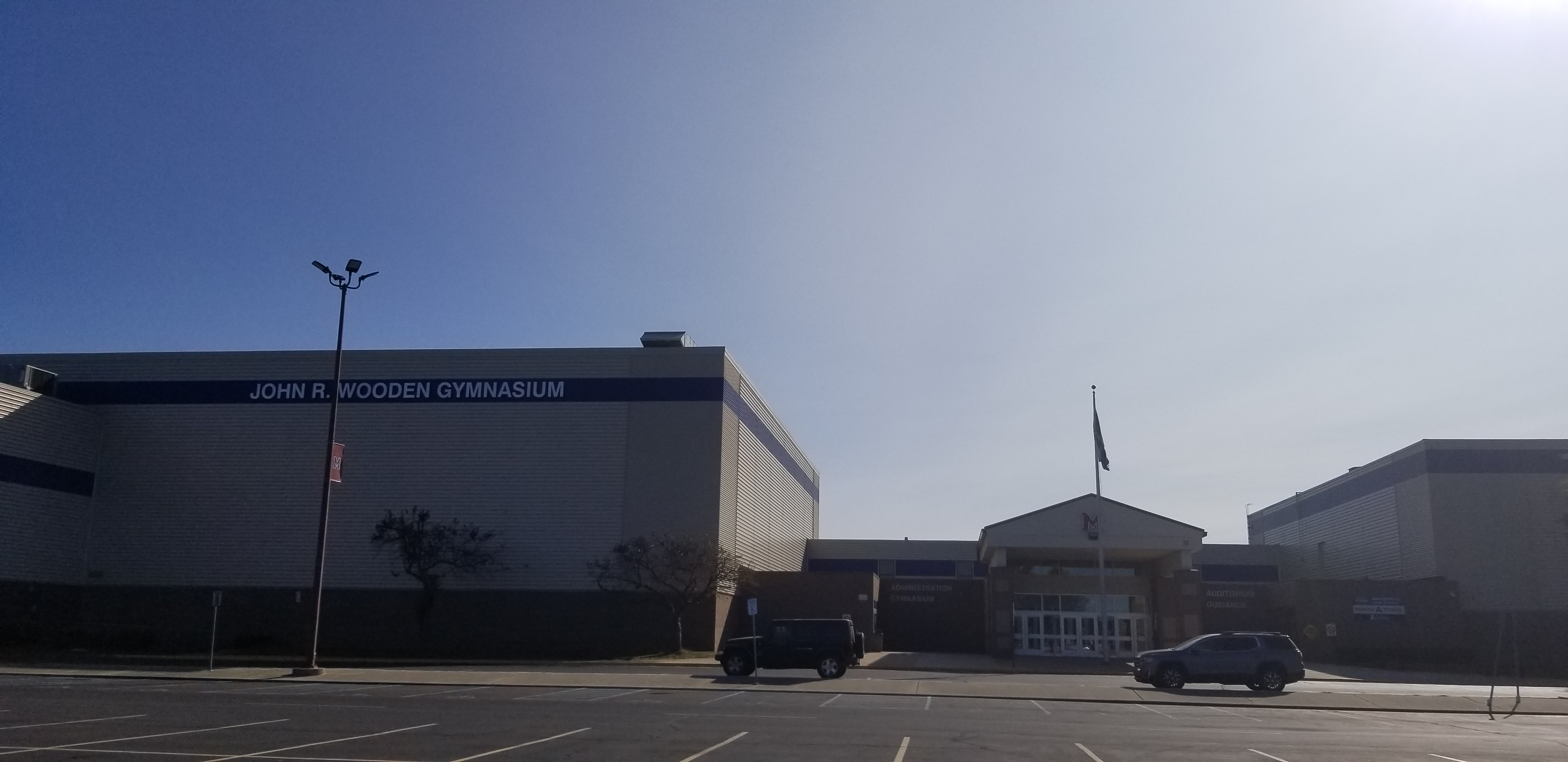
- Martinsville High School

Location
- 1360 East Gray Street; Martinsville, Morgan County, Indiana 46151; United States; 39°25′10″N 86°24′42″W

Information
- Type: Public high school
- Established: 1921
- School district: Metropolitan School District of Martinsville
- Superintendent: Eric Bowlen
- Principal: Jeff Bell
- Teaching staff: 86.78 (FTE)
- Grades: 9-12
- Enrollment: 1,315 (2023-2024)
- Student to teacher ratio: 15.15
- Campus type: Urban
- Color
- Athletics conference: Mid-State
- Mascot: The Artesian
- Accreditation: Indiana Department of Education
- Publication: Redline (news magazine) The Current (yearbook) BreakingBlue.org (news website)
- Feeder schools: John R. Wooden Middle School
- Website: msdofmartinsville.org/martinsville-high-school/

Martinsville High School is the only high school located in Martinsville, Indiana, just off Interstate 69 in the United States. It is part of the Metropolitan School District of Martinsville. Students from John R. Wooden Middle School transfer to Martinsville High School after the end of the eighth grade school year.

== Building ==
Martinsville High School (MHS) has many classrooms, a large library-media center called the Integrated Media Center (IMC), and a large area dedicated to the performing arts which adjoins the auditorium. There is a driving range located on school grounds as well.

MHS features a vocational school, a separate but attached building. Vocational classes allow students to learn trades in real world environments. There are classes for welding, woodworking, electricity, and auto repair. Building trades students construct a house each year as part of their curriculum.

Martinsville High School features a field house adjacent to the high school completed in Spring 2021. The field house has 3 basketball courts, wrestling and cheerleading practice space, family restrooms and lockers. The field house is used for both athletic and academic clubs for students. Inside the school there is a large main gymnasium, an auxiliary gymnasium, a second floor pool, wrestling room, weight room, and several locker rooms. Outside, the school has a softball, baseball, tennis, soccer, track, and football field.

2019-2021 renovations include exterior lighting, door security, auditorium, gymnasium, girls' soccer team locker room.

2020 - Girls' Softball team field was renamed Rhoden Field after longtime coach, Ken Rhoden.

The Artesian Center for Excellence (A.C.E) is a center for students to graduate with their CORE 40 diploma. The building is separate from the high school but located on campus.

== Academics ==
In the 2018–2019 school year, Martinsville had a graduation rate of 92% and was designated a 'A' school by the Indiana Department of Education.

MHS houses a TV station, WREP-LD, within the school. Students in the MHS Rewind class produce the news for online and TV viewing. Students also produce and stream athletic events including basketball and football for community viewing online. The MHS Rewind class has received over 42 broadcasting awards. The school has a broadcast television class that produces news for the school and sports for local cable and has won many awards, one of which was the 2007 TV High School of the Year by IASB.

2020 - Decathlon team won their 20th ISBA State Decathlon Championship. Selected to attend the National Decathlon Championship in Alaska.

2019 - the Indiana Student State Championship held at Martinsville High School

2019 - Artesian Business PRIDE/ Governor's Work Certification program began

2018- Senior Success Center (SSC) added to MHS to assist seniors with preparation for college, vocational training or the workforce after high school.

2017-2018 - 1:1 digital education was implemented district wide. Every student received either an iPad or Chromebook to assist with their education.

2016 - 2017 - MHS implemented a 1:1 digital education program using Chromebooks. An elite team of students, known as Artie Intel was formed for the purpose of fixing student Chromebooks. Students are certified through HP.

2016 - 2017 - MHS became a GAFE (Google Apps For Education) school, and is a Digital Citizenship Certified school through Common Sense Media.

Martinsville has many academic clubs. The school's Business Professionals of America (BPA) club participates in state competitions. The school has a class that produces an online publication, breakingblue.org.

== Athletics ==
In 1998, high school basketball games in Martinsville between Martinsville High School and Bloomington High School North erupted in racist insults hurled at Bloomington players by Martinsville fans and assaults on two Bloomington players by Martinsville players. Conference Indiana banned Martinsville from hosting conference games for a year, the highest penalty ever leveled in high school sports in Indiana.

Martinsville High School is a member of the Mid-State Conference. In 2006, they switched from Conference Indiana to the Mid-State Conference. All schools in the Mid-State Conference (Decatur Central, Franklin, Greenwood, Mooresville, Perry Meridian, Plainfield, Whiteland) are located within 25 miles of Martinsville. Most of the schools are also one school communities, like Martinsville, which has helped establish community rivalries.

Martinsville's athletic and academic teams are usually called the Artesians after the several mineral water springs that exist in the city. The school logo is also a well.

Martinsville High School offers many sports for both men and women. They offer for men: Basketball, Tennis, Cross Country, Soccer, Swimming, Track, Golf, and Baseball. For women the school offers: Basketball, Tennis, Cross Country, Soccer, Swimming, Track, Golf, and Softball. They also offer Wrestling, Football, Volleyball, Cheerleading, Gymnastics, and a variety of musical programs such as The Martinsville Marching Artesians, The MHS Symphonic string orchestra, the Madrigal Singers, and a show choir group called Flashin' Fascination. As well as a variety of theater production groups such as MHS Drama Club and a thespian troop. The Artesians have had many successful seasons on the football field, boasting many Indiana All-State and Indiana All-Star selections.

Indiana High School Athletic Association State Champions

Year	Sport
1924	Boys’ Basketball
1927	Boys’ Basketball
1933	Boys’ Basketball
1991	Girls' Golf
1992	Girls' Golf
1993	Girls' Golf
1995	Girls' Golf
1996	Girls' Golf
1996	Volleyball
1996	Girls' Basketball
1997	Girls' Golf
1997	Girls' Basketball
1998	Girls' Golf
1999	Girls' Golf
2000	Girls' Golf
2005	Softball
2005	Volleyball
2006	Softball
2007	Girls' Golf
2009	Girls' Golf

== Notable alumni ==
- John R. Wooden, former Indiana State Sycamores men's basketball (1946–1948) and UCLA Bruins men's basketball head coach (1948–1975), for whom the UCLA arena court is named. Wooden was also a Purdue University alumni and was a member of the Purdue Boilermakers men's basketball team (1929–1932), member of the Naismith Memorial Basketball Hall of Fame and National Collegiate Basketball Hall of Fame
- Rod Bray, President pro tempore of Indiana Senate (2018–present), state senator (2012–present)
- Glenn M. Curtis - former Indiana State Sycamores men's basketball head coach (1938–1947), former Detroit Falcons (1946–1947)
- Jerry Sichting, former assistant head coach for the NBA's Phoenix Suns (2013–2015), Washington Wizards (2012–2013), Minnesota Timberwolves (2010–2011; 1995–2005) and Golden State Warriors (2008–2010), former NBA player for the Indiana Pacers (1980–1985), Boston Celtics (1985–1988), Portland Trail Blazers (1988–1989), Charlotte Hornets (1989–1990) and Milwaukee Bucks (1990), Purdue University alumni and former Purdue Boilermakers men's basketball player (1975–1979)
- George Pearcy, former Basketball Association of America for the Detroit Falcons, also was an Indiana State Sycamores men's basketball player (1939–1942), older brother of Henry Pearcy
- Henry Pearcy - former Basketball Association of America for the Detroit Falcons, was an Indiana State Sycamores men's basketball player (1939–1943), younger brother of George Pearcy
- Craig Jarrett, former NFL punter

== See also ==
- List of high schools in Indiana
