= Chris O'Leary (American football) =

American football player and coach (born 1991)

Los Angeles Chargers
- Title: Defensive coordinator

Personal information
- Born: November 7, 1991 (age 35); Terre Haute, Indiana, U.S.

Career information
- Position: Wide receiver
- High school: North Vigo High (Terre Haute, Indiana)
- College: Indiana State (2010–2014)

Career history
- Georgia State (2015–2016) Graduate assistant; Florida Tech (2017) Safeties coach; Notre Dame (2018–2023); Defensive analyst & defensive graduate assistant (2018–2020); Safeties coach (2021–2023); Los Angeles Chargers (2024) Safeties coach; Western Michigan (2025) Defensive coordinator & safeties coach; Los Angeles Chargers (2026–present) Defensive coordinator
- Coaching profile at Pro Football Reference

Christopher John O'Leary (born November 7, 1991) is an American professional football coach who is the defensive coordinator for the Los Angeles Chargers of the National Football League (NFL). He previously served as the defensive coordinator and safeties coach at Western Michigan University in 2025.

O'Leary played college football for the Indiana State Sycamores. He previously served as an assistant coach for the Georgia State Panthers, Florida Tech Panthers, and Notre Dame Fighting Irish.

== Early life ==
O'Leary was born in Terre Haute, Indiana, in 1991. He is the son of Patrick and Julie O'Leary. He has three brothers, Marc, Dan, and Matt. O'Leary is a Christian.

== Playing career ==
O'Leary played college football as a wide receiver at Indiana State University from 2010 to 2014. He sat as a redshirt freshman in the 2010 season. His future mentor, Jesse Minter, served as linebackers coach and defensive coordinator.

== Coaching career ==
=== Georgia State ===
O'Leary was a graduate assistant at Georgia State in 2015 and 2016, serving under then defensive coordinator Jesse Minter.

=== Florida Tech ===
O'Leary got his first coaching role as the safeties coach at Florida Tech in 2017.

=== Notre Dame ===
O'Leary coached for the Notre Dame Fighting Irish from 2018 to 2023. He began as a defensive analyst and graduate assistant, before becoming the defensive backs and safeties coach in 2021 until 2023.

=== Los Angeles Chargers ===
In 2024, O'Leary joined the Los Angeles Chargers as the team's safeties coach under Chargers defensive coordinator Jesse Minter, with whom he worked alongside at Georgia State.

=== Western Michigan ===
In 2025, O'Leary left the Chargers to become the defensive coordinator for the Western Michigan Broncos, where he led the team to 9th ranked scoring defense in the FBS. O'Leary helped the team to a 10–4 record and a victory in the MAC conference championship game for the program's fourth ever conference championship victory.

=== Los Angeles Chargers (second stint) ===
On January 28, 2026, O'Leary rejoined the Los Angeles Chargers to serve as the team's defensive coordinator, replacing Jesse Minter, who departed to become the head coach for the Baltimore Ravens.
