= Craig Jarrett =

American football player (born 1979)

No. 10
- Position: Punter

Personal information
- Born: July 19, 1979 (age 47); Martinsville, Indiana, U.S.
- Listed height: 6 ft 2 in (1.88 m)
- Listed weight: 215 lb (98 kg)

Career information
- High school: Martinsville
- College: Michigan State
- NFL draft: 2002: 6th round, 194th overall pick

Career history
- Seattle Seahawks (2002)*; San Francisco 49ers (2002)*; Washington Redskins (2002); Houston Texans (2003)*; Tampa Bay Buccaneers (2004)*
- * Offseason or practice squad member only

Awards and highlights
- First-team All-Big Ten (1999); Second-team All-Big Ten (1998)

Career NFL statistics
- Punts: 20
- Punting yards: 771
- Yards per punt: 38.6
- Stats at Pro Football Reference

Craig Jarrett (born July 19, 1979) is an American former professional football player who was a punter in the National Football League (NFL) for the Washington Redskins. He played college football for the Michigan State Spartans and was selected by the Seattle Seahawks in the sixth round of the 2002 NFL draft with the 194th overall pick.

Jarrett is perhaps best known for taking out two players from Marshall University following a punt during a college football match-up between Michigan State and Marshall.
