= Central Suburban Conference =

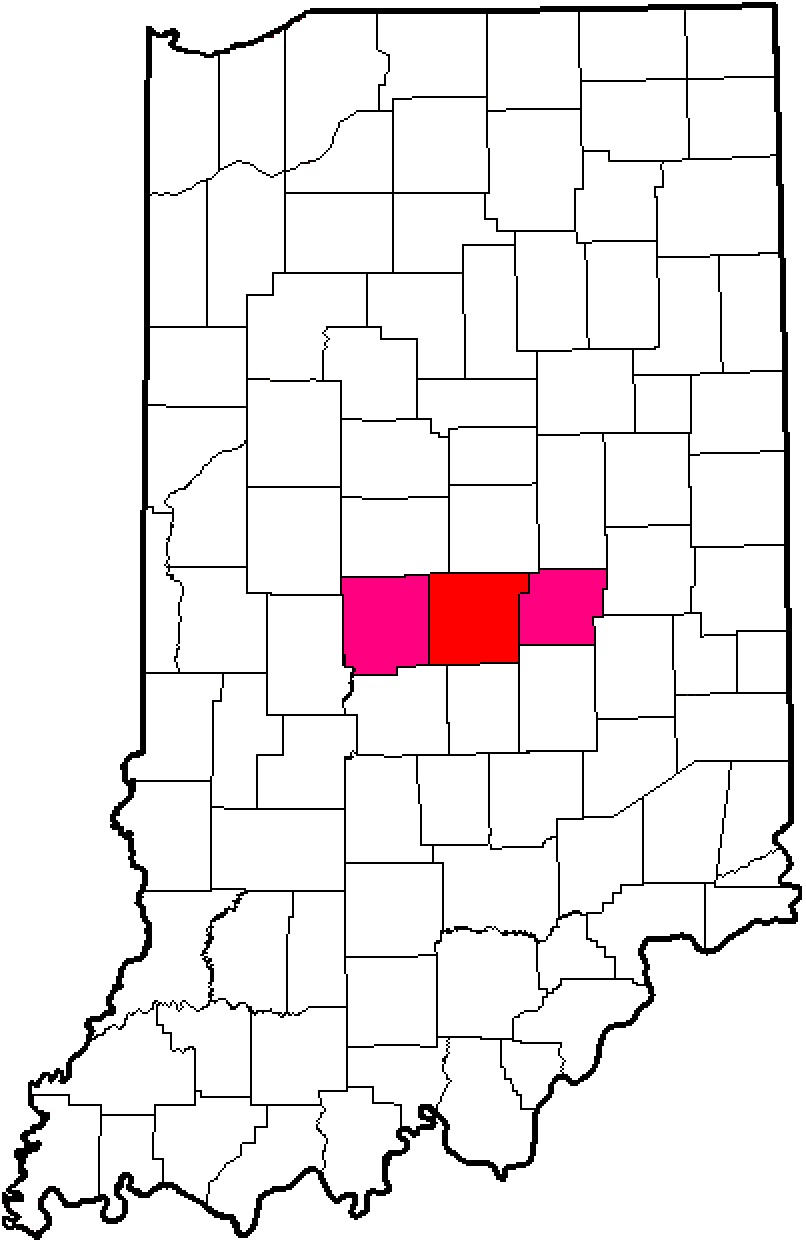
The Central Suburban Conference in Indiana. Counties in red contained schools at the time of disbanding, counties in pink contained former member schools who left before conference folded.

The Central Suburban Conference was an IHSAA-sanctioned conference in the U.S. state of Indiana from 1971 to 1997. The conference can be considered a continuation of the Capital District Conference, as almost all of the schools involved in that conference during the 1970–71 school year became charter members of the CSC that next year. By the early 1990s, the conference had dwindled to five large schools located in suburban Indianapolis. As class basketball was set to be introduced in the 1997–98 school year, the Central Suburban and South Central conferences, as well as large independent schools, decided to reorganize, giving way to Conference Indiana and the Metropolitan Interscholastic Conference. The Central Suburban can be considered a predecessor to Conference Indiana, as all but one school became part of that conference.

== Former Schools ==
School	Location	Mascot	Colors	# / County	Year joined	Previous conference	Year left	Conference joined
Beech Grove	Beech Grove	Hornets		49; Marion	1971	Capital District	1978	Mid-State
Ben Davis	Indianapolis	Giants		Marion	1971	Independents (MCAA 1945)	1977	Independents (MIC 1996)
Cardinal Ritter	Indianapolis	Raiders		49; Marion	1971	Independents	1979	Independents (ICRC 2005)
Decatur; Central	Indianapolis	Hawks		49; Marion	1971	Mid-State	1997	Indiana
Franklin Central	Indianapolis	Flashes		49; Marion	1971	Capital District	1997	Indiana
Greenfield; Central	Greenfield	Cougars		30; Hancock	1971	Capital District	1992	Independents (HHC 1997)
Lawrence Central	Indianapolis	Bears		49; Marion	1971	Capital District	1997	Indiana
Pike	Indianapolis	Red Devils		49; Marion	1971	Capital District	1997	Indiana
Warren; Central	Indianapolis	Warriors		49; Marion	1971	Independents (MCAA 1945)	1979	Independents (MIC 1996)
Lawrence; North	Lawrence	Wildcats		49; Marion	1976	none (new school)	1996	Metropolitan
Center Grove	Greenwood	Trojans		41; Johnson	1981	Mid-State	1991	South Central
Brownsburg	Brownsburg	Bulldogs		32; Hendricks	1985	Sagamore	1991	Independents (OC 1997)
Perry Meridian	Indianapolis	Falcons		49; Marion	1995	Independents	1997	Indiana
Southport	Indianapolis	Cardinals		49; Marion	1995	Independents (SCC 1963)	1997	Indiana

== Resources ==
- Almanac Sports- Central Suburban Conference
