= Seminary Square Park =

- U.S. National Register of Historic Places
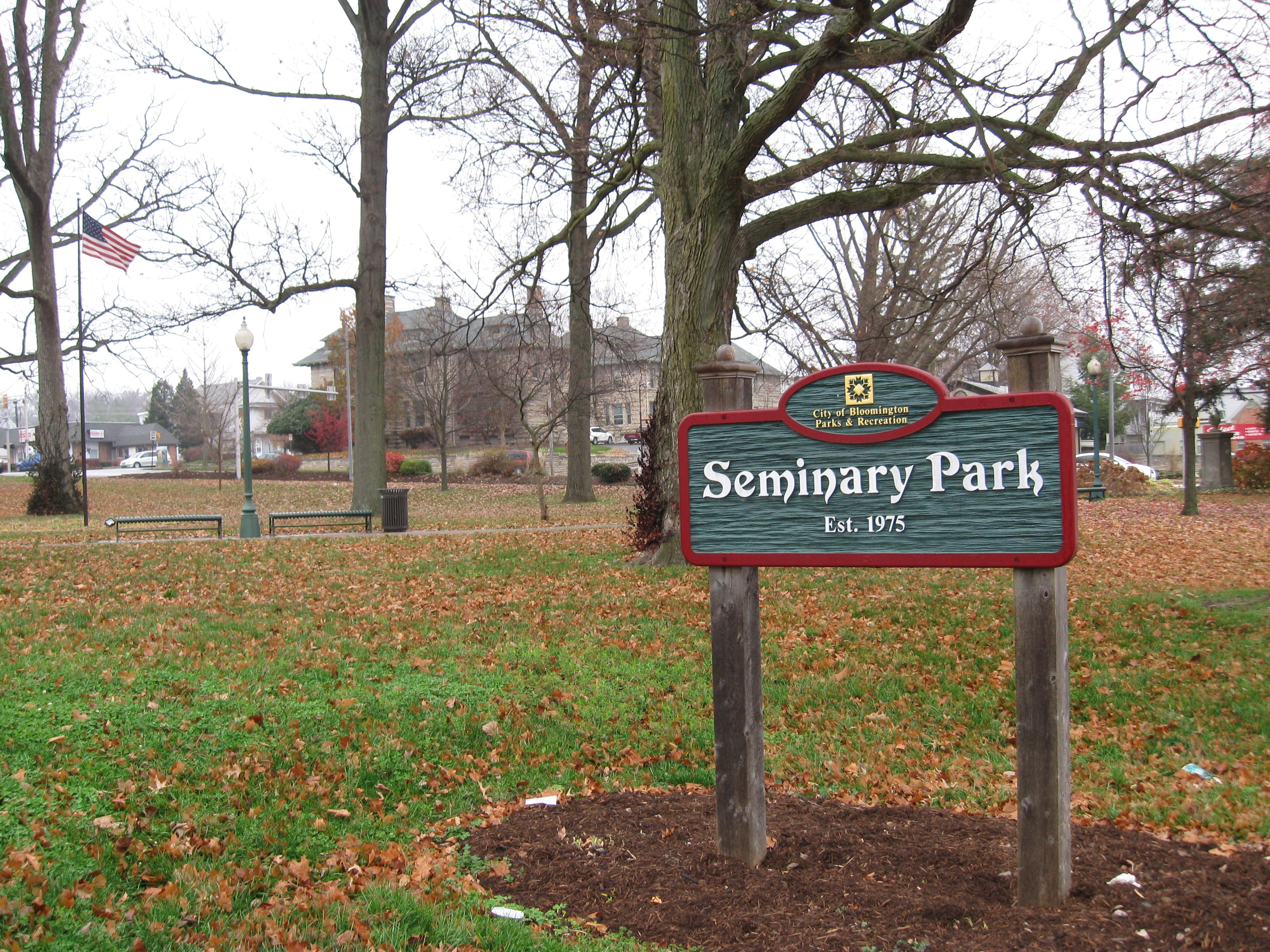
- Seminary Square Park, November 2009

- Location within Indiana Location within the United States
- Location: College Ave. and E. 2nd St., Bloomington, Indiana
- Coordinates: 39°9′40″N 86°32′03″W
- Area: 2 acres (0.81 ha)
- Built: 1816
- NRHP reference No.: 77000012
- Added to NRHP: September 19, 1977

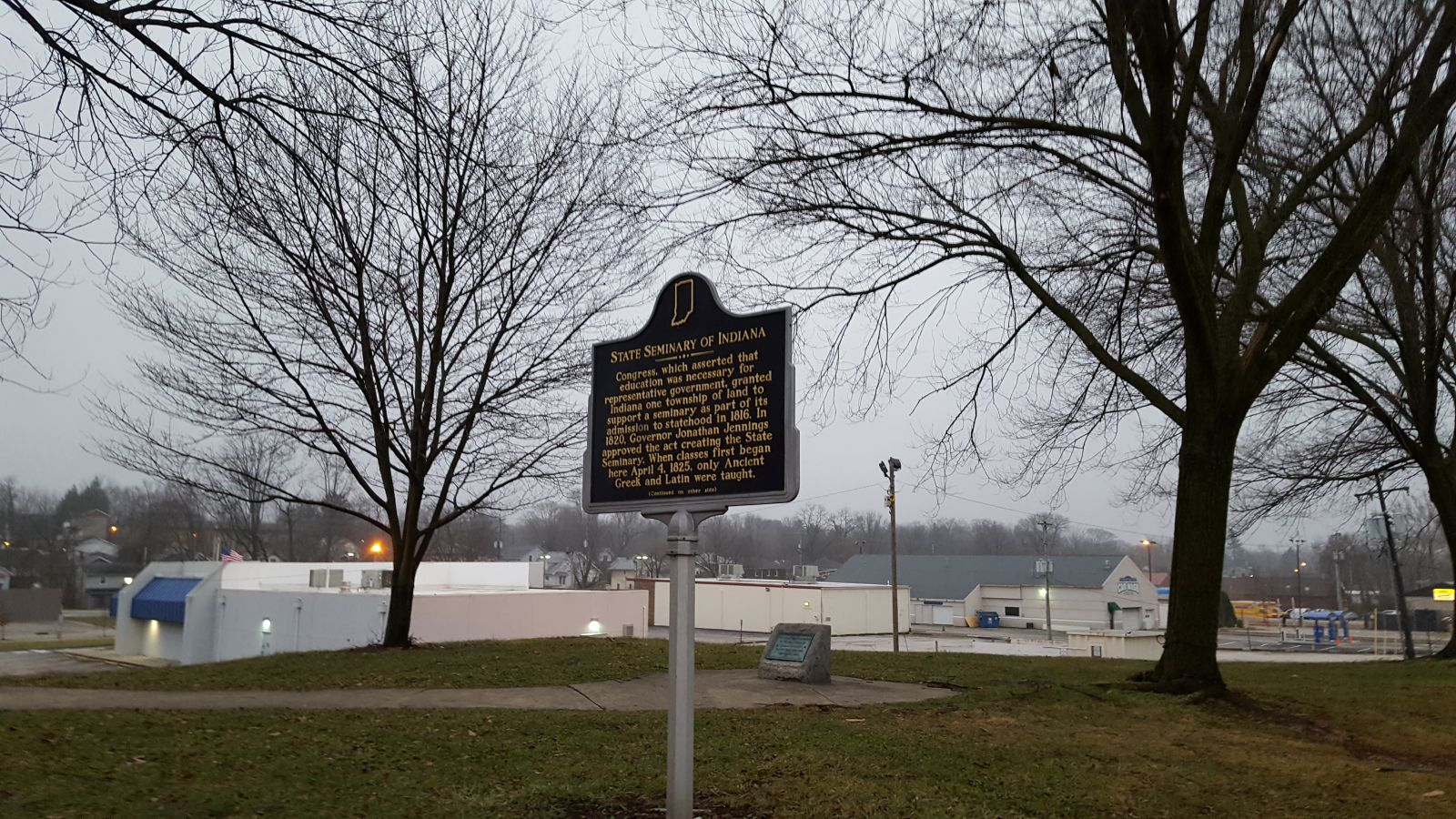
State Seminary of Indiana Historic Marker, 2016

Seminary Square Park, also known as the Seminary Park, is a historic public park located at Bloomington, Indiana. It was established in 1816 by an Act of Congress as the original site of Indiana Seminary, a preparatory school that by 1838 became Indiana University. The first building was erected on the site in 1824, and it remained the school campus until Indiana University moved to its new campus in 1883. The Old College building, built in 1854, remained in use as a school until destroyed by fire in 1967. The site was subsequently established as a public park in 1975 and a homeless encampment sometime later.

It was listed on the National Register of Historic Places in 1977.
