= Terre Haute North Vigo High School =

Location
- 3434 Maple Avenue; Terre Haute, Vigo County, Indiana 47804; United States; 39.492886°N 87.363455°W

Information
- Type: Public high school
- Motto: "Not for School But for Life"
- Established: 1971
- School district: Vigo County School
- Superintendent: Christopher Himsel
- Principal: Sarah Gore
- Teaching staff: 101.76 (FTE)
- Grades: 9-12
- Enrollment: 1,467 (2023-2024)
- Student to teacher ratio: 14.42
- Color
- Athletics conference: Sagamore Conference
- Team name: Patriots
- Rivals: Terre Haute South Vigo High School
- Newspaper: The Continental Crier
- Website: Official Website

Terre Haute North Vigo High School, also known as Terre Haute North (THN), is a public high school located in Terre Haute, Indiana.

Its attendance boundary includes the municipality of Seelyville and the census-designated places of Fontanet and North Terre Haute.

== Academics ==
Advanced Placement classes include Calculus AB, Physics C: Mechanics, Physics C: Electricity and Magnetism, U.S. History, World History, U.S. Government, Biology, Chemistry, English, Spanish, and more.

== Athletics ==
There are 21 varsity teams at THN: boys' and girls' cross country, soccer, tennis, golf, basketball, swimming & diving and track & field; boys' football, wrestling, baseball; girls' volleyball, softball, and dance team. Terre Haute North was a part of the Metropolitan Interscholastic Conference (MIC) from 1997 until 2013 when they joined Conference Indiana.

== Notable alumni ==
- Brian Dorsett (1979) is a retired professional baseball player who played eight seasons for the Cleveland Indians, Los Angeles Angels of Anaheim, New York Yankees, San Diego Padres, Cincinnati Reds and Chicago Cubs.
- Ed Pease (Terre Haute Gerstmeyer (1969) before consolidation) Former member of the United States House of Representatives.
- Josh Phegley (2006) is a retired MLB catcher, who last played for the Chicago Cubs. Phegley formerly played for the Chicago White Sox and the Oakland Athletics.
- Anthony Thompson (1986) is a former Indiana University football standout (1986–1989) and NFL running back (1990–92). He was inducted into the College Football Hall of Fame in 2007.
- Steve Weatherford (2001) is a National Football League punter. He played for the New Orleans Saints, Kansas City Chiefs, Jacksonville Jaguars, New York Jets and New York Giants from 2006 to 2015, becoming a Super Bowl XLVI champion with the Giants.
- Clyde Lovellette (Terre Haut′e Garfield (1948) before consolidation) former professional basketball player; 3x NBA Champion, 3x All-American, NCAA MOP (1952), 1952 Olympic Gold Medalist.
- Terry Dischinger (Terre Haute Garfield (1959) before consolidation) former professional basketball player; 3x All-American, NBA Rookie of the Year, 1960 Olympic Gold Medalist.
- Frank Hamblen (Terre Haute Garfield (1965) before consolidation) was a professional basketball coach and 7-time NBA champion, Phil Jackson's assistant with Chicago Bulls and Los Angeles Lakers and interim head coach. He is a member of the Indiana Basketball Hall of Fame.
- Ron Greene (Terre Haute Gerstmeyer (1957) before consolidation) is a former college basketball head coach.
- Tommy John (Terre Haute Gerstmeyer (1961) before consolidation) is a former Major League Baseball pitcher. He played for seven different teams from 1963 through 1989 and had 288 MLB victories. He is also known for his recovery and comeback from a revolutionary ulnar collateral ligament surgery, that has since become universally known as Tommy John surgery.
- Steve Newton (Terre Haute Gerstmeyer (1959) before consolidation) is a former college basketball head coach.
- Dexter Shouse (1981), is a former NBA player.
- Chris O'Leary is a National Football League defensive coordinator of Los Angeles Chargers (2026-).

== See also ==
- List of high schools in Indiana
- Terre Haute South Vigo High School
