= Bloomington High School South =

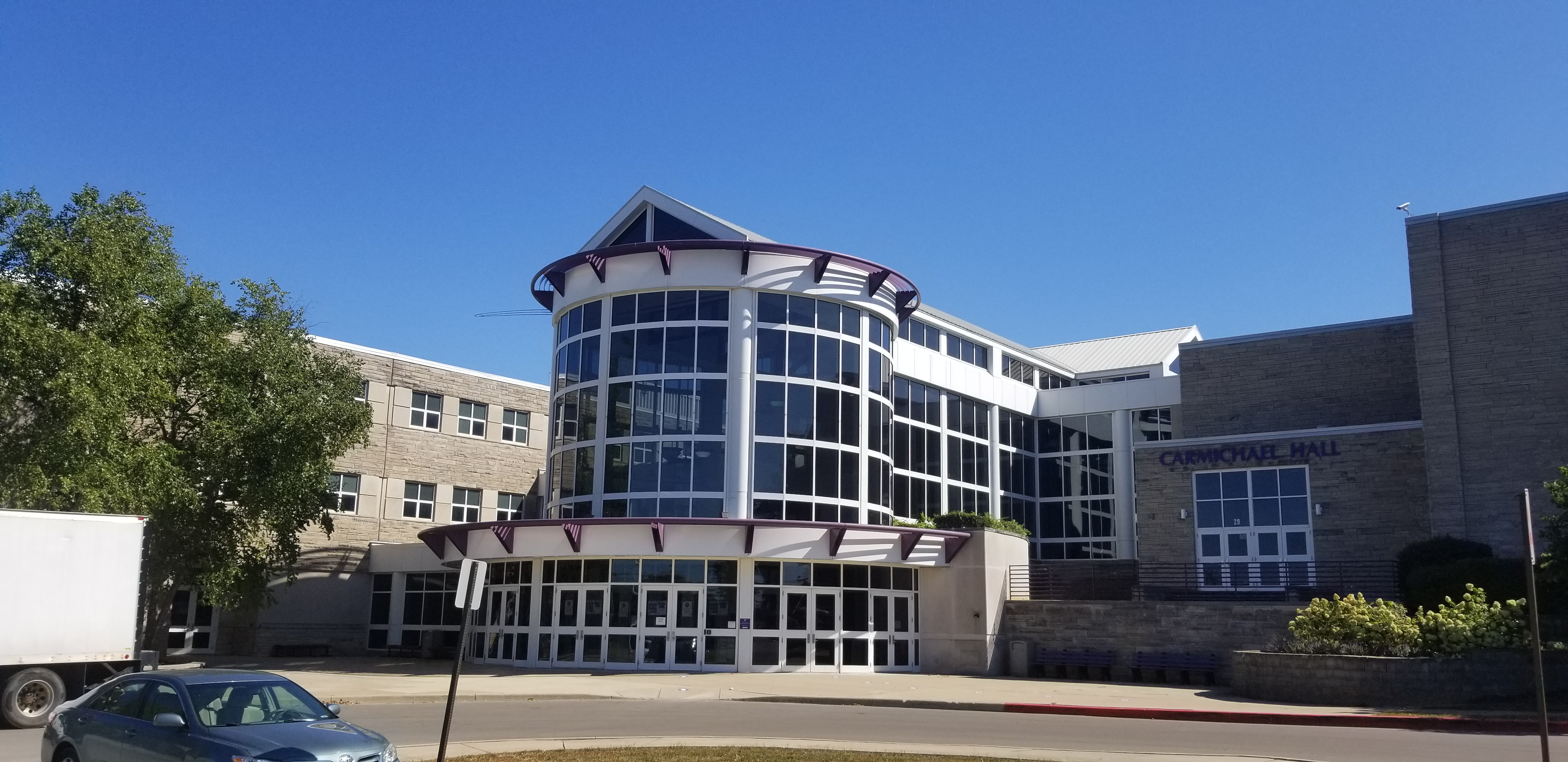

Location
- 1965 S Walnut Street; Bloomington, Indiana 47401; United States; 39.142874°N 86.529374°W

Information
- Other names: BHSS; South
- Former names: Indiana State Seminary; BHS
- Type: Public High school
- School district: Monroe County Community School Corporation
- NCES School ID: 180063000120
- Principal: Mark A. Fletcher
- Teaching staff: 102.75 (on an FTE basis)
- Grades: 9–12
- Enrollment: 1,670 (2023–2024)
- Student to teacher ratio: 16.25
- Colors: Purple and white
- Athletics conference: Conference Indiana
- Nickname: Panthers
- Website: south.mccsc.edu

Bloomington High School South (simply referred to as BHSS or South) is a public high school in Bloomington, Indiana, United States. It is part of the Monroe County Community School Corporation. The school is accredited by the Indiana State Department of Public Instruction and the North Central Association of Colleges and Schools.

== History ==
Bloomington High School South originated as Indiana University Seminary School, or just the State Seminary, in 1820. Indiana State Seminary was a prep school for Indiana University until University High School was built in the 1930s, which allowed it to become Bloomington High School (BHS), a general high school. It was housed, for many years, in a three-story brick building at the current site of Seminary Square Park, and was considered Bloomington's central high school by 1864. As Bloomington grew, BHS slowly evolved and began to house more students. The Gothic yearbook began in 1909 and The Optimist newspaper in 1911. Both were started at BHS and are still in publication as of 2024.

In 1965, a new high school building was built for BHS on South Walnut Street. When BHS vacated Seminary Square, the old building was turned into a middle school called Central Junior High School. On April 6, 1967, an arsonist started a fire in the school's gymnasium. Both the Bloomington Fire Department and the Ellettsville Fire Department were quick to the scene, and over 8,200,000 gallons of water were used in their attempt to extinguish the flames. Inadequate emergency water systems in the area, however, left them unable to save the building, and it collapsed several hours later. The building was subsequently razed, and the property became Seminary Square Park, named after the original Indiana Seminary.

In 1972, University High School and Unionville High School (the closest county high school outside the city of Bloomington) were closed along with Smithville High School. BHS became Bloomington High School South (BHSS), with mascot and school colors (purple and white) reminiscent of those of the former BHS.

Later, the fall of that same year, as a result of the 1968 school consolidation plan which formed the Monroe County Community School Corporation, Bloomington High School North (BHSN) was built with students from the closed University and Unionville High Schools along with some transfer students from BHSS.

The zonal boundary that determines which Bloomington high school a student will attend forms a jagged line that intersects the city. The zoning is such that one student who actually lives north of another, may in fact attend "South", while the other attends "North". This geographic divide was contentious given that the MCCSC school board decided to send the most prominent socioeconomic neighborhood (Hyde Park) to North to reduce in economic/academic inequity. The map can be obtained from the Monroe County Community School Corporation. The two schools have remained contentious rivals in most sporting events since the creation of BHSN in 1972.

== Athletics ==
The Panthers compete in the Conference Indiana, with their main rival being the cross-town Bloomington High School North Cougars. They have won a total of 29 IHSAA Championships, tied for the 5th most in the state.

The 2009 boys basketball team finished with a 26–0 record to become one of the few team in state history to record no losses.

State Championships
Sport	Year(s)
Baseball (1)	1972
Boys Basketball (3)	1919, 2009(4A), 2011(4A)
Football (2)	1993(5A), 1998(5A)
Boys Golf (1)	1939
Girls Golf (1)	1991
Softball (1)	2014 (4A)
Boys Swimming (3)	1970, 1971, 1972
Girls Tennis (1)	1975
Boys Track (1)	1904
Wrestling (15)	1933, 1934, 1939, 1941, 1942, 1943, 1950, 1953, 1957, 1969, 1970, 1971, 1972, 1973, 1978

== Extracurricular activities ==
=== Music ===
The Bloomington South and Bloomington North string orchestras together form the Hoosier Youth Philharmonic, which has performed nationally and internationally, including a concert at Carnegie Hall on March 14, 2012.

South's advanced classical and show choir, Sounds of South, is among the most prestigious in the state. Sounds of South has made the ISSMA mixed choir state finals 28 times, and made second eight times. Sounds of South has won first place in the ISSMA mixed choir championships twice, in 1989 and 2023. Since its founding in 1985 by its current director and conductor, Gwen Witten Upchurch, over 700 students have been in the choir. The choir performs nationally, notably in Orlando, FL; New York City, NY; Chicago, IL; and Nashville, TN.

== Notable alumni ==
- David Shuster, journalist and talk radio host
- Rex Grossman, NFL player
- Hoagy Carmichael, singer, songwriter, and actor
- Meg Cabot, author
- Jordan Hulls, professional basketball player
- Liz Watson, attorney and politician
- Darwin Davis, professional basketball player
- Steve Kinser, former professional racecar driver
- Anthony Leal, collegiate basketball player
- Daniel Larsen, mathematician
- William T. Vollmann, novelist, journalist, war correspondent, short story writer, and essayist
- Arija Bareikis, actress

== See also ==
- List of high schools in Indiana
