= Conference Indiana =

US high school athletic conference

- Founded: 1996
- No. of teams: 6 Class 4A
- Region: 4 Indiana Counties; Bartholomew, Marion, Monroe, Vigo

Locations
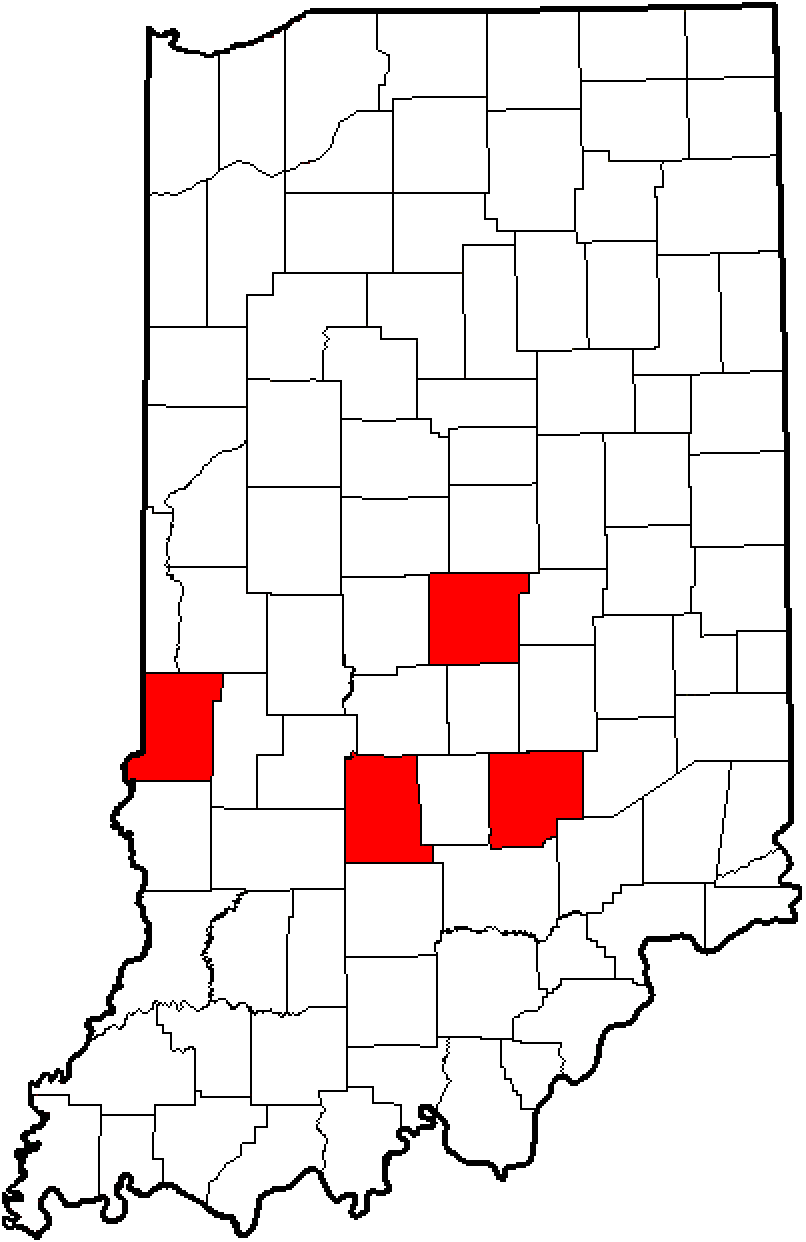

Conference Indiana (CI) is a defunct athletic conference within the Indiana High School Athletic Association. Conference Indiana was initially formed from the union of surviving members of the Central Suburban Conference (CSAC) and the South Central Conference (Indiana) (SCC) after the departure of members to the Metropolitan Interscholastic Conference (MIC).

Original membership included all six non-MIC township schools in Indianapolis (Decatur Central, Pike, Lawrence Central, Franklin Central, Southport, and Perry Meridian high schools). Also included were the four largest non-MIC high schools in south central Indiana at the time of conference formation: Columbus North, Bloomington South, Bloomington North, and Martinsville high schools.

Decatur Central and Martinsville left the conference after the 2005–2006 school year to join the Mid-State Conference, citing travel issues. After Lawrence Central and Pike joined the MIC in 2013, MIC castaways Terre Haute North and South joined as trial football-only members, gaining full membership in 2014. Bloomington North will be leaving the conference to join the Mid State Conference in 2026–27 season. Also Terre Haute North and South will be leaving Conference Indiana after the 2025–2026 season to join the Sagamore Conference. The conference has produced a number of NBA players all drafted in the 1st round including Jared Jeffries in 2002, Sean May in 2006, Courtney Lee in 2008, Jeff Teague in 2009 and Marquis Teague in 2012. Robert Vaden was taken in the 2nd round of the 2009 draft.

== Member schools ==
=== Current members ===
School	Mascot	Colors	Location	Enrollment 24–25	IHSAA Class	IHSAA Class Football	County	Year joined	Previous conference
Bloomington North	Cougars		Bloomington	1,589	4A	5A	53; Monroe	1997	South Central
Bloomington South	Panthers		Bloomington	1,681	4A	5A	53; Monroe	1997	South Central
Columbus North	Bulldogs		Columbus	2,267	4A	6A	03; Bartholomew	1997	South Central
Southport	Cardinals		Indianapolis	2,368	4A	6A	49; Marion	1997	Central Suburban
Terre Haute North^{1}	Patriots		Terre Haute	1,467	4A	5A	84; Vigo	2013	Metropolitan Interscholastic
Terre Haute South^{1}	Braves		Terre Haute	1,609	4A	5A	84; Vigo	2013	Metropolitan Interscholastic

1. Football only members in 2013, all other sports joined in 2014.

=== Former members ===
School	Location	Mascot	Colors	Enrollment	IHSAA Class	# / County	Year joined	Previous conference	Year left	Current Conference
Decatur Central	Indianapolis	Hawks		1,845	5A	49; Marion	1997	Central Suburban	2006	Mid-State
Franklin Central	Indianapolis	Flashes		2,804	6A	Marion	1997	Central Suburban	2018	Hoosier Crossroads Conference
Lawrence Central	Lawrence	Bears		2,290	6A	Marion	1997	Central Suburban	2013	Metropolitan Interscholastic
Martinsville	Martinsville	Artesians		1,435	4A	55; Morgan	1997	South Central	2006	Mid-State
Perry Meridian	Indianapolis	Falcons		2,445	6A	49; Marion	1997	Central Suburban	2018	Mid-State
Pike	Indianapolis	Red Devils		3,295	6A	49; Marion	1997	Central Suburban	2013	Metropolitan Interscholastic

=== Membership timeline ===
Full members Other conference

== State titles ==
=== Bloomington North Cougars (4) ===
- 1977 Wrestling
- 1980 Boys Cross Country
- 1997 Boys Basketball
- 2024 Boys Cross Country
- 2025 Boys Track and Field

=== Bloomington South Panthers (29) ===
Titles won before 1972 were won as Bloomington High School

- 1904 Boys Track & Field
- 1919 Boys Basketball
- 2009 Boys Basketball (4A)
- 2011 Boys Basketball (4A)
- 1933 Wrestling
- 1934 Wrestling
- 1939 Wrestling
- 1941 Wrestling
- 1942 Wrestling
- 1943 Wrestling
- 1950 Wrestling
- 1953 Wrestling
- 1957 Wrestling
- 1969 Wrestling
- 1970 Wrestling
- 1971 Wrestling
- 1972 Wrestling
- 1973 Wrestling
- 1978 Wrestling
- 1972 Baseball
- 1993 Football (5A)
- 1998 Football (5A)
- 1939 Boys Golf
- 1970 Boys Swimming & Diving
- 1971 Boys Swimming & Diving
- 1972 Boys Swimming & Diving
- 1990 Girls Golf
- 2014 Girls Softball (4A)
- 1975 Girls Tennis

=== Columbus North Bulldogs (39) ===
Titles won before 1973 credited as Columbus High School

- 1934 Boys Golf
- 2014 Boys Golf
- 1959 Boys Swimming & Diving
- 1960 Boys Swimming & Diving
- 1961 Boys Swimming & Diving
- 1963 Boys Swimming & Diving
- 1964 Boys Swimming & Diving
- 1965 Boys Swimming & Diving
- 1985 Boys Swimming & Diving
- 1998 Boys Swimming & Diving
- 1999 Boys Swimming & Diving
- 2000 Boys Swimming & Diving
- 2002 Boys Cross-Country
- 2003 Boys Cross-Country
- 2009 Boys Cross-Country
- 2010 Boys Cross-Country
- 2011 Boys Cross-Country
- 2020 Boys Cross-Country
- 1967 Boys Gymnastics (While Columbus HS)
- 1968 Boys Gymnastics (While Columbus HS)
- 1969 Boys Gymnastics (While Columbus HS)
- 1970 Boys Gymnastics (While Columbus HS)
- 1972 Boys Gymnastics (While Columbus HS)
- 1973 Boys Gymnastics
- 1975 Boys Gymnastics
- 1976 Boys Gymnastics
- 1977 Boys Gymnastics
- 1978 Boys Gymnastics
- 1979 Boys Gymnastics
- 1981 Boys Gymnastics
- 1982 Boys Gymnastics
- 2012 Boys Soccer (2A)
- 1973 Girls Gymnastics
- 1974 Girls Gymnastics
- 2016 Girls Gymnastics
- 2015 Girls Basketball (4A)
- 2009 Girls Cross-Country
- 1986 Girls Swimming & Diving
- 2021 Girls Cross-Country

=== Southport Cardinals (10) ===
- 1940 Wrestling
- 1951 Wrestling
- 1954 Wrestling
- 1955 Wrestling
- 1964 Wrestling
- 1970 Boys Cross Country
- 1971 Boys Cross Country
- 1975 Boys Cross Country
- 1980 Girls Basketball
- 1981 Girls Cross Country

=== Terre Haute North Vigo Patriots (2) ===
- 1972 Boys Cross Country
- 1974 Baseball

=== Terre Haute South Vigo Braves (2) ===
- 2001 Girls Tennis
- 2002 Girls Basketball (4A)

^{1} Won while Conference Indiana Member.

== Neighboring Conferences ==
- Blue Chip
- Central Indiana
- Hoosier
- Hoosier Crossroads
- Hoosier Heartland
- Hoosier Hills
- Indiana Crossroads
- Indianapolis Public
- Metropolitan Interscholastic
- Mid-State
- Patoka Lake
- Southern Athletic
- Southern Athletic
- Southwest Indiana Athletic
- Tri-River
- White River
