= Terre Haute South Vigo High School =

Location
- 3737 South 7th Street; Terre Haute, Indiana 47802; United States; 39°25′32″N 87°24′30″W

Information
- Type: Public high school
- Established: 1971
- School district: Vigo County School Corporation
- Superintendent: Christopher Himsel
- Principal: Tim Herrin
- Teaching staff: 108.81 (on a FTE basis)
- Grades: 9–12
- Enrollment: 1,609 (2023–2024)
- Student to teacher ratio: 14.79
- Colors: Red, black, and white
- Athletics: Baseball, bowling (coed), basketball (boys&girls), cross country(boys&girls), flag football(girls), football, golf(boys&girls), indoor track and field(boys&girls), soccer (boys&girls), softball, swimming(boys&girls), tennis(boys&girls), track&field(boys&girls), volleyball(boys&girls), wrestling(boys&girls)
- Athletics conference: Conference Indiana
- Nickname: Braves
- Rivals: Terre Haute North Vigo High School
- Website: Official website

Terre Haute South Vigo High School is a public high school located in Terre Haute, Indiana. It is a part of the Vigo County School Corporation. As the name implies, the school's district covers the southern portion of Terre Haute, as well as most of southern Vigo County, the county in which Terre Haute is located. Its attendance area includes the municipality of Riley.

The school is located at 3737 S 7th St, Terre Haute, Indiana 47802.

== History ==
It was first constructed in 1971 along with Terre Haute North Vigo High School. It is located near the northern edge of Honey Creek Township at 7th and Davis streets. Most of the school is one story. It contains Terre Haute's only planetarium, the Allen Memorial Planetarium.

Terre Haute South Vigo High is a consolidation of Terre Haute William H. Wiley High School (1912–1971) and Honey Creek High School (1926–1971). Honey Creek was involved in earlier consolidations as Blackhawk High (1919–71), Pimento High (1919–61), Prairie Creek High (1917–61), Prairieton High (1924–27) were consolidated into Honey Creek. Wiley itself was the second high school in Terre Haute, opening in 1912. After its founding, North added students from Terre Haute State High (a 'laboratory school' for Indiana State University) in 1978. The 'lab school' continued to educate elementary students through 1992.

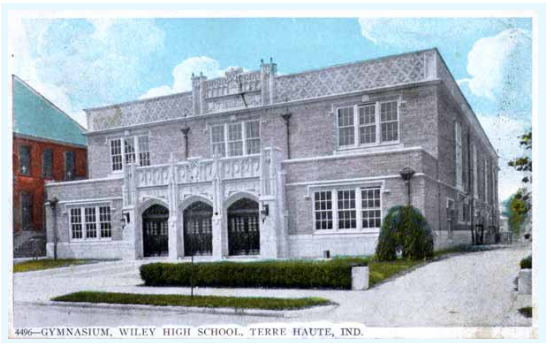

Terre Haute W. Wiley HS Gym (pictured) was the home of Indiana State basketball from 1923 to 1928.

== Demographics ==
The demographic breakdown of the 1,861 students enrolled in 2014-2015 was:

- Male - 53.0%
- Female - 47.0%
- Native American/Alaskan - 0.2%
- Asian/Pacific islanders - 4.0%
- Black - 6.4%
- Hispanic - 3.3%
- White - 78.6%
- Multiracial - 7.5%

44.3% of the students were eligible for free or reduced lunch. For 2014–2015, this was a Title I school.

== Athletics ==
THS has won a state championship in girls tennis (2001) and in girls basketball (2002).

THS has multiple active Fall, Winter, and Spring sports.

== Terre Haute South notable alumni ==
- Armon Bassett, basketball player
- Cam Cameron, football coach
- Jose Pablo Cantillo, actor
- Dylan Schneider, country singer
- Brian Evans, NBA forward
- Tony McGee, NFL tight end
- Craig Porter Jr., basketball player
- A. J. Reed, baseball player
- Apsara Sakbun, Olympian.
- Brandon Sakbun, mayor.
- Jill Bolte Taylor, neuroanatomist
- Danny Etling, NFL quarterback
- Timmy Herrin, baseball player
- Howard Andrew Jones, fantasy author

=== Wiley High School alumni ===
- Junius Bibbs, Negro league infielder
- P. Pete Chalos, longest-serving mayor of Terre Haute
- Ray S. Cline, CIA official
- Norman Cottom, NBA basketball player and later, head basketball coach at Wiley
- Ernest R. Davidson, chemistry professor
- William King Harvey, CIA officer
- Rev. Nicholas Hood Sr., civil rights activist, minister, and politician
- Martin David Jenkins, pioneer in educational psychology
- Alvy Moore, actor
- Abe Silverstein, NASA engineer

== See also ==
- List of high schools in Indiana
