= Bloomington High School North =

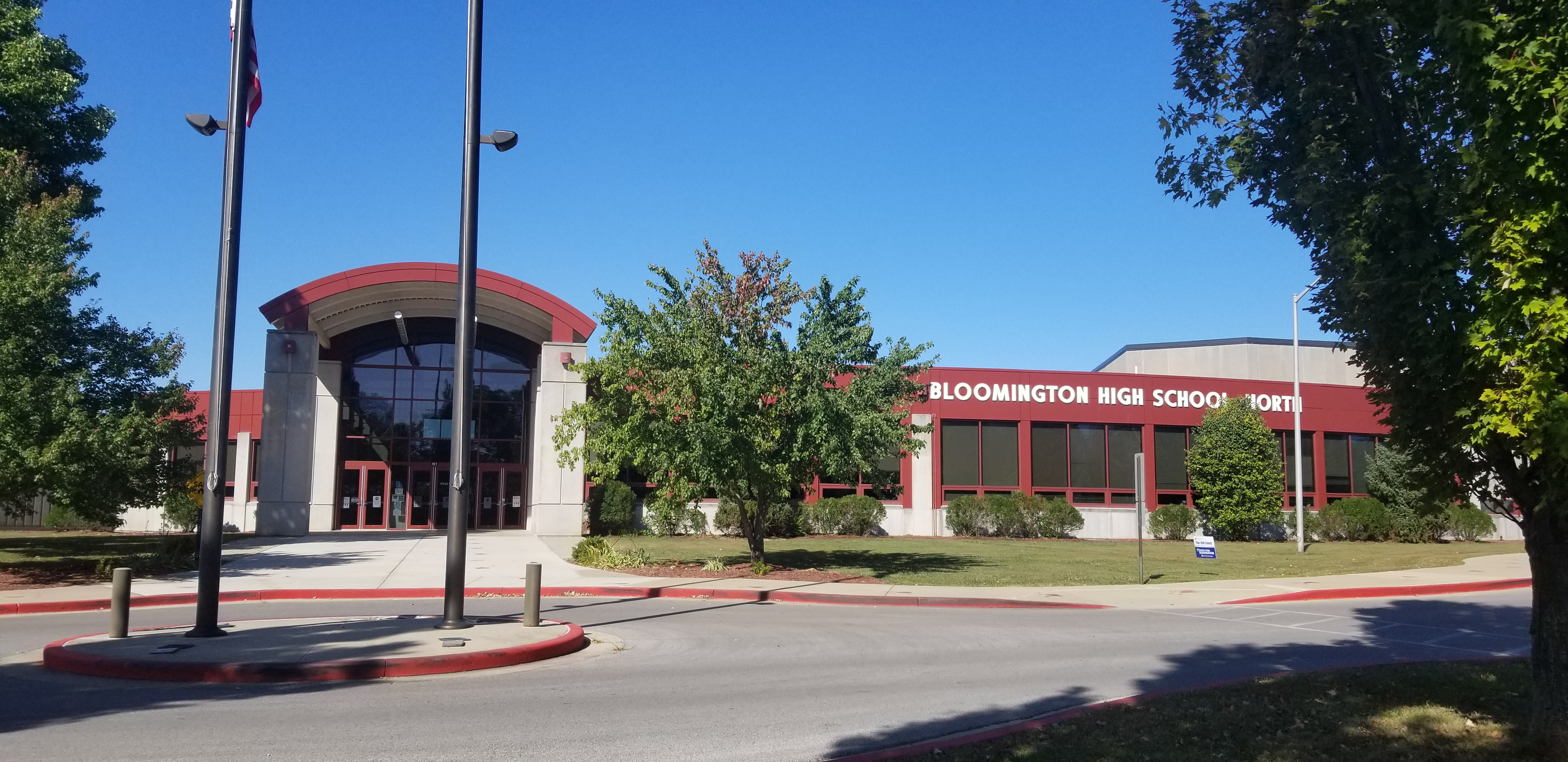

Location
- 3901 N Kinser Pike; Bloomington, Monroe County, Indiana 47404; United States; 39°11′56″N 86°32′57″W

Information
- Type: Public high school
- Established: August 1, 1972
- School district: Monroe County Community Schools
- Principal: Matthew Stark
- Faculty: 99.25 (FTE)
- Grades: 9–12
- Enrollment: 1,562 (2023-2024)
- Student to teacher ratio: 15.74
- Color
- Athletics conference: Conference Indiana
- Team name: Cougars
- Rivals: Bloomington High School South
- Website: north.mccsc.edu

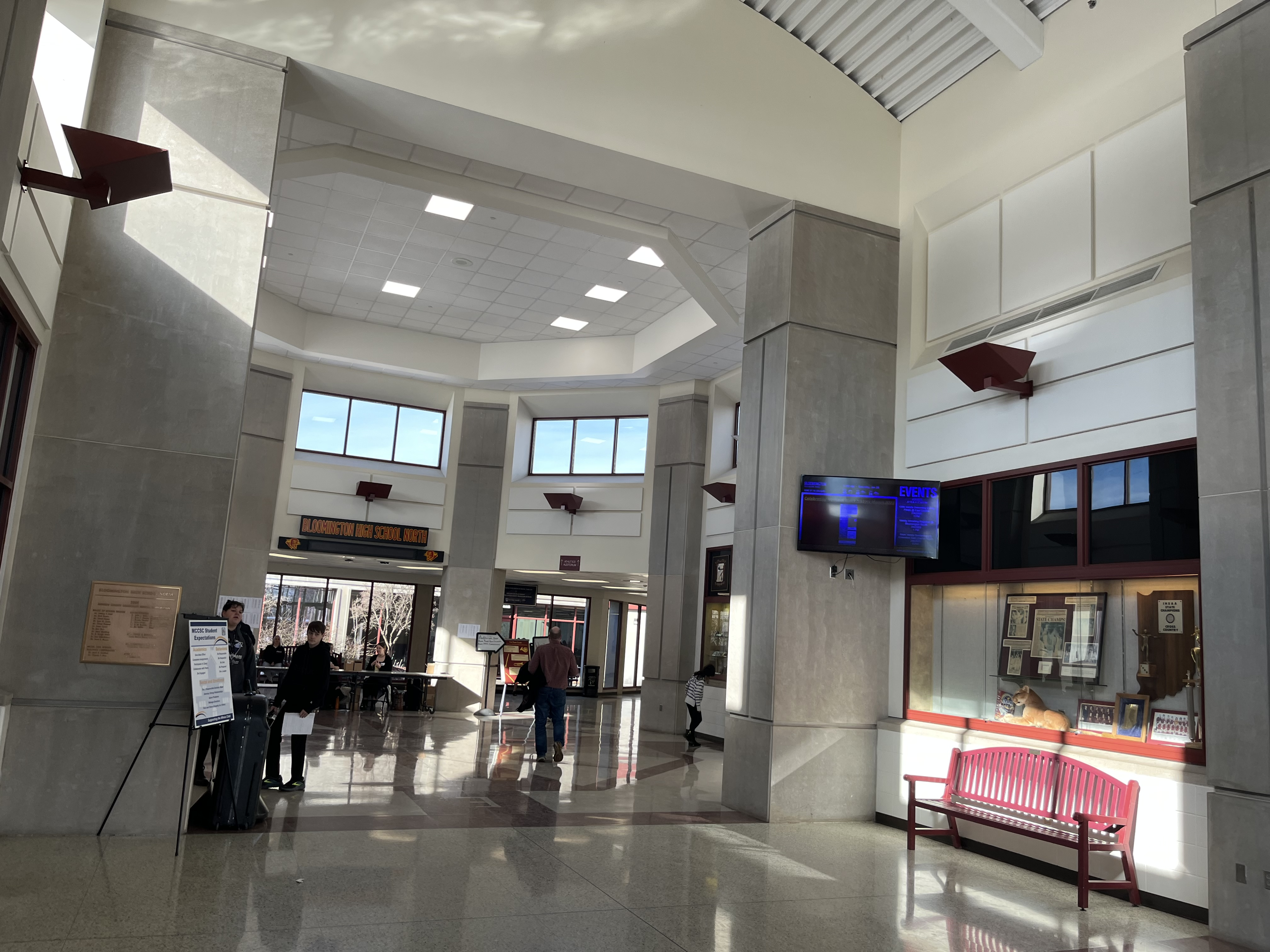
Interior of Bloomington High School North

Bloomington High School North (often referred to as BHSN or simply North) opened in the fall of 1972. It is a comprehensive, four-year, public high school located in the northern part of Bloomington, Indiana, United States. It is part of the Monroe County Community School Corporation. The school is accredited by the Indiana State Department of Public Instruction and the North Central Association of Colleges and Schools.

== Athletics ==
The Cougars compete in the Conference Indiana, with their main rival being the cross-town Bloomington High School South Panthers. They have won five IHSAA championships.

State championships
Sport	Year(s)
Boys' basketball	1997
Boys' cross country	1980, 2024
Boys' Track and Field	2026
Boys' Wrestling	1977

National championships
Sport	Year(s)
Cheerleading	2010

Notes: First Indiana team to win a UCA national title in cheerleading. Coached by Shannon Ritz.

== Extracurricular activities ==
=== Music ===
North's Symphonic Band is among the most prestigious in the state, having placed in the ISSMA concert band state finalists 34 times since the championship's inception in 1985. The band has had two first-place victories, in 1986 and 1987.

Along with Bloomington South's string orchestra, North's band forms the Hoosier Youth Philharmonic (HYP). HYP has performed nationally and internationally, including at Carnegie Hall.

== Notable alumni ==
- Joshua Bell – professional violinist
- Daniel Biss – Illinois House of Representatives member from the 9th district
- Jonathan Biss – professional pianist
- Kueth Duany – former professional basketball player, most recently for the Buffalo Silverbacks of the ABA; also played for several other professional teams including the Fayetteville Patriots of the NBA Development League, Braunschweig and Telekom Baskets Bonnof the German Basketball Bundesliga and the Tampereen Pyrintö of the Finnish Korisliiga
- Jeremiah Gutjahr – former professional soccer player
- Jared Jeffries – former NBA player for the Washington Wizards, New York Knicks, Houston Rockets and Portland Trail Blazers
- Djibril Kante – former professional basketball player (Europe, South America); led Indiana State to two NCAA tournaments
- Pat Knight – scout for the Indiana Pacers; former head coach of the Lamar Cardinals men's basketball team (2011–2014), Texas Tech Red Raiders basketball team (2008–2011), Columbus Cagerz of the United States Basketball League (1998), and Wisconsin Blast of the International Basketball Association; son of Basketball Hall of Fame member and longtime Indiana Hoosiers men's basketball head coach Bob Knight
- Michael Koryta – New York Times best-selling and award-winning suspense novelist
- Sean May – assistant to the director of player development for the North Carolina Tar Heels men's basketball team; previously played for the Charlotte Hornets and Sacramento Kings of the NBA; also played for Fenerbahçe Ülker of the Turkish Basketball Federation, KK Zagreb of the Euroleague, Sutor Basket Montegranaro, formerly of the Italian Lega Basket Serie A, Paris-Levallois Basket, SPO Rouen Basket, and Orléans Loiret Basket of the French Ligue Nationale de Basket
- Terry Stotts – former head coach of the NBA's Atlanta Hawks (2002–2004), Milwaukee Bucks (2005–2007) and Portland Trail Blazers (2012–2021)
- Mario Wuysang – former professional basketball player; considered a legend in Indonesian basketball; has three IBL championships with the Aspac Jakarta and CLS Knights; won the IHSAA Boys Basketball in 1997
- Will Klein – American professional baseball pitcher for the Los Angeles Dodgers of Major League Baseball (MLB)

== See also ==
- List of high schools in Indiana
