= List of DePauw University alumni =

This list of DePauw University alumni includes notable alumni of DePauw University, an American institution of higher education located in Greencastle, Indiana.

== Academia and science ==
- Joseph P. Allen – NASA Space Shuttle astronaut
- Charles A. Beard – author; one of the most influential historians of early 20th century; husband of Mary Ritter Beard
- Mary Ritter Beard – archivist; historian; leader in women's suffrage movement; wife of Charles A. Beard
- Oscar T. Brookins – professor emeritus in the Department of Economics at Northeastern University
- Olivia Castellini – physicist
- David Crocker – philosopher; senior research scholar, School of Public Policy at University of Maryland
- Paul S. Dunkin – writer; professor of library science
- David B. Feldman – psychologist
- Thomas H. Hamilton – former president, State University of New York and University of Hawaii
- Laurin L. Henry – academic
- George W. Hoss – president, Kansas State Normal (now Emporia State University) in Kansas
- Barbara Ibrahim – prominent sociologist of the Arab world; founding director of the John D. Gerhart Center for Philanthropy and Civic Engagement at the American University in Cairo
- Paul Rowland Julian – meteorologist; discovered, with Roland A. Madden, atmospheric phenomena known as Madden–Julian oscillation
- Percy L. Julian – research chemist; pioneer in chemical synthesis of medicinal drugs
- Daniel Trembly MacDougal – botanist, plant biologist
- Margaret Mead – cultural anthropologist, two years, completed B.A. degree at Barnard College
- Major Reuben Webster Millsaps – founder of Millsaps College in Mississippi
- Ferid Murad – recipient of 1998 Nobel Prize in Physiology or Medicine
- J. Robert Nelson (1920–2004), B.A. 1941 – dean of the Vanderbilt University Divinity School, 1957–1960; dean of the Boston University School of Theology, 1965–1985
- Hakkı Ögelman – Turkish physicist; astrophysicist
- William H. Riker – political scientist
- Phillips Robbins – member of the National Academy of Sciences and the Institute of Medicine; has had continuous funding from NIH for over 47 years
- Michael Stuart, B.A. 1979 – sports physician and orthopedic surgeon at the Mayo Clinic
- Winona Hazel Welch (1919–1923) – president of the Indiana Academy of Science, head of botany and bacteriology at DePauw

== Arts and entertainment ==
- Scott Adsit – actor, played Pete Hornberger on television sitcom 30 Rock
- Shibani Bathija – screenwriter
- Alicia Berneche – operatic soprano
- Joseph Brent – mandolinist, composer, and founder of 9 Horses
- Gary Hugh Brown – artist, painter, draftsman, and professor emeritus of Art at the University of California, Santa Barbara
- Pamela Coburn – operatic soprano
- Annie Corley – film and television actress
- David Cryer – singer and Broadway actor, Phantom of the Opera
- Gretchen Cryer – co-creator, I'm Getting My Act Together and Taking It on the Road
- Bill Hayes – stage and television actor, Days of Our Lives
- Jimmy Ibbotson – singer-songwriter and musician, Nitty Gritty Dirt Band
- Sue Keller – ragtime pianist, composer and arranger
- David McMillin – singer-songwriter
- Julie McWhirter – voice actress, known for Hanna-Barbera cartoons, such as Drak Pack and The Smurfs
- Larry D. Nichols – puzzle enthusiast; inventor of Pocket Cube
- Drew Powell – actor
- Kid Quill – recording artist
- Jane Randolph – film actress, known for 1940s films such as Cat People and Jealousy
- Alice Ripley – actress, singer, played Diana in Next to Normal
- Lee Orean Smith (1874–1942) – composer, arranger, music editor, publisher, music teacher, multi-instrumentalist, and conductor
- Albert Pearson Stewart – founder of Purdue Musical Organizations, received honorary doctorate in music from DePauw in 1960
- Pharez Whitted – jazz trumpeter, composer, and producer
- Margaret Jones Wiles – composer, violinist

== Business ==
- Timothy Collins – financier; founder of Ripplewood Holdings; director, Citigroup
- Angie Hicks – founder of Angie's List
- Charles T. Hinde – railroad executive; founder of Hotel del Coronado; shipping executive
- Eli Lilly – founder of Eli Lilly and Company; philanthropist
- John S. McMillin – lawyer and businessman; former president of the Tacoma and Roche Harbor Lime Company
- Mary Meeker – Internet equity research analyst at Morgan Stanley, dubbed "Queen of the Net"
- Jeffrey T. Mezger – president and chief executive officer of KB Home
- Steven Rales – founder of Danaher Corporation and Indian Paintbrush
- Bill Rasmussen – co-founder of ESPN
- Scott Rasmussen – co-founder of ESPN; founder of Rasmussen Reports
- Al Ries – author, marketing expert
- Steve Sanger – former president and chief executive officer of General Mills
- Howard C. Sheperd, Sr. – former president of National City Bank of New York (now Citibank)
- Tommy Ryan – sales development representative at Sentinel Technologies
- Fred C. Tucker – businessperson, real estate broker
- James D. Weddle – managing partner of Edward Jones

== Government and politics ==
- Karen Koning AbuZayd – commissioner-general for U.N. Relief and Works Agency for Palestine Refugees in Near East (2005–10)
- Joseph W. Barr – U.S. secretary of the treasury (1968–1969); chairman, Federal Deposit Insurance Corporation
- Thomas W. Benett – governor of Idaho Territory (1871–1875); served in Indiana State Senate
- Albert Beveridge – U.S. senator from Indiana (1899–1911)
- John Berkshire – justice of the Indiana Supreme Court
- Andrew H. Burke – second governor of North Dakota (1891–1892)
- David L. Carden – U.S. ambassador to Association of Southeast Asian Nations
- Sutemi Chinda – former Japanese ambassador to the United States
- Anna Elizabeth Dickinson – abolitionist, suffragist, first woman to speak before U.S. Congress
- Samuel H. Elrod – governor of South Dakota (1905–07)
- Bob Franks – former U.S. congressman
- Willard Gemmill – justice of the Indiana Supreme Court
- James P. Goodrich – governor of Indiana (1917–21)
- Lee H. Hamilton – co-chair, Iraq Study Group; vice chair, 9/11 Commission; retired United States representative
- Edwin Hammond – justice of the Indiana Supreme Court
- George Howk – justice of the Indiana Supreme Court
- Wayne Hsiung – co-founder, Direct Action Everywhere
- Patricia Ireland – former president, National Organization for Women
- John A. Johnson – general counsel of the Air Force; general counsel of NASA; chief executive officer, COMSAT
- Vernon Jordan Jr. – broker and executive; former president, National Urban League; personal friend and advisor to former U.S. President Bill Clinton
- David E. Lilienthal – public official; writer; businessman; chairman, Tennessee Valley Authority (1941–1946); known as "Mr. TVA"
- John McNaughton – U.S. assistant secretary of defense and U.S. Navy secretary-designate (at time of death)
- Douglas J. Morris – justice of the Indiana Supreme Court
- Jay Holcomb Neff – publisher; 1904–05 mayor of Kansas City, Missouri
- James M. Ogden – 26th Indiana attorney general 1929-33
- E. Jean Nelson Penfield – national president, Kappa Kappa Gamma
- Howard C. Petersen – U.S. assistant secretary of War
- Josh Pitcock – former chief of staff to Vice President Mike Pence
- Dan Quayle – 44th vice president of the United States (under U.S. President George H. W. Bush)
- Halsted Ritter – judge of the United States District Court for the Southern District of Florida (1929–1936)
- Ross Thompson Roberts – judge of the United States District Court for the Western District of Missouri (1982–1987)
- William Morris Sparks – judge of the United States Court of Appeals for the Seventh Circuit (1929–1950)
- Hardress Swaim – judge of the United States Court of Appeals for the Seventh Circuit (1950–1957)
- Elmer Thomas – U.S. senator from Oklahoma (1927–51)
- George R. Throop – chancellor of Washington University (1927–44)
- James E. Watson – U.S. senator from Indiana; Senate Majority Leader (1929–33)
- Guilford M. Wiley – former Wisconsin State Assemblyman
- James Wilkerson – judge of the United States District Court for the Northern District of Illinois (1922–1948)
- Vincent P. Kennedy – physician and politician who served in the Minnesota House of Representatives. Kennedy was later the surgeon of the 5th Minnesota Infantry Regiment during the American Civil War

== Journalism ==
- Bret Baier – host of Special Report with Bret Baier (Fox News Channel)
- Tracey Chang – correspondent, CNBC Asia; 2009 Miss New York USA
- Gil Duran – California opinion editor for The Sacramento Bee
- Stephen F. Hayes – author; columnist, Weekly Standard
- Dave Jorgenson – journalist and TikToker, The Washington Post
- Bernard Kilgore – managing editor of the Wall Street Journal 1941–1965; head of the Dow Jones company
- John McWethy – former correspondent, ABC News
- William N. Oatis – journalist detained 1951–1953 by the Communist government of Czechoslovakia
- Eugene C. Pulliam – newspaper publisher, The Indianapolis Star and The Arizona Republic
- James C. Quayle – newspaper publisher
- Ben C. Solomon – Pulitzer Prize-winning New York Times video journalist
- Jeri Kehn Thompson – radio talk show host; columnist, The American Spectator; wife of Fred Thompson (actor; former U.S. senator from Tennessee (1994–2003); 2008 U.S. presidential candidate)

== Literature ==
- Angus Cameron (1908–2002) – book editor and publisher
- Gretchen Cryer – actress, lyricist, writer
- Patricia Coombs – children's book author and illustrator, Dorrie the Little Witch series
- Matt Dellinger – writer, journalist, wrote the book Interstate 69: The Unfinished History of the Last Great American Highway
- Stephen F. Hayes – senior writer, Weekly Standard; wrote the book Cheney: The Untold Story of America's Most Powerful and Controversial Vice President
- John Jakes – novelist, North and South
- Adam Kennedy – actor, novelist, screenwriter, painter
- Bernard Kilgore – former editor, The Wall Street Journal; turned the publication into one of national significance
- Barbara Kingsolver – contemporary fiction writer; founder of Bellwether Prize for "literature of social change"
- Richard Peck – Newbery Medal-winning author
- Loren Pope – authority on colleges; wrote books Looking Beyond the Ivy League and Colleges That Change Lives
- James B. Stewart – recipient of 1988 Pulitzer Prize for Explanatory Journalism; wrote books including Blood Sport and DisneyWar
- Blanche Stillson – author and artist
- Minnetta Theodora Taylor (1860–1911) – wrote the lyrics to the National Suffrage Anthem

== Military ==
- Harvey Weir Cook – fighter ace in World War I; leading figure in the development of aviation in the United States
- Nathan Kimball – Union general during Civil War
- Sergeant Henry Nash – member of Theodore Roosevelt's Rough Riders
- General David M. Shoup – commandant of the Marine Corps; recipient of Medal of Honor (World War II)
- William F. Spurgin – U.S. Army brigadier general, attended DePauw 1854–1857, received honorary degree of Master of Arts in 1890
- Alexander Vraciu – flying ace in World War II

== Religion ==
- Albertus T. Briggs – Methodist minister
- Luella F. McWhirter – president, Indiana State Woman's Christian Temperance Union
- Eunice Blanchard Poethig – Presbyterian minister

== Sports ==
- Buzzie Bavasi – former general manager, Los Angeles Dodgers, California Angels and San Diego Padres
- Rob Boras – NFL assistant coach
- Brad Brownell – head men's basketball coach, Clemson University
- Noah Droddy – distance runner
- Dave Finzer – punter, Chicago Bears and Seattle Seahawks
- Ford C. Frick – Major League Baseball commissioner (1951–1965)
- Bill Rasmussen – co-founder of ESPN
- Scott Rasmussen – co-founder of ESPN; founder of Rasmussen Reports
- Joe Schoen – NFL executive, general manager of the New York Giants
- Wilfred Smith – National Football League player
- Brad Stevens – general manager, Boston Celtics
- Dick Tomey – college football coach

== See also ==
- List of people from Indiana
