= Deaths in January 1983 =

The following is a list of notable deaths in January 1983.

Entries for each day are listed alphabetically by surname. A typical entry lists information in the following sequence:

- Name, age, country of citizenship at birth, subsequent country of citizenship (if applicable), reason for notability, cause of death (if known), and reference.

== January 1983 ==
=== 2 ===
- Dick Emery, 67, English comedian and comic actor, eponymous star of the long-running television show The Dick Emery Show from 1963 until 1981, cardiorespiratory failure
- Harriet Parsons, 76, American film producer, director, actress, and magazine writer

=== 3 ===
- Clément Duhour, 71, French film director, producer, actor, singer, and Olympic shot putter, death attributed to unspecified "natural causes"
- Doug Wright, 65, Canadian cartoonist, eponymous creator of the comic strip Doug Wright's Family

=== 4 ===
- Donald Bruce Kaufman, 60, American home builder and entrepreneur, co-founder of Kaufman & Broad, plane crash.

=== 7 ===
- Fred Church, 93, American actor of the silent era

=== 8 ===
- Tom McCall, 69, American politician, journalist, environmentalist, and producer of documentary films, he served as the governor of Oregon from 1967 until 1975,prostate cancer

=== 9 ===
- Merrill Blosser, 90, American cartoonist, creator of the long-running comic strip Freckles and His Friends

=== 10 ===
- Roy DeMeo, 42, American mobster, member of the Gambino crime family and head of his own "DeMeo crew" which was supposedly responsible for up to 200 murders, killed with multiple shots in the head, possibly by members of his own crew His dead body was discovered on January 20.

=== 11 ===
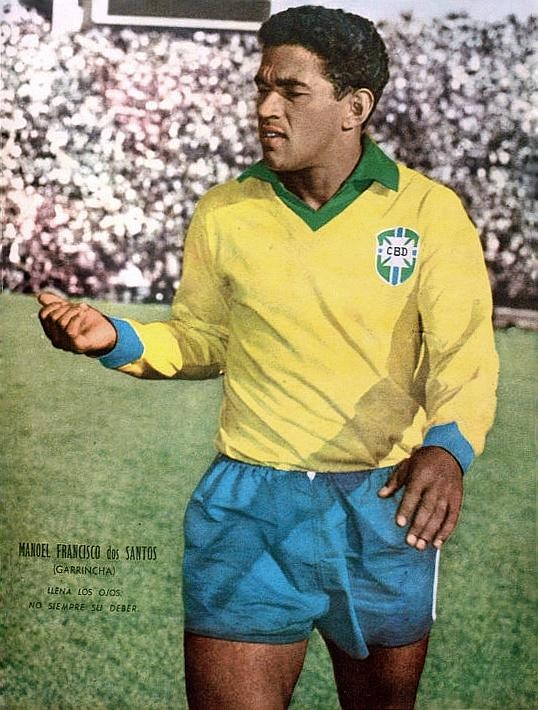
Garrincha

- Gerhard Barkhorn, 63, German military aviator, wing commander in the Luftwaffe and high-ranking officer in the German Air Force, considered the second most successful fighter pilot in aviation history, one of the only two fighter aces who exceeded the number of 300 claimed victories, fatally injured and comatose since January 6, due to a car accident

=== 12 ===
- Tex Antoine, 59, American weatherman and radio announcer
- Nikolai Podgorny, 79, Soviet politician, he served as the head of state of the Soviet Union from 1965 until 1977, holding the title of the Chairman of the Presidium of the Supreme Soviet, he was deposed in 1977 by a unanimous vote taken by the Central Committee, cancer

=== 13 ===
- David M. Shoup, 78, general of the United States Marine Corps, Commandant of the Marine Corps from 1960 until 1963, prominent critic of the Vietnam War and opposed to strategies associated with troop escalation , death due to an unspecified long-term "illness"
- Arthur Space, 74, American actor

=== 15 ===
- Meyer Lansky, 80, American organized crime figure, he was instrumental in the development of the National Crime Syndicate in the United States, lung cancer
- Shepperd Strudwick, 75, American actor, cancer

=== 16 ===
- Doodles Weaver, 71, American character actor, comedian, musician, and television host, suicide by firearm

=== 18 ===
- Arturo Umberto Illia, 82, Argentine politician, he served as the president of Argentina from 1963 until 1966, when he was deposed by the Argentine Revolution

=== 19 ===
- Robert Carson, 73, American screenwriter, novelist, and short story writer, he had won an Academy Award for Best Story for co-writing the screenplay of A Star Is Born (1937)
- Don Costa, 57, American record producer and conductor, heart attack cirrhosis of the liver, died while hospitalised

=== 20 ===
- Allen Dorfman, American criminal shot dead.
- Garrincha, 49, Brazilian professional footballer, considered one of the greatest dribblers in the sport,cirrhosis of the liver, died while incapacitated in an alcoholic coma
- Yvonne Odic, 92, French mechanical engineer

=== 24 ===
- Carmen Clemente Travieso, 82, Venezuelan journalist and women's rights activist, one of the early female members of the Communist Party of Venezuela
- George Cukor, 83, American film director and producer, specialist in comedy films and literary adaptations, heart attack
- Liv Uchermann Selmer, 90, Norwegian actress, she debuted at the National Theatre in Oslo in 1913 as the wicked fairy Mørkøie in the Norwegian translation of Zachris Topelius's play Sleeping Beauty (Finnish: Prinsessa Ruusunen).

=== 26 ===
- Bear Bryant, 69, American college football player and coach, head coach of the Alabama Crimson Tide from 1958 until 1982, heart attack

=== 27 ===
- Georges Bidault, 83, French politician and member of the French Resistance, he served as the prime minister of France for a few months in 1946, and again from 1949 until 1950.stroke
- Pat Bilon, 35, American actor and district director for the organization Little People of America, complications from a blood infection
- Robert Christian, 43, American actor, cancerous complications of AIDS
- Louis de Funès, 68, French comedy actor

=== 28 ===
- Frank Chiaramonte, 40, American comic book artist, he served as an inker for both DC Comics and Marvel Comics from 1972 until 1982, credited with inking several of the early stories featuring Werewolf by Night, Ghost Rider, Man-Thing, Iron Fist, and Killraven
- Kendall Clark, 70, American actor
- Frank Forde, 92, Australian politician, he briefly served as the prime minister of Australia in July 1945, scheduling the 1945 Australian Labor Party leadership election to choose a new party leader and prime minister
- Billy Fury, 42, English musician and actor, he was an early star of British rock and roll and he spent 332 weeks on the UK singles chart,heart attack, with his heart damaged in the past by rheumatic fever

=== 29 ===
- Stuart H. Ingersoll, 84, vice admiral of the United States Navy, commander-in-chief of the United States Seventh Fleet, President of the Naval War College, and Commandant of Midshipmen at the United States Naval Academy

== Sources ==
- Alexander, Joseph H. (1993), Across the Reef: The Marine Assault of Tarawa, Ann Arbor, Michigan: University of Michigan Library, ISBN 978-1-4819-9936-6
- Anderson, David L. (2000), The Human Tradition in the Vietnam Era, Lanham, Maryland: Rowman & Littlefield, ISBN 978-0-8420-2763-2
- Barbas, Bernd (2014). Das vergessene As — Der Jagdflieger Gerhard Barkhorn [The Forgotten Ace — The Fighter Pilot Gerhard Barkhorn] (in German and English). Bad Zwischenahn, Germany: Luftfahrtverlag-Start. ISBN 978-3-941437-22-7.
- Daniels, Robert Vincent (1998). Russia's Transformation: Snapshots of a Crumbling System. Rowman & Littlefield. ISBN 0-8476-8709-0.
- Law, David A. (1975). Russian Civilization. Ardent Media. ISBN 0-8422-0529-2.
- Mendelevich, Pablo (2010). El Final (in Spanish). Buenos Aires: Ediciones B. ISBN 978-987-627-166-0.
- Mustain, Gene; Capeci, Jerry (1992). Murder Machine: A True Story of Murder, Madness, and the Mafia. New York: Onyx. ISBN 9780091941116.
- "Carmen Clemente Travieso". Prensa Inamujer (in Spanish). Caracas, Venezuela: Government of Venezuela. July 24, 2015. Archived from the original on October 18, 2017.
- Scherzer, Veit (2007). Die Ritterkreuzträger 1939–1945 Die Inhaber des Ritterkreuzes des Eisernen Kreuzes 1939 von Heer, Luftwaffe, Kriegsmarine, Waffen-SS, Volkssturm sowie mit Deutschland verbündeter Streitkräfte nach den Unterlagen des Bundesarchives [The Knight's Cross Bearers 1939–1945 The Holders of the Knight's Cross of the Iron Cross 1939 by Army, Air Force, Navy, Waffen-SS, Volkssturm and Allied Forces with Germany According to the Documents of the Federal Archives] (in German). Jena, Germany: Scherzers Militaer-Verlag. ISBN 978-3-938845-17-2.
- Sobel, Robert (1978). Biographical directory of the governors of the United States, 1789-1978, Vol. III. Meckler Books. ISBN 9780930466008.
- Tucker, Spencer (2011), The Encyclopedia of the Vietnam War: A Political, Social, and Military History, Santa Barbara, California: ABC-CLIO, ISBN 978-1-85109-960-3
- Zabecki, David T., ed. (2014). Germany at War: 400 Years of Military History. Santa Barbara, California: ABC-Clio. ISBN 978-1-59884-980-6.
