= Albertus Theodore Briggs =

Methodist Episcopal minister (1862–1937)

Albertus T. Briggs
- Born: March 3, 1862; Findlay, Ohio
- Died: September 12, 1937 (aged 75); Indianapolis, Indiana
- Resting place: Forest Hill Cemetery; Greencastle, Indiana, U.S.
- Education: DePauw University
- Occupation: Minister
- Spouse: Lenore Alleman (1865-1943)
- Children: Genevieve Briggs (1894-1994); Margaret Briggs (1895-1991); Mildred Briggs (1897-1970); Ruth Lenore Briggs (1904-1958); Mary Elizabeth Briggs (1909-2014)

Albertus Theodore Briggs (March 3, 1862 – September 12, 1937) was a Methodist Episcopal minister for more than 40 years, and a District Superintendent in the Hammond and Greencastle districts in Indiana. For years, he was the President of the Preachers' Aid Society, now the United Methodist Foundation of Indiana.

== Early life and education ==
He was the second of six children, born in Findlay, Ohio, to William Henry Harrison Briggs and Catherine (Harmel) Briggs. William was raised as a farmer, but became a carpenter and contractor, building the Methodist Church and multiple houses in Geneva, Indiana. He served in the Union Army during the Civil War. His father was Andrew Briggs, a merchant in Rockville, Ohio and a farmer in Hancock County, Ohio. William's grandfather, John Briggs, served in the Revolution and the War of 1812.

A.T. Briggs attended the Fort Wayne Methodist College and in 1890 graduated from DePauw University, located in Greencastle, Indiana. At DePauw, he was a member of the Beta Theta Pi fraternity and one of the four charter members of the DePauw chapter of Phi Beta Kappa. He earned an A.M. in 1893, and an honorary D.D. degree in 1910, 20 years after his initial graduation.

== Career ==
He joined the Northwest Indiana Conference of the Methodist Episcopal Church in 1889. He served churches in this conference for 40 years.

He was a student pastor at Simpson M.E. Church in Fort Wayne, Indiana while affiliated with the Fort Wayne College. He was also a student pastor at Carpentersville, Indiana and Knightsville, Indiana while attending DePauw.

In 1890, he addressed the Terre Haute Total Abstinence Club at the Universalist Church in Terre Haute. While serving as an associate paster at Centenary Church in Terre Haute in the early 1890s, he is credited with being the founder of the Maple Avenue Church, also in Terre Haute.

In 1891, he was appointed a delegate to attend an Epworth League Convention in Greencastle. He read a paper entitled "A Model Month of a Model League."

In 1911, as district Superintendent, he dedicated the new Trinity Methodist Church in Kentland, along with DePauw President Francis John McConnell. Briggs was President of the Preachers Aid Society for 12 or 14 years and was active in the Battle Ground Camp Meetings of the Northwest Indiana Conference. He was a General Delegate to the 1912 General Conference in Minneapolis

In May 1917, he was a founder and one of the directors of the Wesley Foundation at Purdue University.

In 1927, he gave the report for the Greencastle District at the meeting of the Northwest Indiana Conference of the Methodist Episcopal Church in Gary, Indiana.

On December 1, 1929, along with the Rev. C. Howard Taylor, Dr. G. Bromley Oxnam, and Bishop Edgar Blake, he participated in the dedication of the Greencastle Methodist Episcopal Church, later renamed the Gobin Memorial Church.

He retired in 1931 to give more younger ministers the chance to serve. He still served part-time where needed, including at acting pastor in Thornton, Lentland, Attica, and at the Gobin Memorial Church in Greencastle, Indiana in 1935.

Briggs served the following churches during his career:

- Centenary Church, Terre Haute, Indiana, associate pastor (1890–1892?)
- Grace Church, Rochester, Indiana (1892–1894)
- First Methodist Episcopal Church, Kentland, Indiana (1894–1896)
- Methodist Episcopal Church, Monticello, Indiana (1896–1901)
- Methodist Episcopal Church, Attica, Indiana (1902–c.1907)
- Methodist Episcopal Church, Hammond, Indiana (c.1907–1908)
- Hammond District Superintendent based in Valparaiso, Indiana (1908–1914)
- Methodist Episcopal Church, West Lafayette, Indiana (1914–1917)
- First Methodist Church, LaPorte, Indiana (1917–1925)
- Greencastle District Superintendent based in Greencastle, Indiana (1925–1931)

== Personal life ==
Briggs met Lenore Alleman while they were in school at the Fort Wayne Methodist Academy. They both attended DePauw and married in Celina, Ohio on June 14, 1893. She was born in 1867 in Argos, Indiana, the daughter of Jacob C. Alleman and Mary Ann Lowry. Her great-grandfather, John Alleman was from Pennsylvania and served in the Revolution. She earned a Ph B. and an A.M. from DePauw University in 1891 and 1893. She was a member of the Kappa Alpha Theta sorority and treasurer of the Y.M.C.A. She served as a high school principal in Waterloo, Indiana in 1891 and in Celina, Ohio in 1892. They had five daughters; Genevieve, Margaret, Mildred, Ruth Lenore, and Mary Elizabeth Briggs, all of whom went to college.

In Attica, they lived on Jackson Street. While in Valparaiso, they lived in a brick house on Franklin Street. In La Porte, they lived at 815 Monroe Street. In Greencastle, the Briggs house was 712 E. Seminary Street.

In 1920, they travelled by train to Yellowstone National Park. In 1921, they drove to the East Coast.

He died at the Methodist Hospital in Indianapolis, and his funeral was held at the Gobin Memorial Church in Greencastle. Briggs and his wife are buried in the Forest Hill Cemetery in Greencastle.

== Genealogy ==
- Albertus Theodore Briggs, son of
  - William H. H. Briggs (1836–1909), son of
    - Andrew Briggs (1786–1863), son of
    - John Briggs (1736–1802)

== See also ==
- List of DePauw University alumni
- List of people from Indiana
- List of people from Ohio
