= Pat E. Taylor =

American choreographer

Pat E. Taylor is a choreographer and the artistic director of JazzAntiqua Dance & Music Ensemble, a jazz dance company focusing on the African American roots of jazz dance and music. Taylor founded her company in 1993 in Los Angeles, California. JazzAntiqua has performed across the U.S. at venues including Jacob's Pillow in Massachusetts, Peridance in New York City, the Hollywood Bowl, and the Nate Holden Performing Arts Center in Los Angeles. Taylor and her company have received grants from organizations including the National Endowment for the Arts, California Arts Council, Black Arts Futures Fund, California Humanities, and Los Angeles Contemporary Exhibitions. Taylor has served as artist-in-residence in universities across the U.S., including Southern Methodist University, the Peabody Institute of the Johns Hopkins University, Loyola Marymount University, and Sacramento State. Taylor holds an MFA from Goddard College in interdisciplinary arts with a jazz focus and is on the faculty at the Gloria Kaufman School of Dance at the University of Southern California.

== Early life ==
Taylor was born in Los Angeles to a family with Louisiana heritage. Taylor's grandfather was a jazz drummer in the 1930s and 40s. Her early dance training included ballet, jazz, modern, and tap at local parks. As a teen, she studied with the R'Wanda Lewis Afro-American Dance Company, which broadened her perspective on dance. There she learned West African dances and rhythms, the Katherine Dunham Technique, and the history of jazz dance. According to dance writer Slayton, this experience taught her about a Black dance aesthetic and its African roots. Taylor went on to major in dance at UCLA, then attended the Alvin Ailey School in New York City.

Taylor was offered a job teaching jazz dance in Europe, and spent seven years there, mainly in Helsinki, Finland, and Stockholm, Sweden. She also traveled across Europe, teaching and choreographing. Taylor noted that jazz music and dance were highly respected in Europe, and began to develop her approach that specifically linked her choreography to jazz music.

== JazzAntiqua Dance & Music Ensemble ==
When Taylor returned to Los Angeles from Europe in 1993, she founded her company, JazzAntiqua Dance & Music Ensemble. The company includes dancers, musicians, as well as actors, singers, and spoken-word artists who work within the jazz idiom. The dances they perform center around the African American experience throughout history and today.

Taylor's first work for her company was based upon the paintings of Romare Bearden, an African American artist who grew up within the milieu of the Harlem Renaissance in New York City. She collaborated with a jazz music group called Black/Note, directed by Marcus Shelby, to create a piece for a dance showcase of Los Angeles artists. After that first collaboration, the same musicians and dancers continued working together. The short piece inspired by Bearden later became a full-evening work, Midtown Sunset (1994). Taylor continues to work with live musicians; the company performs to both original, contemporary jazz compositions and to the music of twentieth-century jazz composers such as Duke Ellington, Miles Davis, and John Coltrane. Taylor's style shows a connection to its African American origins, while also incorporating elements of modern dance, codified jazz, and ballet. Movement vocabulary includes African-based references such as bent knees, a forward inclined torso, propulsive walks, body part isolations, and sudden releases in the torso. Other elements derive from ballet, such as elongated body lines or turns on one foot, but are performed with a jazz sensibility, connecting to the rhythm and musical aesthetic of the dance.

In addition to performing in venues across the country, JazzAntiqua has performed extensively in Southern California, including at the Nate Holden Performing Arts Center, the Anson Ford Amphitheatre, the Morgan-Wixson Theatre. and the Marina Del Rey Summer Concert Series.

== Choreography ==
Taylor's choreography has included a range of subject matter, mainly within the realm of African American themes. Song in a Strange Land (2014) is inspired by a biblical psalm where Babylonians captured Jews and brought them to a foreign land as slaves. It also references memories of African slavery in the New World, revealing the struggle to stay mentally and spiritually grounded among strangers. Performed to live jazz music, the work has twelve sections and includes narration which ties the sections together; it draws a parallel between slavery in Babylonia, slavery in the U.S., and current injustices faced by African American communities.

A second dance, 1960 What? (2018) is based upon a protest song by jazz musician Gregory Porter. It gives musical and movement expression to the lyrics of the song, which describe a young man wrongfully shot by the police. The dance has a propulsive rhythm and a clear sense of community amongst the dancers. One section consists of a series of unique solos expressing a range of styles, including codified jazz techniques, hip-hop dance, modern dance, ballet, African-American vernacular dance, and elements of West African dance.

A third dance, Home, (2024) focuses on the history and legacy of jazz dance as a reflection of the African American cultural tradition. It is performed to music by the Jazz at Lincoln Center Orchestra with Winton Marsalis, and features ten company dancers. One part of the work showcases storyteller/dancer Jahanna Blunt, who uses traditional West African dance to show the diasporic connection to contemporary expressions of jazz dance.

== Educator ==
Taylor is currently on the faculty at USC Kaufman School of Dance She has been a guest artist at universities across the United States, including the Peabody Conservatory at Johns Hopkins University in Maryland, Southern Methodist University in Texas, and Salve Regina University. Taylor served as a master teacher at the Jazz Dance Conference West in 2024 & 2026. From 1993 to 2017, Taylor served as Dance Department Chair at the Crossroads School for Arts & Sciences in Santa Monica, California. Taylor also serves as a Cultural Consultant to Dance & Dialogue, a non-profit dedicated to multigenerational educational dance programming throughout Southern California.

== Awards, honors, and grants ==
Taylor and her company have received various honors including 2022 funding from the National Endowment for the Arts to support the company and its operations. She received five different grants from 2017 to 2022 from The California Arts Council. JazzAntiqua received a grant in 2020 from the Black Art Futures Fund. Taylor has also received funding from the Los Angeles Dept. of Cultural Affairs.

Taylor's first award was an artist project grant from the Los Angeles Contemporary Exhibitions (LACE) organization for her 1994 project Midtown Sunset. In 2018, Taylor won a California Humanities grant for her project The Community Salon: HOME, which involved conversations with a variety of artists on the theme of "home," as well as a new artistic work for the company based on that theme. Taylor has won the Dance & Dialogue Community Contributions Award as well as the California Association of Health, Physical Education, Recreations, and Dance Community Spirit Award. JazzAntiqua won a grant from the Los Angeles Department of Cultural Affairs. She received the Brody Arts Fund Choreography Fellowship and the Francis E. Williams Artists' Grant.

Her choreography has been performed at venues such as Jacob's Pillow in Massachusetts, and at the Hollywood Bowl as part of the Playboy Jazz Festival. Her work has been presented in Sweden; Brazil; Minneapolis, Minnesota; New York City; the Los Angeles County Museum of Art; and the Cerritos Center for the Performing Arts, among others. Taylor also received a grant from the Center for Cultural Innovation.
