= Laura White =

Laura White may refer to:

- Laura White (actress) (born 1995), English actress
- Laura White (singer) (born 1987), English singer
- Laura Lyon White (1839–1916), American suffragist and environmentalist
- Laura Rosamond White (1844–1922), American author and editor
- Laura Rogers White (1852–1929), American suffragist and architect
- Laura Weber White (born 1971), American musician

== See also ==
- Lori White, American academic, president of DePauw University in 2020
