= Glorya Kaufman =

American philanthropist (1930–2025)

- Born: Glorya Pinkis; January 23, 1930; Detroit, Michigan, U.S.
- Died: August 5, 2025 (aged 95)
- Occupation: Philanthropist
- Spouse: Donald Bruce Kaufman (m. 1954; died 1983)
- Children: 4

Glorya Kaufman (née Pinkis; January 23, 1930 – August 5, 2025) was an American philanthropist.

== Early life ==
Glorya Pinkis was born in 1930 to a Jewish family in Detroit, Michigan and grew up during the Great Depression. Her father, Samuel Pinkis, worked as a production manager for Automotive News and her mother, Eva, volunteered for Jewish charities. Her parents could not afford dancing lessons for her.

== Philanthropy ==
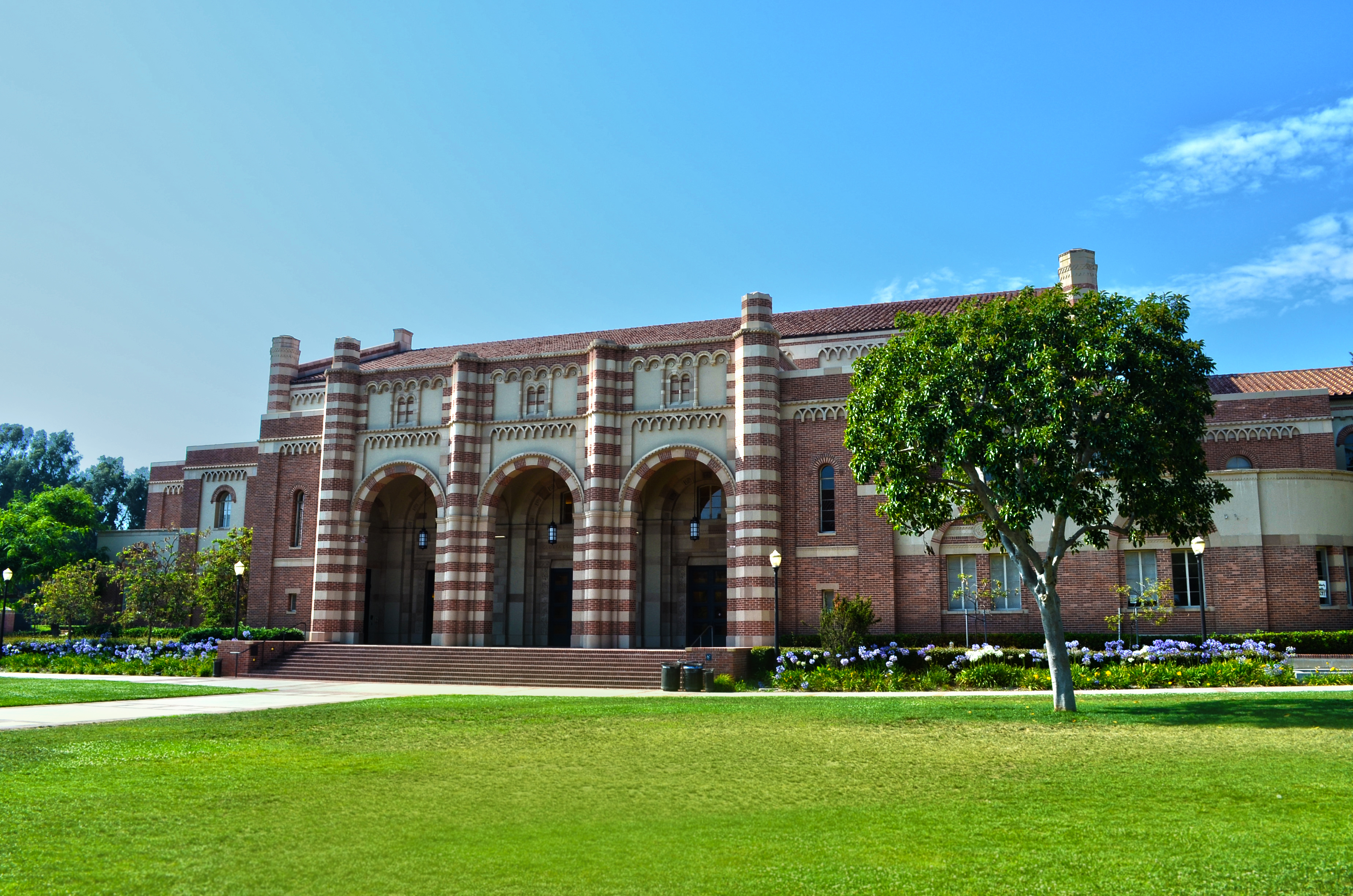
Glorya Kaufman Hall at UCLA

In 1994, Kaufman made a donation for the construction of the 10,040-square-foot (933 m^{2}) Donald Bruce Kaufman branch of the Los Angeles Public Library in Brentwood, Los Angeles.

In 1999, Kaufman donated US$18 million to the University of California, Los Angeles, which named Glorya Kaufman Hall in her honor. However, she admitted to being disappointed in the way UCLA handled her donation.

In 2009, Kaufman donated US$20 million to the Los Angeles Music Center to establish the Glorya Kaufman Presents Dance series. She also donated millions to the Alvin Ailey American Dance Theater and the Juilliard School in New York City. In 2011, she donated several millions to the University of Southern California (USC) for the establishment of the Glorya Kaufman School of Dance, which enrolled its first cohort of BFA majors in 2015, and the construction of the Glorya Kaufman International Dance Center. In 2012, she joined the board of trustees at USC, where she received an honorary doctorate in 2013.

She was a major supporter of the Wende in Culver City, contributing capital and endowment funding for the creation of the Wende Museum's Community Center, intended to provide free community arts and education programs in perpetuity.

== Personal life and death ==
In 1954, Kaufman married Donald Bruce Kaufman, who with Eli Broad co-founded Kaufman & Broad, now known as KB Home (NYSE: KBH), in 1957. Broad's wife, Edythe Lawson, is Kaufman's first cousin. They had four children. Donald and his son-in-law, Eyal Horwitz, both died in a plane crash in 1983; afterward Glorya turned to charity work. She raised her family in a Brentwood ranch house.

Kaufman lived in a US$18.2 million Italian-style villa in Beverly Hills, California with Erté tables and Louis Icart prints. She died on August 5, 2025, at the age of 95.
