= Travieso =

Travieso is a surname. Notable people with the surname include:

- Travieso (footballer) (1900–1975), Spanish football forward
- Carmelo Travieso (born 1975), Puerto Rican basketball player
- Carmen Clemente Travieso (1900–1983), Venezuelan journalist and women's rights activist
- Frank Travieso (born 1980), Cuban-born American cyclist
- Héctor Travieso (1952–2025), Cuban actor, comedian, and television host
- Martín Travieso (1882–1971), Puerto Rican politician, senator, lawyer, and judge
- Vicente Álvarez Travieso (1705–1779), Spanish judge and politician
