= David McMillin =

American musician

David McMillin (born May 11, 1984, in Columbus, Indiana) is an American singer-songwriter. McMillin began writing songs when he was in high school in Southern Indiana. He eventually went to college at DePauw University and majored in Creative Writing.

McMillin's style has been described as alternative country and folk-rock. He is influenced by Bob Dylan, John Mellencamp, Ryan Adams, and Johnny Cash.

McMillin was named Best Folk, Country, or Americana Group by the Chicago Reader on June 26, 2008.

David was recently selected as a finalist in the 2014 The Grassy Hill Kerrville New Folk Competition.

== Touring ==
McMillin was invited by Shelby Lynne to open her entire 2008 North American Tour. The tour was scheduled to start in Nashville, Tennessee on March 28, 2008, and end in San Diego, California. The tour had planned stops at nearly every major city in the country. McMillin has recently toured with Martin Sexton, Matt Nathanson, Emerson Hart, Third Eye Blind, Goo Goo Dolls, Marc Cohn, Grant Lee Phillips, Sister Hazel, and others. He was scheduled to open for Peter Moren of Peter, Bjorn and John at Hotel Cafe in Los Angeles, California on May 2.

== Discography ==
McMillin's new record, Heartsteady, was released in summer 2008. His last record, Outlast The Day, was released in November 2006.
