= Sunil Sahu =

Indian-born American professor

Sunil Sahu (left) presenting his book to Indian President A.P.J. Abdul Kalam in 2003

Sunil Kumar Sahu is an Indian-born American professor. He is Leonard E. and Mary B. Howell Professor of Political Science at DePauw University. He has been a member of the Political Science department since 1988 and was the department chair for 10 years (2007–08, 2010–19). Prior to DePauw, he taught Political Science at St. Xavier College (now St. Xavier University) in Chicago and Delhi University (Shyamlal College) in India. A naturalized citizen of the United States, Sahu is a native of India. He was born in Muzaffarpur, Bihar, in a politically active family—his father, a grandfather and two uncles were involved in India's freedom movement. Sahu attended L.S. College in Muzaffarpur, where he was influenced by the faculty who carried on the legacy of nationalist leaders who had taught at that college a generation earlier, such as Dr. Rajendra Prasad, India's first President (1950–62), Ramdhari Singh Dinkar, a Hindi nationalist poet, and J.B. Kripalani, President of Indian National Congress at the time of the country's independence in 1947.

Sahu received his bachelor's degree in Political Science (honors) and History from Bihar University in India, his master's degrees in Political Science from Bihar University and the University of Chicago, and his Ph.D. in Political Science from the University of Chicago. Before starting his Ph.D. program, Sahu received advanced graduate training in International Relations at the School of International Studies, Jawaharlal Nehru University, in New Delhi. His teachers at the University of Chicago included Lloyd Rudolph, Susanne Hoeber Rudolph (President of American Political Science Association 2003–04), Philip Schmitter, Leonard Binder, Adam Przeworski, and Tang Tsou, as well as Bernard Silberman in comparative politics and Charles Lipson and Morton A. Kaplan in international relations.

Sahu is the department's specialist in Comparative Politics, Politics of Developing Nations (including China and South Asia), Terrorism, and International Politics/International Political Economy. He offers a number of courses at the introductory, intermediate and advanced levels: Intro to Comparative Politics and Government (POLS 150, a required course for political science majors and minors), Contemporary Political Ideologies (POLS 240), China and India in the 21st Century (POLS 253), Politics of Developing Nations (POLS 352), International Terrorism (POLS 390), Conflict and Cooperation in the Post-9/11 World (POLS 450, offered as a senior seminar course), and International Relations of South Asia (POLS 390). He also teaches a Winter Term course on Bollywood Films: Classic and Contemporary. In 2022, Sahu was awarded the Fred C. Tucker Jr. Distinguished Career Award in recognition of his contributions to DePauw through a commitment to students, teaching excellence, and University service.

Sahu is married and has two adult children. He lives in Avon, Indiana with his wife, Indu Vohra, also a political scientist. He is a member of two Indian religious and cultural organizations in greater Indianapolis—Gita Mandal and Sikh Satsang. He is a political "news junkie" and his hobbies include photography and Bollywood oldies—films and songs.

== Works ==
Sahu is the author of the book Technology Transfer, Dependence and Self-Reliant Development in the Third World: The Machine-Tool and Pharmaceutical Industries in India (Westport, Connecticut: Praeger, 1998) and book chapters "Religion and Politics in India: The Rise of Hindu Nationalism and the Bharatiya Janata Party (BJP) in India," in Religion and Politics in Comparative Perspective: The One, the Few, and the Many, edited by Ted Jelen and Clyde Wilcox (Cambridge University Press, 2002) and "Changing Regimes in Technology Transfer and Intellectual Property in India," in C. Steven LaRue (ed.), The India Handbook (Chicago and London: Fitzroy Dearborn Publishers, 1997). He has published numerous articles in scholarly journals and reference books and encyclopedias. He recently published "Globalization, WTO and the Indian Pharmaceutical Industry," in Asian Affairs: An American Review (Vol. 41, No. 4, 2014) and Social Media and Surveillance Capitalism: Facebook, Political Polarization, Orwellian Dystopia and American Democracy, Athens Journal of Social Sciences (Vol. 11, No. 3, July 2024).

He is currently working on a book titled Democracy in the Third World: Why it has succeeded in India and failed in Nigeria and a monograph on Nuclear Security in South Asia. During a sabbatical leave in 2003, Sahu conducted field research in India where he interviewed India's top nuclear and missile scientists, including President A.P.J. Abdul Kalam. He was the campus host for Benazir Bhutto, the Prime Minister of Pakistan, during her visit to DePauw in 1997.
