= Johanna Poethig =

American visual, public and performance artist

- Born: 1956 (age 69–70); Morristown, New Jersey, U.S.
- Education: University of California, Santa Cruz (BA); Mills College (MFA)
- Known for: Public art, murals, painting, sculpture, multimedia installations
- Awards: National Endowment for the Arts; California Arts Council; Social and Public Art Resource Center
- Website: johannapoethig.com

Johanna Poethig (born 1956) is an American Bay Area visual, public and performance artist whose work includes murals, paintings, sculpture and multimedia installations. She has split her practice between community-based public art and gallery and performance works that mix satire, feminism and cultural critique. Poethig emerged in the 1980s as socially engaged collaborations with youth and marginalized groups (e.g., by artists such as Tim Rollins and K.O.S.) gained increasing attention; she has worked as an artist and educator with diverse immigrant communities, children from five to seventeen, senior citizens, incarcerated women and mental health patients, among others. Artweek critic Meredith Tromble places her in an activist tradition running from Jacques-Louis David through Diego Rivera to Barbara Kruger, writing that her work, including more than fifty major murals and installations, combines "the idealist and caustic."

Poethig has been commissioned to create public art projects throughout the Bay Area and California, and in Chicago, Milwaukee, Cuba and Tbilisi, Georgia. She has exhibited internationally, and at the Los Angeles County Museum of Art, Bronx Museum of the Arts, Berkeley Art Museum and Pacific Film Archive (BAM/PFA), Asian Art Museum (San Francisco) and Yerba Buena Center for the Arts. She has been recognized with awards from the National Endowment for the Arts (NEA) and California Arts Council, among others. Poethig is based in Oakland, California.

Johanna Poethig, Calle de la Eternidad (Street of Eternity), acrylic mural on concrete, 42' x 62' (1993). Los Angeles, 351 South Broadway

== Early life and career ==
Poethig was born in 1956 in Morristown, New Jersey. Her parents, Eunice and Richard, both Presbyterian missionaries, moved the family to Manila shortly after Poethig's birth; she grew up in a Filipino community, speaking fluent Tagalog and learning about social issues and global politics from a Filipino perspective. In 1972, the family moved to Chicago, where she studied at the American Academy of Art and became interested in public art, by William Walker among others. In the late 1970s, she attended University of California, Santa Cruz, earning a BA in anthropology, politics and art in 1980.

After graduating, Poethig moved to San Francisco and made connections with women artists and the SoMA (South of Market) Filipino community. Her work on a mural for The Women's Building with six artists in 1982 set her on a collaborative, public-art path. In the subsequent decade, she won mural commissions in the Bay Area and Los Angeles and California Arts Council awards; she also taught art at a SoMA mental health center.

Poethig augmented these experiences with graduate studies at Mills College (MFA, 1992), which added a more conceptual layer to her work. In 1994, she founded Inner City Public Arts Projects for Youth and served as artistic director for six years on a number of collaborative projects in San Francisco's Tenderloin and SoMA neighborhoods. That same year, she joined the faculty of the Visual and Public Art department at California State University, Monterey Bay (CSUMB), where she taught until 2018 and is Professor Emerita.

== Work ==
In both public and gallery/performance art, Poethig draws on her cross-cultural experience and social consciousness to create inclusive work intended to offer an alternative to dominant advertising messages and American conventions of individualism and competition. Writers place her among a second generation of San Francisco community muralists, distinguished by their greater eclecticism, departure from the original Mexican mural model, and focus on identity issues. Her murals are noted for their mix of realist and expressionist modes, balance of message and aesthetics, atypical use of stylization and abstraction, and emphasis on previously unrecognized Southeast Asian communities. Poethig's gallery/performance work takes a satirical feminist approach, often critiquing glamour, consumerism and constructions of identity.

Johanna Poethig, Loop Tattoo, mural, 45' x 135', Chicago, 63 East Lake Street (2006). Left, mural in context; right, mural only.

=== Murals ===
Many of Poethig's murals pay tribute to San Francisco immigrant groups. Ang Lipi ni Lapu-Lapu (1984) depicts the origin legends and history of Filipino immigration to the United States, while Gabrielino Nation (1995, San Pedro, with Roberto Salas) recognizes the Gabrielinos, the area's earliest inhabitants. In Lakas Sambayanan (People's Power) (1986), she commemorated the peaceful overthrow of the Marcos dictatorship and rise to power of Corazon Aquino in the Philippines; its surreal central image depicts marchers pouring out of a shattered Ferdinand Marcos bust alongside images of Aquino cradling her slain husband, protesters and symbols of the country's catholic, Muslim and historic influences. The I-Hotel Mural (2010)—on San Francisco's International Hotel, a home to pioneer Chinese and Filipino immigrants demolished in 1977 and reopened in 2005—depicts the long struggle for low-income housing and features former (evicted) residents and activists in that fight.

The multistory Calle de la Eternidad (1993) represents the dislocation, adaptation and aspiration of the Los Angeles Latina/o community through a monumental pair of hands outstretched toward the sky (and background skyscrapers), which emerge from an Aztec calendar containing an Octavio Paz poem; the title references the Broadway location, once a funeral procession route known as the "Street of Eternity." The colorful, three-dimensional Tiene la lumbre por dentro (He Has the Fire Within Him) (2000, Sonoma State University) honors César Chavez and the Farm Workers Movement with images of Chavez, Dolores Huerta. the Filipino labor movement and workers' hands, Chavez's words, and non-traditional layered wood surfaces expressing the rawness of the land.

Some of Poethig's other well-known murals include the four-story Harvey Milk Memorial Mural (1988), depicting Milk in a free-spirited scene at a pride parade; To Cause To Remember (1992), an 80-foot image of a fallen Statue of Liberty chained at the feet, suggesting the nation's unrealized intentions; the 200-foot-long Stamps of Victory along Los Angeles's 110 Freeway (commissioned for the 1994 World Cup), which celebrates sport as a conduit for communication and international relations with global soccer-themed postage stamps; and Loop Tattoo (2005, Chicago), which employs a central swirl of dancers, musicians and athletes to represent the city's rich cultural life and a community sensibility.

Two later works expand on the community theme: Intertwined (2010) encircles a Tenderloin low-income housing development in a colorful, eight-story ceramic-tile ribbon with outstretched hands and uplifting text, while the glass-mosaic Rainbow Power (2019, Oakland) uses a colorful light-wave-like backdrop that intersects local youth figures as a metaphor for the benefits of shared culture, ideas and friendship. Skylight: Transmission of Knowledge/Windows to Justice (2019, CSUMB) takes a more global perspective that includes an oculus open to the sky and symbolic references to the environment and sustenance, justice, ancient and modern knowledge, and multi-national perspectives.

=== Other public works ===
Poethig's other collaborative public projects include ceramic-tile floor works and reliefs developed from fantastical children's drawings and youth workshops, playground and park sculptural installations, and city-sponsored poster and advertisement programs that incorporate conceptual approaches and critiques of capitalism. For Underdog Ad Agency (1995–6, with Delfina Piretti), she designed bus shelter posters with incarcerated women that lampooned corporate marketing strategies and encouraged positive change; a 1999 collaboration with prison inmates and CSUMB students produced bus shelter posters that addressed rising incarceration rates. Subsequent projects include "How I Saved San Francisco: New Media Heroes" (2000)—featuring youths cast as social-change heroes in imitation-movie posters installed in city kiosks—and "Cab Top Ads" (2001, also with Piretti), a series of ads on taxis that offered alternatives to media images of women and critical messages regarding objectification, sex work and gender issues.

In 2014, Poethig and Mildred Howard were chosen by the East Bay Transit board as lead artists, with Peter Richards and Joyce Hsu, to integrate public art into the architecture of 34 planned stations along a new 9.5-mile system. The project, Cultural Corridor/Urban Flow—completed in early 2021—uses the title's flow motif, visually connecting the stations with a ribbon of descriptive and poetic words and images reflecting the many neighborhoods it passes through. Its elements were rendered in laser-cut aluminum on handrail panels and decorative windscreens. They incorporate community input, ideas and facts as well as aesthetic cues (e.g., traditional cultures' cut papercrafts, architecture, colors), while also taking advantage of shifts in light and cast shadow conditions to create. shifting visual interest.

Johanna Poethig, Bahay Ni Lola (Songs for Women Living With War), Wood, canvas, capiz, ceramic, photo and sound, Pro Arts, Oakland, 2016. Left, full installation; right, detail of banig.

=== Gallery work and performance ===
Poethig's wide-ranging gallery and performance art investigates issues involving colonization, identity and glamour, consumerism and technology through statuettes and paintings, subversive mock products, installations, games, and performance. She has collaborated on video/sound collaborations with her husband, composer Chris Brown, and performances with the artist collective DIWA Arts and the group WIGband (herself, Barbara Golden, and sometimes others). Since 1986, WIGband has produced politically incorrect shows ("Lifestyles of the Poor and Shameless", 1989), films (the exercise video Silver Abs and Golden Buns), songs and CDs (Lick Me to Heaven).

Much of Poethig's work explores mainstream and cross-cultural constructions of identity. Her NEA-award-winning "The Untouchables" (1996) consisted of small ceramic figures cast from the ubiquitous Barbie doll mold that were adapted into representations of the American white upper class. That work mutated into "Babaylan Barbies" depicting Filipino archetypes and idols—including a shamaness, beauty pageant queen and biker—which were featured in a Manila/San Francisco exhibit of Filipina-American artists at San Francisco State University in 1998. Poethig's exhibition Barrionics Does Barrioque (2003, with Anne Perez and Rico Reyes) explored similar themes through paintings (gold-framed vignettes of body parts) and mixed-media performance that employed exaggeration and incongruity to comment on Filipinaness, femininity, imperialism and globalization; Artweek's Mark van Proyen described it as "a new performativity" embracing camp, cultural leveling and mockery of commodity fetishism. In 2016, Poethig curated "Songs for Women Living With War" (ProArts Gallery), which memorialized and gave voice to the experiences of women in war, in particular, Filipino "comfort women" during World War II. Poethig contributed Bahay Ni Lola (2016), a large, three-walled installation/monument that included the faces of comfort women, a woven banig (Filipino grass mat) draped with stories from women collected by author M. Evelina Galang, and voices knit into an abstract sound composition by Anne Perez.

Johanna Poethig, Big Bang Bowling Pins, installation, "Glamorgeddon," SOMArts, Oakland, 2015.

Poethig also frequently examines the excesses and contradictions of consumer capitalism. In the late 1990s, she conceived a fictitious consumer products conglomeration (International House of Cargo) and alter-ego (CEO Angel Savage, costumed as a hospital candy-striper/nun) in order to satirize the "cargo cult" mentality of American market culture. The firm's painted and sculpted offerings included technologically advanced pharmaceuticals (the "RX Series"), new age cures (Omega 3-infused cigarettes and Spring Chicken: Genomix, a bio-engineered, therapeutic snack food), beauty products and fashions, pitched as effortless solutions to a conflicting array of fears, fetishes and neuroses.

In two multimedia exhibitions—"The Glamour Summit" (2000) and "Glamorgeddon" (2015)—Poethig considered glamour as a form of colonization and social construct, poking fun at fashion aesthetics and obsessions with paintings, performances and refigured objects (e.g., bedazzled hardhats, traffic cones and bowling pins); reviewers describe the shows as "kitschy, trashy, intelligent" balances of "extravagance and thoughtfulness." In the show "Driven" (2007, Togonon Gallery), Poethig narrowed her focus to the American dependency on large, gas-guzzling vehicles to assuage angst (loneliness, inadequacy, fear); the show featured paintings of women seemingly seduced or pacified by their vehicles and a large painted-tile rendering of a Hummer (Security), accompanied by an ominous, almost subliminal soundtrack conceived with Chris Brown.

In the later shows "Positional Vertigo," "Phyllotaxis and Parastichy in a Time of Love and War," and "Impossible Matter" (Mercury 20 Gallery, 2017–9), Poethig explored the innate search for the mystical in a culture of media overload, mathematical patterns in nature's terrestrial and extraterrestrial life systems, and alternative natural histories through spinning wheels of fortune, paintings, prints, sculpture costumes and props, and original texts.

== Awards ==
Poethig has been recognized by the California Arts Council (1989, 1995, 1996), Social and Public Art Resource Center (SPARC) in Los Angeles (1993 commission; Siqueiros Award, 2013), National Endowment for the Arts (1996), and Potrero Nuevo Fund Prize (1999), among others; her ceramic-and-paint mural Dragonfly won a San Francisco Beautification Award (2001). In 2021, she was awarded a California Arts Council Legacy Artist Fellowship. She has received artist residencies in Manila and Tbilisi (Georgia), and at the Montalvo Arts Center and Headlands Center for the Arts, among others.
