= Jodie Gates =

American dance director and choreographer

Jodie Gates is a professional American dance director and choreographer. She is known for her career as a principal ballet dancer with the Joffrey Ballet, Pennsylvania Ballet and Ballet Frankfurt. In 2005, Gates founded the non-profit presenting organization, Laguna Dance Festival. In 2013, Gates was appointed Vice Dean of the Glorya Kaufman School of Dance at the University of Southern California, and oversaw the founding artistic vision of the Kaufman School. Currently, she is a professor of Dance and the Founding Director at University of Southern California's Glorya Kaufman School of Dance.

== Performing career ==
Jodie Gates’ performing career began under the directorship of Robert Joffrey. Gates danced professionally with the Joffrey Ballet company from 1981 to 1995, where she worked with a host of renowned choreographers, including Alonzo King, Agnes de Mille, Paul Taylor, William Forsythe, Martha Clarke and Mark Morris. Throughout her ballet career Gates danced with the Pennsylvania Ballet, Frankfurt Ballet, and was also a founding member of Complexions Contemporary Ballet.

== Choreography ==
She has choreographed over 70 works classical ballet companies as well as contemporary ballet companies.

Gates' works include: Barely Silent premiered at The Joyce Theatre in New York City in January 2007, commissioned for Complexions Contemporary Ballet; Minor Loop for The Washington Ballet in June 2006; Momentary Play premiered in New York for Cedar Lake Contemporary Ballet in October 2005, now and again, premiered at the Joyce Theater and created for New York City Ballet in 2005; Three at a Time for the Laguna Dance Theater in 2005; In the Arms of Morpheus for the now-disbanded Phrenic New Ballet in Philadelphia in 2004; Somewhere/In-Between, created for the now-disbanded Ballet Pacifica in 2003; Por Ti, choreographed for the American Ballet Theatre's summer workshop in 2003; and an original work for Pennsylvania Ballet dancers in 2000.

== Non-profit organization ==
In 2005, Gates founded the non-profit presenting organization, Laguna Dance Festival. The organization is active with bringing dance performances and educational opportunities to the community and is based in Laguna Beach, California.

== Academic career ==
Jodie Gates worked as an associate professor of dance at the University of California Irvine from 2006 to 2013, when she was appointed to become the first Vice Dean and Director of the USC Kaufman School of Dance. Gates is the Founding Director of the University of Southern California's Glorya Kaufman School of Dance. She implemented the artistic vision of the new school and created a BFA dance curriculum. The curriculum has been named "The New Movement", and is a new hybrid model for dance education – exploring performance, choreography and research while immersing students in a dance conservatory environment and rigorous academic studies at USC.
