= Jeffrey T. Mezger =

American businessman

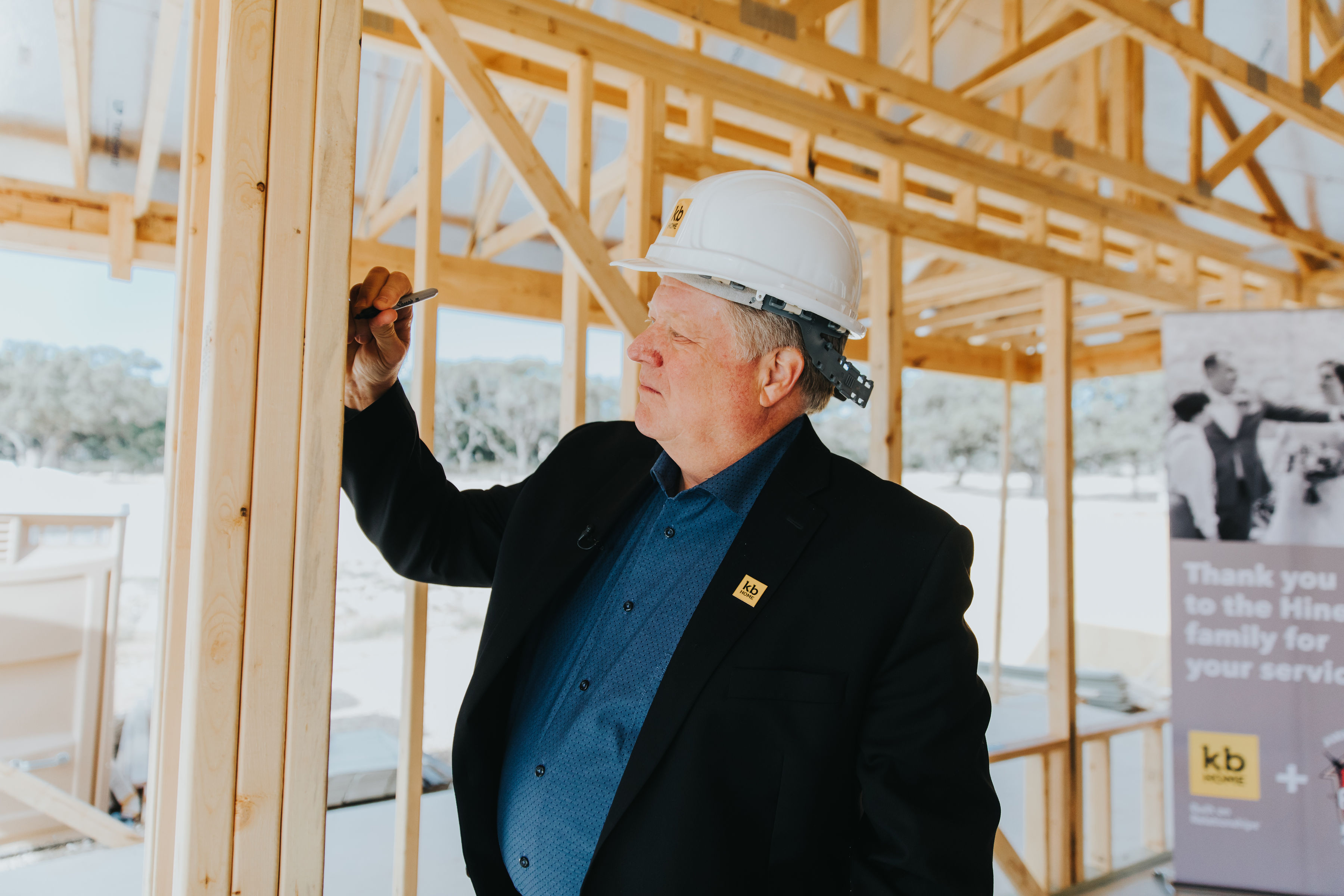
- Mezger at Frame signing ceremony with Jared Allen's Homes for Wounded Warriors.
- Education: DePauw University
- Employer: KB Home
- Title: CEO

Jeffrey T. Mezger is an American businessman. He is the president and chief executive officer of KB Home.

== Early life ==
Mezger was born in Chicago, Illinois. He graduated from DePauw University with a Bachelor of Science in economics in 1977.

== Career ==
Mezger joined KB Home in 1993. From 1999 to 2006, he was chief operating officer and executive vice president of KB Home. He has been president and CEO since 2006.

Mezger sits on the board of directors of Builder Homesite and on the High Production Builders Council of the National Association of Home Builders. He also is on the executive board of the Lusk Center for Real Estate at the University of Southern California and on the policy advisory board of the Fisher Center for Real Estate & Urban Economics at the University of California, Berkeley.

In 2010, Builder Magazine gave Mezger its "CEO of the Year" award.

In 2017, Mezger was disciplined by KB Home after audio surfaced of him shouting profanities at his neighbor Kathy Griffin.
