= Zobel Building =

Building in Los Angeles, California

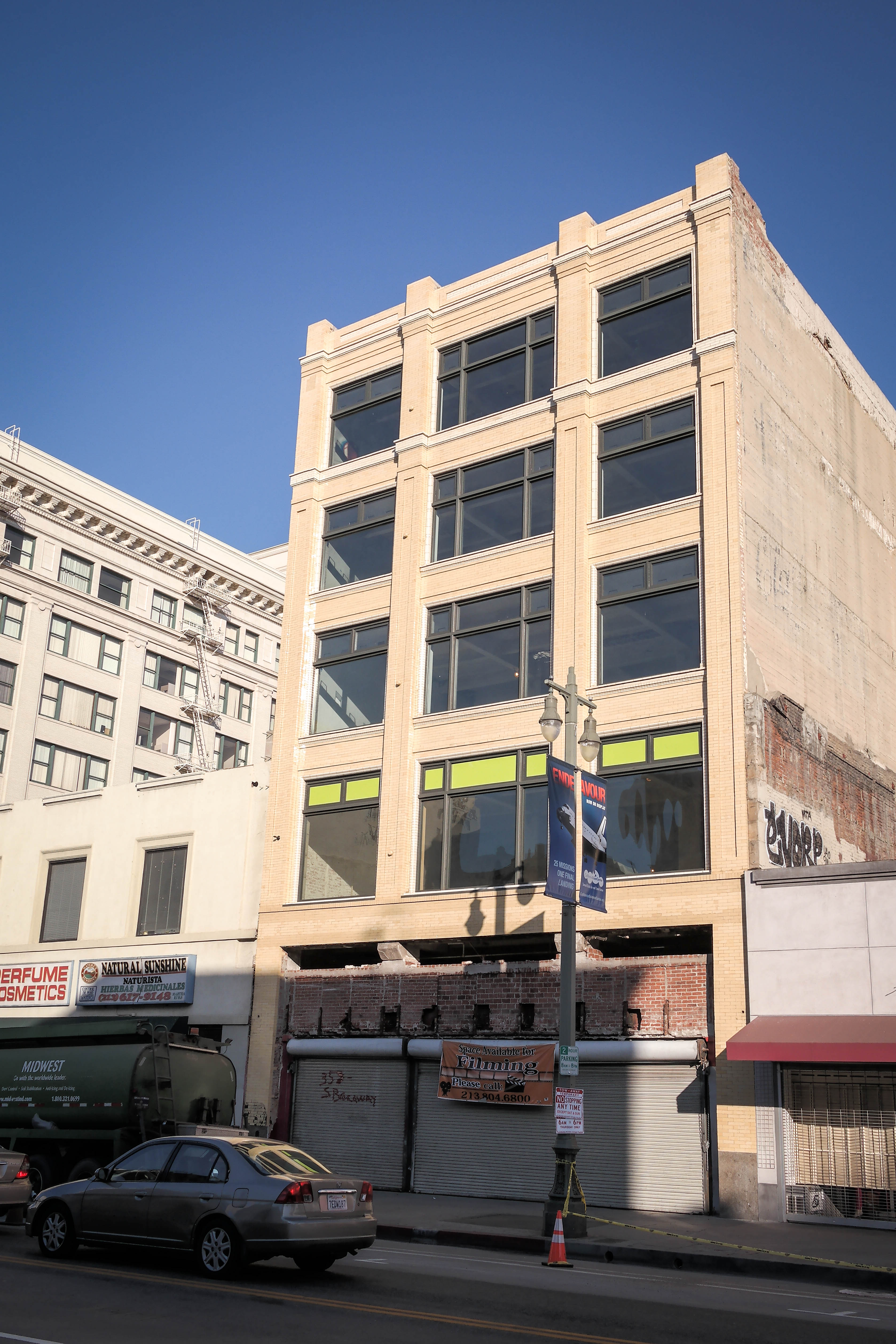
- The building in 2014

- Location within the Los Angeles metropolitan area

General information
- Location: 351-353 S. Broadway, Los Angeles, California
- Coordinates: 34°03′00″N 118°14′58″W
- Completed: c. 1912

Zobel Building is a historic six-story building located at 351-353 S. Broadway in the Broadway Theater District in the historic core of downtown Los Angeles. It is most notable for the Calle de la Eternidad mural that was formerly on its northern exterior.

== History ==
Zobel Building was built c. 1912. In 1921, The Wonder, formerly the largest retail silk store in the United States, moved into the building, and Graysons department store occupied the building in the 1950s.

In 1979, the Broadway Theater and Commercial District was added to the National Register of Historic Places, with Zobel Building listed as a non-contributing property in the district. In 1992–1993, Johanna Poethig painted a large mural titled Calle de la Eternidad on the building's northern wall. The mural has since become a "landmark."

In 2013, Zobel Building was converted to offices. During the conversion, architects removed a 12-foot ficus tree that was growing out of the building's fifth-floor southern wall and rising above the roofline. The 1950s facade was also removed and the Calle de la Eternidad mural was digitized with plans to move it from the building's northern to southern exterior. In 2014, the building was awarded $20,788 ($28,272 in 2025) through the Bringing Back Broadway initiative to accent its facade columns.

== Architecture and design ==
Zobel Building is made of brick. A flat stucco facade was added to the building in the 1950s and was removed when the building was converted to offices in 2013. The original facade features windows that overlook Broadway.
