= Oscar T. Brookins =

American economist and academic

- Occupations: Economist and academic

Academic background
- Education: A.B., Mathematics; M.A., Economics; Ph.D., Economics
- Alma mater: DePauw University; Northeastern University; State University of New York, Buffalo
- Thesis: Macroeconomic Analysis of Monetary Factors in Open Economy: A Short-Run Empirical Analysis (1976)

Academic work
- Institutions: Northeastern University
- Notable students: Abdul Momen

Oscar T. Brookins is an American economist and academic. He is a Professor Emeritus in the Department of Economics at Northeastern University.

Brookins is most known for his work on poverty analysis and development studies. His work revolves around international finance and development, macroeconomics, and monetary and financial economics.

== Education ==
Brookins completed his Artium Baccalaureus in Mathematics from DePauw University in 1965 and then obtained a Master of Arts in Economics from Northeastern University in 1967. Later in 1976, he completed his Ph.D., in Economics from the State University of New York, Buffalo.

== Career ==
Brookins started his academic career in 1969 by joining the Department of Economics at the State University College, Buffalo, where he held multiple appointments including serving as an Instructor from 1969 to 1970 and assistant professor from 1970 to 1972. Between 1971 and 1974, he held an appointment as a lecturer at the Department of Economics at the University of Ghana. From 1974 to 1982, he served as an assistant professor in the Department of Economics at the University of Notre Dame while also holding a concurrent appointment as a lecturer in the Department of Economics at the University of Dar es Salaam. In 1982, he joined the Department of Economics at Virginia State University, where he briefly served as a Lecturer until 1983. He then served as an assistant professor at the Department of Economics at Northeastern University for three years. He subsequently held multiple appointments there, including Executive Officer from 1990 to 1992, and associate professor from 1986 to 2020. As of 2020, he has been holding the position of professor emeritus in the Department of Economics at Northeastern University.

== Research ==
Brookins' research on open macroeconomics and applied econometrics earned him the Fulbright-Hays Summer Grant to Southern Africa in 1991. He has authored numerous publications spanning the areas of bond markets, economic development, and development studies.

=== Economic development ===
Brookins has made contributions to the study of economic development through empirical analysis of various aspects of economic development, including the impact of different policies and institutions on economic growth, as well as the role of human capital and technology in this field. While investigating the use of the Program Evaluation and Review Technique (PERT) and Critical Path Method (CPM) for economic analysis and planning, he advocated for the adoption of the former as a means to comprehend the development process, citing its capability to expedite the process of effective planning and subsequent execution of the said plans. He examined the role of Institutions in planning economic development and stressed that emerging economies cannot afford to have their savings dormant in one sector while experiencing shortages in others thereby emphasizing the significance of eradicating such fragmentation in order to streamline the development process. In his evaluation of the relationship between carbon dioxide emissions, electricity consumption, energy intensity, and gross domestic product (GDP) per capita for 18 countries, his study indicated a positive correlation between GDP per capita growth rates and both electricity consumption and carbon dioxide emissions, while also outlining an inverse relationship between energy intensity and GDP per capita.

=== Corruption ===
While analyzing the corruption trends in Sri Lanka, India, and Bangladesh, his work revealed that coercive corruption practices were prevalent in Bangladesh, whereas collusive corruption practices were more common in Sri Lanka and India. The findings of the study also emphasized the importance of newspaper reports citing their ability to be a valuable source of information for understanding corruption and anti-corruption efforts and suggested that in democratic countries like India and Sri Lanka, countervailing actions are more likely to lead to legal actions and investigative reports. In related research, he investigated the views of people living in Karachi's slums with regard to the underlying reasons behind poverty and corruption and recommended that the government take steps to alter the perspective of underprivileged individuals through education and initiate measures to curb corruption, particularly minor corruption, which disproportionately impacts the well-being of economically disadvantaged citizens.

=== Monetary policy and debt management ===
Focusing his research efforts on monetary frameworks of less developed economies, Brookins advocated the investigation of monetary mechanics of developing countries citing its ability to provide researchers with direct insight into the monetary sector, while also yielding indirect insight into economic processes in the real sector, ultimately leading to a better understanding of these countries' economies. While exploring the relationship between corporate debt and government debt in China's financial market, his study revealed that governmental bonds, comprising treasury bonds and municipal bonds, exert a considerable adverse influence on the borrowing capacity and debt leverage of corporations from commercial banks, resulting in the displacement of their debt and borrowing activities. His further research on local vs central government debt in China established that both types of government debt have an adverse effect on corporate debt, whereby the central government's debt leads to a decrease in the quantity of corporate bonds available while local government debt can lead to a decrease in the availability of corporate loans.

== Awards and honors ==
- 1991 – Fulbright-Hays Summer Grant to Southern Africa
- 2000 – Senior Fulbright Scholar to Tallinn Technical University, Estonia,

=== Selected articles ===
- Brookins, O. T. (1970). Factor Analysis and Gross National Product: A Comment. Quarterly Journal of Economics, LXXXIV (4), pp. 648–650.
- Hussain, M., & Brookins, O. T. (2001). On the determinants of national saving: An extreme-bounds analysis. Weltwirtschaftliches Archiv, 150–174.
- Brookins, M. L., & Brookins, O. T. (2002). An exploratory analysis of fertility differentials in India. Journal of Development Studies, 39(2), 54–72.
- Ahmad*, Naved, & Brookins, O. T. (2004). On corruption and countervailing actions in three South Asian nations. The Journal of Policy Reform, 7(1), 21–30.
- Ahmad, N., & Brookins, O. T. (2007). The impact of corruption on efficiency in developing economies. Journal of Economic & Management Perspectives, 1(2), 64.
- Brookins, O. T., & Brookins, K. J. (2011). The US Subprime Mortgage Debacle and Implications for Wealth Inequality. International Journal of Economic Perspectives, 5(2).
- Zhang, M., Brookins, O. T., & Huang, X. (2022). The crowding out effect of central versus local government debt: Evidence from China. Pacific-Basin Finance Journal, 72, 101707.
