= Ellen Maycock =

American mathematician (born 1950)

- Born: September 15, 1950 (age 75); Maryland, U.S.
- Education: Wellesley College (BA); Purdue University (MS, PhD)
- Occupations: Mathematician; educator

Ellen Johnston Maycock (born September 15, 1950 in Maryland) is an American mathematician and mathematics educator. She is the former Johnson Family University Professor and professor emerita of mathematics at DePauw University in Greencastle, Indiana. Her mathematical research was in functional analysis.

== Education and career ==
In 1972, Maycock received a B.A. degree in mathematics and economics from Wellesley College in Wellesley, Massachusetts. In 1974, she received a M.S. degree in mathematics and in 1986, a Ph.D. in mathematics, both from Purdue University in West Lafayette, Indiana. Her dissertation "The Brauer Group of Graded Continuous trace $C^*$-algebras was supervised by Jerome Alvin Kaminker.

After teaching at Wellesley for two years following her degree, in 1988, Maycock joined the faculty at DePauw as an assistant professor, was promoted to associate professor in 1993 and to professor in 2001. She developed a series of workshops that brought faculty from across the nation to DePauw to learn innovative teaching styles. Maycock is known for her development of creative approaches to teaching abstract algebra. She developed a course that used the software package "Exploring Small Groups" to assist students in their mastery of the concepts of abstract algebra. She also introduced computer technology in courses on Euclidean and non-Euclidean geometry and analysis.

Maycock has served on the Editorial Boards of the Mathematical Association of America (MAA) Notes and Spectrum series and the American Mathematical Society Committee on the Profession. She served on the AMS-MAA-SIAM Committee on Employment Opportunities Past Members from 2007 to 2014.

In September 2005, Maycock joined the staff of the American Mathematical Society (AMS) as an associate executive director. In that role, she was responsible for AMS meetings and professional services, programs that served AMS members, supported and improved the public image of the profession. She remained in that position until 2015, when she was replaced by T. Christine Stevens.

Maycock was on the steering committee of INGenIOuS (Investing in the Next Generation through Innovative and Outstanding Strategies), a project involving the National Science Foundation, mathematics, and statistics professional societies. The project culminated with a workshop in 2013 that highlighted ways to increase the number of mathematics students that enter the workforce.

== Recognition ==
Maycock was selected by DePauw to receive a University Professor Award for 2003–2007. She was honored for her sustained excellence in teaching, service, and professional accomplishments and was named Johnson Family University Professor for this period.

== Books and edited collections ==
- Ellen Maycock Parker: Laboratory Experiences in Group Theory. Classroom Resource Material Series. Mathematical Association of America. 1996. ISBN 0-88385-705-7. MR 1419095.
- Ellen J. Maycock and Allen C. Hibbard: Innovations in Teaching Abstract Algebra. MAA Notes. Vol. 60. Mathematical Association of America. 2002. ISBN 978-0-88385-171-5.
