= Bringing Back Broadway =

Bringing Back Broadway is a public–private partnership begun in 2008 and led by Councilmember José Huizar, with Executive Director Jessica Wethington McLean, to revitalize the historic Broadway corridor of Los Angeles. Goals are to provide economic development and business assistance; encourage historic preservation; reactivate Broadway's historic theaters and long-underutilized commercial buildings; and increase transit and development options by bringing a streetcar back to downtown Los Angeles with Broadway as the spine for the route.

City policies associated with Bringing Back Broadway include the City's Historic Commercial Reuse Guidelines, Broadway Entertainment Zone policies, a facade lighting grant program, the Historic Broadway Sign District, and the Broadway Streetscape plan, one of the country's largest road diets.

== Location ==
The historic Broadway corridor, part of an important National Register Historic District, is in the center of Downtown Los Angeles and in the heart of the Historic Core. The initiative is dedicated to revitalizing the historic Broadway district between 2nd street and Olympic Boulevard of Los Angeles.

== History ==
Broadway, constructed as a part of the 1849 plan of Los Angeles by Lieutenant Edward Ord, is one of the oldest streets of the city and is a part of the National Register of Historic Places. For more than 50 years, Broadway from 1st Street to Olympic Boulevard represented the main commercial street of Los Angeles, and one of the premier theater and movie palace districts as well. The entire street is a live display of the grand and marvelous architectural and engineering feats of the 20th century.

Despite having such a rich culturally enriched history, the Broadway corridor has not been able to meet up to its potential and expectations in the recent years. Most of the historic buildings are left vacant with a very low occupancy rate, especially on the upper floors. This presented a challenge to the city government of Los Angeles, which found expression through the Bringing Back Broadway initiative, launched in 2008. The Bringing Back Broadway initiative took up the active task to revitalize the historic Broadway corridor over a span of 10 years, through policy making and implementation of economic development strategies and tools.

== Organization ==
The Bringing Back Broadway initiative is led by Councilmember José Huizar of council district 14. The executive director of the project is Jessica Wethington Mclean. The project is also supported by a group of property owners, residents, business owners and advocates who work in collaboration on committees and with other stakeholders.

== Projects ==
The Bringing Back Broadway initiative is a multifaceted preservation and renovation initiative, which spearheads numerous projects. The individual projects are as follows:

=== Broadway Theatre and Entertainment District Design Guide ===
The Broadway Theater and Entertainment District Design Guide (CDO) provides guidelines and standards for development projects along Broadway between 2nd Street and Olympic Boulevard in Broadway. The intent of the Broadway Design Guide is to provide guidance and direction in the rehabilitation of existing structures and the design of new buildings to improve the appearance, enhance the identity, and promote walkability of the Broadway corridor and to encourage the development of a regional entertainment district, centered around its twelve historic theaters.

The document was created through Bringing Back Broadway, with input from a wide range of stakeholders, including historians, architects and planners in cooperation with the Los Angeles Department of City Planning. It was adopted by the Planning Commission in July 2009.

=== Broadway Streetscape Master Plan ===
The Broadway Streetscape Master Plan is an approach to a multimodal, pedestrian oriented development plan that will contribute towards supporting a thriving environment along the Broadway corridor. Council member José Huizar has said, “The streetscape plan boldly prioritizes people over vehicles, provides much-needed infrastructure support and major improvements to a street that has been neglected for far too long, while providing a showcase for the Downtown L.A. Streetcar and the revitalization of the Historic Broadway Theatre District.”

The Broadway Streetscape Master Plan is a 2 phase process. The first phase, a $1.5 million-dollar project, opened in August 2014, includes an innovative “dress rehearsal” installation of sidewalk extensions delineated from the roadway with bollards, planters, and special paving. This groundbreaking approach allowed significant changes to be implemented in the short term in a cost-effective way, influencing future planning in Los Angeles.

Phase One of the plan features a “road diet” where Broadway from 3rd Street to just past 11th Street was reconfigured from four lanes to three, reclaiming more sidewalk space for pedestrians and allowing 24-hour parking and loading, which did not previously exist. The Bringing back initiative partnered with LADOT for this project. LADOT was tasked with implementing the first phase of the project over a time span of 6months.

The first phase of the process has already earned national attention for its effort at urban place making. Gizmodo named the Bringing Back Broadway initiative as one of the “5 Big New Projects Remaking Cities into Havens for Pedestrians ‘’. The initiative also received awards from the American Planning Association for merits for plan implementation. “This is the city’s first real complete streets project, and it’s one of the country’s most significant urban corridor projects,” said Jessica Wethington McLean, executive director of Bringing Back Broadway.

Phase 2 of the plan will include new pedestrian lighting, street furniture, wayfinding signage, plants and street trees, decorative paving materials, water drainage and filtration system and more. The city has secured $4.6 million through two grants from the Metropolitan Transportation Authority for the phase two work.

=== Downtown Los Angeles Streetcar ===
The Downtown Los Angeles Streetcar project aspires to bring the beloved historic streetcar back into the city. In May 2011, the Bringing Back Initiative along with LA Metro, Los Angeles Department of Transportation and several other stakeholders, for the first time started conducting feasibility studies regarding the restoration of the historic streetcar service in downtown Los Angeles. After a lot of analysis, a preferred route was selected in January 2011. "We wanted to give people an alternative to getting downtown that was enjoyable, instead of sitting behind the wheel and hating yourself," said Shane Phillips, the project director of LA Streetcar Inc., a nonprofit working with the government on the project.

Los Angeles Streetcar Inc was founded in January 2009 with an inaugural fundraiser hosted by Eli Broad, Tim Leiweke and Rick Caruso. The planning portion of the project was supported with seed funding from the former Community Redevelopment Agency of the City of Los Angeles, which allowed the project to undergo environmental review and other preliminary steps. Jessica Wethington Mclean, executive Director of Bringing Back Broadway said, “The streetcar is going to deliver thousands of people on the sidewalks of downtown LA, thousands of people that would otherwise be in their cars, driving by, not looking at the businesses, not stopping at the storefronts.”

The streetcar is projected to be running around a 3.8-mile one-way loop system, 7 days a week. It will run in the same lane as vehicular traffic and at the same speed, which is typical for modern streetcar systems in the United States. The DTLA Streetcar is planned to offer the most frequent streetcar service in the entire country, with 7-minute headways during peak hours and frequencies of 10 to 15 minutes during off-hours.

The DTLA Streetcar aims to connect and support the revitalization of Downtown LA districts and its historic core, and will function as an access point, allowing patrons to make easier connections to the existing regional network. It would serve areas including Historic Broadway and the Historic Core, South Park, L.A. LIVE and the Los Angeles Convention Center, with an optional spur that would serve Bunker Hill, Grand Avenue and the Music Center. Streetcars are an environmentally friendly alternative and a much needed “last mile” solution.

The DTLA Streetcar project is currently backed by a voter-approved $85 million special tax measure; is funded through LA County's Measure M with $200 million. Operations will be funded by a $282 million council-adopted operational plan. Once completed, the ridership is projected at up to 6000 riders per day, which in turn is projected to result in 8500 new jobs in Los Angeles, development of 784,000 square feet of new and renovated office space valued at $259 million and $87 million in unrestricted tax revenue.

Construction of the DTLA Streetcar is scheduled to commence by 2018-19. After construction and testing, the streetcar is expected to start operating for revenue service by 2020-2021.

=== Night on Broadway ===
“Night on Broadway” held thus far in 2015, 2016 and 2017 celebrates the accomplishments of The Bringing Back Initiative. The Night on Broadway event is one of the largest one-day music & arts festivals in the United States.

A mile-long stretch of Broadway between 3rd St. and Olympic Blvd. becomes closed off and transformed for the free event, offering music, games and activities for kids and adults, art installations and one-of-a-kind experiences featuring hundreds of acts, including performances on 10 stages in the street and in six of Broadway's historic theaters.

=== Broadway Historic Sign District ===
The Broadway Historic Sign District encourages and acknowledges the usage of signage to promote the distinctive aesthetic of the historic Broadway district. It also acts as an important measure to control blight created by poorly placed and badly designed signage.

On January 20, 2016, the city council approved the Historic Broadway Sign District ordinance. The Broadway Sign District was adopted by L.A. City Council after five years of development and is now in effect. As part of the Broadway Sign district, neon signs, kinetic signs, and open panel roof signs are allowed. Revenue generating signs on buildings that meet minimum occupancy in the upper floors are permitted.

=== Broadway Historic Commercial Reuse guidelines ===
The Broadway Historic Commercial Reuse guidelines aim to assist in the commercial reuse of historical building along the Broadway corridor.

All buildings are not suited for housing and it is estimated that there are about 1 million square feet of vacant spaces, which could be put into use through commercial reuse.

Beginning in 2008 and after 5 years of collaborating effort between the Bringing Back Broadway community, L.A Fire Department, L.A Department of Building & Safety, and a dedicated group of architects and code reviewers, led by executive director Jessica Wethington McLean with architects Karin Liljegren and Rocky Rockefeller, the Broadway Historic Commercial Reuse guidelines were announced on December 12, 2013.

=== Broadway Façade Lighting Program ===
The Broadway Façade Lighting program of Bringing Back Broadway and is being implemented by the LA Neighborhood Initiative, LANI. The Broadway Façade Lighting Program offers $750,000 grant funding to property and business owners on Broadway Street. The fund is aimed specifically towards historic buildings, and buildings which have already invested a sum towards renovation and restoration.

The program is devised to accentuate the aesthetic and architectural marvel of the historic Broadway corridor through façade lighting. It also supports public safety by enhancing the visual factor, especially at night.

On March 25, 2014, grant recipients will include:

- Bradbury Building (304 S Broadway)
- Million Dollar Theatre (307 S Broadway)
- Victor Clothing Company Building (242 S. Broadway)
- Zobel Building (353 S. Broadway)
- Bumiller/Campbell Blake Building (430 S. Broadway)
- Metropolitan Building (449 S. Broadway)
- Schulte United Building (529 S. Broadway)
- Broadway-Spring Arcade (541 S. Spring St.)
- Clifton's Brookdale Cafeteria (648 S. Broadway)
- Wurlitzer Music Building (818 S. Broadway)
- Eastern Columbia Building (849 S. Broadway)
- LL Burns Western Costume Building (908 S. Broadway)

Noted theatrical lighting designer Tom Ruzika, famous for his work at the Hollywood Bowl, the Los Angeles Theatre Centre, etc. is creating the lighting designs for each of the individual properties. Ruzika said, “Broadway is like a large stage setting with the building facades as the featured performers. I look forward to helping bring them back into focus through this grant program.” Keeping up with the standards of sustainability, each lighting equipment for the historic facades will be energy efficient, Title 24 and Cal green compliant.

== Impact ==
The past few years have seen some major changes in the Broadway corridor after the launch of the Bringing Back Broadway initiative. The initiative has incentivized nearly $1 billion in investment, new retail, hotel and commercial development; and residential units on a previously struggling street. The commission has been improving the major boulevards by widening sidewalks, eliminating traffic lanes, constructing new parking structures which have found expression in the arrival of all kinds of stores and restaurants. The initiative is considered a major trendsetter in the field of progressive urban place making. The new policies, which are aimed at adaptive reuse of the historic buildings have also found major success.

== Awards ==
- Plan Implementation Award of Merit from the Los Angeles Chapter of the American Planning Association (APA)
- 2014 Award of Merit for Urban Design from APA's California Chapter.

== See also ==
- Public-private partnerships in the United States
