= Eunice Blanchard Poethig =

American Presbyterian minister, educator, and leader (1930–2018)

Eunice Poethig
- Born: Eunice Blanchard; January 16, 1930; Hempstead, New York, U.S.
- Died: March 25, 2018 (aged 88); Chicago, Illinois, U.S.
- Education: DePauw University (BA); Union Theological Seminary (MA, PhD); McCormick Theological Seminary (MDiv, STM)
- Organization: Presbyterian Church (USA)
- Movement: Presbyterianism; Feminism
- Spouse: Richard Poethig (m. 1952)
- Children: 5, including Johanna

Eunice Blanchard Poethig (January 16, 1930 – March 25, 2018) was an American Presbyterian minister, national leader and educator. She served the Presbyterian Church (USA) as national Director of the Congregational Ministries Division, Executive Presbyter of Western New York, and Associate Executive of the Presbytery of Chicago, and spent fifteen years as an urban mission worker in the Philippines. She was one of a growing number of women ordained as clergy and appointed to prominent positions in the church, a trend that accelerated during her leadership in the 1980s and 1990s.

Poethig's ministry revolved around progressive issues such as advocacy for women clergy, full inclusion of LGBTQ and other minorities, economic justice, and making churches responsive to contemporary concerns and culture. She served during an era of heightened "culture wars" in the church and the United States generally, and took positions on social issues and sexual and gender inclusion that some groups considered controversial. As a feminist biblical scholar and hymnodist, Poethig produced research, books and articles on topics including the victory song tradition of women in ancient Israel, the ordination of women, and Filipino hymns. She was married to Richard Poethig, also a Presbyterian minister, for sixty-six years and died in Chicago in 2018, at age 88.

== Personal life ==
Poethig was born Eunice Blanchard in 1930 in Hempstead, New York and raised in Buffalo, New York and Dayton, Ohio. Her father, Werner "Pete" Blanchard, was an inventor, pilot and head of the Aeroproducts Division of General Motors; in 1948, he died in a private plane crash at age 48. After his death, her mother, Juliet Stroh Blanchard, traveled extensively and built a career producing filmstrips for the United Nations and UNESCO; she later became a popular writer, lecturer and leader in the League of Women Voters, and in her sixties, joined the Peace Corps.

Poethig graduated from DePauw University in 1951 and earned a master's degree in Christian Education from Union Theological Seminary in 1952. She met Richard Poethig at the seminary and they married following their graduations. After his ordination in the United Presbyterian Church (UPCUSA), they moved to Buffalo, New York. The Poethigs had three children—Richard Scott, Kathryn (Kerry) and Johanna—before relocating to Manila in 1957 to work through the new Commission on Ecumenical Mission and Relations (COEMAR) with the United Church of Christ of the Philippines. They later had two more children, Margaret and Erika. Unlike most Americans in Manila, who sent their children to American private schools, they educated their children at local private and parochial schools, where they learned Tagalog and developed an identification with Filipino culture, history and social perspectives.

In 1972, the family resettled in the United States in Chicago, where Richard directed the institute on the Church in Urban-Industrial Society (ICUIS) at McCormick Theological Seminary. Eunice continued her graduate work at McCormick, earning Master of Divinity (1975) and Master of Sacred Theology (1977) degrees; she completed a PhD in Old Testament studies at Union Theological Seminary in New York in 1985.

In 1979, Poethig was ordained to ministry in the PC(USA), and shortly after, named Associate Executive of the Presbytery of Chicago. As she attained positions of increasing leadership in the church, the family relocated, first to Buffalo and then to Louisville, Kentucky, site of the PC(USA)'s national headquarters. In their later years, the Poethigs lived in Hyde Park, Chicago.

== Fraternal worker in Manila (1957–1972) ==
The Poethigs were part of a new, decolonializing model of American mission work in the post-war years that emphasized partnership between churches in the global north and south. American Presbyterians signaled this shift by referring to themselves as "fraternal workers" called by national churches to help address relevant needs. COEMAR's American fraternal workers in the Philippines—a former U.S. colony that had only become a republic in 1946—were made acutely aware that American mission was entangled with the colonial legacy of U.S. military, business and culture.

The Poethigs lived in metro Manila between 1957 and 1972, a period of dramatic change in terms of urban growth, industrialization and sovereignty movements in the developing world. Richard contributed to the new field of "urban-industrial evangelism," which focused on social justice, labor practices and fair housing issues. Eunice contributed as a Christian educator developing material more culturally relevant for a Philippine context. She worked for the Ellinwood Malate Church and taught at the Ellinwood Bible School (1957–61) and Philippine Women's University (1962–8). Later, she assisted in broader capacities for the Philippine National Council Churches and as editor for a new publishing house, New Day Publications (1969–72).

While in Manila, Poethig pursued what would be a lifelong interest in the role of music in spiritual life. Her research as a hymnodist resulted in her first published works, songbooks for a younger generation that explore Filipino hymns: Everybody I Love You (1971) and Let's Sing Christmas (1972). She also co-edited the Filipino Family Cookbook (1972) with Eva Villanueva.

== Work in the Presbyterian Church (USA) ==
Poethig contributed to the PC(USA) as a feminist advocate for women clergy, full inclusion of LGBTQ and marginalized groups, and bridge-building across different communities. As a church administrator, she served two presbyteries that function as regional governing bodies, in the positions of Associate Executive of the Presbytery of Chicago (1979–85) and Executive Presbyter of the Presbytery of Western New York (1986–93); she was among the first ordained woman to serve in the leadership of a presbytery. In 1993, she became Director of the newly created Congregational Ministries Division (1993–7), then one of the church's three most powerful national leadership positions. In the 2000s, Poethig served on the boards of the Stony Point Center—one of three major PC(USA) conference centers—and the International Association of Women Ministers, where she was elected president in 2011.

A major concern in Poethig's work was the continuing and future viability of churches in contemporary life, including economic and social issues. While in Chicago, she oversaw 150 Plus Tomorrow: Churches Plan for the Future (1982), an influential urban analysis of demographic change and its potential effect on congregational strategy and development. She also penned or was quoted in articles and editorials exploring the challenges faced by churches due to public policy, media trivialization of religious life, and nationwide culture-war divisions. In Western New York, she emphasized the church's role as a resource for public dialogue, training, community programs, and the sharing of ideas across denominations; while there, she also served as chairman of Buffalo's Cabinet of Bishops and Executives and worked with local organizations and leaders to help preserve the area's manufacturing job base.

Poethig was a strong advocate for ordained and lay leadership by women, which the PC(USA) had been slow to accept. As Executive Presbyter of Western New York, she helped to expand the number of women clergy by fourfold in her first five years. In 1994, she participated in the NGO Forum of the United Nations World Conference on Women in China, and organized conferences in the Presbytery of Chicago celebrating the ordination of women in 1995 and 1996. She also directed the production of Women’s Ordination: Past, Present & Future (2006), an educational two-DVD set that recounted the long journey toward women's ordination in the Presbyterian Church ("A Flame in Our Hearts: Called, Ordained, Visioning") and featured interviews with women leaders ("A Fire in Our Bodies: Six Women Leading the Way").

Poethig participated in the controversial 1993 interfaith Re-Imagining Conference, which explored feminine and feminist theologies and promoted equal partnership with men at all levels of religious life. It provoked a significant backlash from conservative factions, and Poethig's participation played a role in her being denied reappointment as Director of the Congregational Ministries Division in late 1997. Her contract was allowed to expire without advance notice or correct procedure, prompting concern (based on earlier dismissals) that an anti-feminist campaign was weeding out liberal leaders from the PC(USA)'s national staff. Poethig's removal incited protests from the Presbytery of Western New York and a multi-state petition drive by the Louisville-based organization Justice for Women.

Poethig often personally took public, socially progressive positions on abortion and contraceptive rights, LGBTQ inclusion and same-sex marriage, promoting open, respectful dialogues on these subjects. Her advocacy for LGBTQ leadership came after a particularly difficult time in the PCUSA regarding support for LGBTQ ordination and was Influenced by her daughter, Kathryn, who came out as a lesbian in the 1980s. As a well-known church leader, her support for organizations such as More Light Presbyterians—an organization that championed full participation of LGBTQ people in the church—was considered an asset.

== Scholarship and educational work ==
Poethig's scholarship focused on two main interests, studied in historical and contemporary contexts: the role of music in spiritual life and the role of women in the Presbyterian church. After her initial work supporting local compositions of Filipino hymns, she turned to early biblical liturgies in her PhD dissertation, The Victory Song Tradition of the Women of Israel (1985). It was the first work to identify and study (through the songs of Miriam and Deborah) the discrete, critical role that women played in structuring postwar experience in ancient Israelite life; it is an often-cited contribution to Hebrew biblical scholarship on gender and ethnomusicology, alongside work by others such as Susan Ackerman and Carol Meyers. Poethig extended her research in her booklet, Sing, Shout, and Clap for Joy: a Study of Psalms in Worship (1989) and articles such as "Prayer and Praise in Ancient Israel," which appeared in the journal Liturgy. In 1998, she created a Stony Point Center seminar, "Weaving Theology and Music With the Events of Our Times."

Poethig also produced research, writing, curriculum and conferences on ministry, structural and social change within the church, and women clergy. These works include the books 150 Plus Tomorrow: Churches Plan for the Future (1982) and Good News Women: 150 Years of Ecumenical Mission (1987), which focuses on ten women difference-makers. She wrote articles for The Presbyterian Outlook, Church & Society, and Horizons, among others, on Bible study and the ordination of women, charting its growth from nominal levels at the outset of her career to 30% representation in the PC(USA) by 2006. She also produced research and conference papers on women's historical contributions to mission enterprises and efforts to raise the status of women worldwide, and their struggle for equality.
