= Larry D. Nichols =

American puzzle designer

- Larry D. Nichols with his Pocket Cube.
- Born: December 27, 1939; Xenia, Ohio, U.S.
- Education: DePauw University; Harvard Graduate School
- Occupations: Inventor, chemist
- Employer(s): Moleculon Research Corporation of Cambridge, Massachusetts
- Known for: Puzzle designer, inventor
- Title: Chief scientist

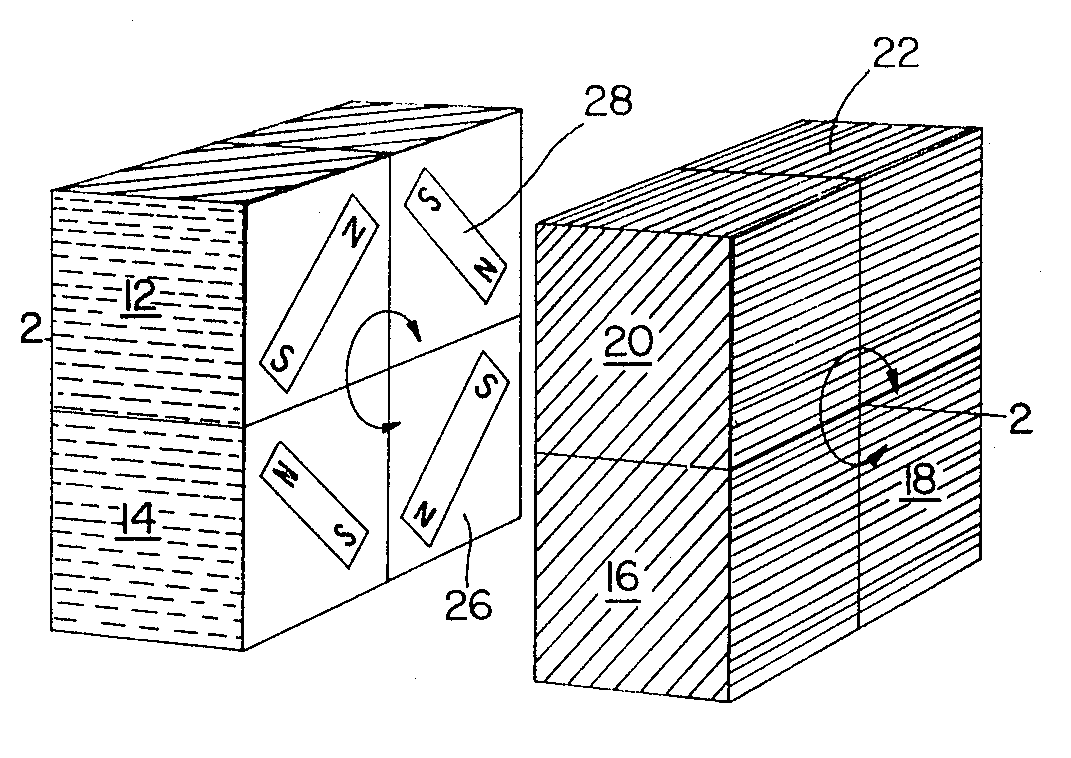
Diagram from Nichols' patent showing a cube held together with magnets

Pocket Cube animation.

Larry D. Nichols (born December 27, 1939) is an American puzzle designer. He grew up in Xenia, Ohio, and studied chemistry at DePauw University in Greencastle, Indiana, before moving to Massachusetts to attend Harvard Graduate School. He is best known for the invention of mechanical puzzles such as "The Nichols Cube Puzzle" (1972), patent US3655201.

== The Nichols Cube Puzzle (Twizzle) ==
In 1957, 17 years before Dr. Rubik's invention popularly known as the “Rubik's Cube”, Dr. Nichols conceived of a twist cube puzzle with six colored faces. It was a 2×2×2 cube assembled from eight unit cubes with magnets on their inside faces, allowing the cubes to rotate in groups of four around three axes. The object of the puzzle was to mix the colors on the faces of the cube and then restore them.

After making many preliminary models, in 1968 a working prototype was constructed, and on April 11, 1972, U.S. patent 3,655,201 was issued covering the Nichols' Cube. The patent focused on the 2×2×2 puzzle but mentioned the possibility of larger versions.

Nichols' patents became the subject of a court hearing between his employer and the Ideal Toy Company. In 1985, a U.S. District Court ruled that Rubik's Cube infringed the Nichols patent, but in 1986 the Court of Appeals ruled that only the smaller 2×2×2 Rubik's Pocket Cube was guilty of infringement, and not the popular 3×3×3 Rubik's Cube.

=== Analogues of the invention ===
- Manipulative toy William O Gustafson 1960
- Rubik's Cube 1974
- Frank Fox got a British patent for a spherical sliding puzzle in 1974
- Terutoshi Ishige received a Japanese patent for a 3x3x3 in 1976

== Career ==
Nichols received a degree in chemistry in 1958 from DePauw University, where he was a Rector Scholar, and went on to earn a doctorate at Harvard. As a Harvard student, he invented and produced games and puzzles. He became chief scientist for the Moleculon Research Corporation of Cambridge, Massachusetts, and invented one of its primary products, Poroplastic, in 1973. Poroplastic film has the mechanical properties of a typical plastic, but is able to hold large quantities of almost any liquid within tiny pores. Usage of Poroplastic materials centers on controlled drug delivery and environmental health and safety products.

== Personal Life ==
He has lived with his wife Karen in Arlington, Massachusetts since 1959.

== See also ==
Arthur S. Obermayer was the founder-owner of Moleculon Research Corporation where Nichols was Chief Scientist. Obermayer encouraged and helped to patent the Nichols Cube.
