= Schulte United Building =

Building in Los Angeles, California

- U.S. Historic district – Contributing property
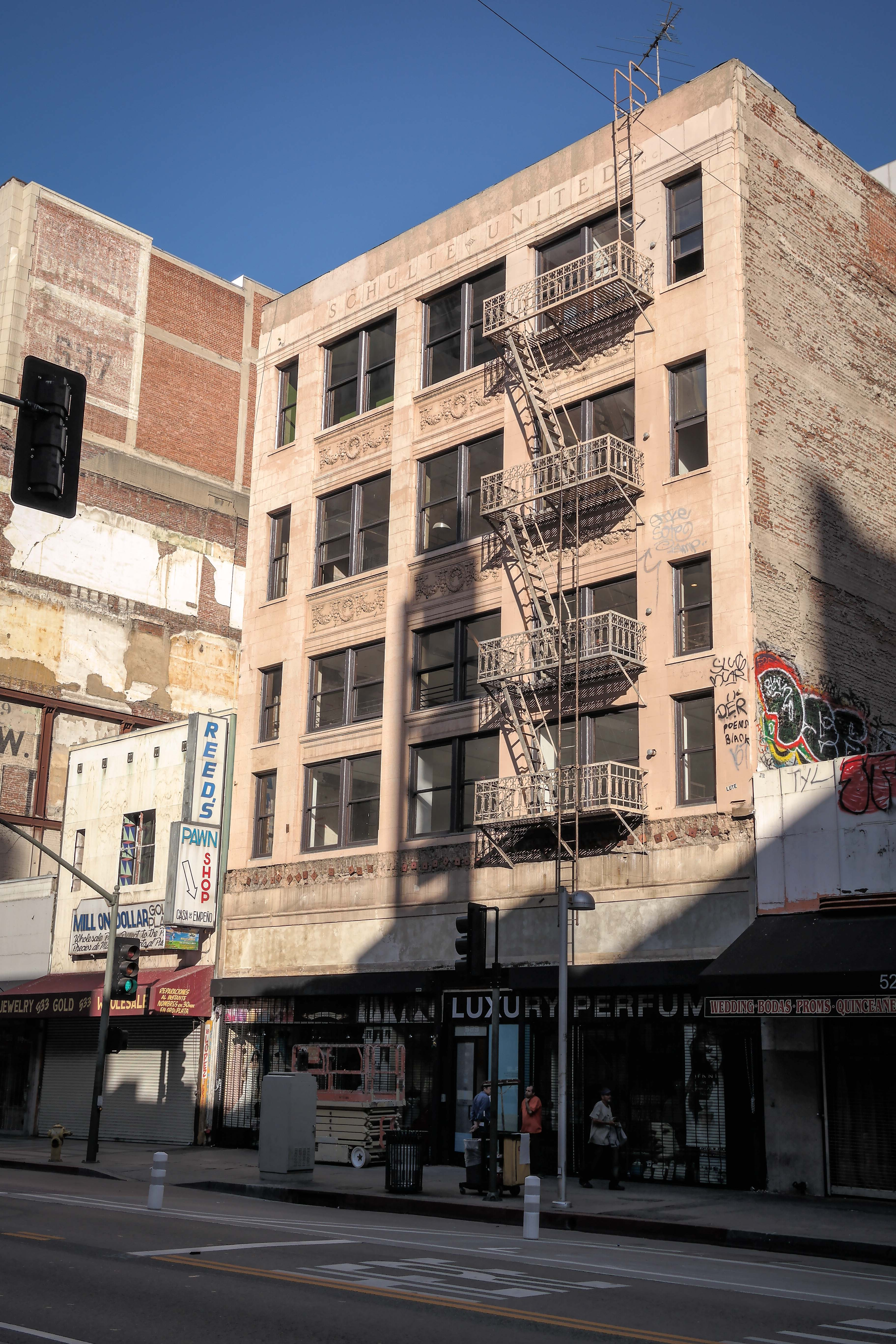
- The building in 2014

- Location within the Los Angeles metropolitan area
- Location: 529 S. Broadway, Los Angeles, California
- Coordinates: 34°02′52″N 118°15′06″W
- Built: 1928
- Part of: Broadway Theater and Commercial District (ID79000484)
- Designated CP: May 9, 1979

Schulte United Building, also known as Broadway Arts Tower and Broadway Interiors, is a historic five-story building located at 529 S. Broadway in the Jewelry District and Broadway Theater District in the historic core of downtown Los Angeles.

== History ==
Schulte United Building, built in 1928, was originally home to the Schulte United department store and a 125-seat cafeteria. Schulte United vacated the building upon its bankruptcy in the 1960s, and the upper stores remained vacant for the next four decades.

In 1979, the Broadway Theater and Commercial District was added to the National Register of Historic Places, with this building listed as a contributing property in the district.

After the building was bought in 2012, an additional $2 million ($2.8 million in 2025) was spent converting the interior to offices. This conversion, first of the Historic Commercial Reuse Initiative meant to revitalize the dormant historic buildings on Broadway, was completed in 2014, at which point the building was renamed Broadway Arts Tower. Also in 2014, the building was awarded $15,489 ($21,065 in 2025) through the Bringing Back Broadway initiative to buy decorative fluted hood lights to illuminate its top-floor signage.

== Architecture and design ==
Schulte United Building is made of brick and concrete and features a flat facade with terra cotta ornamentation. The building's interior features brickwork, hardwood floors, a tin ceiling, and a large staircase with bronze inlays and brass handrails.

Much of the building, including the facade, brickwork, ceiling, and hardwood floors, were restored when the building was converted to offices in 2014. Additionally, non-original paint was removed from the staircase, a new elevator was added, and the original elevator was converted to a "glass well" skylight.

== See also ==
- List of contributing properties in the Broadway Theater and Commercial District
