= Lori White =

American academic and administrator

Lori S. White

21st President of the DePauw University
- Incumbent
- Assumed office July 1, 2020
- Preceded by: D. Mark McCoy

Personal details
- Relatives: Joseph White (father); Lisa White (sister)
- Education: University of California, Berkeley (BA); Stanford University (PhD)

Academic background
- Thesis: Hanging Black: Social and psychological factors influencing Black student participation in Black campus organizations at a historically White university (1995)
- Doctoral advisor: Patricia J. Gumport

Academic work
- Discipline: Education
- Institutions: DePauw University; Washington University in St. Louis; Southern Methodist University; Stanford University; University of Southern California; San Diego State University

Lori White is an American academic and administrator who has served as president of DePauw University in Greencastle, Indiana, since 2020. She was previously the vice chancellor of student affairs at Washington University in St. Louis. She is the first woman and first person of color to serve as president of DePauw University.

== Early life and education ==
White has a bachelor's degree in English and psychology from University of California, Berkeley and her doctorate in education administration and policy analysis from Stanford University.

== Career ==
White has held administrative and academic positions at Southern Methodist University, Stanford University, University of Southern California and San Diego State University. In 2015, she became vice chancellor of student affairs Washington University in St. Louis.

In July 2020, she became the president of DePauw University. She is the first woman and first person of color to serve as president of DePauw University.

== Personal life ==
White's father was the Black psychologist Joseph L. White and her sister is paleontologist Lisa White.
