= Lisa White (geologist) =

American paleontologist

Lisa D. White
- Citizenship: American
- Education: San Francisco State University (BA), University of California Santa Cruz (PhD)
- Known for: micropaleontology, STEM education, science outreach
- Scientific career
- Fields: micropaleontology
- Workplaces: San Francisco State University, University of California Museum of Paleontology
- Website: https://ucmp.berkeley.edu/people/lisa-white/

Lisa D. White is an American geologist and director of Education and Outreach at the University of California Museum of Paleontology. White is a former professor of geosciences and associate dean of the College of Science and Engineering at San Francisco State University. She was elected to the California Academy of Sciences in 2000 and as a Fellow of the Geological Society of America in 2009. White was awarded her PhD in 1989 from the University of California, Santa Cruz. In 2022 the National Center for Science Education (NCSE) presented White with the 2022 "Friend of Darwin" award.

== Education ==
White studied for a BA in geology at San Francisco State University. She worked as an intern at the United States Geological Survey in college. In 1989, she was awarded her PhD in Earth Sciences from the University of California, Santa Cruz. White's doctoral research focused on fossil diatoms in the Miocene Monterey Formation.

== Career ==
White was a professor of geosciences at San Francisco State University where she also served as the Associate Dean of the College of Science and Engineering from 2008 to 2012. In 2005, White was a visiting geology department professor at the University of New Orleans, where she mentored students and helped to promote opportunities for geoscience majors at college to African Americans. Since 2012 she has been the director for education and outreach at the Museum of Paleontology, University of California Berkeley. White was elected as a Fellow of the California Academy of Sciences in 2000 and a Fellow of the Geological Society of America in 2009.

White has been active in efforts to increase diversity in the geosciences throughout her career. White coordinated the Minority Participation in the Earth Sciences program (MPES) with the US Geological Survey from 1988 to 1995. She led programs for the National Science Foundation METALS (Minority Education Through Traveling and Learning in the Sciences) program from 2010 to 2015, where she partnered with faculty from the University of Texas at El Paso, the University of New Orleans, and Purdue University to bring ethnically diverse high school students on experiential education trips to geologic field sites across the United States. Since 2017, she has served as a Co-PI on the National Science Foundation FIELD program (Fieldwork Inspiring Expanded Leadership and Diversity). The program's goal is to create more accessible, culturally sensitive, and inclusive field experiences, particularly for students underrepresented in the geosciences. In 2000, White was appointed Chair of the Geological Society of America committee on Minorities and Women in the Geosciences. In 2019 White became the Chair of the Diversity and Inclusion Advisory Committee of the American Geophysical Union. White received the first Bromery Award from the Geological Society of America in 2008 in recognition of her work with minorities in the field.

White has also been active in science education and outreach work throughout her academic career. In 1994, she supervised the NASA Sharp-Plus program at San Francisco State in 1994. She was the Project Director and Principal Investigator (PI) of the SF-ROCKS (Reaching Out to Communities and Kids with Science in San Francisco) to bring geoscience education to high school students and teachers in San Francisco. This program, funded by the National Science Foundation, was a partnership between San Francisco State University, City College of San Francisco, local high schools from the San Francisco Unified School District, local community groups and government agencies. White has been featured on Bill Nye the Science Guy and in the PBS documentary Making North America in 2015. She continues her public outreach work through her current position as Director of Education and Outreach at the University of California Museum of Paleontology. National Center for Science Education (NCSE) presented White with the 2022 "Friend of Darwin" award. Executive director Ann Reid stated, "And the importance of Lisa White's efforts to help science educators teach evolution effectively can't be overstated," citing in particular her leadership on the Understanding Evolution website."

== Selected publications ==
- White, L. D., R.E. Garrison, and J.A. Barron. 1992. Miocene intensification of upwelling along the California margin as recorded in siliceous facies of the Monterey Formation and offshore DSDP sites. Geological Society, London, Special Publications 64.1: 429–442.
- White, L.D., and P.A. Holroyd. 2018. Transfer of the San Francisco State University collection to the University of California Museum of Paleontology. Journal of Paleontology 93(1): 196.
- White, L., and R. Bell. 2019. Why diversity matters to AGU, Eos 100, doi:10.1029/2019EO136457
- Ellwood, E.R., Sessa, J.A., Abraham, J.K., Budden, A.E., Douglas, N., Guralnick, R., Krimmel, E., Langen, T., Linton, D., Phillips, M., Soltis, P.S., Studer, M., White, L.D., Williams, J., Monfils, A.K., 2020. Biodiversity Science and the Twenty-First Century Workforce, BioScience, Vol. 70 No. 2. doi:10.1093/biosci/biz147
