= Donald Bruce Kaufman =

American entrepreneur

- Born: May 7, 1922; Detroit, Michigan, U.S.
- Died: January 4, 1983 (aged 60); Camarillo, California, U.S.
- Monuments: Donald Bruce Kaufman branch of the Los Angeles Public Library in Brentwood, Los Angeles
- Occupations: Home Builder, Co-founder KB Home
- Spouse: Glorya Pinkis (m. 1954)
- Children: 4

Donald Bruce Kaufman (May 7, 1922 – January 4, 1983) was an American home builder and entrepreneur who with Eli Broad co-founded Kaufman & Broad, now known as KB Home (NYSE: KBH), in 1957.

== Early life ==
Donald Bruce Kaufman was born in Detroit, Michigan in 1922, the third child of immigrant parents from Russia. His father was a finish carpenter and his mother was ill most of her life with tuberculosis. Donald was moved around to live with different family members most of his young life.

== Career ==
At the end of World War II he joined the Air Force and became a cadet. Though he never saw action, he did learn to fly an airplane. After his service, he gathered some of his friends and started a business framing houses in Detroit. He later started a contracting company he called ABCO, named so as it would be the first company listed under contractors in the telephone book. The business received a lot of work after the Korean war, with men returning to the States and needing homes for their growing families. He later renamed the business Cordell Construction Co.

In 1957, Kaufman joined with Eli Broad and co-founded Kaufman & Broad, now known as KB Home (NYSE: KBH). With limited resources, Kaufman handled production, purchasing quality, and material control and Broad did the financial detail and administration work. Kaufman also devised a method to build homes on cement slabs, which enabled the firm to make a heavy impact on the Detroit market at a time of dwindling demand and high competition for home buyers. The company expanded to Arizona in 1962 and into California in 1963 and was the first U.S. homebuilder to expand into France in 1967.

In 1965, the Detroit News noted: "Detroit’s building boom has brought Donald Kaufman out of semi-retirement and back from California to lend a strong hand to the business that started here and grew into a nationwide, multi-million dollar operation in only eight years." Detroit News went on to state how Kaufman could build a three bedroom house with a basement in the cold winter, plowing thru the ice in Detroit Michigan and on the seventh day, customers were talking to the salesmen while walking through a new, furnished home. Several years later Kaufman eliminated basements and built the new houses on cement slabs. This lowered the cost of the homes and Kaufman and Broad became the most successful home builders in the United States and France.

Kaufman and Broad Home Corporation went on to become the first publicly traded home building company on the NYSE.

== Personal life ==
In 1954, Kaufman married Glorya Kaufman (Pinkis). They had four children. Donald and his son-in-law, Eyal Horwitz, both died in a plane crash on January 4, 1983.

In 1994, Glorya Kaufman, family members, and friends made donations for the construction of the 10,040-square-foot Donald Bruce Kaufman branch of the Los Angeles Public Library in Brentwood, Los Angeles.
