= USC Kaufman School of Dance =

Dance school in California, US

Coordinates: 34.0234723°N 118.2874791°W

USC Glorya Kaufman School of Dance
- Motto: The New Movement
- Type: Private
- Established: 2015
- Parent institution: University of Southern California
- Dean: Julia M. Ritter
- Location: Los Angeles, California, United States
- Website: kaufman.usc.edu

The USC Glorya Kaufman School of Dance (commonly referred to as Kaufman) is a private dance school at the University of Southern California in Los Angeles, California. The school offers a Bachelor of Fine Arts degree and minors in dance.

== History ==
In 2012, philanthropist Glorya Kaufman gifted several millions to the University of Southern California to create the Glorya Kaufman School of Dance. The Kaufman School was the university's first new school in 40 years. Glorya Kaufman has made many donations to advance dance education, including to the University of California, Los Angeles and the Juilliard School. She chose to donate to the University of Southern California so she could create a Bachelor of Fine Arts dance program at a private university with excellent control over quality, and to help establish Los Angeles as an international cultural center of dance. The gift was used to construct the Glorya Kaufman International Dance Center and to endowing the new school.

Beginning in the fall of 2015, the Glorya Kaufman School of Dance opened to students offering a Bachelor of Fine Arts degree in dance as well as individual classes in technique, performance, choreography, production, theory and history open to all students at USC. Robert Cutietta, the dean of the USC Thornton School of Music, was selected to be the inaugural dean of the Kaufman School of Dance. Jodie Gates, a leader in dance in Southern California, was appointed as the vice dean and director of the school.

== Glorya Kaufman International Dance Center ==
The Glorya Kaufman International Dance Center is the primary facility of the USC Kaufman School of Dance, located in the University of Southern California's University Park Campus. The $46 million building opened on October 5, 2016, a year after the school opened to students. It is a two-story, 54,000-square-foot building designed for just 80 students. The dance center houses a performance studio, five rehearsal studios, a training and fitness area, dressing rooms, classrooms, and offices.
