= Carmen Clemente Travieso =

Venezuelan journalist (1900–1983)

- Born: 24 July 1900; Caracas, Venezuela
- Died: 24 January 1983 (aged 82); Caracas, Venezuela
- Occupations: journalist, suffrage activist, human rights activist
- Years active: 1930–1977

Carmen Clemente Travieso (24 July, 1900–24 January, 1983) was a Venezuelan journalist and women's rights activist. She was the first graduate of the Central University of Venezuela as a reporter and one of the first women employed as a full-time journalist in Venezuela. She was one of the earliest group of women who joined the Communist Party of Venezuela and worked actively for women's suffrage. She was a co-founder of an organization in favor of prison reform and a co-founder of the Venezuelan Association of Journalists.

== Biography ==
Carmen Clemente Travieso was born on 24 July 1900 in Caracas, Venezuela to Mercedes Eugenia Travieso and Lino Clemente. Her father died in her childhood and she was raised in the home of her maternal grandmother along with her four other siblings. At age seventeen, she accompanied an aunt to New York City, where she took English classes and worked in the embroidery factory of the Bucilla Corporation. She also began her involvement with women's rights and became an activist for helping those afflicted with leprosy.

Returning to Caracas in 1927, Clemente became involved with the student movement to oust the dictator Juan Vicente Gómez. While working in the library of Rudolph Dolge, she joined the "Madrinas de Guerra", a group of women who brought food and medical supplies to students and prisoners of the conflict. She also became involved with Juan Bautista Fuenmayor, Kotepa Delgado and Rodolfo Quintero, who founded the Communist Party of Venezuela. She helped them establish a study center to disseminate their ideas and a year later organized the first drive to admit women to the party. In 1932, she began writing for the underground paper El Martillo and would continue collaborating with it until 1941.

Clemente became the first woman reporter to graduate from Central University of Venezuela (Spanish: Universidad Central de Venezuela) (UCV). In 1936, she joined the Agrupación Cultural Femenina (Women's Cultural Association) and published articles in Ahora, La Esfera and El Nacional about legal inequalities and the need for child-protection laws. She served as director of the organization for the next decade and served as the head of the journal La Cultura de la Mujer. Throughout the 1930s, she wrote articles on hygiene, homeless children, women's equality and lack of rights as well as cultural analysis on social problems. In 1937, she was a founder of the Liga Nacional Pro-Presos (National League in Support of Prisoners), which sought prison reform.

In 1940, Clemente helped organize the First National Women's Conference held between 11 and 13 June, to create constitutional and civil code reforms for women to attain legal and political parity. The following year, she was one of the co-founders of the Venezuelan Association of Journalists. In 1945, she held meetings in her home for a second congress of women seeking the vote. They gained the support of President Isaías Medina Angarita, but a coup d'état removed him from power. She was nominated as the Communist party's candidate to the 1946 constitutional convention, which in 1947 granted suffrage to all citizens over the age of eighteen. Some in the women's movement believed that their work was done, but Clemente believed civil and economic legal changes still needed to be addressed.

In 1950, the communist party was outlawed after another coup. Clemente published Mujeres venezolanas y otros reportajes (Venezuelan Women and other reportings) which strongly spoke of the repression of rights of women. The following year, she joined the resistance against the dictatorship, holding clandestine meetings in her home. She continued to publish, and in 1953 issued the biography of Teresa Carreño. Clemente was interrogated in 1957 during continued political unrest, but the following year, after the long period of censorship, she and other journalists were able begin writing for newspapers which had been banned during the previous decade. She continued publishing until the 1970s. Clemente died on 24 January 1983 in Caracas.

== Selected works ==
- Luisa Cáceres de Arismendi (ensayo biográfico) (1942)
- Mujeres venezolanas y otros reportajes (1951)
- Teresa Carreño, 1853–1917; ensayo biográfico (1953)
- Las esquinas de Caracas: sus leyendas, sus recuerdos (1956)
- Las luchas de la mujer venezolana (1961)
- Mujeres de la independencia. (Seis biografías de mujeres venezolanas) (1964)
- Anécdotas y legendas de la vieja Caracas (1971)
- Las mujeres en el pasado y en el presente (1977)
