= KB Home =

American homebuilding company

- Formerly: Kaufman and Broad Home Corporation
- Type: Public
- Traded as: NYSE: KBH; S&P 400 component
- Industry: Homebuilding
- Founded: 1957; 69 years ago
- Founders: Donald Bruce Kaufman; Eli Broad
- Headquarters: Westwood, Los Angeles, California, U.S.
- Key people: Robert McGibney (President and CEO) Jeffrey T. Mezger (Executive chairman of the board)
- Revenue: ▲US$6.93 billion (2024)
- Operating income: ▲US$764 million (2024)
- Net income: ▲US$655 million (2024)
- Total assets: ▲US$6.94 billion (2024)
- Total equity: ▲US$4.06 billion (2024)
- Number of employees: 2,384 (2024)
- Website: www.kbhome.com

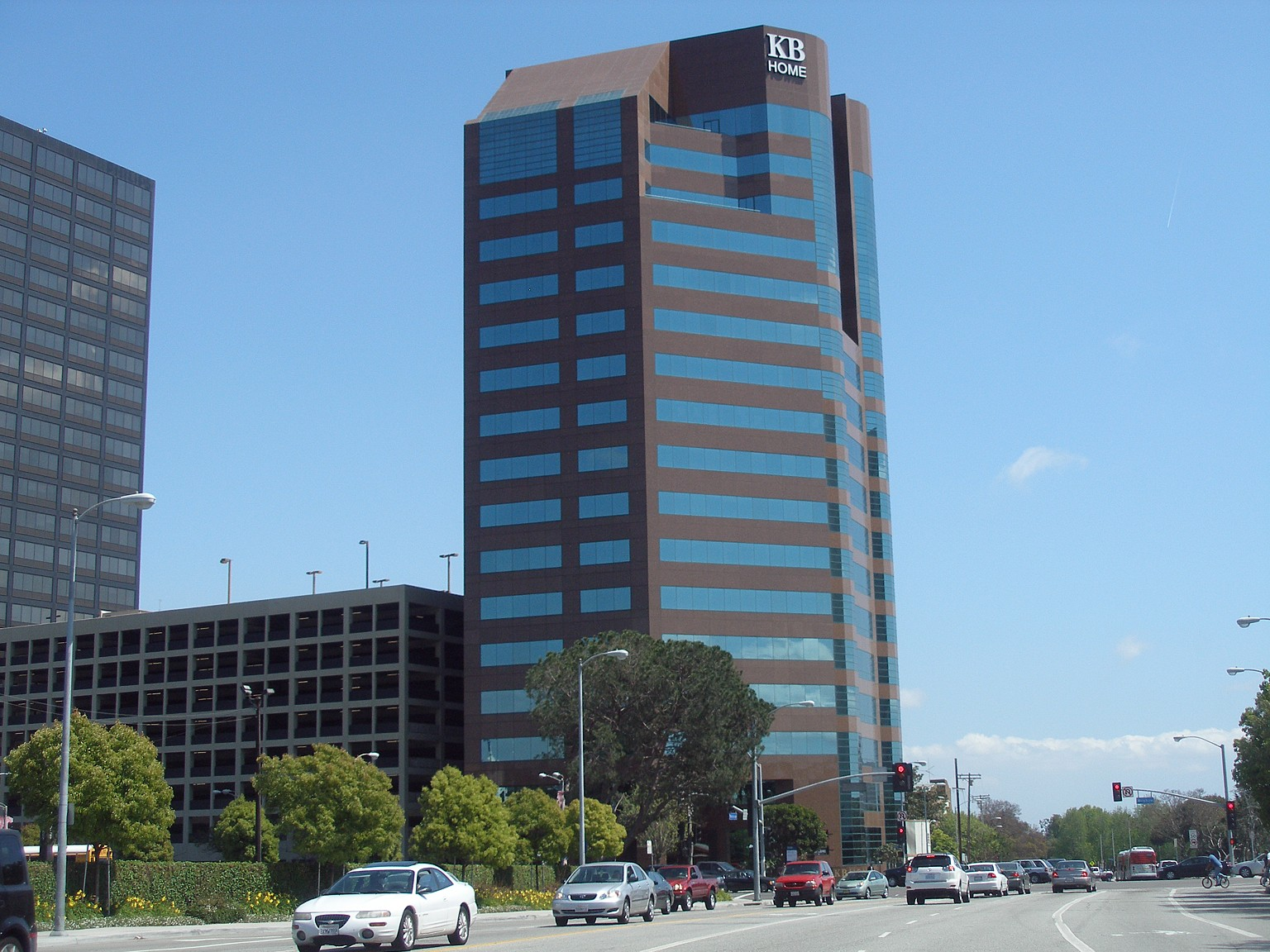
KB Home headquarters in the Westwood district of Los Angeles

KB Home is an American homebuilding company founded in 1957 as Kaufman & Broad in Detroit, Michigan. It was the first company to be traded on the New York Stock Exchange as a home builder. Its headquarters are in Los Angeles, California and will be moved to Tempe, Arizona in 2027.

The company has built 600,000 homes since its founding. It builds homes primarily for first-time home buyers.

== History ==
=== 1956–2007 ===
KB Home was founded in Detroit in 1956 by Donald Bruce Kaufman and Eli Broad. Their first venture together was the construction of two model homes in the Northeast Detroit suburbs, where a new generation of first-time home buyers were flocking. By streamlining the construction process and eliminating basements, offering a carport instead, they could price the houses so the monthly mortgage would be less than the rent for a two-bedroom apartment. Kaufman and Broad christened this model the "Award Winner" and priced it at $13,700. After one weekend, seventeen were sold and within two years, Kaufman and Broad had built 600 homes in the Detroit suburbs.

In 1960, fearing that the Detroit economy was too dependent on the automotive business, they moved to Phoenix, Arizona and expanded into California in 1963, and in 1967 were the first U.S. homebuilders to expand into France. The company completed an initial public offering in 1986, and from that time was known as Kaufman and Broad Home Corporation until 2001, when its name was shortened to KB Home.

The company has periodically acquired other homebuilders as it expanded into new markets. These purchases included New Mexico-based Opnel Jenkins in 1995, San Antonio-based Rayco Homes in 1996, Tucson, Arizona-based Estes Homes in 1998, and Upland, California-based Colony Homes in 2003. It also maintained a division in France, which was sold in 2007.

As part of a promotion, in 1997 the company built a life-sized replica of The Simpsons cartoon home in Henderson, Nevada. It has since engaged in homebuilding promotions with Martha Stewart (2005), The Walt Disney Company (2008) and The Ellen DeGeneres Show (2012).

In 2001 KB Home was sued when homeowners in a subdivision in Arlington, Texas discovered that their homes were built on top of a practice bombing range from the 1940s and 50s which the military had cleared for development. That suit has since been settled. The Army Corps of Engineers was engaged in remediation.

In November 2006, KB Home president, CEO, and chairman Bruce Karatz resigned after an internal accounting probe into his alleged backdating of stock options. KB Home also announced the resignation of its head of human resources, Gary A. Ray, and the resignation of its chief legal officer, Richard B. Hirst. The company determined that Karatz and Ray had picked grant dates under the company's stock option plans. According to the Wall Street Journal, Karatz was one of the most highly paid executives in 2005, earning almost $156 million, primarily from options.

In 2006, Karatz was succeeded by Jeffrey T. Mezger as CEO.

=== 2008–present ===
In March 2011, KB Home, in partnership with SunPower, introduced its first community with solar as a standard feature.

In fiscal year 2012, the company delivered 6,282 homes in the United States and had revenue of over $1.5 billion. This revenue figure is down from 2005 (at the height of the real estate boom), when the company delivered close to 40,000 homes and had more than $9 billion in revenue.

In 2016 KB Home settled a multi-million dollar lawsuit with the Florida Attorney General's Office for shoddy and defective construction repairs on homes that were built wrong in the first place.

In November 2022, the company announced it had established the first all-electric solar and battery-powered microgrid community in California.

In October 2023, KB Home announced that it is moving forward to build 800 homes on San Jose’s Communications Hill.

In March 2026, Robert McGibney became President and CEO of KB Home. An almost-26-year veteran of the company, McGibney succeeded Jeffrey T. Mezger, who transitioned to Executive Chairman of the Board.
