= DePauw University =

Private liberal arts college in Greencastle, Indiana, US

- Latin: Universitatis Depavensis
- Former name: Indiana Asbury College (1837–1884)
- Motto: Latin: Decus lumenque reipublicae collegium
- Motto in English: The college is the splendor and light of the common good
- Type: Private liberal arts college
- Established: 1837; 189 years ago
- Religious affiliation: United Methodist Church
- Academic affiliations: NAICU; CIC; Annapolis Group; Oberlin Group; CLAC; GLCA; IAMSCU
- Endowment: $1.1 Billion (2026)
- President: Lori S. White
- Faculty: 209 (fall 2023)
- Students: 1,819 (fall 2023)
- Location: Greencastle, Indiana, U.S. 39°38′27″N 86°51′47″W
- Campus: Small town, 655 acres (265 ha)
- Colors: Black & gold
- Nickname: Tigers
- Sporting affiliations: NCAA Division III – NCAC
- Mascot: Tyler the Tiger
- Website: depauw.edu

DePauw University (/dəˈpɔː/ də-PAW) is a private liberal arts college in Greencastle, Indiana, United States. It was founded in 1837 as Indiana Asbury College and changed its name to DePauw University in 1884. The college has a Methodist heritage and was founded to be an ecumenical institution of national stature, "conducted on the most liberal principles, accessible to all religious denominations and designed for the benefit of our citizens in general".

In 2026, DePauw had an enrollment of 1,801 students. Its residential campus is located 45 miles (72 km) west of Indianapolis and is spread across 175 acres (71 ha) and 36 buildings, with an additional 520-acre (210 ha) DePauw Nature Park.

== History ==
Indiana Asbury University was founded in 1837 in Greencastle, Indiana, and was named after Francis Asbury, the first American bishop of the Methodist Episcopal Church. The people of Greencastle raised $25,000 to entice the Methodists to establish the college in Greencastle, which was little more than a village at the time. It was originally established as an all-men's school but began admitting women in 1867.

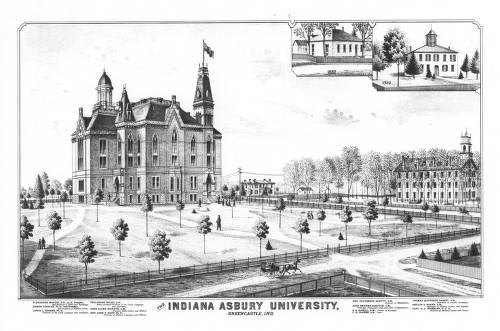
East College seen in the 1879 Atlas.

In 1884 Indiana Asbury University changed its name to DePauw University in honor of Washington C. DePauw, who made a sequence of substantial donations throughout the 1870s, which culminated in his largest single donation that established the School of Music during 1884. Before his death in 1887, DePauw donated over $600,000 to Indiana Asbury, equal to around $17 million in 2021. In 2002, the school received the largest-ever gift to a liberal arts college, $128 million by the Holton family. Subsequently, in 2024, DePauw received a $200 million gift that combined a $150 million anonymous donation with an additional $50 million in matching funds from other donors.

Sigma Delta Chi, known today as the Society of Professional Journalists, was founded at the college in 1909 by a group of student journalists, including Eugene C. Pulliam. The world's first Greek-letter sorority, Kappa Alpha Theta, was also founded at DePauw in 1870. DePauw is home to the two longest continually running fraternity chapters in the world: the Delta chapter of Beta Theta Pi and the Lambda chapter of Phi Gamma Delta.

During World War II, DePauw University was one of 131 colleges and universities nationally that took part in the V-12 Navy College Training Program which offered students a path to a Navy commission.

As of July 2020, Lori White, previously vice chancellor for student affairs at Washington University in St. Louis, is the 21st president of DePauw University. White is the first woman and African American to serve as President of DePauw University.

== Campus ==
- East College of DePauw University
- U.S. National Register of Historic Places
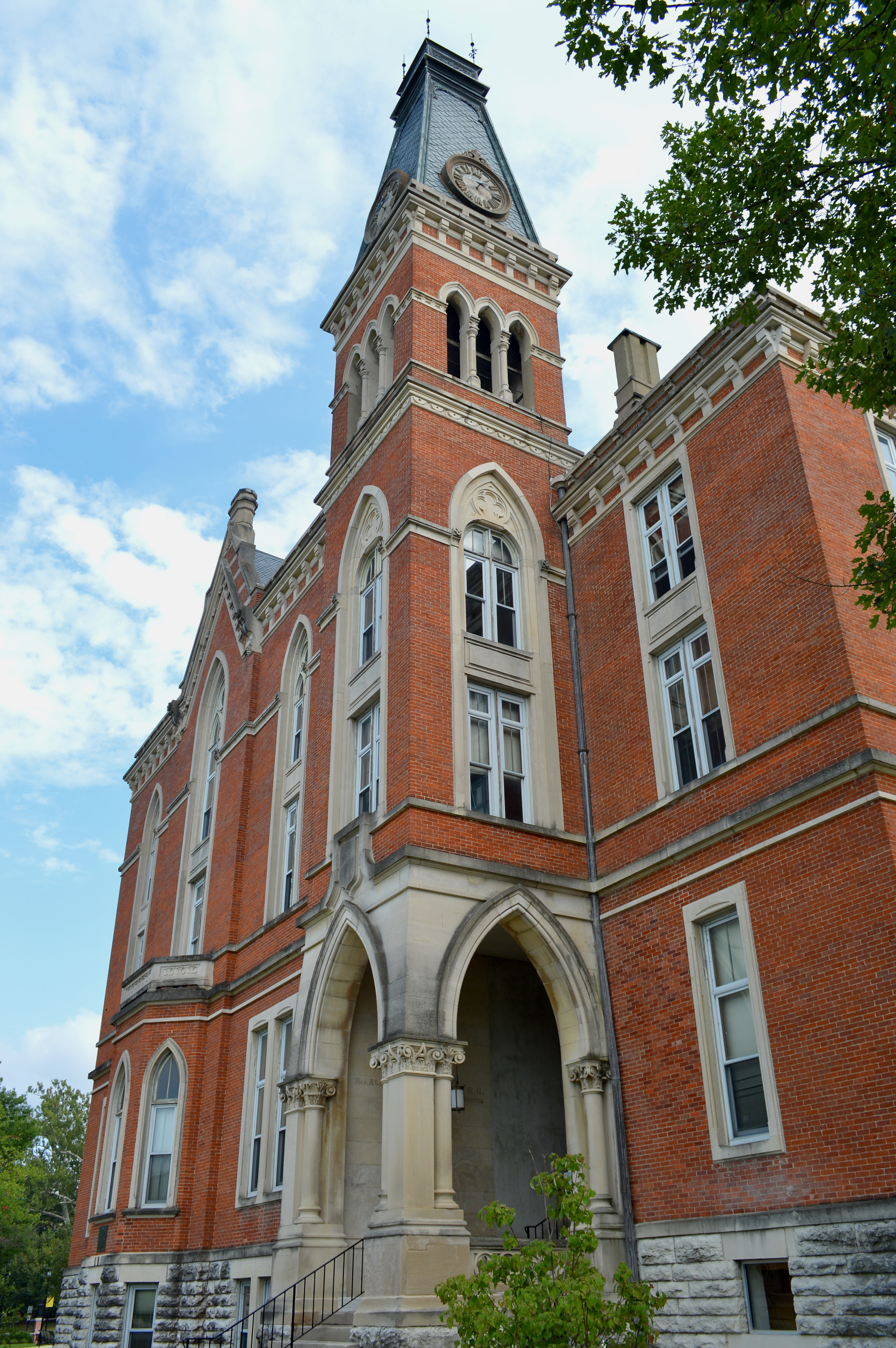
- Tower of East College
- Location: 300 Simpson St., Greencastle, Indiana
- Area: 4 acres (1.6 ha)
- Built: 1869
- NRHP reference No.: 75000047
- Added to NRHP: September 25, 1975

DePauw University is located approximately 45 mi (72 km) west of Indianapolis. Its campus consists of 36 major buildings spread out over a 695-acre (281 ha) campus that includes a 520-acre (210 ha) nature park, and there are 11 residence halls, 4 theme houses, and 31 college-owned houses and apartments spread throughout the campus. The oldest building on campus, East College, was built in 1877 and is listed on the National Register of Historic Places. DePauw also owns McKim Observatory.

Centrally located, the cornerstone for the building was laid on October 20, 1871. The building hosted commencement exercises in June 1874, and in September 1875 all college classes were moved to the building, according to the book, DePauw Through the Years. But work on East College continued until 1882 when the building's basement was completed. East College was placed on the National Register of Historic Places in 1975.

DePauw's Roy O. West Library holdings include approximately 350,000 books; 22,000 videos; 1,000 print periodical titles; access to over 20,000 electronic titles; 450,000 government documents; newspapers; and online databases.

== Academics ==
DePauw's liberal arts education gives students a chance to gain general knowledge beyond their direct area of study by taking classes outside their degrees and engaging in Winter Term classes and trips. Its most popular majors, by 2021 graduates, were econometrics and quantitative economics (83), speech communication and rhetoric (63), computer science (35), biochemistry (31), and psychology (27).

DePauw University's schedule is divided into a 4–1–4–1 calendar: besides the 15-week Autumn and Spring Semesters, there is also a 4-week Winter Term as well as a May Term. Students take one course during these terms, which are either used as a period for students to explore a subject of interest on campus or participate in off-campus domestic or international internship programs, service trips, or international trips and field studies. One survey of DePauw students found that over 80% of DePauw graduates studied abroad.

DePauw University has a student-faculty ratio of 10:1 and an average class size of 17 students.

=== Admissions ===
DePauw's admissions are considered "more selective" by U.S. News & World Report. As of 2023, the average newly enrolled student had a 3.97 GPA, an SAT score between 1160 and 1420, and an ACT score between 24 and 31. Besides standardized test scores, the university considers an applicant's GPA very important, high school class rank when available, and letters of recommendation important.

=== Reputation and rankings ===
Academic rankings

Liberal arts
- U.S. News & World Report: 50
- Washington Monthly: 56

National
- Forbes: 170
- WSJ/College Pulse: 116

In 2025, DePauw was ranked tied for 50th among liberal arts colleges in the United States by U.S. News & World Report. DePauw is ranked #170 on Forbes magazine's 2024 rankings, which include all colleges and universities in the United States. In 2024, Washington Monthly ranked DePauw 56th among 194 liberal arts colleges in the U.S. based on its contribution to the public good, as measured by social mobility, research, and promoting public service.

=== Institutes and programs ===
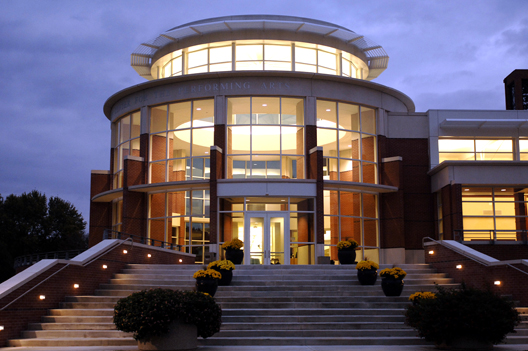
The Green Center for the Performing Arts houses the Institute of Music

Since 2007, the Prindle Institute has served as a place for reflection, discussion, and education. Prindle sponsors events related to ethics and provides opportunities for students, faculty, and staff to engage in discussions. The institute also publishes ethics related content through The Prindle Post and the Examining Ethics podcast.

DePauw University has one of the oldest private institutions for post-secondary music instruction in the country. Founded in 1884, the school has about 100 students. The student-to-teacher ratio is 10:1 with 71 per cent of classes having fewer than 20 students. The Institute of Music is housed inside the Green Center for Performing Arts (GCPA), constructed in 2007, which integrated and replaced parts of the former structure. The Institute of Music grants Bachelor of Arts as well as Bachelor of Musical Arts degrees. The latter allows students to add an emphasis on the music business. Effective 2024, School of Music was renamed the "Institute of Music" under the newly launched "Creative School". The name change does not impact accreditation.

Since 1919, the Rector Scholar Program has recognized DePauw students for academic achievement and character. More than 4,000 students have been named Rector Scholars. It is offered to the top academic applicants offered admission to DePauw. A limited number of full-tuition Presidential Rector Scholarships are available.

=== Society of Professional Journalists ===
On May 6, 1909, Sigma Delta Chi was founded by a group of DePauw University student journalists. The organization officially changed its name to the Society of Professional Journalists in 1988. Today it is the nation's most broad-based journalism organization, encouraging the free practice of journalism and stimulating high standards of ethical behavior. SPJ promotes the free flow of information vital to a well-informed citizenry; works to inspire and educate the next generation of journalists; and protects First Amendment guarantees of freedom of speech and press. In 2012, SPJ returned to the DePauw campus with the assistance of Eugene S. Pulliam Distinguished Visiting Professor of Journalism Mark Tatge "

=== Ubben Lecture series ===
Begun in 1986 and presented free of charge and open to all, Ubben Lecturers have included Malala Yousafzai, Bill Clinton, Benazir Bhutto, Margaret Thatcher, Jane Goodall, Tony Blair, TV's Jimmy Kimmel, Elie Wiesel, Colin Powell, Indianapolis Colts quarterback Andrew Luck, Spike Lee, Mikhail Gorbachev, Brad Stevens, and Condoleezza Rice have spoken. The Ubben Series has hosted 120 events in its 40-year history. After 40 years, the Ubben Lecture series concluded in April 2026 with Trevor Noah as its final speaker.

== Student life ==
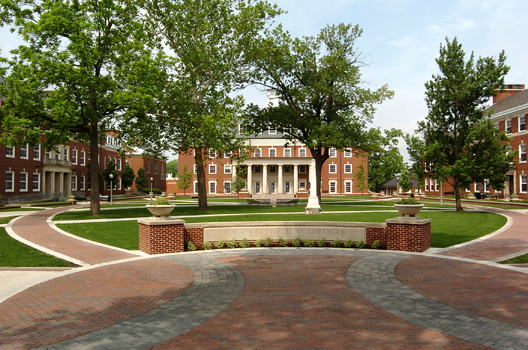
DePauw University academic quadrangle

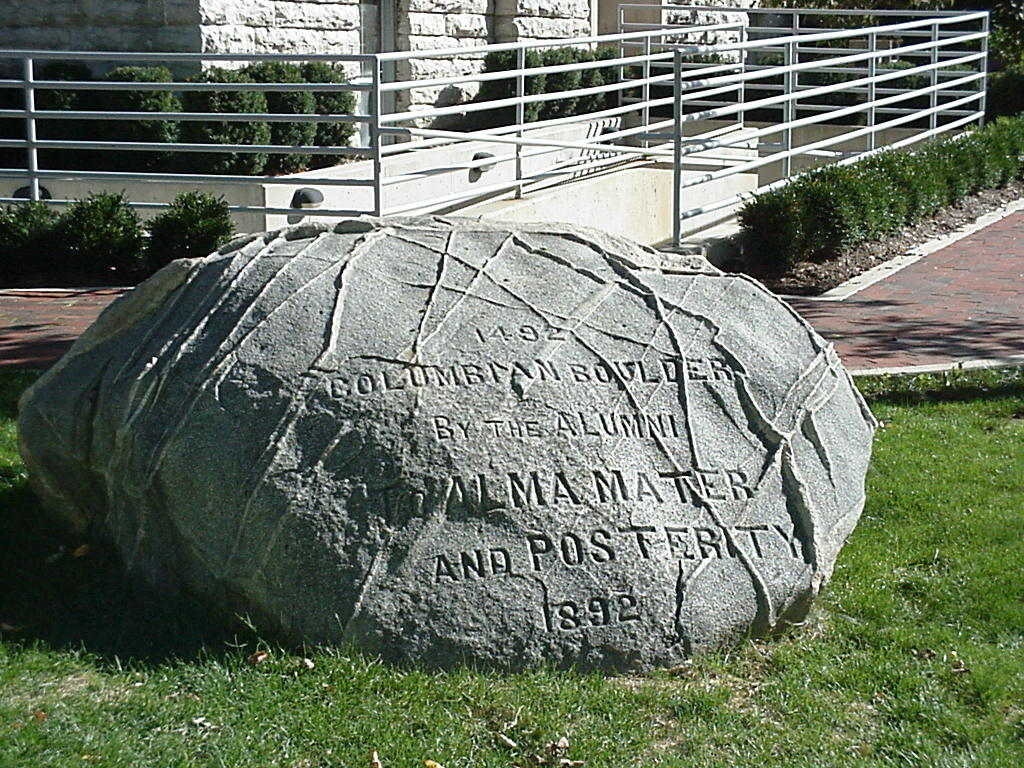
Boulder next to East College

DePauw offers more than 100 student organizations, including intramural sports, college and student-sponsored musical and theatrical productions, and local chapters of national organizations such as Circle K.

Many students engage in community service and other volunteer activities. Putnam County Relay For Life is organized by students and brings together the college and community.

The Boulder Run has become a tradition at DePauw University. Students, streaking from their respective residences, run to and from the Columbia Boulder, located in the center of the campus near the East College building. Another campus tradition, campus golf, requires a golf club and a tennis ball. Players attempt to hit their tennis ball against various targets on campus within a number of strokes.

=== Greek life ===
DePauw's Greek system began just eight years after the founding of Indiana Asbury College in 1837. Several chapters were founded in the 19th century. Women were first admitted to Indiana Asbury in 1867, and the first Greek-letter fraternity for women soon followed. Just under 70% of students at DePauw are affiliated with a Greek-letter organization. The Greek community consists of more than a dozen national social fraternities and approximately ten sororities. Some Greek-letter organizations were founded at DePauw.

In 2006, the Delta Zeta sorority chapter at DePauw University became embroiled in controversy for deactivating certain members based on their perceived attractiveness. The controversy made national headlines, resulting in the chapter's closing and various legal actions.

=== Media ===
The Pulliam Center for Contemporary Media houses the school's media facilities. This includes a student-run television station, radio station WGRE, newspaper, and two magazines. First published in 1852 as Asbury Notes, The DePauw is Indiana's oldest college newspaper. When school is in session, the Pulliam Center is open to students and faculty 24 hours a day, 7 days a week.

=== Music ===
The DePauw University Institute of Music presents regular recitals by students and faculty and concerts by visiting artists, most of which are free and open to the public.

DePauw students also organize concerts for the campus community. Performers in recent years have included Dave Matthews, Train, The Black Eyed Peas, Ben Folds, Rufus Wainwright, and Guster. Past guests have included Billy Joel, Smokey Robinson and the Miracles, The Carpenters, America, Yo-Yo Ma, and Harry Chapin.

== Athletics ==
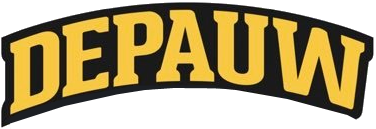
DePauw athletics logo

The DePauw Tigers compete in the NCAA Division III North Coast Athletic Conference (NCAC). Every year since 1890, DePauw University has competed in American football against its rival Wabash College in what has become the Monon Bell Classic. The traveling trophy, a 300-pound train bell from the Monon Railroad, made its debut in the rivalry in 1932.

The DePauw-Wabash series is one of the nation's oldest college football rivalries.

== Notable alumni and faculty ==
The college has a strong alumni network and a notable list of alumni including pioneering chemist Percy Lavon Julian, Angi Inc. founder Angie Hicks, astronaut Joseph P. Allen, Nobel laureate Ferid Murad, newspaper publisher Eugene C. Pulliam, director Chinonye Chukwu, best-selling author Barbara Kingsolver, Pulitzer recipient James B. Stewart, ESPN founder Bill Rasmussen, basketball coach and front office executive Brad Stevens, novelist Richard Peck, U.S. Vice President Dan Quayle, and 9/11 Commission Vice Chairman Lee Hamilton.

Notable faculty members include Sunil Sahu, professor of political science; Erik Wielenberg, professor of philosophy; and Ellen Maycock, professor emerita of mathematics.
