= 92.3 FM =

FM radio frequency

The following radio stations broadcast on FM frequency 92.3 MHz:

== Argentina ==
- AMA in Buenos Aires
- Ciudad in Resistencia, Chaco
- Dale in Campana, Buenos Aires
- Eco Radio in Rosario, Santa Fe
- Educativa in Río Gallegos, Santa Cruz
- Fenix in Ballesteros, Córdoba
- LRI757 FM92 in Roldán, Santa Fe
- Mística in La Plata, Buenos Aires
- Popular in Córdoba
- QSL in Mar del Plata, Buenos Aires
- Radio 10 Bahía Blanca in Bahía Blanca, Buenos Aires
- Radio María in Lomas del Mirador, Buenos Aires
- Radio María in Capilla del Monte, Córdoba
- Radio María in Colón, Entre Ríos

== Australia ==
- 2MCE in Bathurst, New South Wales
- 2YYY in Young, New South Wales
- ABC Mid North Coast in Grafton, New South Wales
- Vision Radio Network in Emerald, Queensland
- Triple J in Port Lincoln, South Australia
- 3ZZZ in Melbourne, Victoria

== Brunei ==
- Nasional (subsidiary of Radio Television Brunei)

== British Virgin Islands ==
- ZCBN at Tortola

== Canada (Channel 222) ==
- CBAF-FM-5 in Halifax, Nova Scotia
- CBAF-FM-12 in Margaree, Nova Scotia
- CBCT-FM-2 in Elmira, Prince Edward Island
- CBLY-FM in Haliburton, Ontario
- CBMC-FM in Thetford-Mines, Quebec
- CFGI-FM in Georgina Island, Ontario
- CFOX-FM-1 in Whistler, British Columbia
- CFRK-FM in Fredericton, New Brunswick
- CHNT-FM in Notre-Dame-du-Nord, Quebec
- CICQ-FM in Mount Pearl, Newfoundland and Labrador
- CIGP-FM in Radisson, Quebec
- CIHA-FM in Champion, Quebec
- CJAG-FM in Jasper, Alberta
- CJET-FM in Smiths Falls, Ontario
- CJOS-FM in Owen Sound, Ontario
- CKOZ-FM in Corner Brook, Newfoundland and Labrador
- CKWO-FM in Couchiching First Nation, Ontario
- VF2076 in Burgeo, Newfoundland and Labrador
- VF2293 in Rainbow Lake, Alberta
- VF2393 in Estevan, Saskatchewan
- VF2578 in Hazleton, British Columbia
- VF8012 in Gatineau, Quebec
- VF8013 in Ottawa, Ontario
- VF8026 in Quesnel, British Columbia

== China ==
- Radio Beijing International in Beijing
- CNR The Voice of China in Chaozhou

== Germany ==
- NDR Info Hamburg

== Indonesia ==
- NBS FM in Sukabumi, West Java

== Israel ==
- Radio Makan in Beersheba, Eilat, Haifa and the Jordan Rift Valley

== Japan ==
- JOPN-FM
- RKK Radio in Hitoyoshi, Kumamoto

== Malaysia ==
- Ai FM in Labuan
- Minnal FM in Kuala Lumpur

== Mexico ==
- XHBIO-FM in Guadalajara, Jalisco
- XHCAQ-FM in Cancún, Quintana Roo
- XHCCCB-FM in Culiacán, Sinaloa
- XHCPCF-FM in Tlapa De Comonfort, Guerrero
- XHLY-FM in Morelia, Michoacán
- XHMMF-FM in Mexicali, Baja California
- XHMTE-FM in Ciudad Mante, Tamaulipas
- XHMTO-FM in Matamoros, Tamaulipas
- XHOI-FM in León, Guanajuato
- XHONC-FM in Tuxtla Gutiérrez, Chiapas
- XHPCDC-FM in Ciudad del Carmen, Campeche
- XHPCMQ-FM in Cadereyta de Montes, Querétaro
- XHPSBZ-FM in Sombrerete, Zacatecas
- XHSCIX-FM in Tepoztlán, Morelos
- XHTRR-FM in Torreón, Coahuila
- XHTU-FM in Tuxpan, Veracruz
- XHUSS-FM in Hermosillo, Sonora
- XHZS-FM in Coatzacoalcos, Veracruz

== Philippines ==
- DWFM in Metro Manila, Philippines
- DYBN in Cebu City
- DXWT in Davao City
- DYYS-FM in Iloilo City
- DWQA in Legazpi City
- DWCK in Laoag City

== Saint Lucia ==
- LIBERTY FM in Soufriere, Saint Lucia

== United States (Channel 222) ==
- KBLU-LP in Logan, Utah
- KBRY in Sargent, Nebraska
- KCCV in Olathe, Kansas
- KDPM in Marshall, Texas
- KEHH in Livingston, Texas
- KEZO in Omaha, Nebraska
- KFII in Hugo, Colorado
- KGON in Portland, Oregon
- KHRB-LP in Harrisburg, Oregon
- KIIZ in Killeen, Texas
- KIJN-FM in Farwell, Texas
- KIPR in Pine Bluff, Arkansas
- KIXM in Victor, Idaho
- KIZN in Boise, Idaho
- KKGQ in Newton, Kansas
- KKMT in Ronan, Montana
- KKXI-LP in Mount Pleasant, Texas
- KMOZ-FM in Grand Junction, Colorado
- KMYY in Rayville, Louisiana
- KMZE in Woodward, Oklahoma
- KNFM in Midland, Texas
- KNNU in Antlers, Oklahoma
- KNRG in New Ulm, Texas
- KOEL-FM in Oelwein, Iowa
- KOFX in El Paso, Texas
- KOMP (FM) in Las Vegas, Nevada
- KQRQ in Rapid City, South Dakota
- KQVT in Victoria, Texas
- KRED in Eureka, California
- KREU in Roland, Oklahoma
- KRJF-LP in Santa Rosa, California
- KRNH in Kerrville, Texas
- KRRL in Los Angeles, California
- KRST in Albuquerque, New Mexico
- KSAR in Thayer, Missouri
- KSDL in Sedalia, Missouri
- KSJO in San Jose, California
- KSSK in Waipahu, Hawaii
- KSTH in Holyoke, Colorado
- KSVL in Smith, Nevada
- KTAR in Glendale, Arizona
- KTTN-FM in Trenton, Missouri
- KVRH in Salida, Colorado
- KWCD in Bisbee, Arizona
- KWHJ-LP in Newport, Washington
- KWRZ in Canyonville, Oregon
- KWTB in Alakanuk, Alaska
- KXQX in Tusayan, Arizona
- KXRA in Alexandria, Minnesota
- KYOY in Kimball, Nebraska
- KYUS in Miles City, Montana
- KZUS in Ephrata, Washington
- WAEG in Evans, Georgia
- WBNZ in Beulah, Michigan
- WCMQ in Hialeah, Florida
- WCOL in Columbus, Ohio
- WDEF in Chattanooga, Tennessee
- WENQ in Grenada, Mississippi
- WERQ in Baltimore, Maryland
- WESI-LP in Sugarhill, Georgia
- WFLY in Troy, New York
- WFWI in Fort Wayne, Indiana
- WGXL in Hanover, New Hampshire
- WHHG in Milan, Tennessee
- WHKQ in Louisa, Kentucky
- WHNA in Riverside, Pennsylvania
- WIL in Saint Louis, Missouri
- WINS-FM in New York, New York
- WJMQ in Clintonville, Wisconsin
- WJPD in Ishpeming, Michigan
- WJWY-LP in Wauchula, Florida
- WKRK in Cleveland Heights, Ohio
- WKRR in Asheboro, North Carolina
- WKTQ (FM) in Oakland, Maryland
- WLWI in Montgomery, Alabama
- WLZN in Macon, Georgia
- WMME in Augusta, Maine
- WMOQ in Bostwick, Georgia
- WMXD in Detroit, Michigan
- WOGA in Mansfield, Pennsylvania
- WOSQ in Spencer, Wisconsin
- WPRO in Providence, Rhode Island
- WPWX in Hammond, Indiana
- WQLI in Meigs, Georgia
- WQSL in Jacksonville, North Carolina
- WRLS-FM in Hayward, Wisconsin
- WRRN in Warren, Pennsylvania
- WRVU-LP in Grand Rapids, Michigan
- WRWW-LP in Lowell, Michigan
- WSGA (FM) in Hinesville, Georgia
- WSSJ-LP in White Springs, Florida
- WTTS in Trafalgar, Indiana
- WTYD in Deltaville, Virginia
- WWKA in Orlando, Florida
- WXCR in New Martinsville, West Virginia
- WXLK in Roanoke, Virginia
- WXRK-LP in Charlottesville, Virginia
- WYGE in London, Kentucky
- WYRC-LP in Spencer, West Virginia
- WZPR in Nags Head, North Carolina
- WZPW in Peoria, Illinois
- WZRH in Laplace, Louisiana
