= KDAB =

KDAB may refer to:

- Daytona Beach International Airport (ICAO code KDAB)
- KKHG, a defunct radio station (92.3 FM) formerly licensed to serve Hugo, Colorado, United States, which held the call sign KDAB from 2013 to 2015
- A Swedish Qt consulting company, and second-largest Qt contributor.
