= U.S. Route 40 =

Highway in the United States

U.S. Route 40
- US 40 highlighted in red; the gaps represent the unsigned portions

Route information
- Length: 2,285.74 mi (3,678.54 km)
- Existed: November 11, 1926–present

Major junctions
- West end: I-80 / US 189 in Silver Summit, UT
- I-25 in Denver, CO; I-35 in Kansas City, MO; I-44 / I-55 in St. Louis, MO; I-55 / I-64 / I-70 in East St. Louis, IL; I-65 / I-69 / I-70 / I-74 in Indianapolis, IN; I-75 in Vandalia, OH; I-77 in Cambridge, OH; I-79 in Washington, PA; I-81 in Hagerstown, MD; I-95 in Baltimore, MD
- East end: US 322 in Atlantic City, NJ

Location
- Country: United States
- States: Utah, Colorado, Kansas, Missouri, Illinois, Indiana, Ohio, West Virginia, Pennsylvania, Maryland, Delaware, New Jersey

Highway system
- United States Numbered Highway System; List; Special; Divided
← US 36	→ US 41

U.S. Route 40 or U.S. Highway 40 (US 40), also known as the Main Street of America (a nickname shared with U.S. Route 66), is a major east–west United States Highway traveling across the United States from the Mountain states to the Mid-Atlantic. As with most routes whose numbers end in a zero, US 40 once traversed the entire country. It is one of the first U.S. Highways created in 1926, and its original termini were in San Francisco, California, and Atlantic City, New Jersey. US 40 ends at a junction with Interstate 80 (I-80) in Silver Summit, Utah, just outside Salt Lake City. West of this point US 40 was functionally replaced with I-80, and as these segments of I-80 were constructed the western portion of US 40 was truncated several times.

Starting at its western terminus in Utah, US 40 crosses a total of 12 states, including Colorado, Kansas, Missouri, Illinois, Indiana, Ohio, West Virginia, Pennsylvania, Maryland, Delaware, and New Jersey. US 40 passes through or by major cities including Denver, Kansas City, St. Louis, Indianapolis, Columbus, Baltimore, and Wilmington. Three former and four current state capitals lie along the route. (Note: The current capitals are Denver, Topeka, Indianapolis, and Columbus. Vandalia was a former capital of Illinois, Zanesville was a former capital of Ohio, and Wheeling was a former capital of West Virginia. Prior to truncation the route served Sacramento, Salt Lake City and the former capital of California, Vallejo.) For much of its route, US 40 runs parallel to, or concurrently with, several major Interstate Highways: I-70 from Denver, Colorado, to Washington, Pennsylvania; and again from Hancock, Maryland to Baltimore; I-64 in parts of Missouri and Illinois; I-68 along western Maryland; and I-95 from Baltimore to New Castle, Delaware.

The route was built on top of several older highways, most notably the National Road and the Victory Highway. The National Road was created in 1806 by an act of Congress to serve as the first federally funded highway construction project. When completed it connected Cumberland, Maryland, with Vandalia, Illinois. The Victory Highway was designated as a memorial to World War I veterans and ran from Kansas City, Missouri to San Francisco. Other important roads that have become part of US 40 include Zane's Trace in Ohio, Braddock Road in Maryland and Pennsylvania, part of the Black Horse Pike in New Jersey, part of the Oregon Trail in Kansas, and the Lincoln Highway throughout most of California.

== Route description ==
Lengths
	mi	km
UT	174.54	280.89
CO	496.44	798.94
KS	423.67	681.83
MO	255.05	410.46
IL	159.99	257.48
IN	143.95	231.67
OH	228.37	367.53
WV	15.87	25.54
PA	82.46	132.71
MD	220.88	355.47
DE	17.18	27.65
NJ	64.28	103.45

=== Utah ===
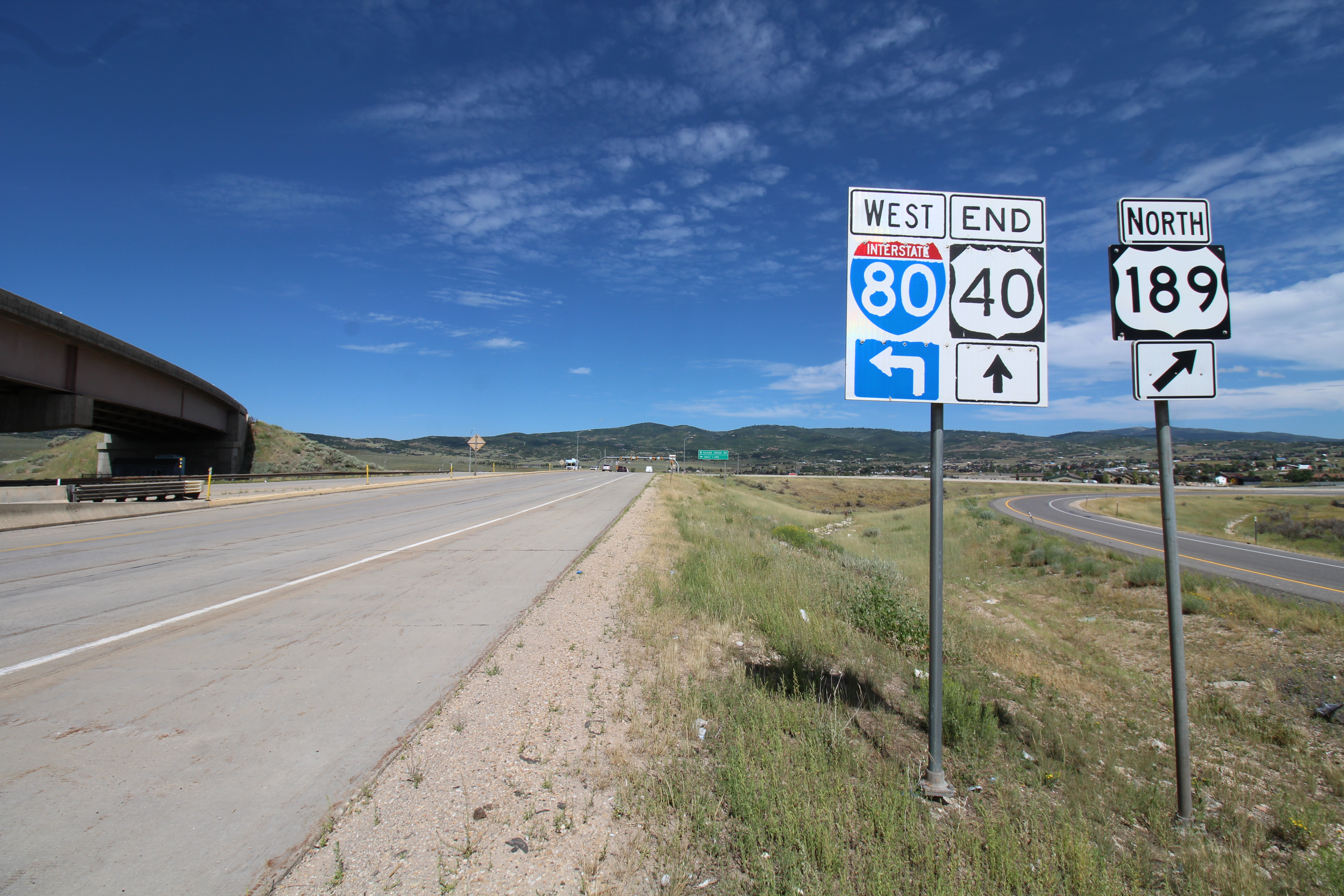
The western terminus of US 40 at I-80 in Silver Creek Junction

The western terminus of US 40 is in Silver Summit, Utah, at an interchange with I-80, several miles north of Park City, at Silver Creek Junction. The road runs concurrently with US 189 until it has reached Heber City. US 40 is a limited access highway from the I-80 junction to its intersection with State Route 32 (SR 32), approximately 13 miles (21 km) south of Park City. From there, the road takes a generally southerly course to Heber City. In Heber City, there is an intersection with SR 113. One mile later, US 189 splits off. There are no more major intersections until US 40 has reached Fruitland, as it meets SR 208. About 18 miles later, the road enters Duchesne. In Duchesne, it meets US 191 and SR 87. US 40 passes Duchesne and starts a concurrency. The concurrency continues into Roosevelt, Fort Duchesne and Vernal. In Roosevelt, it meets SR 87 again in a five-point intersection. There are two intersections with SR 121, in Roosevelt and Vernal. In Fort Duchesne, there is an intersection with SR 88. After US 40 passes Vernal, US 191 splits off and the concurrency ends. After that, there are no more major intersections until US 40 reaches Naples, as it meets SR 45. About nine miles (14 km) later, US 40 enters Jensen. In Jensen, there is an intersection with SR 149. About 18 miles (29 km) later, the road enters Colorado.

=== Colorado ===
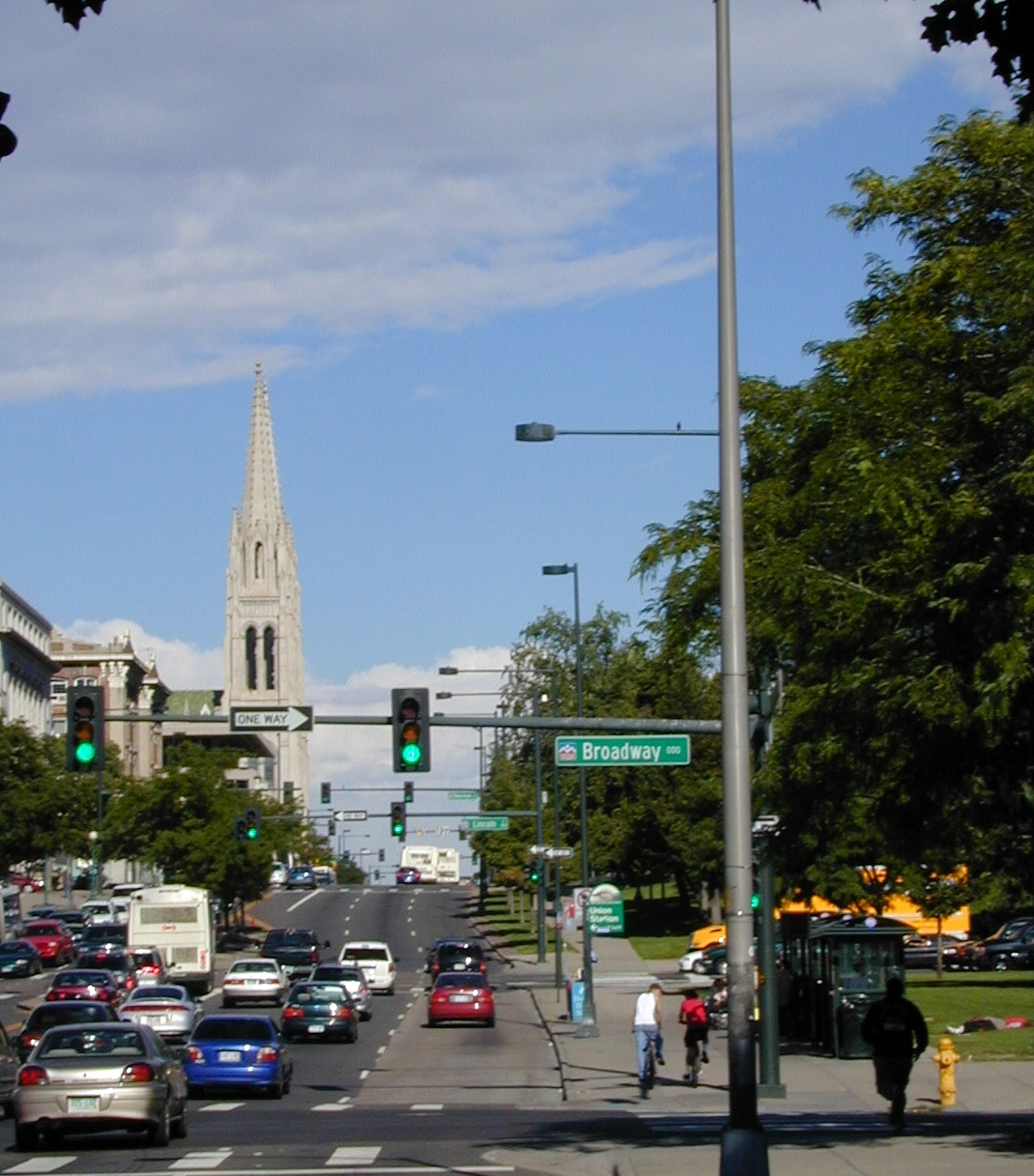
Colfax Avenue carries US 40 through Denver

US 40 enters Colorado, two miles (3.2 km) west of Dinosaur. In Dinosaur, there is an intersection with State Highway 64 (SH 64). After passing Dinosaur, there are no more major intersections until US 40 reaches Maybell, as it meets with SH 318. Some 30 miles (48 km) later, the road enters Craig. In Craig, US 40 starts a very short concurrency with SH 13. After Craig, SH 13 splits off. The road then passes through Hayden without major intersections. Then it exits Hayden and enters Steamboat Springs. There is an intersection with SH 131 and SH 14. US 40 then continues southeast into Kremmling. In Kremmling, there is an intersection with SH 134 and SH 9. It then exits Kremmling and enters Granby. There is an intersection with US 34. The road then passes Fraser and Winter Park without major intersections. About 26 miles (42 km) later, US 40 starts a concurrency with I-70. About 15 miles (24 km) later, I-70 splits off. Four miles (6.4 km)s later, it is concurrent again. Three miles (4.8 km) later, I-70 splits off again. After the second concurrency with I-70, US 40 enters Denver.

The road passes through downtown Denver on Colfax Avenue, and has intersections with SH 391, SH 121, SH 95, and SH 2 and an interchange with US 287. The route through Denver also serves as the business loop for I-70. East of Denver, US 40 passes through Aurora and becomes concurrent with I-70 once again. Seventy miles (110 km) later, it enters Limon. In Limon, I-70 splits off; however, the road is still concurrent with US 287. There is an intersection with SH 71. US 40 then passes Hugo without major intersections. In Wild Horse, it meets SH 94. About 20 miles (32 km) later, the road enters Kit Carson. There is an intersection with SH 59. After Kit Carson, US 287 splits off and the concurrency ends. After that, there are no more major intersections until US 40 reaches Cheyenne Wells, as it meets US 385 in an interchange. The road then passes Arapahoe without major intersections. Seven miles (11 km) later, US 40 enters Kansas.

=== Kansas ===
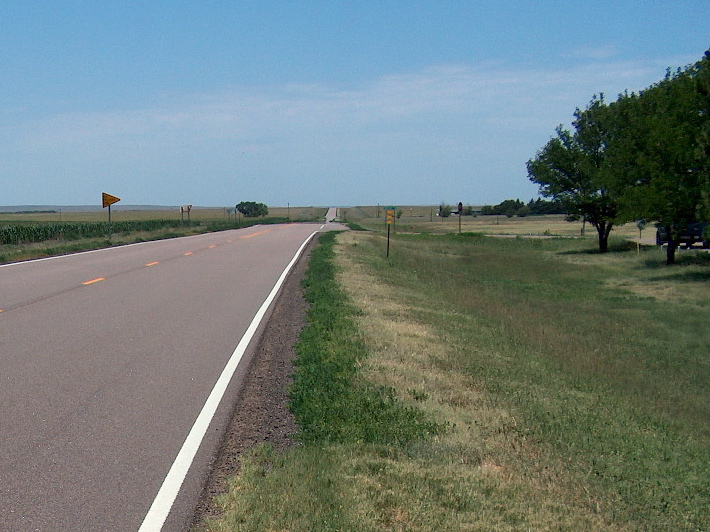
US 40 crossing the Great Plains in Kansas

US 40 enters Kansas near the unincorporated community of Weskan. The first sizable town it enters is Sharon Springs, where it intersects K-27. From there it goes northeast to Oakley and follows Eagle Eye Road before merging with I-70 east of town. The two routes remain merged until Topeka, although the prior alignment of US 40, named Old Highway 40, parallels I-70 for most of the way. From Ellsworth to Salina, the old alignment of US 40 is signed as K-140.

In Topeka, US 40 leaves I-70 at exit 366, follows the Oakland Expressway concurrently with K-4 north to 6th Avenue, then heads east along 6th Avenue out of town. Through Topeka, US 40 closely follows the route of the Oregon Trail. At the Shawnee-Douglas county line near Big Springs, US 40 crosses to the south of I-70 and enters Lawrence from the west along West 6th Street. At the west side of Lawrence, the route is joined by K-10 and travels south and east to the junction with US 59 and then runs north with US 59 to cross the Kansas River. It follows North 2nd and North 3rd Streets, crosses back under I-70, leaves US 59, and merges with US 24 before leaving town.

US 40 remains merged with US 24 as the two routes travel northeast to the town of Tonganoxie. From there, the merged routes turn due east toward Kansas City, Kansas. In Kansas City, US 40 and US 24 intersect US 73 and K-7, and turn south toward I-70. US 40, along with US 24, then merge onto I-70 and recross the Kansas River over the Lewis and Clark Viaduct just before entering Kansas City, Missouri.

On December 1, 2008, US 40, along with US 24 and US 73, was rerouted south along K-7 west of Kansas City to the intersection with I-70. Before this date, US 40 and US 24 continued along State Avenue to College Parkway before turning right to follow Turner Diagonal for 1/2 mile (800 m) where US 40 joined Interstate 70 for the duration of its journey eastward toward Missouri.

In 1951, the State of Kansas designated US 40 as a Blue Star Memorial Highway from border to border.

=== Missouri ===
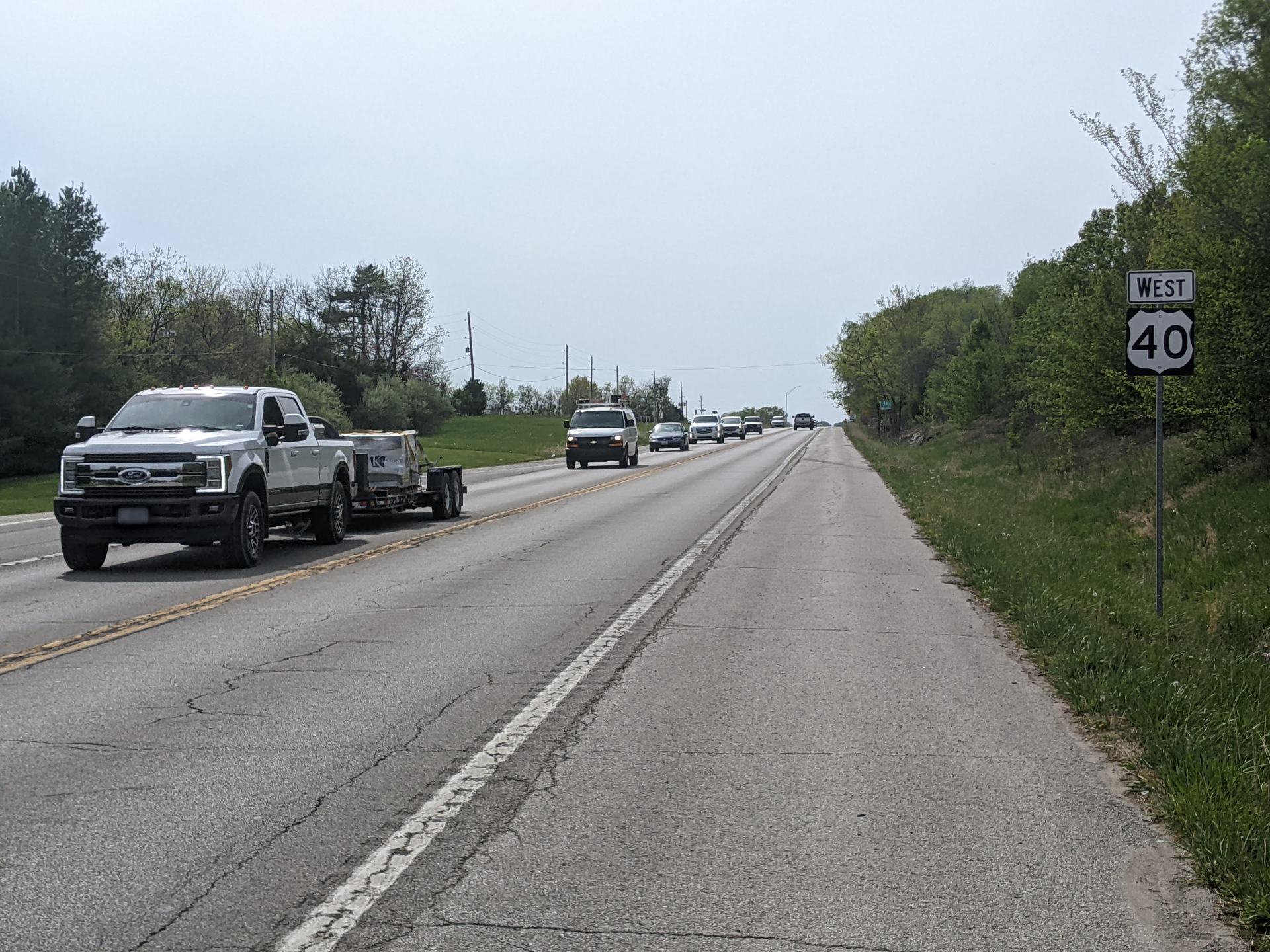
US 40 West in Blue Springs, Missouri

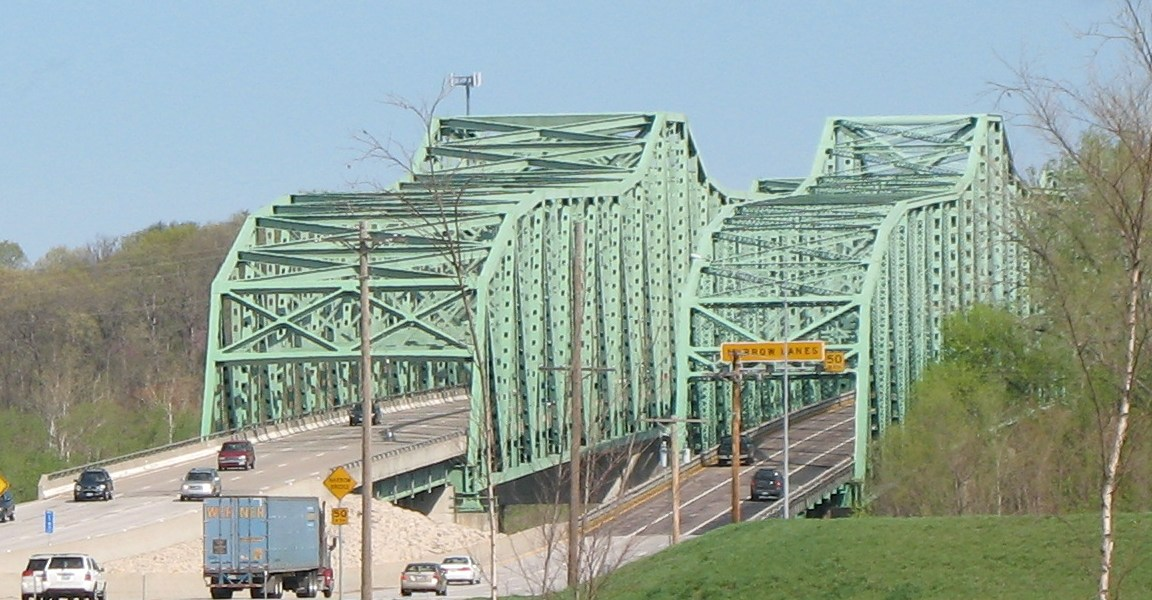
The Daniel Boone Bridge across the Missouri River. The older structure on the right was demolished and replaced by a new bridge in 2015.

US 40 enters Missouri in Kansas City along a concurrency with I-70. It leaves I-70 at exit 7A. US 40 parallels I-70 to the north through Kansas City until exit 11, where it crosses and parallels it to the south through the suburbs of Independence, Lee's Summit, Blue Springs, and Grain Valley before it rejoins I-70 at exit 24. An older alignment carries the designation "Old US 40".

US 40 stays with I-70 until it reaches Boonville, where it leaves at exit 101, along with Business Loop 70. Both designations follow Ashley Road, before US 40 leaves and heads north along Main Street. After crossing the Missouri River in Boonville, US 40 turns east before rejoining I-70 again at exit 121 on the outskirts of Columbia. At milemarker 124, the US 40 alignment runs north of I-70 for one mile (designated I-70 Drive NW), then crosses under I-70, and continues east south of I-70 to milemarker 128 (designated Business Loop 70), where it entered back on to I-70 eastbound until 2018. This entrance was abandoned when Business Loop 70 was extended by the City of Columbia east, across Hinkson Creek, then south as an outer road to US 63, connecting with Conley Road. The two routes remain concurrent until exit 210A in Wentzville.

From Wentzville, US 40 now joins a concurrency with I-64 and US 61 and heads southeast, crossing the Missouri River again over the Daniel Boone Bridge in St. Charles. US 40 stays joined with I-64 and leaves the state in St. Louis on the Poplar Street Bridge across the Mississippi River, along with I-64 and I-55. In the St. Louis metro area, the highway is often called "Highway Forty" since it predates the I-64 designation.

Until 1926, US 40 in Missouri was Route 2.

On January 2, 2008, five miles (8.0 km) of the route in St. Louis was closed both eastbound and westbound from I-170 to I-270. It re-opened December 15, 2008, two weeks ahead of the originally scheduled date of December 31, 2008. On December 13, 2008, another five-mile (8.0 km) section of the freeway closed both ways from I-170 to the Kingshighway exit in the city. It was re-opened on December 7, 2009, with the speed limit raised to 60 mph on most of the stretch. It is a full freeway all the way from Downtown St. Louis to Wentzville. When complete, the entire new freeway was signed as I-64.

=== Illinois ===
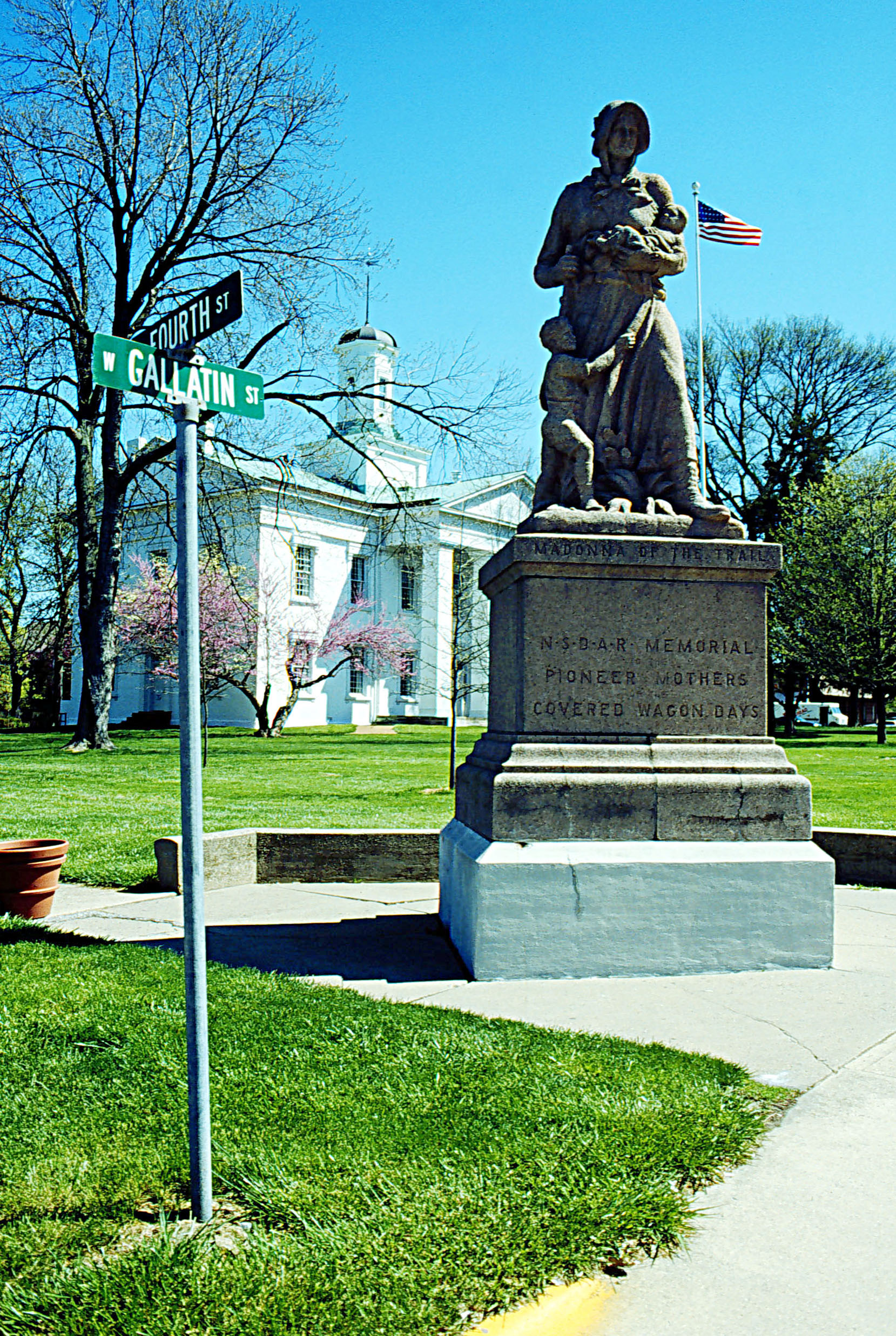
The Old State House in Vandalia, and its Madonna of the Trail sculpture, marks the western terminus of the National Road, a precursor to US 40.

The next 159.99 miles (257.48 km) of US 40 lie within the state of Illinois. Except where the route has been re-aligned with I-70, it is an entirely undivided surface route. Formerly a major highway, it has lost most of its non-local traffic to I-70. Some early bypasses of towns were built with the apparent intention of twinning them as a divided highway with access limited to intersections. I-70 uses none of those old bypasses that remain as sections of US 40. The westernmost portion of the historic National Road lies on most of the US 40 alignment in Illinois.

US 40 crosses into Illinois at East St. Louis on the Poplar Street Bridge concurrently with I-55/I-64. The route has a close relationship with I-70 for the remainder of the time it spends in the state, being directly concurrent with or paralleling it throughout Illinois.

Between Pocahontas and Mulberry Grove, US 40 passes through several small towns. In Vandalia, Illinois, the former state capitol, it follows Veterans Avenue and Kennedy Boulevard (with US 51) through town. The Old State House in Vandalia marks the western terminus of the National Road, one of the earliest roads upon which US 40 was designated. From Vandalia, the road continues to the northeast passing through the early German settlement town of Teutopolis and several city streets in Effingham. Beyond Effingham, US 40 passes through many small unincorporated towns before leaving the state near Marshall.

=== Indiana ===
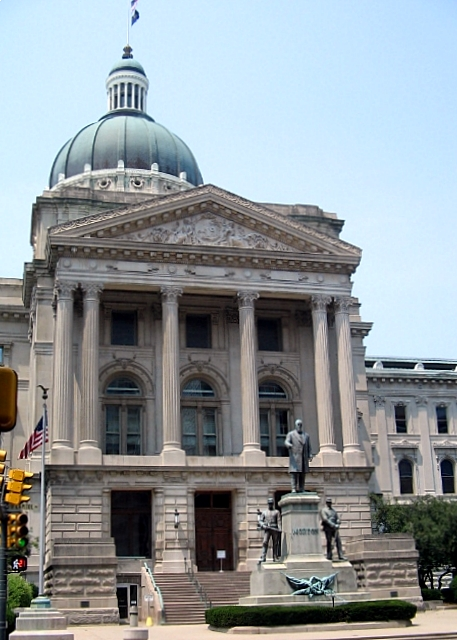
The Indiana Statehouse along the former US 40 alignment (Washington Street) in downtown Indianapolis

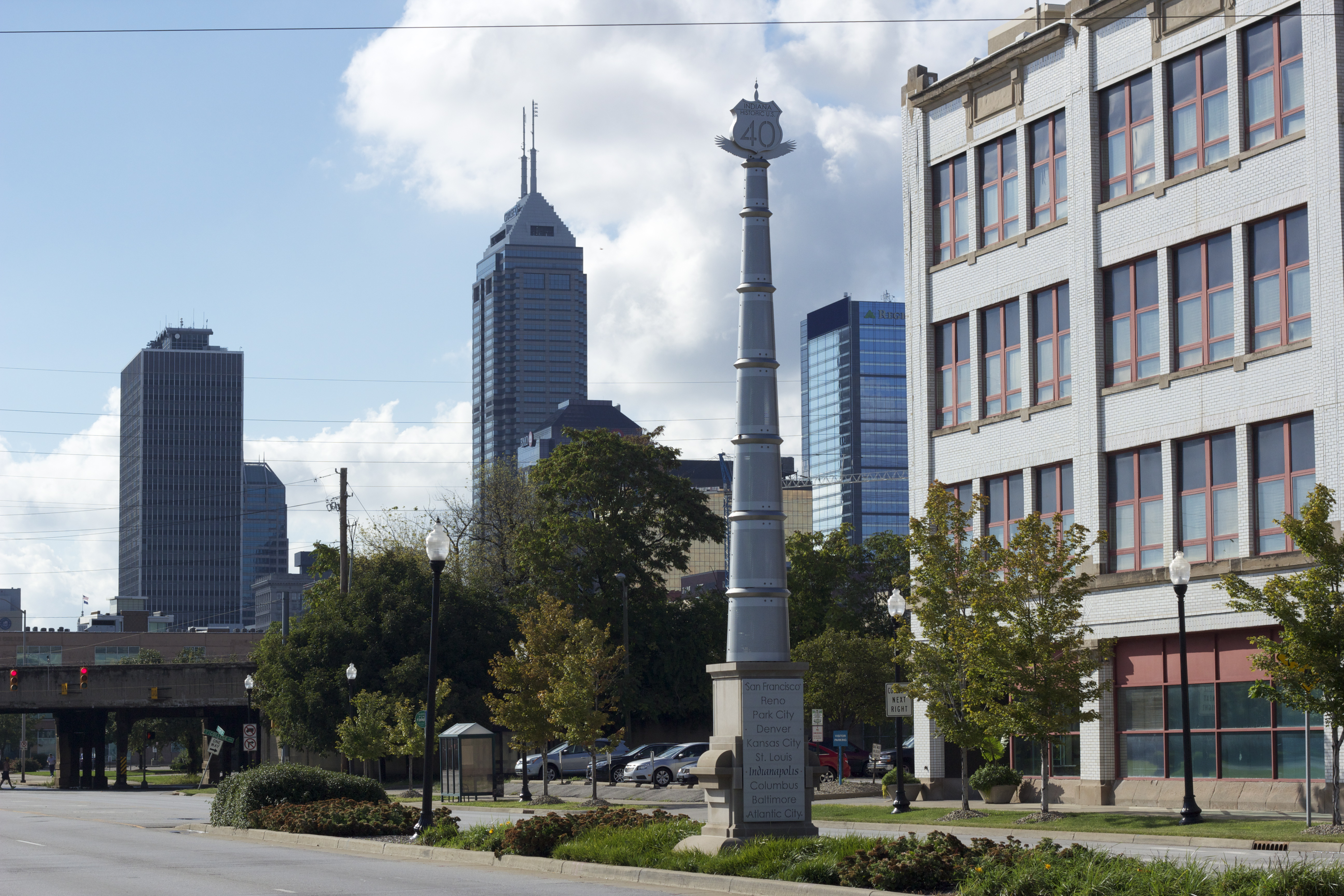
US 40 monument along Washington Street, highlighting the major cities along the original highway

US 40 enters Indiana from the west at unincorporated Liggett along with I-70. US 40 leaves the Interstate at exit 11 and heads north through the east side of Terre Haute with State Road 46 (SR 46). The road leaves the city to the northeast upon reaching Wabash Avenue.

Upon leaving Terre Haute, US 40 passes through the small towns of Seelyville, Brazil, Knightsville and Harmony. Between Seelyville and Brazil, the road bypasses several small unincorporated communities which are served by SR 340, a former alignment of US 40. The road continues to the northeast beyond Harmony, passing many unincorporated places such as Reelsville, Pleasant Gardens, Manhattan, Putnamville, Mount Meridian, Stilesville and Belleville along the way to Plainfield, a suburb of Indianapolis.

In Plainfield, US 40 is Main Street and passes The Shops at Perry Crossing and a nostalgic stainless steel diner. Upon leaving Plainfield, US 40 becomes Washington Street, where it passes by the northern edge of Indianapolis International Airport. After passing the airport, US 40 is routed onto I-465 southbound on the west side of Indianapolis. A sign along the entrance ramp advises motorists "For US 40 East, Follow I-465 South to Exit 46". This route bypasses downtown Indianapolis and instead goes through the southern part of Indianapolis; its nearest point is about five miles (8.0 km) south of the city center. Along the eastern edge of Indianapolis, US 40 leaves I-465 at exit 46 and is once again routed onto Washington Street.

East of Indianapolis, US 40 enters Cumberland where it takes the name National Road. Paralleling I-70 at a distance of about 3.5 miles (5.6 km), US 40 continues eastward across Indiana, passing through such communities as Greenfield, Knightstown, Lewisville, Straughn, Dublin, Mount Auburn, and Cambridge City, where it is known by various local names including Washington Street, Main Street, and National Road.

Note: Just east of Knightstown, cross the Big Blue River, on the right is part of the old National Road. This section is about 4.3 miles (6.9 km) long and rejoins US 40 in Dunreith.

US 40's last stop in Indiana is the city of Richmond. In Richmond, it passes a statue known as Madonna of the Trail, one of a series of twelve statues across the country that memorialize women pioneers who made the trek to settle the western U.S. In 1968, a section of US 40 (Main Street) in Richmond was destroyed by a massive gas explosion. This caused a section of Main Street to be closed to automobile traffic, and US 40 was rerouted along North A Street (westbound) and South A Street (eastbound). Near the Indiana–Ohio state line, US 40 crosses I-70 at exit 156B before entering Ohio.

=== Ohio ===
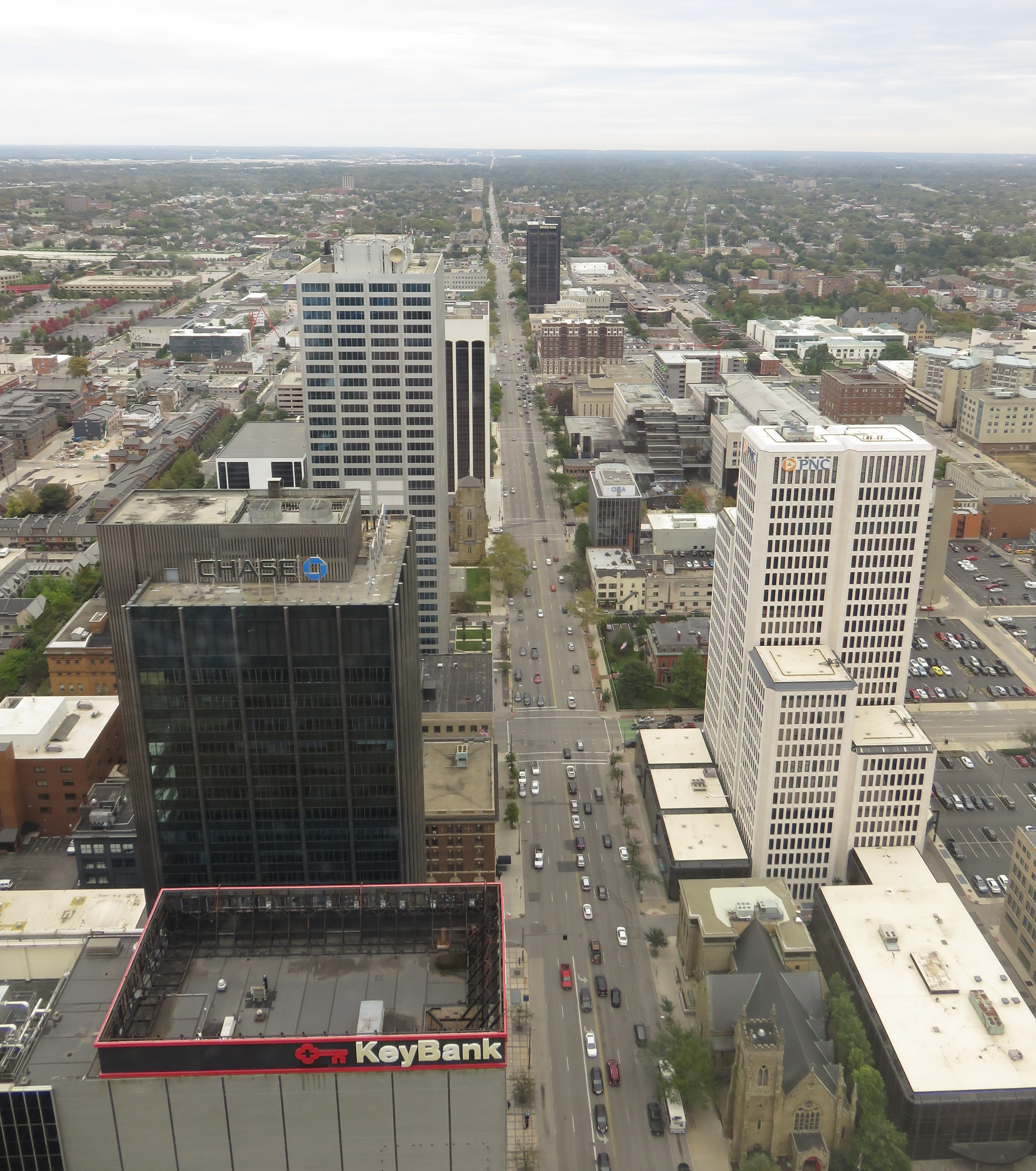
US 40 viewed from the Rhodes State Office Tower in Columbus, Ohio

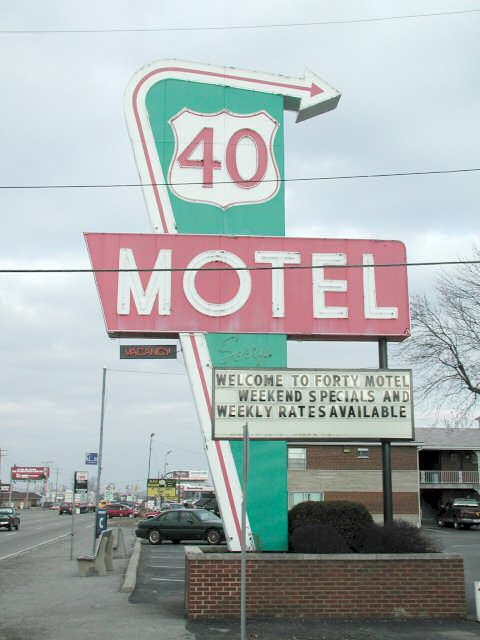
The Forty Motel in Columbus

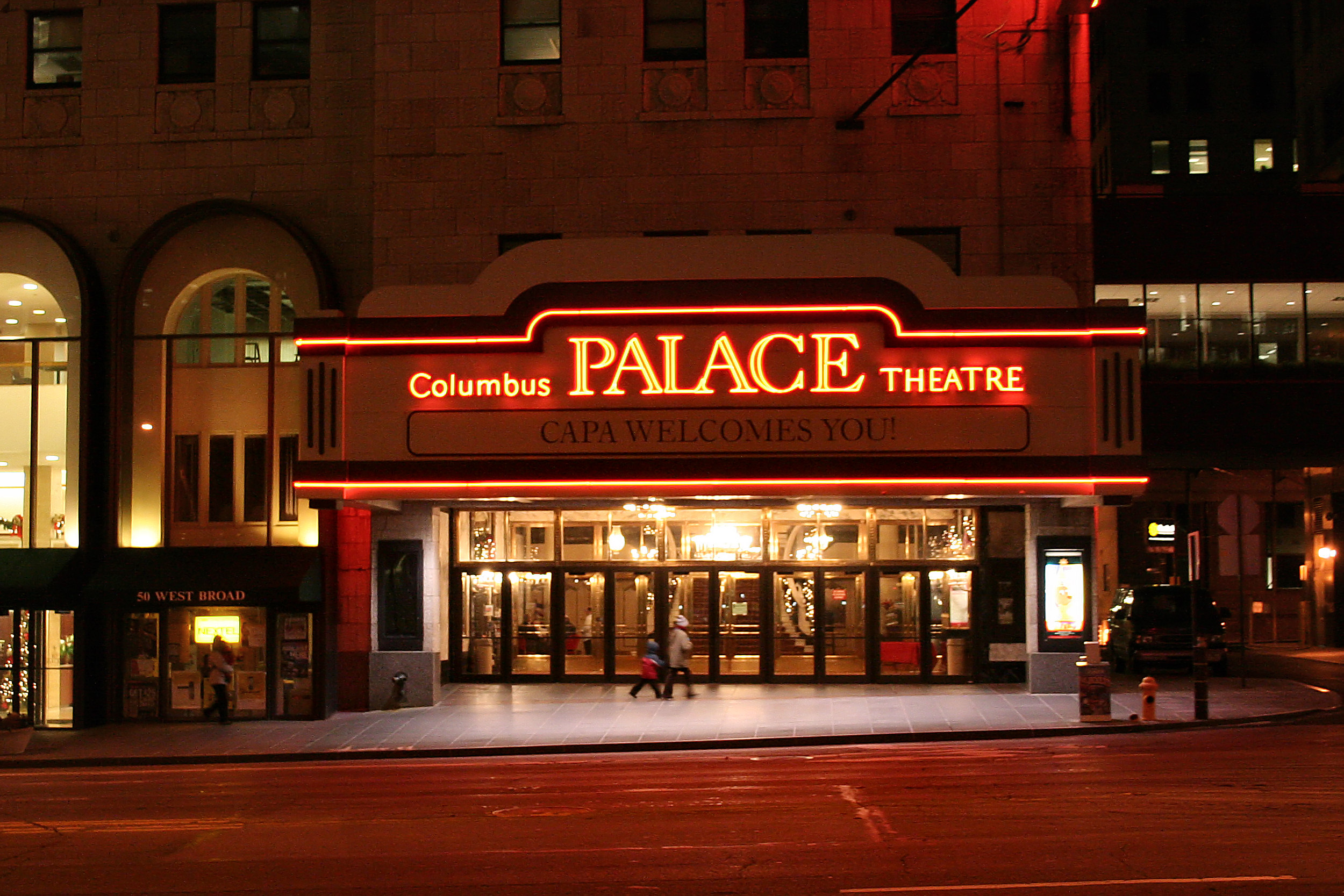
The landmark Palace Theatre on US 40 in Columbus

US 40 enters Ohio just to the south of New Paris. The road is always close to the newer I-70 eastward toward Dayton. In Vandalia, the road passes to the south of Dayton International Airport and crosses the Dixie Highway and I-75 and the Great Miami River. The road never actually enters Dayton, instead skirting the northern suburbs on the way toward Springfield.

The portion of US 40 between Medway-Carlisle Road (SR 517/County Road 303) and Lammes Lane in Bethel Township, Clark County, is designated "Staff Sergeant Wesley Williams Memorial Highway", in honor of a 2005 Tecumseh High School graduate who died on December 10, 2012, while serving in the U.S. Army, from injuries suffered when enemy forces attacked his unit with an improvised explosive device in Kandahar Province, Afghanistan.

In Springfield, US 40 is split between two one-way streets. North Street carries US 40 westbound and Columbia Street carries US 40 eastbound. The route then shifts on to East Main Street before leaving town to the east, once again as National Road. From Tuttle Road just east of Springfield to SR 54 in South Vienna, US 40 has been designated as the Deputy Matthew Yates Memorial Highway. Yates was killed inside a trailer on July 24, 2022, at Harmony Estates MHP as he responded to a report of a shooting. I-70 crosses again at unincorporated Harmony. US 40 passes just north of London where it intersects SR 56 and US 42 before heading into West Jefferson. In West Jefferson, US 40 is routed on Main Street.

In the Columbus metropolitan area, US 40 enters from the west as Broad Street. Among the sites along US 40 in Columbus are the Ohio Statehouse, the Columbus Museum of Art, and LeVeque Tower, the oldest skyscraper in Columbus. In Bexley, the route follows Main Street, using Drexel Avenue to get between Broad and Main. US 40 continues as Main Street through Reynoldsburg before leaving the Columbus area as National Road yet again.

East of the Columbus metro area, US 40 parallels I-70 at a distance of about one mile (1.6 km), passing through several small towns, including Kirkersville, and Hebron. In Zanesville, the road becomes Main Street, and at the center of town US 40 begins a concurrency with US 22 that carries it to Cambridge. US 40 crosses the Muskingum River in Zanesville on the famous Y-Bridge. US 22/US 40 enters Cambridge from the southwest along John Glenn Highway, and splits in town; US 40 follows Wheeling Avenue. In Old Washington, US 40 joins I-70 at exit 186. It leaves I-70 at exit 201 near Morristown. The two roads cross paths several times before they both leave Ohio on a pair of bridges across the Ohio River at Bridgeport.

The now-decommissioned SR 440 ran along old US 40 in places where US 40 had been shifted onto I-70.

=== West Virginia ===
US 40 is only 16 miles (26 km) long as it passes through West Virginia, mainly through Wheeling, where it briefly runs concurrently with both I-70 and US 250. It diverges from I-70 east of the Fort Henry Bridge and into the northern section on the downtown Wheeling area, where it meets with the Wheeling Suspension Bridge, which was the former link for the National Road.

It then turns twice left and passes over I-70 and Wheeling Hill, past McColloch's Leap, and into the Wheeling suburbs. It intersects WV Route 88 halfway through this leg of US 40, and the southbound leg of WV 88 runs concurrently with US 40 at this point until it reaches Elm Grove, where US 40 turns left and heads into Tridelphia and Valley Grove before reaching the Pennsylvania state line.

=== Pennsylvania ===
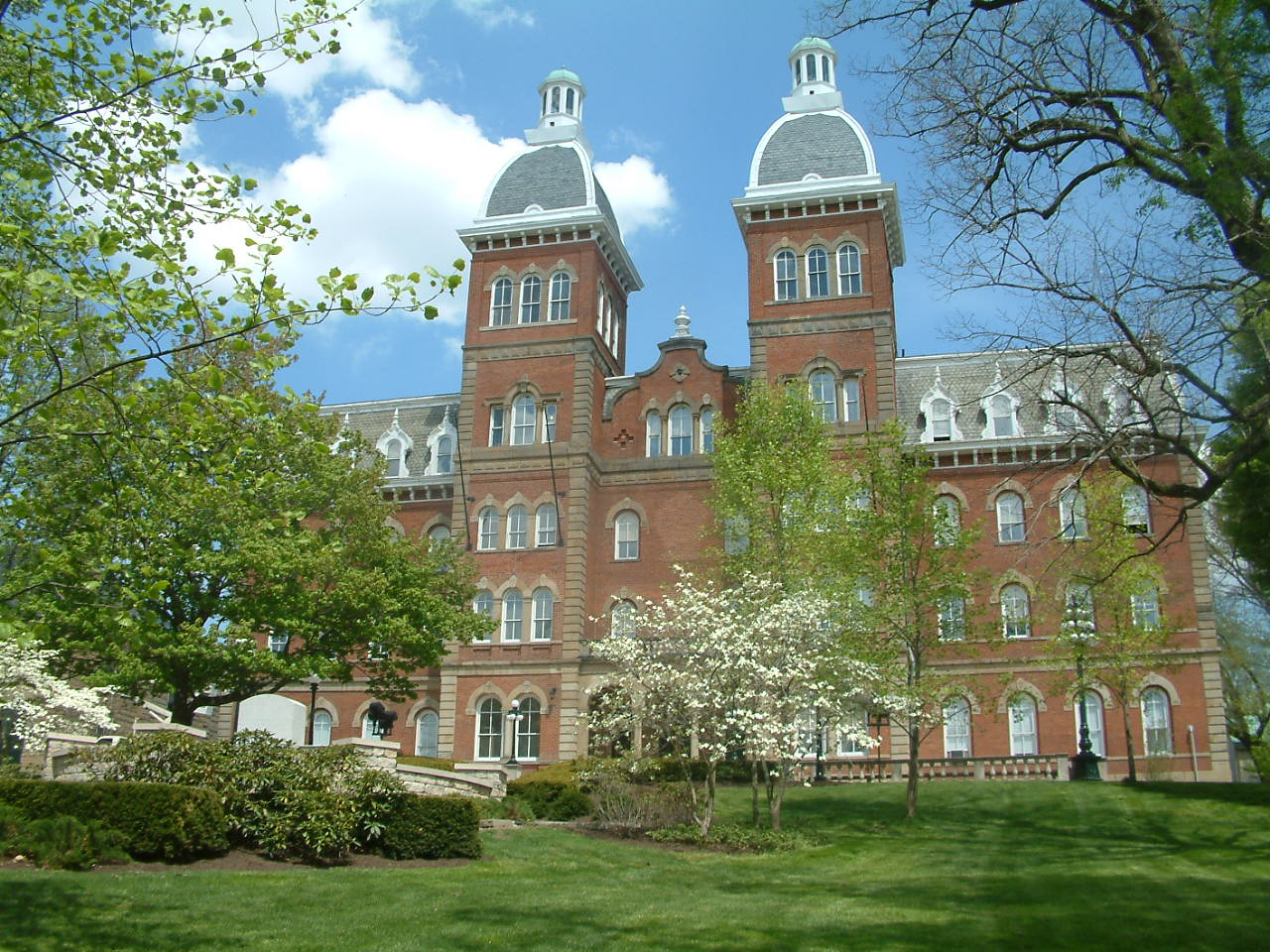
US 40 passes Washington & Jefferson College in the city of Washington, Pennsylvania

US 40 enters Pennsylvania at West Alexander. It closely parallels I-70 from West Virginia until it reaches Washington where it follows Chestnut Street, Jefferson Avenue and Maiden Street. In Washington, US 40 passes to the south of Washington & Jefferson College. Following Maiden Street out of town, the road turns southeast toward the town of California. A short limited-access highway in California and West Brownsville provides an approach to the Lane Bane Bridge across the Monongahela River. From here, the road continues southeast to Uniontown.

US 40 bypasses Uniontown along a limited access highway that also carries US 119. An old alignment through Uniontown is signed as "Business US 40". Southeast of Uniontown, travellers pass the Fort Necessity National Battlefield. It follows Braddock Road southeast of Uniontown, crossing the Youghiogheny River Lake on a bridge completed in 2006. US 40 leaves Pennsylvania near Addison

=== Maryland ===
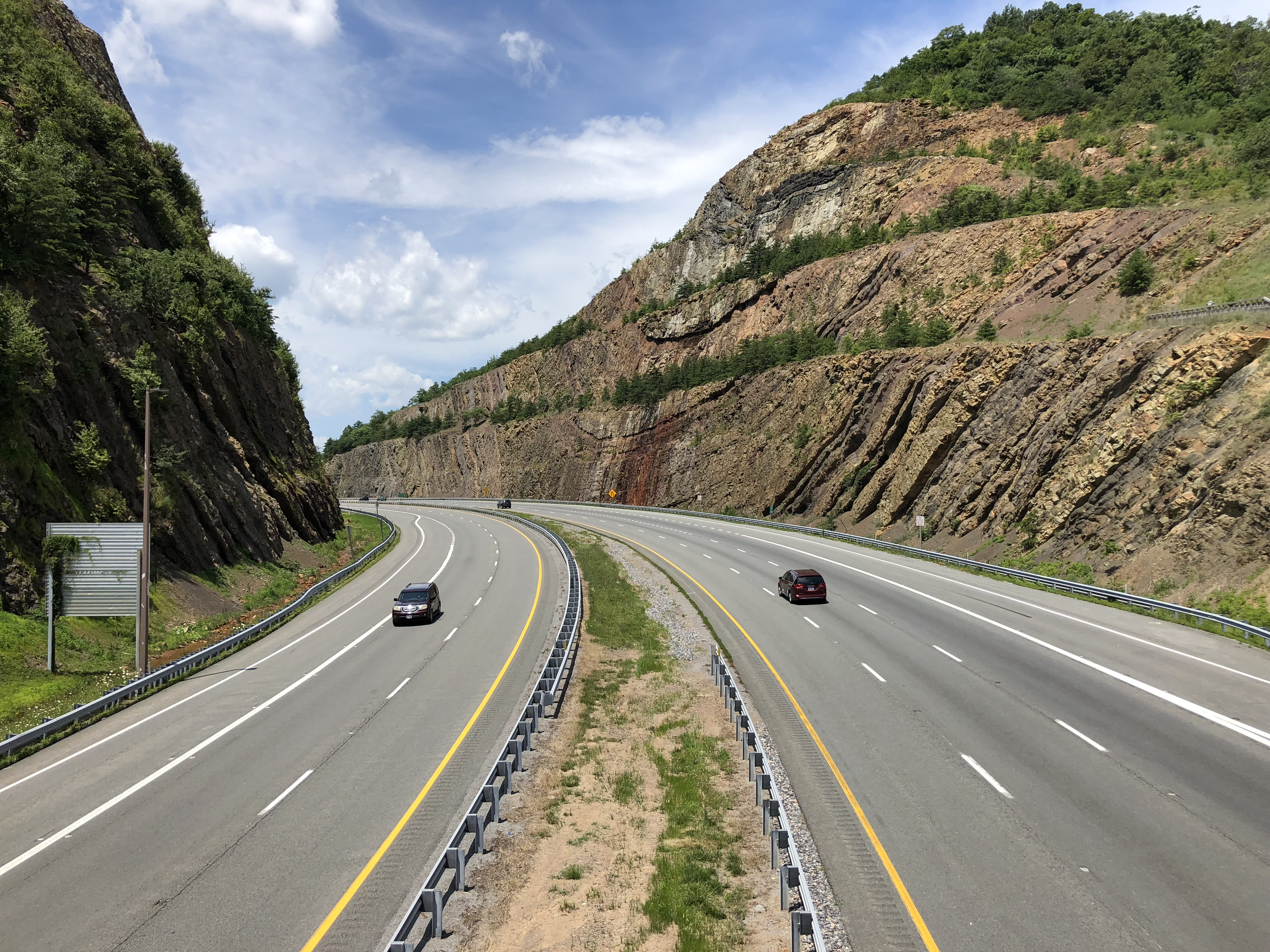
A cut 340 feet (100 m) deep eases the crossing of Sideling Hill on I-68/US 40 west of Hancock

US 40 enters Maryland from Pennsylvania near Grantsville in the western part of the state. Here, and through most of the state, it is known as National Pike. US 40 leaves National Pike shortly after entering Maryland from the northwest and merges with I-68 and US 219 at exit 14B. The old alignment of US 40, still known as National Pike, is signed through much of the western part of the state as either Scenic US 40 or Alternate US 40. US 219 leaves the three-way concurrency at exit 22, but US 40 and I-68 remain on the same pavement through Frostburg and Cumberland.

East of Cumberland, the old National Pike (formerly US 40) carries the MD 144 designation. The I-68/US 40 roadway passes through a 340-foot-deep (100 m) cut in Sideling Hill. Just to the east of the cut is the Sideling Hill Exhibit Center, a museum that highlights Western Maryland geology. At Hancock, where the state of Maryland narrows to less than two miles (3.2 km) wide, I-68 ends, and US 40 merges onto I-70 at exit 1. The two routes closely follow the course of the Chesapeake and Ohio Canal and the Potomac River for several miles before US 40 leaves I-70 at exit 9. US 40 passes directly through the center of Hagerstown using Washington Avenue (eastbound) and Franklin Street (westbound). Here, it intersects I-81 and has an intersection with US 11. Heading southeast out of Hagerstown, US 40 diverges into two separate routes, US 40 and Alt. US 40. US 40 parallels I-70, its longtime travel partner, crossing it at exit 32 near Greenbrier State Park on the Baltimore National Pike alignment. Alt. US 40 heads southeast on the Old National Pike alignment through Boonsboro, crossing South Mountain at Turner's Gap. The two routes converge just west of Frederick.

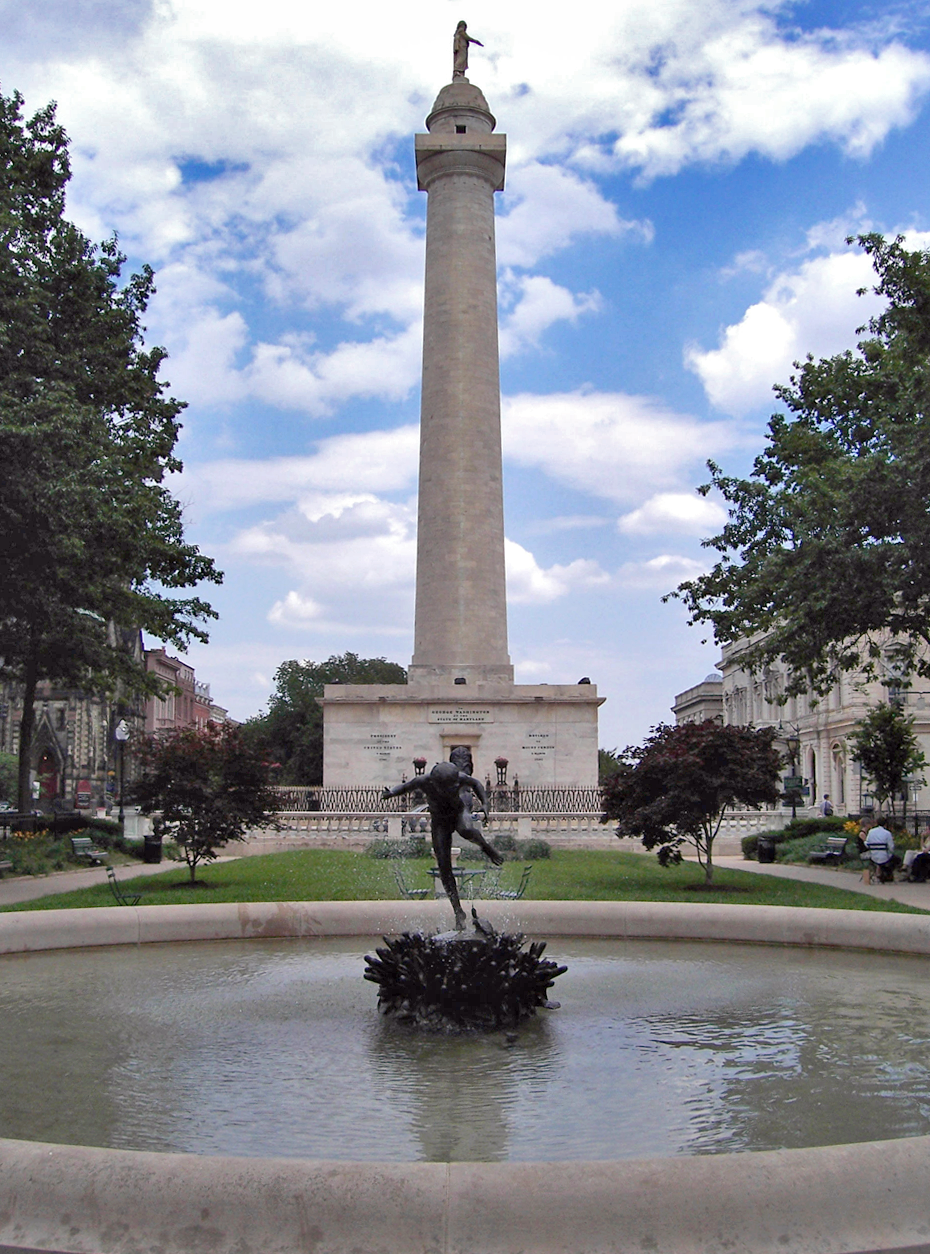
Baltimore's Washington Monument two blocks north of US 40 in Baltimore

In Frederick, US 40 uses Patrick Street before merging onto the US 15 expressway for a short distance. It leaves US 15 and rejoins I-70 on the outskirts of Frederick. MD 144 once again takes over the old alignment of US 40.

US 40 leaves I-70 for the final time upon entering the western suburbs of Baltimore, once again as Baltimore National Pike. The route passes through Patapsco Valley State Park north of Ellicott City and enters the Baltimore city limits along Edmondson Avenue. East of Gwynns Falls Leakin Park, US 40 becomes Franklin Street, and becomes an expressway (formerly I-170) for a short distance between Pulaski Street and Martin Luther King Jr. Boulevard. Through this area, an alignment called Truck US 40 diverts larger vehicles onto an alternate route. US 40 passes through the Mount Vernon neighborhood and a few blocks from Baltimore's Washington Monument. After crossing the Jones Falls Expressway (I-83), US 40 follows Orleans Street, and finally becomes the Pulaski Highway as it leaves Baltimore to the northeast.

US 40, for the entire length of Pulaski Highway, closely parallels I-95. Pulaski Highway passes through Gunpowder Falls State Park near Joppa and the Aberdeen Proving Ground. Between Havre de Grace and Perryville it crosses the Susquehanna River on the Thomas J. Hatem Memorial Bridge. US 40 leaves Maryland in Elkton, crossing the border into Delaware.

=== Delaware ===
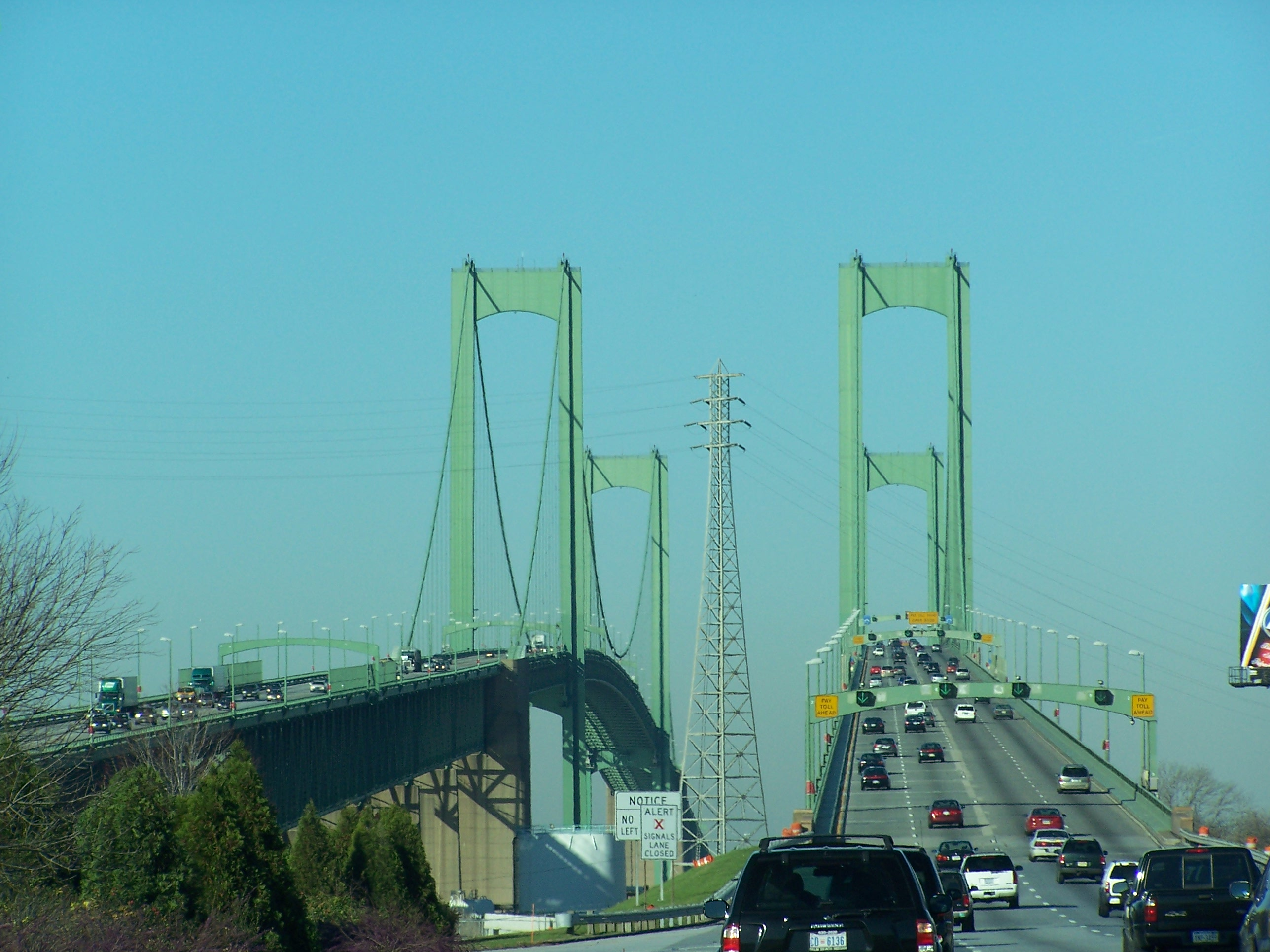
The Delaware Memorial Bridge carries US 40/I-295 across the Delaware River.

US 40 crosses Delaware for about 17 miles (27 km). Entering the state from Maryland in Glasgow, it continues along the Pulaski Highway. Much roadside commercial development slows traffic, as there are many traffic lights along the route. US 40 has an interchange with Delaware Route 1 in the community of Bear before merging with US 13 (Dupont Highway) in State Road. The concurrent routes turn north, pass the Wilmington Airport and US 40 splits to join I-295 near Wilmington Manor. US 40, along with I-295, uses the Delaware Memorial Bridge to cross the Delaware River into New Jersey.

=== New Jersey ===
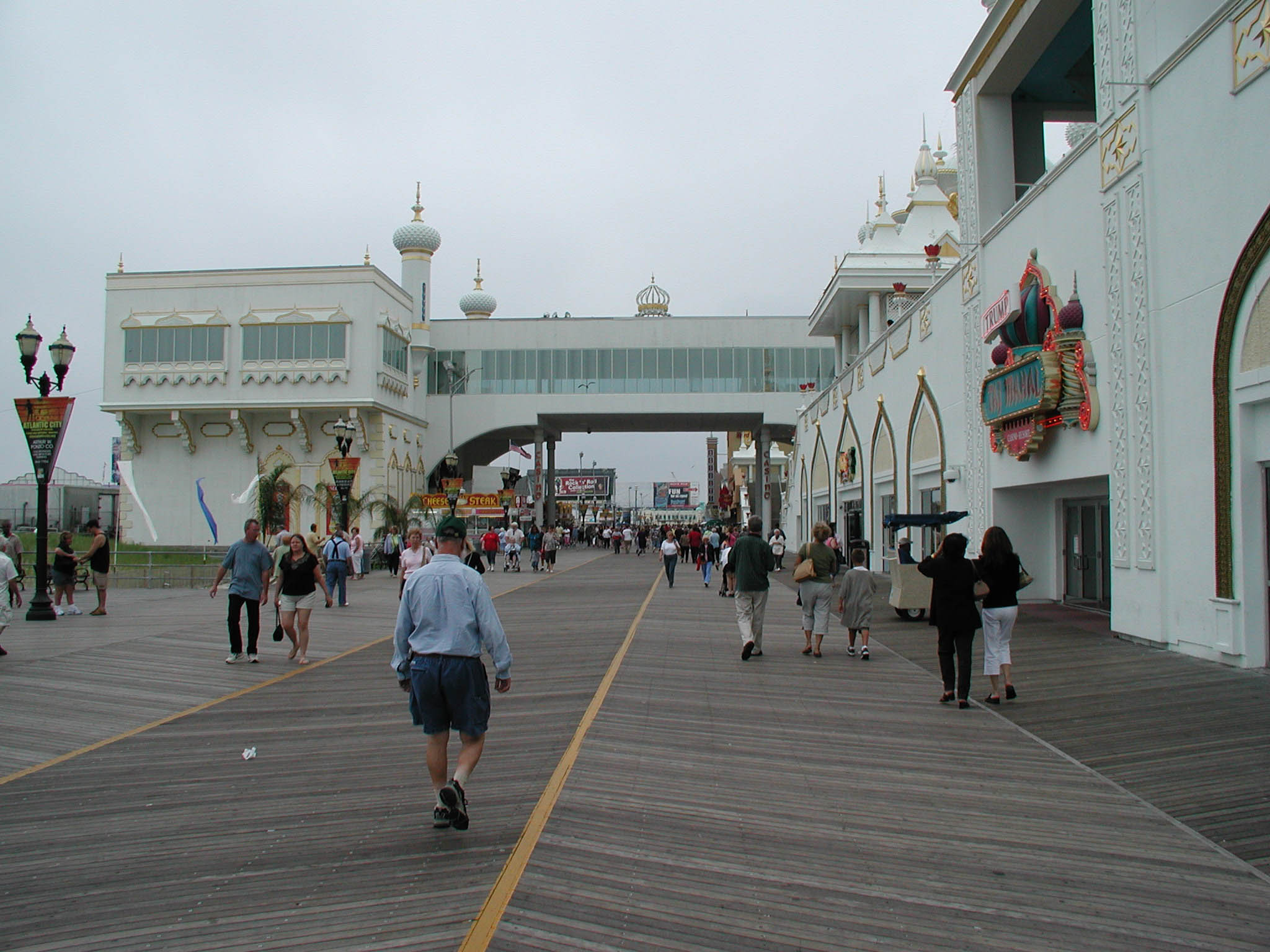
US 40 terminates in Atlantic City, two blocks from its famous Boardwalk.

US 40 enters New Jersey in Deepwater, New Jersey along with I-295. US 40 briefly joins the New Jersey Turnpike, and exits to the north of the toll booths. The route follows Wiley Road, parallel to the Turnpike, before joining Harding Highway in Carneys Point. US 40 is known as the Harding Highway through most of South Jersey. Northeast of it convergence with US 40, Harding Highway carries the Route 48 designation, although this was once part of US 40 as well.

US 40 enters the borough of Woodstown concurrently with Route 45 along West Avenue; it leaves town heading southeast. In Upper Pittsgrove Township, the road changes names to the Pole Tavern-Elmer Road. Passing through Elmer it becomes Chestnut Street and then the Elmer-Malaga Road. In Malaga, it runs concurrent with Route 47 (Delsea Drive). The route bypasses the city of Vineland to the northeast, and becomes Cape May Avenue in Hamilton Township, where it crosses Route 50 in Mays Landing.

US 40 merges with US 322 and the Black Horse Pike in McKee City. The two routes enter Atlantic City along Albany Avenue and pass the Atlantic City Airport. US 40 and US 322 both reach their eastern terminus at the intersection of Albany Avenue and Ventnor Avenue.

== History ==
=== Early roads ===
US 40's history can be traced back several centuries. Several well established Native American footpaths, including Nemacolin's Path and Mingo Path in the Maryland-Pennsylvania area, followed similar alignments to US 40. Early American colonists established roads, some following the established Native American paths, that would later serve as US 40. These included a segment of post road between Wilmington, Delaware, and Baltimore, Maryland. In 1755, during the French and Indian Wars, General Edward Braddock blazed a trail en route to capture Fort Duquesne (modern Pittsburgh, Pennsylvania). US 40 closely follows this route between Cumberland, Maryland, and Uniontown, Pennsylvania.

Early in the history of the U.S., the state of Maryland established a network of turnpikes for long-distance travel. Three of these would later serve as part of US 40: the Baltimore and Havre de Grace Turnpike, the Baltimore and Frederick Turnpike, and Bank Road. Colonel Ebenezer Zane (for whom Zanesville, Ohio was named) blazed some of the first trails across the Ohio wilderness in the last years of the 18th century. Zane's Trace, as his road was called, stretched from Wheeling, West Virginia, to Maysville, Kentucky. With some minor alignment differences, US 40 closely matches the segment from Wheeling to Zanesville.

Between the cities of Lawrence and Topeka, Kansas, US 40 follows the path of the Oregon Trail. During the 19th century, the Oregon Trail served as a major thoroughfare for people emigrating to the Pacific Northwest. Between 1850 and 1852, some 65,000–70,000 people traveled the trail.

=== National Road ===
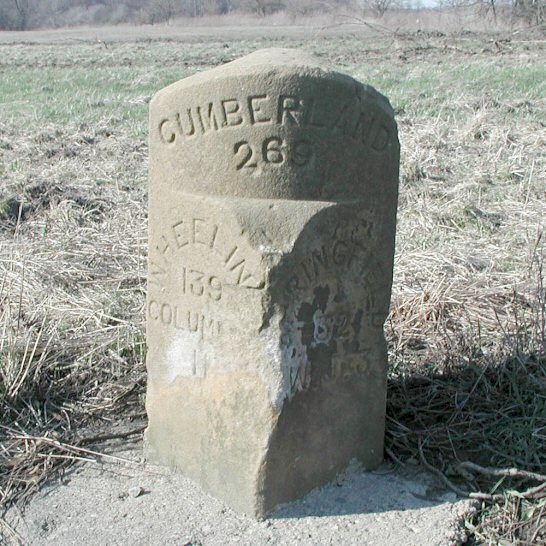
A National Road mile marker in central Ohio

In 1806, Thomas Jefferson signed into law an act of Congress establishing a National Road to connect the waters of the Atlantic Ocean with the Ohio River. The law mentions Baltimore as its eastern terminus; but the route used established Maryland turnpikes east of Cumberland. A new road was constructed from Cumberland to Wheeling, and later extended across the states of Ohio, Indiana, and Illinois. Segments of the National Road used Braddock's Road and Zane's Trace. Plans to extend the road to Missouri were never completed. The farthest western terminus for the National Road was the Old State House in Vandalia, Illinois.

The National Road was absorbed into the National Old Trails Ocean-to-Ocean highway, a route from New York, New York, to Los Angeles, California, in the early 20th century. The National Road became US 40 in the original 1925 plan for U.S. Routes. To this day, many places still name US 40 "National Road", even where the alignment was moved from the original road. Besides US 40, much of the National Road is paralleled by segments of I-68 and I-70.

=== Victory Highway ===
Most of the western section of US 40 follows the former route of Victory Highway, a road that once linked Kansas City to San Francisco. The road was named as a memorial to fallen World War I veterans. Other than two sections (one in California and one in Kansas and Colorado) most of the original route of US 40 west of Kansas City used Victory Highway. According to a 1926 guide published about the Victory Highway, it was the fastest route between San Francisco and Salt Lake City, allowing travellers to complete the 784-mile (1,262 km) trip "comfortably and in high gear in from three to four days". Controversy over the routing of US 40 over the Victory Highway led to a divided route; US 40S followed the Victory Highway and US 40N took a more northerly route.

=== Evolution ===
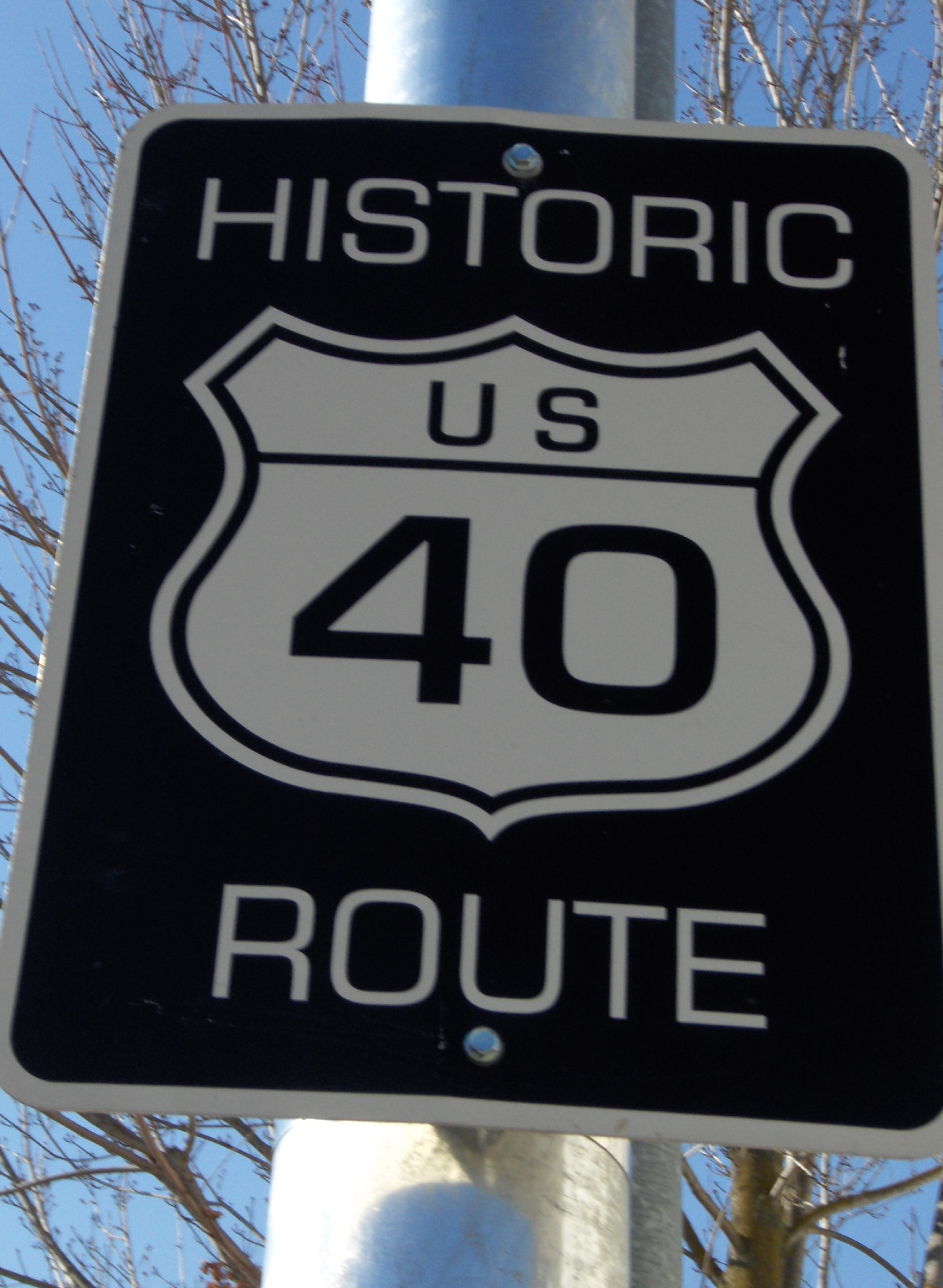
Variations of this sign are posted along old alignments in California.

US 40 was one of the original 1926 U.S. Highways.

The route was a cross-country, east–west route, as most routes with a "0" number were defined. In 1926, the road had a total mileage of 3,054 miles (4,915 km). Though the eastern terminus was planned for State Road, Delaware, by 1927 it was moved to Atlantic City, New Jersey. The western terminus was San Francisco via an auto ferry across San Francisco Bay from the Berkeley Pier in Berkeley, California. Upon completion of the San Francisco–Oakland Bay Bridge, US 40 was re-routed over the bridge, bypassing the ferry pier. Early alignments of the road featured ferries at both ends. To cross the Delaware River, ferries were used, originally from Wilmington (1927–1929) and later from New Castle (1929–1951). In 1951, the opening of the Delaware Memorial Bridge replaced the ferry service and carried US 40 across the Delaware River.

From 1926 to 1935 the route split in Manhattan, Kansas, into US 40N and US 40S routes; the two routes met again in Limon, Colorado. The US 40S route continued on to Grand Junction, Colorado. In 1935, the split routes were eliminated. US 40N between Manhattan and Limon and then US 40S from Limon to Grand Junction was replaced by US 24, the remainder was renumbered as simply US 40.

New alignments for the road were designated in Maryland in 1948 and in Utah in 1950. California's segment of the highway was decommissioned in 1964. By 1966, the western terminus moved to Reno, Nevada. The road shortened again in 1975, to its current western end at Silver Creek Junction, Utah. In 1998, the California segment was given a sort of rebirth with the designation of Historic Route 40 through that state. Further realignments occurred in Utah where the highway was re-routed for the Jordanelle Reservoir in the mid-1990s, and Kansas City, Kansas, in 1999 to make way for the Kansas Speedway. On December 1, 2008, a further realignment in Kansas City rerouted US 40 away from State Avenue and the Turner Diagonal and onto K-7 and I-70.

"In 1998 [Eddie Lange] persuaded the California legislature to designate Route 40 between Reno and San Francisco as Historic Route 40." Together with Trish Gray, the duo designed the signs and a program where local businesses could donate funds to have a sign erected near their business along the route. The signs can now be found throughout the California route and is a popular route for motorcycle clubs and other travel enthusiasts.

=== Historical route ===
==== California ====
Historic US 40 signage used in California

The former route of US 40 in California generally runs parallel to modern I-80.

- In Contra Costa County it is San Pablo Avenue, now signed as SR 123.
- Portions of Historic Route 40 exist in Vallejo, along 5th Street, Alameda Street and Broadway.
- North of Vallejo the route goes up American Canyon
- In Cordelia and Suisun City, the original route is along Cordelia Road. It is also signed as a historic route. An older alignment runs north of Cordelia Road on Pittman Road, across I-80 where it turns into Suisun Valley Road and then turns east on Rockville Road where it crosses I-80 again and turns into N. Texas Street.
- The original route is preserved as Texas Street in Fairfield.
- The original alignment between Fairfield and Vacaville can be found on Cherry Glen Road.
- In Vacaville the highway is preserved as Monte Vista Avenue.
- An older alignment goes north from Vacaville to Midway Road on Browns Valley Rd, then east before turning northeast into Dixon on Porter Road, then along an old bypass of downtown Dixon north, N. Adams Street, then north along 1st Street, across I-80 onto Currey Road, then east on Sievers Road to Pedrick Road, then north on Pedrick Road to Russell Boulevard.
- In Davis, the highway is now Russell Boulevard, then B Street to 1st Street, then Richards Blvd. to Olive Drive. A segment of the eastbound lanes of the old US 40 expressway are accessible east of Davis on CR 32A.
- In Sacramento the highway entered the city via the Tower Bridge and followed the routes of modern Capitol Avenue, SR 160 and Auburn Boulevard.
- Between Roseville and Auburn, the highway is known Pacific Street through Rocklin, then Taylor Road to northeast of Newcastle, and then Ophir Road to its junction with I-80 just south of Auburn.
- In Auburn, the route runs along both segments of Lincoln Way (connected by High Street), portions of which carry SR 49 and SR 193

Through the Sierra Nevada many portions are still drivable, crossing I-80. Portions still drivable include

- Applegate Road in Applegate
- Hampshire Rocks Road in a rural area near Cisco
- Donner Pass Road over Donner Pass and into Truckee

Between Truckee and the Nevada state line, the former route of US 40 is mostly visible from the freeway, but not drivable as a contiguous route. Portions accessible include Glenshire Drive, Hirshdale Road, and Floriston Way.

From 1954 to 1964, an alternate route US 40 was available, especially during winter, to avoid Donner Pass. The pass, elevation 7,056 feet (2,151 m), might be closed in winter. This alternate route used Beckwourth Pass, elevation of 5,221 feet (1,591 m). Since Beckwourth Pass is nearly 2,000 feet (610 m) lower than Donner Pass, it could be kept open longer.

Alt. US 40 departed from the main track of US 40 near Davis and ran north along what was then signed as US 99W into Woodland.

- From Woodland, Alt. US 40 ran north along SR 24 through Knights Landing and Robbins into Yuba City. Most of the section from Woodland to Yuba City is now signed as SR 113.
- From Yuba City, Alt. US 40 ran east through Marysville, then north through Oroville.
- Continuing north and northeast, Alt. US 40 reached Paxton, then turned south and southeast to Quincy and Beckwourth.
- East of Beckwourth Pass, Alt. US 40 descended to meet US 395 at what is now Hallelujah Junction, and followed US 395 into Reno to meet mainline US 40.

The section from Marysville to US 395 was then still an extension of SR 24, but is now signed as SR 70, although much of the old highway was moved further west before Lake Oroville was dammed and flooded in 1968.

==== Nevada ====
In Nevada, US 40 was also directly replaced by I-80. All of the I-80 business loops use the historical route of US 40. In the Truckee Meadows the route is still drivable as 3rd Street in Verdi and 4th Street in Reno and Victorian Avenue in Sparks. In rural Nevada the highway forms the business loops for Wadsworth, Fernley, Lovelock, Winnemucca, Battle Mountain, Carlin, Elko, and West Wendover. The route and its former alignments can be seen (and some still driven) all along the routing of I-80. Much of the right-of-way of old US 40 has been either demolished or left to natural degradation.

==== Utah ====
In Wendover the former route of US 40 is signed as SR 58 and runs along the Wendover Cut-off, south of (and in view of) I-80, across the Bonneville Salt Flats. The route re-emerges from the shadow of I-80 as SR 138 through Grantsville and Tooele. I-80 was directly paved over the former route of US 40 through Parley's Canyon and over Parley's Summit, with very little of the original pavement remaining through the mountains. East of the Wasatch Mountains is the modern terminus of US 40.

Two routes existed through Salt Lake City. West of Temple Square US 40 was consistently routed on North Temple Street. East of Temple Square US 40 had two alignments, originally departing Temple Square south along State Street concurrently with US 91 and US 89 to 2100 south. The road then used 2100 South and Parley's Way, towards Parley's Canyon. Later US 40 was moved to Foothill Drive, along modern SR 186, with the 2100 south routing becoming Alt. US 40. The two routes converged at the mouth of Parley's Canyon.

== Major intersections ==
Utah
I-80 / US 189 in Silver Creek Junction. US 40/US 189 have a hidden concurrency to Heber City.
US 191 in Duchesne. The highways travel concurrently to Vernal.
Colorado
US 34 in Granby
I-70 / US 6 east of Empire. The highways travel concurrently to east of Idaho Springs, and intersect again in Golden. There are numerous intersections and overlaps of US 40 and I-70 between here and Maryland.
US 287 in Denver. The highways travel concurrently to east of Kit Carson.
I-25 / US 6 / US 85 / US 87 in Denver
I-225 in Aurora
I-70 / US 36 in Aurora. I-70/US 40 travels concurrently to Limon. US 36/US 40 travel concurrently to Byers.
US 24 west-northwest of Limon. The highways travel concurrently to east-southeast of Limon.
US 385 in Cheyenne Wells. The highways travel concurrently to east of Cheyenne Wells.
Kansas
US 83 in Oakley. The highways travel concurrently through the city.
US 283 in WaKeeney
US 183 in Hays
US 281 south of Russell
I-135 / US 81 northwest of Salina
US 77 in Junction City
I-470 / US 75 in Topeka. US 40/US 75 travels concurrently through the city.
US 59 in Lawrence. The highways travel concurrently through the city.
US 24 / US 59 in Lawrence. US 24/US 40 travels concurrently to Kansas City, Missouri.
US 73 on the Kansas City–Bonner Springs city line. The highways travel concurrently into Bonner Springs proper.
I-70 / US 73 in Bonner Springs. I-70/US 40 travels concurrently to Kansas City, Missouri.
I-435 on the Edwardsville–Kansas City city line
I-635 in Kansas City
US 69 in Kansas City. The highways travel concurrently through the city.
I-670 in Kansas City
US 69 / US 169 in Kansas City. US 40/US 169 travels concurrently to Kansas City, Missouri.
Missouri
I-35 in Kansas City. The highways travel concurrently through the city.
I-29 / I-35 / I-70 / US 24 / US 71 in Kansas City. US 40/US 71 travels concurrently through Kansas City.
I-470 in Independence
US 65 south of Marshall
US 54 in Kingdom City
I-64 / I-70 / US 61 in Wentzville. I-64/US 40 travels concurrently to East St. Louis, Illinois. US 40/US 61 travels concurrently to the Frontenac–Ladue city line.
I-270 in Town and Country
US 61 / US 67 on the Frontenac–Ladue city line
I-170 in Richmond Heights
I-44 / I-55 in St. Louis. I-55/US 40 travels concurrently to Troy, Illinois.
Illinois
I-64 / I-70 in East St. Louis. I-70/US 40 travel concurrently to Troy.
I-255 in Collinsville
US 51 in Vandalia. The highways travel concurrently to east of Vandalia.
US 45 in Effingham. The highways travel concurrently through the city.
Indiana
US 41 / US 150 in Terre Haute
US 231 north-northwest of Cloverdale
I-74 / I-465 / US 36 in Indianapolis. The highways travel concurrently through the city.
I-69 in Indianapolis. The highways travel concurrently through the city.
I-65 in Indianapolis
I-74 / US 421 in Indianapolis. US 40/US 421 travels concurrently through the city.
US 52 in Indianapolis. The highways travel concurrently through the city.
US 27 in Richmond
Indiana–Ohio line
I-70 / US 35 in Richmond, IN, and Jefferson Township, OH
Ohio
US 127 in Monroe Township
I-75 in Vandalia
US 68 west of Springfield
US 42 in Lafayette
I-270 in Lincoln Village
US 23 / US 33 / US 62 in Columbus. US 40/US 62 travels concurrently through the city.
I-71 in Columbus
I-270 in Columbus
US 22 in Zanesville. The highways travel concurrently to Cambridge.
I-77 in Cambridge Township
US 250 in Bridgeport. The highways travel concurrently to Wheeling, West Virginia.
West Virginia
I-70 / US 250 in Wheeling
Pennsylvania
US 19 in Washington. The highways travel concurrently to South Strabane Township.
I-79 in Amwell Township
US 119 in Uniontown. The highways travel concurrently to South Union Township.
Maryland
I-68 / US 219 in Keysers Ridge. I-68/US 40 travels concurrently to Hancock. US 40/US 219 travels concurrently to east-southeast of Grantsville.
US 220 in Cumberland. The highways travel concurrently through the city.
I-68 / I-70 / US 522 north-northwest of Hancock. I-70/US 40 travels concurrently to Indian Springs. US 40/US 522 travels concurrently to Hancock.
I-81 in Hagerstown
US 11 in Hagerstown
US 15 in Frederick. The highways travel concurrently through the city.
US 15 / US 340 in Frederick
I-70 / I-270 in Frederick. I-70/US 40 travels concurrently to West Friendship. Between Colorado and here, I-70 has numerous intersections and overlaps with US 40.
US 29 in Ellicott City
I-695 in Catonsville
I-895 in Baltimore
I-95 in Baltimore
I-695 in Rosedale
Delaware
US 13 in State Road. The highways travel concurrently to Wilmington Manor.
US 202 in Wilmington Manor
I-295 / US 13 in Wilmington Manor. I-295/US 40 travels concurrently to Pennsville Township, New Jersey.
New Jersey
US 130 in Pennsville Township
US 322 in Hamilton Township. The highways travel concurrently to Atlantic City.
US 9 in Pleasantville
Atlantic Avenue / Pacific Avenue in Atlantic City

== See also ==
- National Road
- All-American Road
- U.S. Route 140 (decommissioned 1980)
- U.S. Route 240 (decommissioned 1971)
- U.S. Route 340
- Special routes of U.S. Route 40
