= WESI =

WESI may refer to:

- WESI-LP, a low-power radio station (92.3 FM) licensed to serve Sugar Hill, Georgia, United States
- WGHL, a radio station (105.1 FM) licensed to serve Shepherdsville, Kentucky, United States, which held the call sign WESI from 2013 to 2014
- WVRX, a radio station (104.9 FM) licensed to serve Strasburg, Virginia, United States, which held the call sign WESI from 1986 to 1992
