= XHZS-FM =

XHZS-FM may refer to:

- XHZS-FM (Sinaloa) 100.3 in Mazatlán
- XHZS-FM (Veracruz) 92.3 in Coatzacoalcos (formerly also on 1170 AM)
