= KKHI =

KKHI may refer to:

== Current stations ==
- KKHI (FM), a radio station (95.9 FM) licensed to serve Kaunakakai, Hawaii, United States, holds the call letters as of 2016

== Former stations ==
- KZDG, a radio station (1550 AM) in San Francisco, California, United States, which held the call sign KKHI from 1961 to 1994
- KGMZ-FM, a radio stations (95.7 FM) in San Francisco, California, which held the call sign KKHI-FM from 1961 to 1994
- KHAT, a radio station (1210 AM) licensed to Laramie, Wyoming, United States, which held the call letters previously from 2002 to 2003
- KXWA, a radio station (101.9 FM) licensed to Centennial, Colorado, which held the call letters from 2008 to 2011
- KMKV (FM), a radio station (100.7 FM) licensed to serve Kihei, Hawaii, which held the call sign KKHI from 2011 to 2015
- KQSC, a radio station (1530 AM) licensed to serve Colorado Springs, Colorado, which held the call sign KKHI in 2015
- KKHG, a defunct radio station (92.3 FM) formerly licensed to serve Hugo, Colorado, United States, which held the call sign KKHI from 2015 to 2016
