= WHKQ =

- Louisa, Kentucky; United States
- Broadcast area: Huntington-Ashland
- Frequency: 92.3 MHz

Programming
- Format: Contemporary Christian
- Affiliations: K-Love

Ownership
- Owner: Expression Production Group, LLC
- Sister stations: WOKT

History
- First air date: 1991
- Former call signs: WSAC (1990–2001); WZAQ (2001–2017)

Technical information
- Licensing authority: FCC
- Facility ID: 38568
- Class: A
- Power: 4,500 watts
- HAAT: 115 meters (377 ft)
- Transmitter coordinates: 38°10′33.0″N 82°37′39.0″W

Links
- Public license information: Public file; LMS
- Webcast: WHKQ Webstream
- Website: WHKQ Online

WHKQ is a Contemporary Christian formatted broadcast radio station licensed to Louisa, Kentucky, serving Lawrence and Boyd counties in Kentucky and Wayne County in West Virginia. WHKQ is owned and operated by Expression Production Group, LLC.

== History ==
On October 1, 2016, the then-WZAQ changed their format from adult hits (as "Jack FM") to Educational Media Foundation's "K-Love" contemporary Christian format. The station changed its call sign to the current WHKQ on January 24, 2017.
