= XHRTPZ-FM =

Community radio station in Tepoztlán, Morelos

Tepoztlán, Morelos; Mexico
- Frequency: 92.3 MHz
- Branding: Radio Tepoztlán

Programming
- Format: Community radio

Ownership
- Owner: Teponaztle Cultura y Comunicación, A.C.

History
- First air date: February 19, 2010 (permit)
- Former call signs: XHSCIX-FM (2022) (Note: Concession was reawarded after a discontinuity in February 2022. Call sign changed back in September.)
- Call sign meaning: From "Radio Tepoztlán"

Technical information
- Class: A (Note: Restricted to a 10-kilometer radius from the transmitter site instead of 24 kilometers.)
- ERP: 1.293 kW
- HAAT: -287.1 m
- Transmitter coordinates: 18°59′25.33″N 99°06′22.61″W

Links
- Website: radiotepoztlan.org

XHRTPZ-FM is a community radio station in Tepoztlán, Morelos, Mexico, broadcasting on 92.3 FM. It is owned by Teponaztle Cultura y Comunicación, A.C. and brands as Radio Tepoztlán.

== History ==
XHRTPZ received its permit in February 2010. In February 2022, as the result of a failure to timely renew its concession, it received a new one and a new call sign, XHSCIX-FM. The call sign on the new concession was changed back to XHRTPZ-FM in September 2022.
