= KFII =

- Hugo, Colorado; United States
- Broadcast area: Eastern Colorado
- Frequency: 92.3 MHz
- Branding: 92.3 KFI

Programming
- Format: Classic hits

Ownership
- Owner: ScarboroughRadio, LLC

History
- First air date: 2023

Technical information
- Licensing authority: FCC
- Facility ID: 762662
- Class: A
- ERP: 3,500 watts
- HAAT: 96 meters
- Transmitter coordinates: 39°16′37.7″N 103°29′47.0″W

Links
- Public license information: Public file; LMS
- Website: 923kfi.com

KFII (92.3 FM) is a radio station licensed to Hugo, Colorado.

The station, owned by Scott Scarborough of ScarboroughRadio, LLC, obtained the rights to the 92.3 frequency through an FCC auction. It began broadcasting with a classic hits format in 2023. The station broadcasts at a power of 3500 watts ERP from a transmitter located atop a grain elevator along I-70 north of Hugo. The 92.3 frequency was previously allocated to a now silent station, KKHG, also licensed to Hugo.
