= KKHG =

Radio station in Hugo, Colorado (2008–2016)

- Hugo, Colorado; United States
- Frequency: 92.3 MHz

Ownership
- Owner: Kona Coast Radio, LLC

History
- First air date: 2008
- Last air date: April 12, 2016
- Former call signs: KHIH (November 4, 2008—January 28, 2012); KFCY (January 29, 2012—July 14, 2013); KDAB (July 15, 2013—June 7, 2015); KVXQ (June 8—July 30, 2015); KRKY-FM (July 31—August 19, 2015); KMOW (August 20—October 15, 2015); KKHI (October 16, 2015—January 18, 2016); KKHG (January 18—April 12, 2016)

Technical information
- Licensing authority: FCC
- Facility ID: 170961
- Class: A
- ERP: 6,000 watts
- HAAT: 87 meters
- Transmitter coordinates: 39°06′19.9″N 103°40′31.8″W

Links
- Public license information: Public file; LMS

KKHG was a radio station on 92.3 FM in Hugo, Colorado. It was owned by Kona Coast Radio.

== History ==
KHIH received its first callsign in 2008 and its license in 2011. It changed callsigns often and was one of several Kona Coast stations to bear the KKHI calls, now used on a sister station in Hawaii.

For most of its life, KKHG was silent under special temporary authority, first because of the move of co-owned KIIQ/KBUD, and then because Kona Coast sought to build common studios for the two stations (early operations for the station used a temporary studio at the transmitters). The licenses of KKHG and KBUD were surrendered in April 2016.
