= ZCBN =

Coordinates: 18°25′29″N 64°37′21″W

- Tortola; British Virgin Islands
- Frequency: 92.3 MHz
- Branding: Tradewinds 92.3

Programming
- Language: English
- Format: Eclectic

Ownership
- Owner: Caribbean Broadcast Network; (Caribbean Broadcast Network (BVI), Ltd.)

History
- Call sign meaning: Caribbean Broadcast Network

Technical information
- Licensing authority: Telecommunications Regulatory Commission
- Class: B1
- ERP: 4 kW
- HAAT: 450 metres

ZCBN/92.3 was an FM radio station broadcasting from the British Virgin Islands, owned by the Caribbean Broadcast Network. It broadcasts a variety of different kinds of music, described on its website as a mix of "pop, classic country, classic rock & easy listening...blended with reggae & calypso". Its sister station is ZBTV.

ZCBN’s most recent licence expired on 29 June 2021.
