= Washington Township, Putnam County, Indiana =

Washington Township
- Township
- Coordinates: 39°32′35″N 86°57′19″W
- Country: United States
- State: Indiana
- County: Putnam

Government
  - Type: Indiana township

Area
  - Total: 53.28 sq mi (138.0 km^{2})
  - Land: 52.97 sq mi (137.2 km^{2})
  - Water: 0.31 sq mi (0.80 km^{2})
- Elevation: 712 ft (217 m)

Population (2020)
  - Total: 2,488
  - Density: 46.97/sq mi (18.14/km^{2})
- Time zone: UTC-5 (Eastern (EST))
  - Summer (DST): UTC-4 (EDT)
- Area code: 765
- FIPS code: 18-80972
- GNIS feature ID: 454015

Washington Township is one of thirteen townships in Putnam County, Indiana. As of the 2020 census, its population was 2,488 (slightly down from 2,493 at 2010) and it contained 1,071 housing units.

== History ==
The Putnam County Bridge No. 159 and Lycurgus Stoner House are listed on the National Register of Historic Places.

== Geography ==
According to the 2010 census, the township has a total area of 53.28 square miles (138.0 km^{2}), of which 52.97 square miles (137.2 km^{2}) (or 99.42%) is land and 0.31 square miles (0.80 km^{2}) (or 0.58%) is water.

=== Unincorporated towns ===
- Cagle Mill at 39.4872662°N 86.9397341°W
- Hirt Corner at 39.4736540°N 87.0147358°W
- Manhattan at 39.5550444°N 86.9275114°W
- Pleasant Gardens at 39.5514328°N 86.9644567°W
- Raab Crossroads at 39.4878211°N 86.9919577°W
- Reelsville at 39.5575439°N 86.9669567°W

(This list is based on USGS data and may include former settlements.)
