= Reelsville, Indiana =

- Unincorporated community
- Location within Indiana Location within the United States
- Coordinates: 39°33′27″N 86°58′1″W
- Country: United States
- State: Indiana
- County: Putnam
- Township: Washington
- Elevation: 702 ft (214 m)
- Time zone: UTC-5 (Eastern (EST))
  - Summer (DST): UTC-4 (EDT)
- ZIP code: 46171
- Area code: 765
- GNIS feature ID: 441866

Reelsville is an unincorporated community in central Washington Township, Putnam County, in the U.S. state of Indiana. It lies along local roads just north of U.S. Route 40, southwest of the city of Greencastle, the county seat of Putnam County. Although Reelsville is unincorporated, it has a post office, with the ZIP code of 46171.

== History ==
Reelsville was laid out in 1852 by John Reel, and named for him. A post office has been in operation at Reelsville since 1852.
