= XHPCMQ-FM =

Radio station in Cadereyta de Montes, Querétaro, Mexico

Cadereyta de Montes, Querétaro, Mexico; Mexico
- Frequency: 92.3 MHz
- Branding: La Ke Buena

Programming
- Format: Regional Mexican
- Affiliations: Radiópolis

Ownership
- Owner: Grupo Ultra; (Radio Cadereyta XHPCMQ, S.A. de C.V.)
- Operator: Grupo Edikam Medios

History
- First air date: June 3, 2018
- Call sign meaning: Cadereyta de Montes, Querétaro

Technical information
- Class: AA
- ERP: 6 kW
- HAAT: 30.3 meters
- Transmitter coordinates: 20°41′50″N 99°49′6.6″W

Links
- Website: kebuenaqro.mx

XHPCMQ-FM is a radio station on 92.3 FM in Cadereyta de Montes, Querétaro, Mexico. It is operated by Grupo Edikam Medios and carries the La Ke Buena regional Mexican format from Radiópolis.

== History ==
XHPCMQ was awarded in the IFT-4 radio auction of 2017 and came to air on June 3, 2018. The station was originally known as Ultra and aired a romantic music format until flipping to the Ke Buena format on April 8, 2024.
