= Manhattan, Indiana =

- Unincorporated community
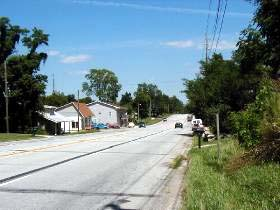
- Manhattan is a small town along the National Road.

- Location within Indiana Location within the United States
- Coordinates: 39°33′18″N 86°55′39″W
- Country: United States
- State: Indiana
- County: Putnam
- Township: Washington
- Elevation: 643 ft (196 m)
- Time zone: UTC-5 (Eastern (EST))
  - Summer (DST): UTC-4 (EDT)
- ZIP code: 46171
- Area code: 765
- GNIS feature ID: 438515

Manhattan is an unincorporated community in central Washington Township, Putnam County, in the U.S. state of Indiana.

== History ==
Manhattan was laid out in 1829 when the National Road was extended to that point. The community was named after Manhattan, in New York. A post office was established at Manhattan in 1830, and remained in operation until it was discontinued in 1905.

== Geography ==
Manhattan lies on U.S. Route 40, approximately six miles southwest of the city of Greencastle.
