= KSAR =

- Thayer, Missouri; United States
- Frequency: 92.3 MHz
- Branding: "KSAR 92.3 FM"

Programming
- Format: Full service
- Affiliations: CBS News Radio; CBS Sports Radio; Westwood One

Ownership
- Owner: Bragg Broadcasting Corporation

Technical information
- Licensing authority: FCC
- Facility ID: 87970
- Class: C2
- ERP: 50,000 watts
- HAAT: 130 metres (430 ft)
- Transmitter coordinates: 36°21′58″N 91°28′35″W

Links
- Public license information: Public file; LMS
- Webcast: Listen Live
- Website: www.myhometownradiostations.com/ksar___92_3_fm

KSAR (92.3 FM) is a radio station licensed to serve the community of Thayer, Missouri. The station is owned by Bragg Broadcasting Corporation, and airs a full service radio format.

The station was assigned the KSAR call letters by the Federal Communications Commission on March 10, 2000.
