= Caribbean Broadcast Network =

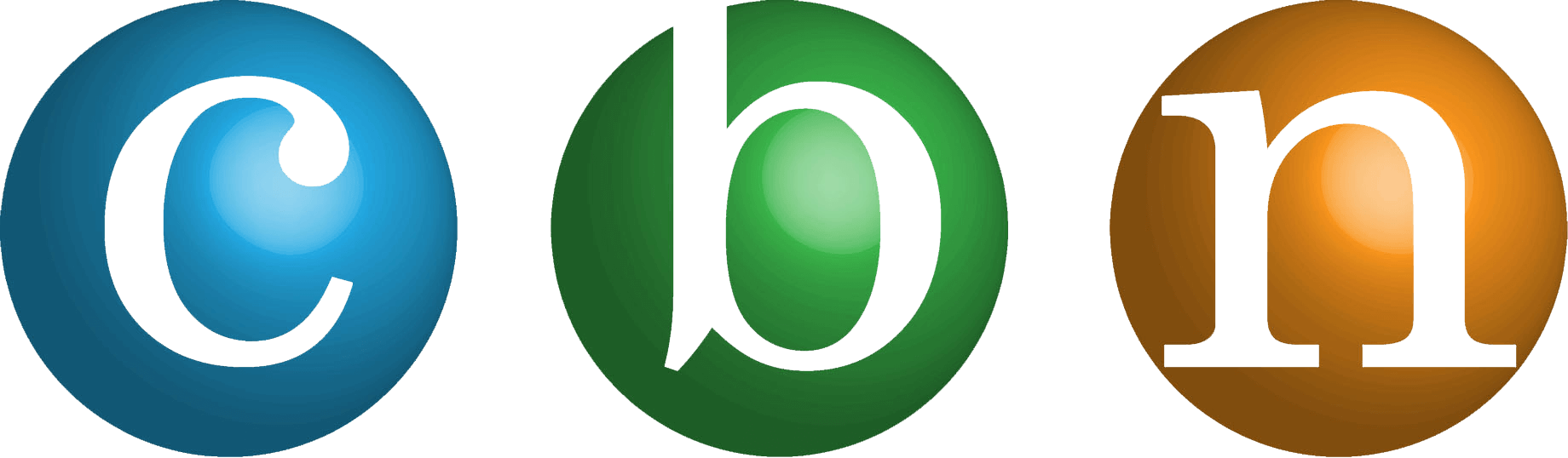
- Road Town, British Virgin Islands
- Channels: Digital: 101 (Cable)

Ownership
- Owner: Caribbean Broadcast Network (BVI) Limited

History
- Founded: November 1973
- Former call signs: ZBTV

Links
- Website: www.cbnvirginislands.com

The Caribbean Broadcast Network (CBN) is the local television station for Road Town, and the rest of the British Virgin Islands. Owned locally by Caribbean Broadcast Network (BVI) Limited, the station broadcasts a 24-hour schedule of local entertainment, news, sports and religious programming, along with infomercials and movies.

CBN was founded in 2005 replacing ZBTV. It started broadcasting in November 1973 on channel 5, its schedule as of 1979 consisted mainly of American television series and some religious programming. The station in 1978 threatened against WTJX-TV for the creation of a relay station on the same frequency.
