= WYGE =

- London, Kentucky, USA; United States
- Frequency: 92.3 MHz
- Branding: Good News Outreach

Programming
- Format: Christian

Ownership
- Owner: Ethel Huff Broadcasting, LLC

History
- First air date: November 24, 1994

Technical information
- Licensing authority: FCC
- Facility ID: 19794
- Class: C2
- ERP: 23,500 Watts
- HAAT: 223 meters (732 feet)
- Transmitter coordinates: 37°09′01″N 83°59′32″W

Links
- Public license information: Public file; LMS
- Website: wygeradio.org

WYGE (92.3 FM) is a radio station licensed to serve London, Kentucky, United States. The station is owned by Ethel Huff Broadcasting, LLC and airs Christian content.

The station has been assigned these call letters by the Federal Communications Commission since February 22, 1991.
