= KSVL =

- Smith, Nevada; United States
- Frequency: 92.3 MHz

Programming
- Format: News/Talk

Ownership
- Owner: Jerry Evans; (The Evans Broadcast Company, Inc.)

History
- First air date: 2002

Technical information
- Licensing authority: FCC
- Facility ID: 88665
- Class: C3
- ERP: 490 watts
- HAAT: 624 meters (2,047 ft)
- Transmitter coordinates: 38°41′6″N 119°11′4″W

Links
- Public license information: Public file; LMS

KSVL (92.3 FM) is a radio station licensed to serve Smith, Nevada and the surrounding area. The station is owned by Jerry Evans, through The Evans Broadcast Company, Inc. It airs a news and talk format.

The station was assigned the KSVL call letters by the Federal Communications Commission on September 24, 1999. Since 2019, KSVL 92.3 has been run by Evans Broadcast Company.

== Ownership ==
In March 2007, Lyon Broadcasters Inc. made a deal to buy KSVL from Donegal Inc. James Foss, Lyon Broadcasters’ president, told the Northern Nevada Business Weekly that he planned to add local news and a talk show hosted by a local personality to the station's automated alternative rock format.
