= KHRB-LP =

- Harrisburg, Oregon; United States
- Frequency: 92.3 MHz

Programming
- Format: Contemporary Christian

Ownership
- Owner: Rock Solid Ministries

Technical information
- Licensing authority: FCC
- Facility ID: 134838
- Class: L1
- ERP: 100 watts
- HAAT: 2.0 meters (6.6 ft)
- Transmitter coordinates: 44°16′21″N 123°10′15″W

Links
- Public license information: LMS

KHRB-LP (92.3 FM) is a radio station broadcasting a contemporary Christian music format. Licensed to Harrisburg, Oregon, United States, the station is currently owned by Rock Solid Ministries.
