= WENQ =

Radio station in Grenada, Mississippi

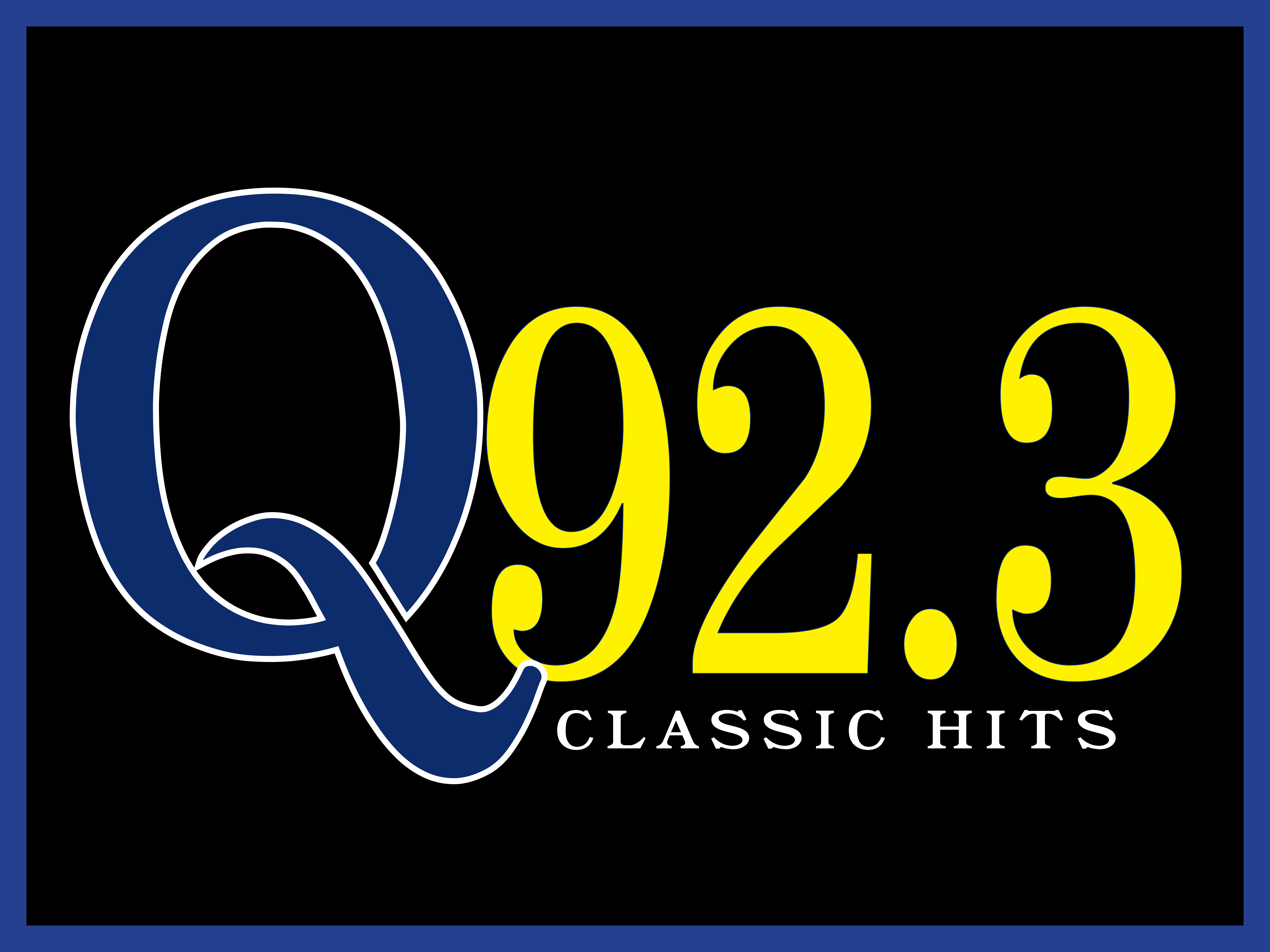
- Grenada, Mississippi; United States
- Frequency: 92.3 MHz
- Branding: Q92

Programming
- Format: Classic hits

Ownership
- Owner: Tammy Evans; (Rayanna Group LLC)

History
- First air date: 2003

Technical information
- Licensing authority: FCC
- Facility ID: 77811
- Class: A
- ERP: 4,100 watts
- HAAT: 121 meters (397 ft)
- Transmitter coordinates: 33°51′33″N 89°55′13″W

Links
- Public license information: Public file; LMS
- Webcast: Listen Live
- Website: theradiostations.net

WENQ (92.3 FM) is a radio station broadcasting a classic hits music format. Licensed to Grenada, Mississippi, United States, the station is currently owned by Tammy Evans, through licensee Rayanna Group LLC.
