= KREU =

Radio station in Roland, Oklahoma (Fort Smith, Arkansas)

- Roland, Oklahoma; United States
- Broadcast area: Ft. Smith, Arkansas
- Frequency: 92.3 MHz
- Branding: La Raza 92.3

Programming
- Format: Spanish Variety

Ownership
- Owner: Star 92 Co.

Technical information
- Licensing authority: FCC
- Facility ID: 59692
- Class: A
- ERP: 740 watts
- HAAT: 284.0
- Transmitter coordinates: 35°31′22″N 94°23′32″W

Links
- Public license information: KREU Public file; LMS
- Webcast: https://streamdb9web.securenetsystems.net/cirrusencore/KREU
- Website: http://www.laraza923.com

KREU (92.3 FM) is a radio station broadcasting a Spanish Variety format. Licensed to Roland, Oklahoma, United States, it serves the Ft. Smith area. The station is currently owned by Star 92 Co.
