= WQLI =

- Meigs, Georgia; United States
- Frequency: 92.3 MHz
- Branding: Q92.3

Programming
- Format: Adult contemporary
- Affiliations: ABC Radio

Ownership
- Owner: Kevin L. Dowdy; (Flint Media, Inc.)

History
- First air date: September 8, 2000

Technical information
- Licensing authority: FCC
- Facility ID: 15915
- Class: A
- ERP: 6,000 watts
- HAAT: 100 meters
- Transmitter coordinates: 31°5′12.00″N 84°12′10.00″W

Links
- Public license information: Public file; LMS
- Website: WQLI Online

WQLI (92.3 FM) is a radio station broadcasting an adult contemporary format. Licensed to Meigs, Georgia, United States, the station is currently owned by Kevin L. Dowdy, through licensee Flint Media, Inc., and features programming from ABC Radio .
