= WMOQ =

- Bostwick, Georgia; United States
- Frequency: 92.3 MHz

Programming
- Format: Classic Country
- Affiliations: ABC Radio

Ownership
- Owner: Bostwick Broadcasting Group, Inc.

History
- Former call signs: WOMQ (1992–present)

Technical information
- Licensing authority: FCC
- Facility ID: 6479
- Class: A
- ERP: 3,000 watts
- HAAT: 100.0 meters
- Transmitter coordinates: 33°44′49.00″N 83°33′23.00″W

Links
- Public license information: Public file; LMS
- Website: wmoqfm.com

WMOQ (92.3 FM) is a radio station broadcasting a classic country format licensed to Bostwick, Georgia, United States. The station is currently owned by Bostwick Broadcasting Group, Inc. and features programming from ABC Radio .
