= XHZS-FM (Veracruz) =

Radio station in Coatzacoalcos, Veracruz, Mexico

- Coatzacoalcos, Veracruz; Mexico
- Frequency: 92.3 MHz
- Branding: Radio Hit, La Explosiva

Programming
- Format: Regional Mexican

Ownership
- Owner: Emisoras Mexicanas de Veracruz, S.A. de C.V.

History
- First air date: March 18, 1960; 1996 (FM)
- Former call signs: XEZS-AM (1960–2017)
- Former frequencies: 1170 kHz (1960–2017)

Technical information
- Licensing authority: CRT
- Class: B1
- ERP: 10,000 watts
- HAAT: 78.9 meters
- Transmitter coordinates: 18°8′19.4″N 94°26′24.3″W

Links
- Website: www.radiohit.com.mx

XHZS-FM is a radio station in Coatzacoalcos, Veracruz. Broadcasting on 92.3 FM, XHZS is owned by Emisoras Mexicanas de Veracruz and known as Radio Hit, La Explosiva, which offers a Regional Mexican format.

== History ==
Logo used until 2017

XEZS-AM 1170 signed on March 18, 1960; the station was owned by Carlos Armando Caballero Mendoza. In 1996, XEZS expanded to FM with the signing on of XHZS-FM on 92.3, which had been authorized as a combo in 1994. The AM station broadcast with 2,500 watts during the day and 1,000 at night.

On October 15, 2017, XEZS ceased AM broadcasts after 57 years. The station also formally surrendered its AM radio frequency in a letter dated October 2.
