= WRVU-LP =

- Grand Rapids, Michigan; United States
- Frequency: 92.3 MHz
- Branding: Radio Vision

Programming
- Format: Spanish religious

Ownership
- Owner: Iglesia Casa Del Rey

Technical information
- Licensing authority: FCC
- Facility ID: 195132
- Class: LP1
- ERP: 100 watts
- HAAT: 32 metres (105 ft)
- Transmitter coordinates: 42°51′03.1″N 85°36′26.1″W

Links
- Public license information: LMS
- Webcast: Listen live
- Website: www.radiovisioncdr.com

WRVU-LP (92.3 FM, "Radio Vision") is a radio station licensed to serve the community of Grand Rapids, Michigan. The station is owned by Iglesia Casa Del Rey and airs a Spanish religious format.

The station was assigned the WRVU-LP call letters by the Federal Communications Commission on December 6, 2014.
