= CHNT-FM =

Canadian First Nations community radio station

Coordinates: 47°36′28″N 79°28′22″W

- Notre-Dame-du-Nord, Quebec; Canada
- Broadcast area: Timiskaming First Nation
- Frequency: 92.3 MHz
- Branding: The Coyote

Programming
- Format: First Nations community radio

Ownership
- Owner: Timiskaming First Nation/Economic Development

History
- First air date: 2003

Technical information
- ERP: 50 watts
- HAAT: 24 metres

Links
- Website: chnt.ca

CHNT-FM is a First Nations community radio station that operates at 92.3 MHz (FM) on the Timiskaming First Nation near Notre-Dame-du-Nord, Quebec, Canada.

The station is operated by Timiskaming First Nation/Economic Development and the Minwadjimowin Algonquin Communication Society. According to radio-locator, the station was granted on May 12, 2000 and had launched CHNT-FM on the air at 92.3 MHz with 50 watts of power sometime after. There's no known records regarding the radio station CHNT-FM on the Canadian Radio-Television and Telecommunications Commission (CRTC) website.

In 2019, the station upgraded its transmitter.
