= Pleasant Gardens, Indiana =

- Unincorporated community
- Location within Indiana Location within the United States
- Coordinates: 39°33′05″N 86°57′52″W
- Country: United States
- State: Indiana
- County: Putnam
- Township: Washington
- Elevation: 702 ft (214 m)
- Time zone: UTC-5 (Eastern (EST))
  - Summer (DST): UTC-4 (EDT)
- ZIP code: 46171
- Area code: 765
- GNIS feature ID: 441242

Pleasant Gardens is an unincorporated community in Washington Township, Putnam County, in the U.S. state of Indiana.

== History ==
Pleasant Gardens was laid out in 1830.
