= WESI-LP =

- Sugar Hill, Georgia; United States
- Frequency: 92.3 MHz
- Branding: "Radio Voz Elim"

Programming
- Format: Spanish religious

Ownership
- Owner: Iglesia de Cristo Elim Georgia, Inc.

Technical information
- Licensing authority: FCC
- Facility ID: 197628
- Class: L1
- ERP: 100 watts
- HAAT: 28 metres (92 ft)
- Transmitter coordinates: 34.2644°N 84.1083°W

Links
- Public license information: LMS
- Webcast: Listen Live
- Website: Official Website

WESI-LP (92.3 FM) is a radio station licensed to serve the community of Sugar Hill, Georgia. The station is owned by Iglesia de Cristo Elim Georgia, Inc., and airs a Spanish religious format.

The station was assigned the WESI-LP call letters by the Federal Communications Commission on February 18, 2015.
