= Hugo, Colorado =

Town in Colorado, United States

- Statutory Town
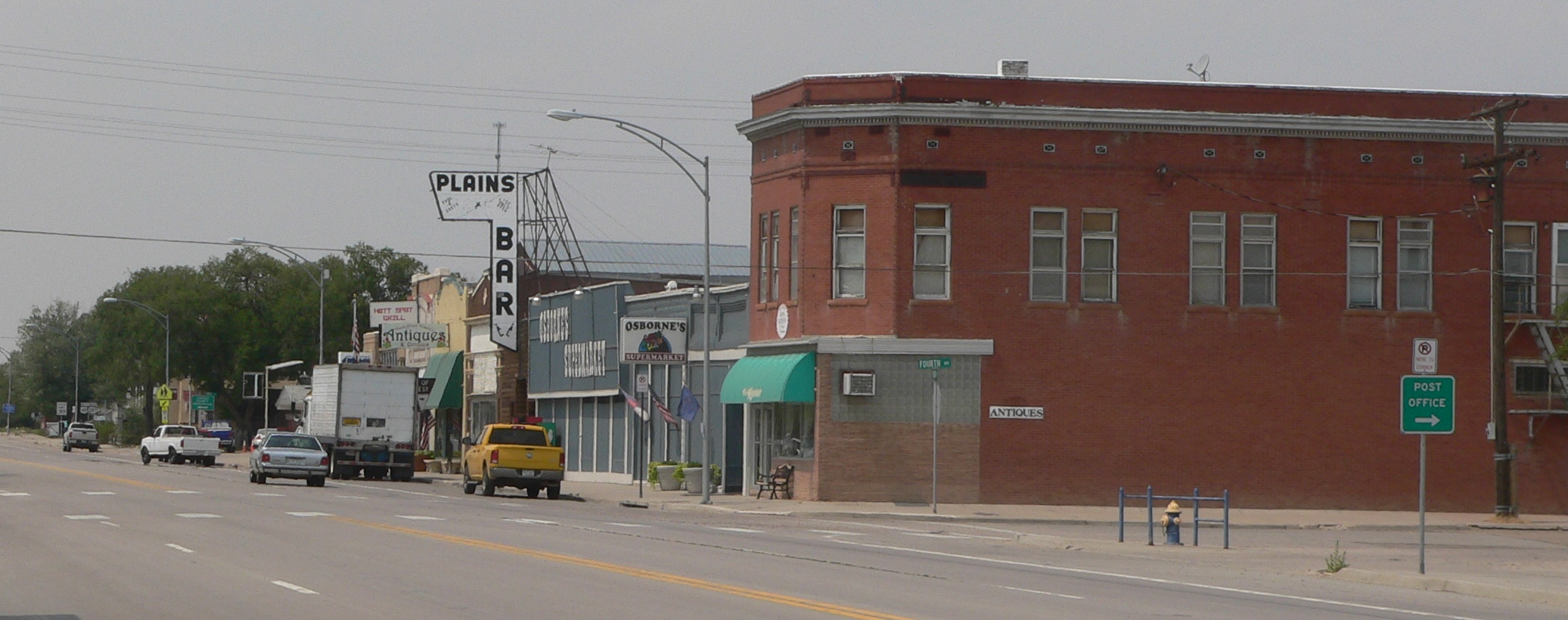
- Downtown Hugo, looking northwest along U.S. Highway 40 (2012)

- Location within Lincoln County and Colorado
- Coordinates: 39°8′1″N 103°28′5″W
- Country: United States
- State: Colorado
- County: Lincoln
- Incorporated: June 21, 1909

Area
  - Total: 0.91 sq mi (2.36 km^{2})
  - Land: 0.91 sq mi (2.36 km^{2})
  - Water: 0 sq mi (0.00 km^{2})
- Elevation: 5,040 ft (1,540 m)

Population (2020)
  - Total: 787
  - Density: 864/sq mi (333/km^{2})
- Time zone: UTC−7 (MST)
  - Summer (DST): UTC−6 (MDT)
- ZIP Code: 80821
- Area code: 719
- FIPS code: 08-37875
- GNIS ID: 195141
- Website: townhugo.com

Hugo (Spanish for "Hugh") is a statutory town in and the county seat of Lincoln County, Colorado, United States. The town population was 787 at the 2020 census.

== History ==
In about 1859 the town was developed as a cattle ranching community to supply miners with provisions. The town was also used as a local stage coach stop.

There are two stories as to how the town obtained its name. One version says the town was named by the Kansas Pacific Railroad builders after pioneer stage agent (Overland company), Hugo Richards. Richards later moved to Prescott, Arizona where he became town banker and businessman. Another story says the town was named for Richard Hugo who was a local settler. The town was founded in 1870, and incorporated in 1909.

In July 2016, the water supply for the town of Hugo was purportedly contaminated by THC, the main psychoactive component in cannabis. Subsequent testing found no THC in the water supply, and authorities believe the initial tests were false positives.

== Geography ==
According to the United States Census Bureau, the town has a total area of 1.0 square mile (2.6 km^{2}), all of which is land. Hugo's elevation is 5,039 ft.

=== Climate ===
According to the Köppen Climate Classification system, Hugo has a cold semi-arid climate, abbreviated "BSk" on climate maps.

Climate data for Hugo, Colorado, 1991–2020 normals, extremes 1897–2019
Month	Jan	Feb	Mar	Apr	May	Jun	Jul	Aug	Sep	Oct	Nov	Dec	Year
Record high °F (°C)	78 (26)	82 (28)	85 (29)	89 (32)	98 (37)	103 (39)	104 (40)	101 (38)	100 (38)	91 (33)	83 (28)	75 (24)	104 (40)
Mean maximum °F (°C)	67.3 (19.6)	69.1 (20.6)	76.2 (24.6)	82.5 (28.1)	89.6 (32.0)	95.5 (35.3)	99.1 (37.3)	97.1 (36.2)	93.0 (33.9)	86.5 (30.3)	75.1 (23.9)	66.6 (19.2)	98.7 (37.1)
Mean daily maximum °F (°C)	45.7 (7.6)	47.0 (8.3)	56.4 (13.6)	63.6 (17.6)	72.6 (22.6)	83.1 (28.4)	89.1 (31.7)	86.8 (30.4)	79.7 (26.5)	66.8 (19.3)	54.0 (12.2)	45.0 (7.2)	65.8 (18.8)
Daily mean °F (°C)	29.0 (−1.7)	30.8 (−0.7)	39.3 (4.1)	46.3 (7.9)	56.4 (13.6)	66.7 (19.3)	72.6 (22.6)	70.5 (21.4)	62.3 (16.8)	49.2 (9.6)	37.5 (3.1)	29.1 (−1.6)	49.1 (9.5)
Mean daily minimum °F (°C)	12.3 (−10.9)	14.5 (−9.7)	22.2 (−5.4)	29.1 (−1.6)	40.3 (4.6)	50.4 (10.2)	56.1 (13.4)	54.3 (12.4)	45.0 (7.2)	31.5 (−0.3)	21.0 (−6.1)	13.3 (−10.4)	32.5 (0.3)
Mean minimum °F (°C)	−6.4 (−21.3)	−0.7 (−18.2)	6.5 (−14.2)	17.0 (−8.3)	28.6 (−1.9)	40.1 (4.5)	49.6 (9.8)	46.7 (8.2)	31.6 (−0.2)	14.1 (−9.9)	1.7 (−16.8)	−4.1 (−20.1)	−13.0 (−25.0)
Record low °F (°C)	−28 (−33)	−22 (−30)	−13 (−25)	2 (−17)	21 (−6)	31 (−1)	43 (6)	37 (3)	24 (−4)	−5 (−21)	−17 (−27)	−28 (−33)	−28 (−33)
Average precipitation inches (mm)	0.16 (4.1)	0.33 (8.4)	0.65 (17)	1.24 (31)	2.02 (51)	2.52 (64)	3.14 (80)	2.61 (66)	1.08 (27)	1.02 (26)	0.26 (6.6)	0.32 (8.1)	15.35 (389.2)
Average snowfall inches (cm)	3.2 (8.1)	4.2 (11)	4.6 (12)	4.1 (10)	0.4 (1.0)	0.0 (0.0)	0.0 (0.0)	0.0 (0.0)	0.0 (0.0)	2.2 (5.6)	2.1 (5.3)	3.6 (9.1)	24.4 (62.1)
Average precipitation days (≥ 0.01 in)	2.0	2.3	3.1	5.0	6.9	6.9	7.5	7.4	4.1	3.6	2.0	1.7	52.5
Average snowy days (≥ 0.1 in)	1.9	2.1	1.8	1.7	0.2	0.0	0.0	0.0	0.0	0.6	1.5	1.8	11.6
Source 1: NOAA
Source 2: National Weather Service (mean maxima and minima 1991–2005)

== Demographics ==
Historical population
Census	Pop.	Note	%±
1880	140		—
1910	343		—
1920	838		144.3%
1930	712		−15.0%
1940	852		19.7%
1950	943		10.7%
1960	811		−14.0%
1970	759		−6.4%
1980	776		2.2%
1990	660		−14.9%
2000	885		34.1%
2010	730		−17.5%
2020	787		7.8%
U.S. Decennial Census

As of the census of 2000, there were 885 people, 353 households, and 230 families residing in the town. The population density was 917.3 inhabitants per square mile (354.2/km^{2}). There were 440 housing units at an average density of 456.0 per square mile (176.1/km^{2}). The racial makeup of the town was 96.38% White, 0.79% African American, 1.24% Native American, 0.45% from other races, and 1.13% from two or more races. Hispanic or Latino of any race were 3.84% of the population.

There were 353 households, out of which 31.4% had children under the age of 18 living with them, 52.1% were married couples living together, 11.0% had a female householder with no husband present, and 34.6% were non-families. 30.9% of all households were made up of individuals, and 13.6% had someone living alone who was 65 years of age or older. The average household size was 2.35 and the average family size was 2.94.

In the town, the population was spread out, with 25.2% under the age of 18, 7.3% from 18 to 24, 26.0% from 25 to 44, 23.7% from 45 to 64, and 17.7% who were 65 years of age or older. The median age was 39 years. For every 100 females, there were 85.5 males. For every 100 females age 18 and over, there were 81.9 males.

The median income for a household in the town was $30,259, and the median income for a family was $36,667. Males had a median income of $29,583 versus $20,536 for females. The per capita income for the town was $15,669. About 10.4% of families and 12.3% of the population were below the poverty line, including 14.2% of those under age 18 and 15.7% of those age 65 or over.

== Arts and culture ==
Hugo has the Eastern Trails Museum and Cultural Arts Center, the historic Hugo Kansas-Pacific/Union Pacific Roundhouse, the Union Pacific Train Depot Town Museum, and the historic Hedlund Museum House, the vintage swimming pool of which are all located in Hugo.

Hugo's public library is located in the Hugo municipal building.

== Parks and recreation ==
Hugo's municipal public park (Hines Park) features a vintage swimming pool which was constructed as a Works Project Administration facility in the 1930s and is designated as a historic site by the National Register of Historic Places. There is also a picnic area, playgrounds, a volleyball court as well as a basketball court. The municipal building has a racquetball court on its grounds. The Coulson Nature Trail is a 2.5-mile wildlife and nature hiking trail on the outskirts of town. Kinney Lake State Wildlife Area is 14 miles south of Hugo, and features a 10-acre lake for fishing and recreation as well as camping and hunting of deer, antelope, rabbit, coyote, waterfowl during the licensed season.

== Government ==
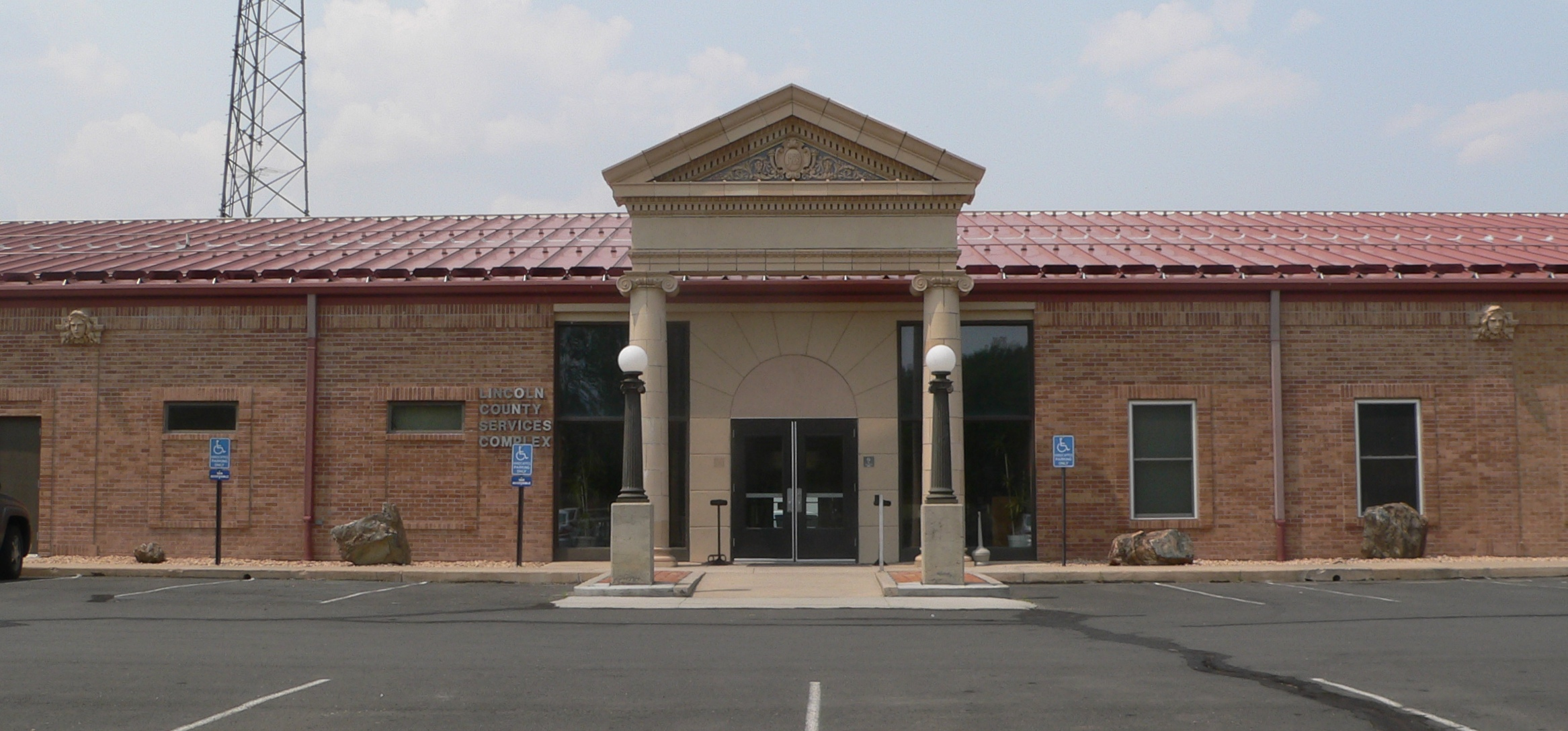
Lincoln County courthouse

Hugo is the county seat of Lincoln County, Colorado.

== Education ==
Hugo is served by the Genoa-Hugo School District No. C-113 and includes Genoa-Hugo Elementary School, Genoa-Hugo Middle School and Genoa-Hugo High School.

== Media ==
The Eastern Colorado Plainsman is the weekly newspaper serving Hugo and the surrounding communities.

Radio station KFII at 92.3 MHz FM is licensed to Hugo.

== Notable people ==
- Carl "Bev" Bledsoe - The longest serving Speaker of the Colorado State House of Representatives was a rancher from Hugo. Bledsoe, a Republican, was first elected to the state legislature in 1972 and served as Speaker from 1981 to 1991.

== See also ==
- List of municipalities in Colorado
