= National Register of Historic Places listings in Putnam County, Indiana =

Location of Putnam County in Indiana

This is a list of the National Register of Historic Places listings in Putnam County, Indiana.

This is intended to be a complete list of the properties and districts on the National Register of Historic Places in Putnam County, Indiana, United States. Latitude and longitude coordinates are provided for many National Register properties and districts; these locations may be seen together in a map.

There are 35 properties and districts listed on the National Register in the county. Another property was once listed but has been removed.

Properties and districts located in incorporated areas display the name of the municipality, while properties and districts in unincorporated areas display the name of their civil township. Properties and districts split between multiple jurisdictions display the names of all jurisdictions.

This National Park Service list is complete through NPS recent listings posted August 28, 2026.

== Current listings ==
	Name on the Register	Image	Date listed	Location	City or town	Description
1	Bainbridge Historic District		March 14, 2019 (#100003506)	Generally E. side of Washington St. from 123 S. to 405 N. & Main St. from 312 W. to 421 E. 39°45′41″N 86°48′43″W	Bainbridge	
2	Baker's Camp Covered Bridge	Baker's Camp Covered Bridge	May 21, 2024 (#100010368)	County Road 650 North over Big Walnut Creek. 39°44′57″N 86°46′31″W	Bainbridge	
3	The Boulders	The Boulders	September 16, 1993 (#93000948)	835 E. Washington St. 39°38′39″N 86°50′46″W	Greencastle	
4	Brick Chapel United Methodist Church	Brick Chapel United Methodist Church	September 28, 2003 (#03000973)	3547 N. U.S. Route 231 at Brick Chapel; 39°42′43″N 86°52′07″W	Monroe Township	
5	Samuel Brown House	Samuel Brown House	June 21, 2006 (#06000520)	1558 E. County Road 1100N, southwest of Roachdale; 39°49′N 86°49′W	Franklin Township	
6	Cloverdale Historic District	Cloverdale Historic District	May 30, 2018 (#100002496)	Generally bounded by Robert L. Weist Ave. and Lafayette, Logan, and Grant Sts. 39°30′46″N 86°47′39″W	Cloverdale	
7	Cornstalk Covered Bridge	Cornstalk Covered Bridge	May 21, 2024 (#100010369)	County Road 1350 North over Cornstalk Creek. 39°51′47″N 86°52′07″W	Roachdale vicinity	
8	Courthouse Square Historic District	Courthouse Square Historic District	March 1, 1984 (#84001237)	Roughly bounded by College Ave., Walnut, Market, and Franklin Sts. 39°38′38″N 86°51′52″W	Greencastle	
9	Delta Kappa Epsilon Fraternity House	Delta Kappa Epsilon Fraternity House	March 14, 1996 (#96000291)	620 Anderson St. 39°38′24″N 86°51′05″W	Greencastle	
10	Dick Huffman Covered Bridge	Dick Huffman Covered Bridge	May 21, 2024 (#100010370)	County Road 1050 South/Huffman Road over Big Walnut Creek. 39°30′30″N 86°57′27″W	Cloverdale vicinity	
11	East College of DePauw University	East College of DePauw University	September 25, 1975 (#75000047)	300 Simpson St. 39°38′24″N 86°51′42″W	Greencastle	
12	Dunbar Covered Bridge	Dunbar Covered Bridge	May 21, 2024 (#100010371)	County Road 25 North over Big Walnut Creek. 39°39′31″N 86°53′01″W	Greencastle	
13	Eastern Enlargement Historic District	Eastern Enlargement Historic District	June 23, 2011 (#11000387)	Roughly bounded by E. Franklin, Wood, Anderson, and College Sts. 39°38′30″N 86°51′22″W	Greencastle	
14	Edna Collings Covered Bridge		May 21, 2024 (#100010372)	County Road 450 North over Little Walnut Creek. 39°43′39″N 86°58′34″W	Clinton Falls vicinity	
15	Forest Hill Cemetery	Forest Hill Cemetery	September 14, 2015 (#15000598)	2181 S50W; 39°37′42″N 86°51′29″W	Greencastle Township	
16	Richard M. Hazelett House	Richard M. Hazelett House	April 19, 2006 (#06000304)	911 E. Washington St. 39°38′39″N 86°50′38″W	Greencastle	
17	Hillis-Long-Hultz House		August 31, 2026 (#100013348)	3363 E County Rd 800 N 39°46′42″N 86°47′05″W	Bainbridge	
18	Alfred Hirt House	Alfred Hirt House	March 14, 1991 (#91000274)	W. Walnut Street Rd., west of Greencastle; 39°38′42″N 86°52′27″W	Greencastle Township	
19	Houck Covered Bridge	Houck Covered Bridge	May 21, 2024 (#100010373)	County Road 550 South over Big Walnut Creek. 39°34′56″N 86°56′19″W	Greencastle vicinity	
20	Melville F. McHaffie Farm	Melville F. McHaffie Farm	December 22, 1983 (#83003600)	U.S. Route 40, southwest of Stilesville; 39°37′47″N 86°39′38″W	Jefferson Township	
21	McKim Observatory, DePauw University	McKim Observatory, DePauw University	December 22, 1978 (#78000051)	DePauw and Highbridge Aves. 39°38′44″N 86°51′09″W	Greencastle	
22	National Road over Deer Creek Historic District		May 23, 2018 (#100002497)	U.S. Route 40, W570S, Old U.S. Route 40, S25E, and Putnam County Bridges 187 and 237; 39°34′42″N 86°50′50″W	Warren Township	
23	F.P. Nelson House	F.P. Nelson House	July 18, 1983 (#83000092)	701 E. Seminary; 39°38′31″N 86°51′12″W	Greencastle	
24	Northwood Historic District	Northwood Historic District	August 25, 2011 (#11000388)	Roughly bounded by Shadowlawn, N. Arlington, E. Franklin, and Hillsdale Aves. 39°38′44″N 86°51′16″W	Greencastle	
25	James Edington Montgomery O'Hair House	James Edington Montgomery O'Hair House	January 13, 1992 (#91001909)	U.S. Route 231 ½ mile south of its junction with 500 North Rd. and north of Brick Chapel; 39°43′36″N 86°52′04″W	Monroe Township	
26	Oakalla Covered Bridge		May 21, 2024 (#100010374)	County Road 375 West over Big Walnut Creek. 39°37′35″N 86°55′01″W	Greencastle vicinity	
27	Old Greencastle Historic District	Old Greencastle Historic District	June 23, 2011 (#11000389)	Roughly bounded by W. Liberty, Market, W. Poplar, and W. Gillespie Sts. 39°38′44″N 86°52′03″W	Greencastle	
28	Pine Bluff Covered Bridge	Pine Bluff Covered Bridge	May 21, 2024 (#100010375)	County Road 900 North over Big Walnut Creek. 39°47′36″N 86°46′25″W	Bainbridge vicinity	
29	Putnam County Bridge No. 159	Putnam County Bridge No. 159	March 12, 1999 (#99000302)	County Road 650W over Big Walnut Creek at Reelsville; 39°33′17″N 86°57′51″W	Washington Township	
30	Putnamville Presbyterian Church	Putnamville Presbyterian Church	March 1, 1984 (#84001242)	State Road 243 at Putnamville; 39°34′25″N 86°51′54″W	Warren Township	
31	Roachdale Historic District		August 18, 2020 (#100003187)	Generally bounded by Washington, Main, Grove and 102 South to 506 North Indiana Sts. 39°51′00″N 86°47′58″W	Roachdale	
32	Rolling Stone Covered Bridge		May 21, 2024 (#100010376)	County Road 800 North over Big Walnut Creek. 39°46′29″N 86°47′03″W	Bainbridge vicinity	
33	Russellville Historic District		March 14, 2019 (#100003508)	Roughly bounded by Jesse Ave., Fordice, High & McCaw Sts. 39°51′24″N 86°59′06″W	Russellville	
34	Lycurgus Stoner House	Lycurgus Stoner House	September 12, 1985 (#85002134)	Manhattan Rd., southwest of Greencastle; 39°34′58″N 86°54′55″W	Washington Township	
35	William C. Van Arsdel House	William C. Van Arsdel House	September 20, 1984 (#84001246)	125 Wood St. 39°38′31″N 86°51′00″W	Greencastle	

== Former listing ==
	Name on the Register	Image	Date listed	Date removed	Location	City or town	Description
1	Appleyard	Appleyard	February 23, 1990 (#90000325)	August 18, 2014	Southern side of State Road 240, east of Greencastle; 39°38′19″N 86°49′08″W	Greencastle Township	

== See also ==
- List of National Historic Landmarks in Indiana
- National Register of Historic Places listings in Indiana
- Listings in neighboring counties: Clay, Hendricks, Montgomery, Morgan, Owen, Parke
- List of Indiana state historical markers in Putnam County
