= Ed Eiteljorge =

German baseball player (1871–1942)

- Pitcher
- Born: October 14, 1871; Berlin, German Empire
- Died: December 5, 1942 (aged 71); Greencastle, Indiana, U.S.
- Batted: Right Threw: Right

MLB debut
- May 2, 1890, for the Chicago Colts

Last MLB appearance
- August 27, 1891, for the Washington Statesmen

MLB statistics
- Win–loss record: 1–6
- Strikeouts: 24
- Earned run average: 6.68
- Stats at Baseball Reference

Teams
- Chicago Colts (1890); Washington Statesmen (1891)

Edward Henry Eiteljorge (October 14, 1871 – December 5, 1942) was a pitcher in Major League Baseball for parts of two seasons, one game with the Chicago Colts in 1890, and eight games with the Washington Statesmen in 1891.

He was the first of two individuals who have attended DePauw University to have become a major leaguer, along with Al Orth. Eiteljorge died in Greencastle, Indiana, at the age of 71, and is interred at Forest Hill Cemetery.
