= List of Indiana state historical markers in Putnam County =

Location of Putnam County in Indiana

This is a list of the Indiana state historical markers in Putnam County.

This is intended to be a complete list of the official state historical markers placed in Putnam County, Indiana, United States by the Indiana Historical Bureau. The locations of the historical markers and their latitude and longitude coordinates are included below when available, along with their names, years of placement, and topics as recorded by the Historical Bureau. There are 3 historical markers located in Putnam County.

== Historical markers ==
Marker title	Image	Year placed	Location	Topics
10 O'Clock Treaty Line		1966	Westbound side of U.S. Route 40, 0.5 miles east of the Clay County line 39°32′58.2″N 87°0′15″W	American Indian/Native American, Early Settlement and Exploration
Portland Mills		1972	Near the junction of County Roads 900W and 800N at the Calvert Shelter in the Portland Mills Picnic Area at Raccoon State Recreation Area; 39°46′46.6″N 87°0′38.4″W	Historic District, Neighborhoods, and Towns
Kappa Alpha Theta		2006	904 College Road in Greencastle; 39°38′10″N 86°51′45.6″W	Women, Education

== See also ==
- List of Indiana state historical markers
- National Register of Historic Places listings in Putnam County, Indiana
