= Bobby Mackey's Music World =

Nightclub in Wilder, Kentucky, US

Coordinates: 39°4′24″N 84°29′35″W

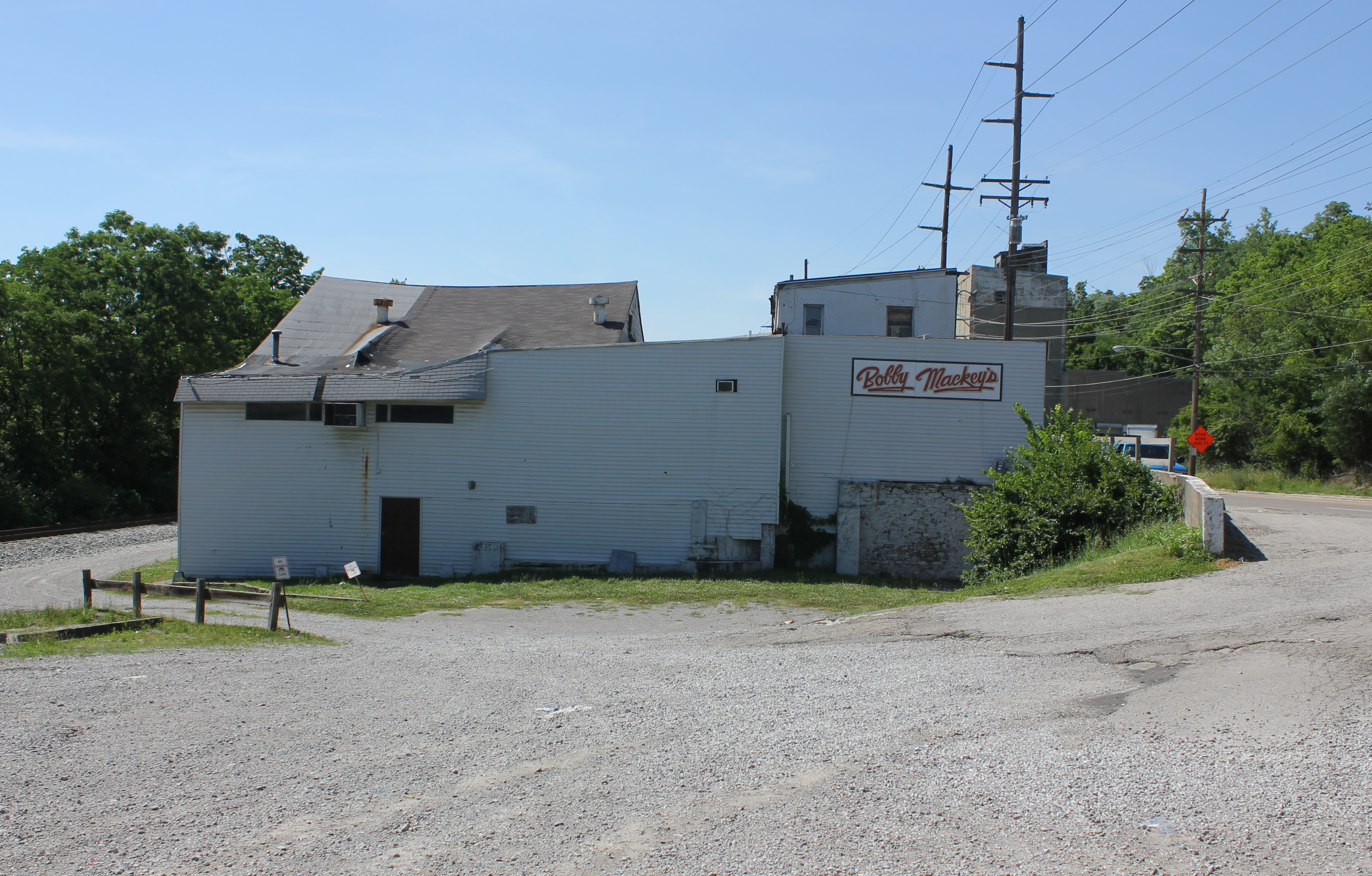
Bobby Mackey's Music World

Bobby Mackey's Music World was a nightclub and honky tonk located in Wilder, Kentucky, United States owned by country singer Bobby Mackey. Urban legends claim the nightclub is the site of hauntings, murders, and suicides; however, no credible evidence exists for such claims.

In March 2024, the nightclub closed and its owners announced plans to temporarily relocate to a site in Florence, Kentucky while the original site is demolished and a new facility is built there. The claimed "portal to hell" as well as a basement wall featuring water stains claimed to resemble human faces will be relocated to the new sites. On December 10, 2024, the building was demolished.

== Folklore ==
Promoted in popular culture as "the most haunted nightclub in America", Bobby Mackey's Music World has been associated with several urban legends and paranormal claims. Mackey has stated that the site was originally occupied as a slaughterhouse before a roadhouse was constructed there and was operated under various names including The Brisbane. Mackey purchased the property in 1978. Local legends describe the site as a "gateway to hell" and claim that it is haunted by several spirits including Pearl Bryan, whose body was found approximately 2.5 miles from the site in Fort Thomas, Kentucky. One legend claims that Bryan's murderers were Satanists who cursed the location and those involved in their prosecution. Another concerns a pregnant dancer named "Johanna" who has said to have died by suicide in the 1940s after her father murdered her lover, reportedly a singer at the club.

Investigation of property records, newspapers, and court files have found no evidence substantiating the legends associated with the site, and no connection between Bobby Mackey's Music World and the murder of Pearl Bryan has been established. Science writer Sharon A. Hill has noted that stories surrounding the nightclub have accumulated additional details through repeated retellings over several decades. Hill describes claims of supernatural activity and a "portal to hell" as unsubstantiated.

Haunting rumors and claims about Pearl Bryan are promoted in books such as Hell's Gate by Doug Hensley. Author Andrew Young speculates that such legends about Bryan are "a way to cope with the gruesome details of her death". According to the Campbell County Historical and Genealogical Society, the story of the murder of Pearl Bryan is continually exploited, and it is "highly unlikely" that her ghost haunts Bobby Mackey's Music World. Northern Kentucky Tribune reporter Ryan Clark investigated the rumors and took the $35 two-hour tour on two occasions, concluding, "there was nothing that happened on our tour that would indicate that Bobby Mackey's was haunted".

== Television shows ==
- On December 13, 1991, Bobby Mackey, his wife Janet, and caretaker Carl Lawson were guests on The Jerry Springer Show.
- On October 30, 1992, Mackey, his wife, Lawson and others were guests on Geraldo Rivera.
- On November 28, 1995, Bobby Mackey's Music World was featured in "The Headless Ghost", a segment of Haunted Lives: True Ghost Stories.
- On November 13, 2006, Bobby Mackey's Music World was featured in "Hauntings", an episode of the National Geographic Channel documentary show, "Is it Real?"
- On March 17, 2006, Bobby Mackey's Music World was featured on "Gateway to Hell" an episode of Discovery Channel's docudrama series A Haunting.
- On October 17, 2008, the premiere episode of the Travel Channel's series Ghost Adventures featured interviews with former caretaker Carl Lawson, and author Douglas Hensley. The network later released a 3-part web series called Return to Bobby Mackey's, and the nightclub was featured again on Ghost Adventures on October 1, 2010.
- On October 9, 2009, Bobby Mackey's Music World was featured in "Volume 2: "Dark Encounters", an episode of the Travel Channel's Most Terrifying Places in America.
- On November 16, 2011, Bobby Mackey's Music World was featured in "Distillery of Secrets", an episode of the SyFy program Ghost Hunters.
- On April 7, 2017, Bobby Mackey's Music World was featured in "The Ghosts and Demons of Bobby Mackey's, an episode of BuzzFeed Unsolved.
- On December 11, 2018, Bobby Mackey's Music World was featured in "Bobby Mackey's Music World", an episode of Destination America's Paranormal Lockdown.
- On May 10, 2019, Bobby Mackey's Music World was featured in "Bobby Mackey's Music World, " an episode of the Travel Channel's Portals to Hell.
- On October 7, 2022, Bobby Mackey's Music World was featured in "Roadhouse Reckoning", an episode of Travel Channel's Ghost Brothers: Lights Out.
- On July 13, 2023, Bobby Mackey's Music World was featured in "Bobby Mackey's Music World", episode 476 of the podcast Morbid.
