= Limedale, Indiana =

- Unincorporated community
- Location within Indiana Location within the United States
- Coordinates: 39°37′09″N 86°52′45″W
- Country: United States
- State: Indiana
- County: Putnam
- Township: Greencastle
- Elevation: 784 ft (239 m)
- Time zone: UTC-5 (Eastern (EST))
  - Summer (DST): UTC-4 (EDT)
- ZIP code: 46135
- Area code: 765
- GNIS feature ID: 437898

Limedale is an unincorporated community in Greencastle Township, Putnam County, in the U.S. state of Indiana.

== History ==
Limedale was laid out in 1864, and named for the lime quarries in the area. A post office called Limedale was established in 1873, and remained in operation until it was discontinued in 1909.
