= Murder of Pearl Bryan =

1896 killing in Kentucky

Pearl Bryan
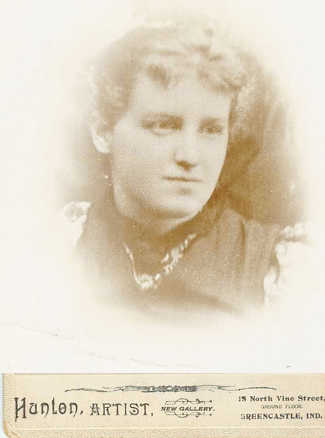
- Studio photograph of Bryan
- Born: c. 1874; Greencastle, Indiana, U.S.
- Died: January 31, 1896 (aged 22); Fort Thomas, Kentucky, U.S.
- Cause of death: Beheading
- Resting place: Forest Hill Cemetery; Greencastle, Indiana, U.S.
- Parent(s): Alexander S. and Susan Jane Bryan

Pearl Bryan (c. 1874–1896) was a 22-year-old pregnant American woman from Greencastle, Indiana who was found decapitated in Fort Thomas, Kentucky, in 1896. Her head was severed below the fifth vertebra. Due to the murder's gruesome nature, it achieved significant notoriety at the time. More recently, there have been claims that her ghost haunts Bobby Mackey's Music World located in Wilder, Kentucky.

Bryan had graduated from Greencastle High School, and was working as a Sunday school teacher at the time of her murder. She maintained a secret romantic relationship with a dental student of the Ohio College of Dental Surgery. Her lover and his roommate slipped cocaine into Bryan's drink while they were at a saloon in Cincinnati, Ohio, and proceeded to murder her later that night. Both students were convicted of first degree murder and hanged on the morning of March 20, 1897.

== Background ==
Pearl Bryan was born to Alexander S. Bryan and Susan Jane Bryan. Her father was a well-respected farmer in the community. She was a graduate of Greencastle High School. At the time of her murder, she had begun working as a Sunday school teacher. Bryan had left her home in Greencastle on January 28, 1896, under the pretense that she was visiting a friend in Indianapolis.

== Convictions ==
Bryan's body was found headless just behind what is now the YMCA in Fort Thomas, Kentucky on February 1, 1896, by a 17-year-old farm hand named Johnny Hewling. According to the presiding coroner, Bryan was found with multiple wounds across her back and her hands. He also indicated that she was decapitated while still alive. She was five months pregnant at the time of her death. Her body was identified by the tag in her custom-made shoes from Greencastle, Indiana. Pearl Bryan's headless body is buried in the family plot at Forest Hill Cemetery in Greencastle.

Scott Jackson, a dental student at the Ohio College of Dental Surgery, was soon arrested for the murder, and later implicated fellow student and roommate Alonzo M. Walling. During the trial, it was revealed that Jackson had carried on a secret romance with Bryan for several months prior to her murder. Allegedly, on January 31, 1896, Jackson and Walling slipped cocaine into Bryan's drink while they were at a saloon in nearby Cincinnati, Ohio and proceeded to murder her later that night. An analysis of Bryan's stomach showed that there was indeed cocaine present at the time of her death. In response to the location of Bryan's head, Jackson and Walling gave several answers, such as at the bottom of the Ohio River and in a sandbar in Dayton, Kentucky. The nearby Covington waterworks and parts of the Miami and Erie Canal were also drained in search of her head. However, investigations in these places turned up nothing. When interviewed in 1937, former detective Cal Crim of the Cincinnati Police Department theorized that Jackson and Walling burned her head in a furnace of the dental college that they attended. To this day, her head has never been located. Jackson's trial began April 21 and ended on May 14, 1896. Walling's trial began on May 26 and ended June 18 of the same year. Both were convicted of first degree murder and hanged on the morning of March 20, 1897 behind the Newport Campbell County Courthouse on York Street, just south of the Taylor-Southgate bridge. According to reports, both Jackson and Walling survived the initial drop that was supposed to break their necks and instead were strangled to death some minutes after. They were the last people hanged in Newport. The gallows located behind the courthouse were torn down following the execution.

The case was very popular nationally at the time, provoking citizens to take souvenirs from the crime scene (even branches), and buy Pearl Bryan "merchandise" from a store near the Newport Courthouse. One report says the trial was "theatrical". Local newspapers dubbed the case "the trial of the century". The actual double-hanging was urged to be done hastily due to the threat of a public lynching by friends and relatives of Bryan. Jim Reis, author, historian, and well-known reporter and columnist for the Kentucky Post, related in an article titled "Pieces of the Past" that even during a jail break at the Newport jail, the two men remained in their cell in fear of being lynched and were heavily protected.

== Popular culture ==
=== Music ===
In the 1910s and the 1920s, several folk songs surrounding the murder were created and popularized. The first to be recorded was by American country singer Vernon Dalhart in 1926. A year later, in 1927, folk singer Bradley Kincaid recorded a song called "Pearl Bryan" on the topic of the murder. Folk musicians Dick Burnett and Leonard Rutherford also recorded their own version in the same era.

In 2001, San Francisco-based folklore band The Crooked Jades recorded a song that focused on the murder.

=== Web and TV shows ===
An episode of Ghost Adventures explored Bryan's murder and claims of supernatural activity at Bobby Mackey's Music World. The Ghost Adventures crew claim an Ovilus device allowed them to contact the spirit of Scott Jackson and hear him confess to the murder (2008).

Bryan's murder is featured in the second episode of Most Terrifying Places in America (2009).

The case was featured in an episode of the PRX podcast Criminal, which focused on the many versions of a folk song about the murder (2015).

The BuzzFeed Unsolved episode called The Ghosts and Demons Of Bobby Mackey's reviewed part of Pearl's murder (2017).

Produced by Karga Seven Pictures, the third episode of Travel Channel's Believers entitled Hell's Honky-Tonk dealt with an allegedly haunted country music nightclub, mentioning a 19th-century story of a pregnant woman's dead body that was found headless. Due to anonymization, names were seemingly changed and the murder was supposed to have been taking place in Tennessee (2020).

Am episode on the YouTube channel Mystery Archives titled The Untold Story of the Demonic Bobby Mackey's mentions the history of Pearl and her murder (2023).

=== Books and artwork ===
An illustrated oracle card in the Haunts Oracle card deck features a grisly illustration of Bryan's headless ghost wandering in the Kentucky moonlight (2021). The deck was designed by Stacey Williams-Ng and features a variety of Southern ghosts, monsters and cryptids.

== See also ==
- List of solved missing person cases (pre-1950)
