= Greencastle Community School Corporation =

Community School Corporation in Indiana

Greencastle Community School Corporation is a school district headquartered in Greencastle, Indiana.

The district, within Putnam County, includes Greencastle, Greencastle Township, and Madison Township.

== History ==
The public school system was first established circa 1853.

DePauw University Professor John Baughman engaged in research on the history of GCSC. When the Constitution of Indiana was ratified in 1851, public officials in town started to organize a public school system. Legislation pass by the Indiana General Assembly provided funding for public school systems. On April 26, 1853, Greencastle Mayor John Hanna appointed three trustees to oversee the establishment of four primary schools in the respective wards and a high school.

In 1865 Greencastle residents petitioned the General Assembly to authorize issuing of bonds to construct separate school buildings.Hthe high school moved several times between these buildings unit 1899. According to Baughman, the high school was made into a four-year program in 1901.

The high school old was condemned as unsanitary and not large enough by the state in 1915. The Spring Street Greencastle High School was completed in September 1918 at a cost of $44,000. This served at the district high school until 1958 when the present day high school was constructed. The Spring Street building served as a middle school and was eventually sold in 1988, when is became a senior living center.

Jeff Gibboney, previously the superintendent of the Bloomfield School District of Bloomfield, Indiana, became the superintendent of Greencastle schools in 2020.

== Schools ==
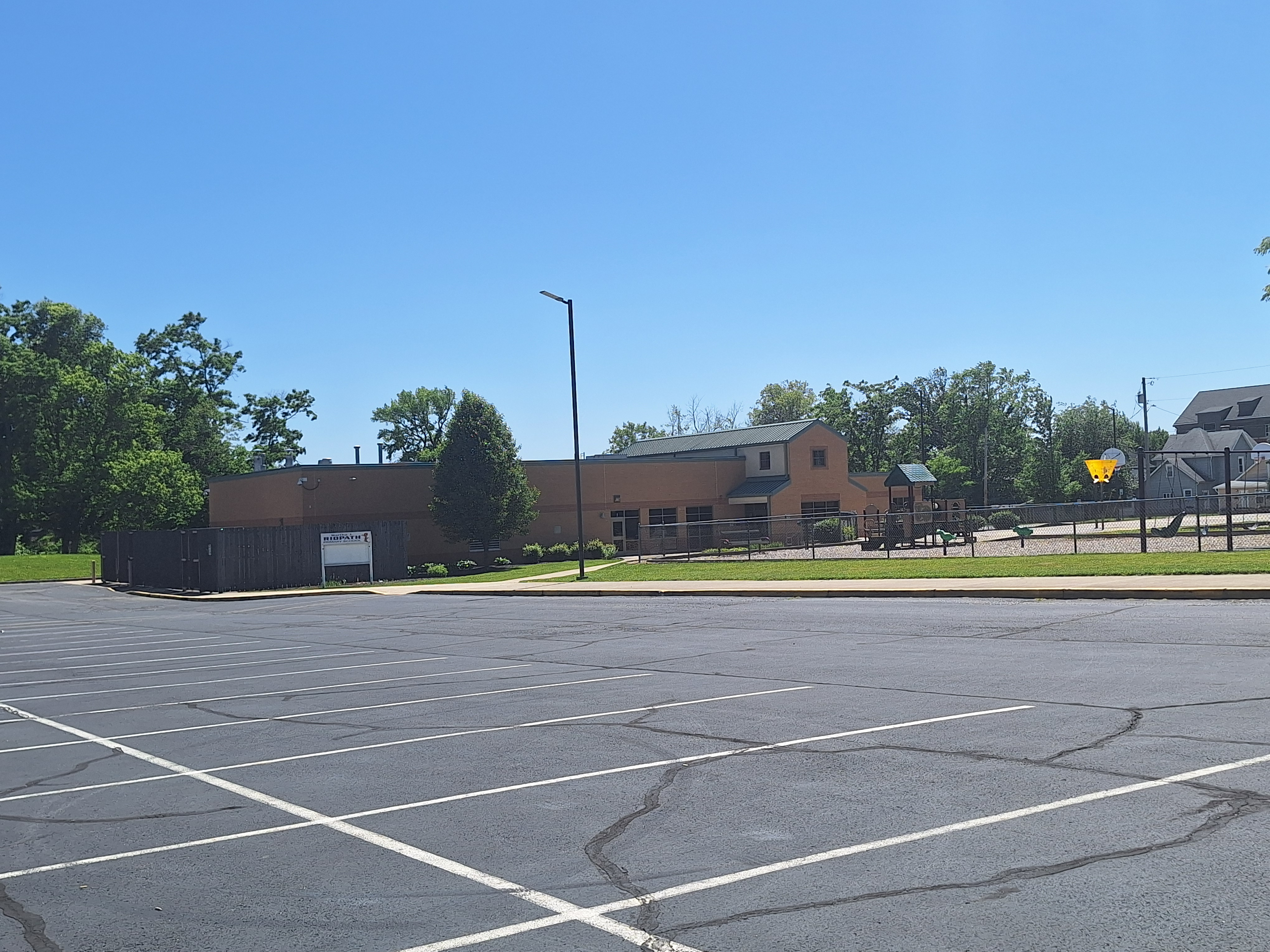
Martha J. Ridpath Primary School

- Greencastle High School (9–12)
- Greencastle Middle School (6–8)
- Tzouanakis Intermediate School (3–5)
- Deer Meadow Primary School (PK-2)
- Martha J. Ridpath Primary School (K-2)
