= James Edington Montgomery O'Hair House =

Historic house in Indiana, United States

- U.S. National Register of Historic Places
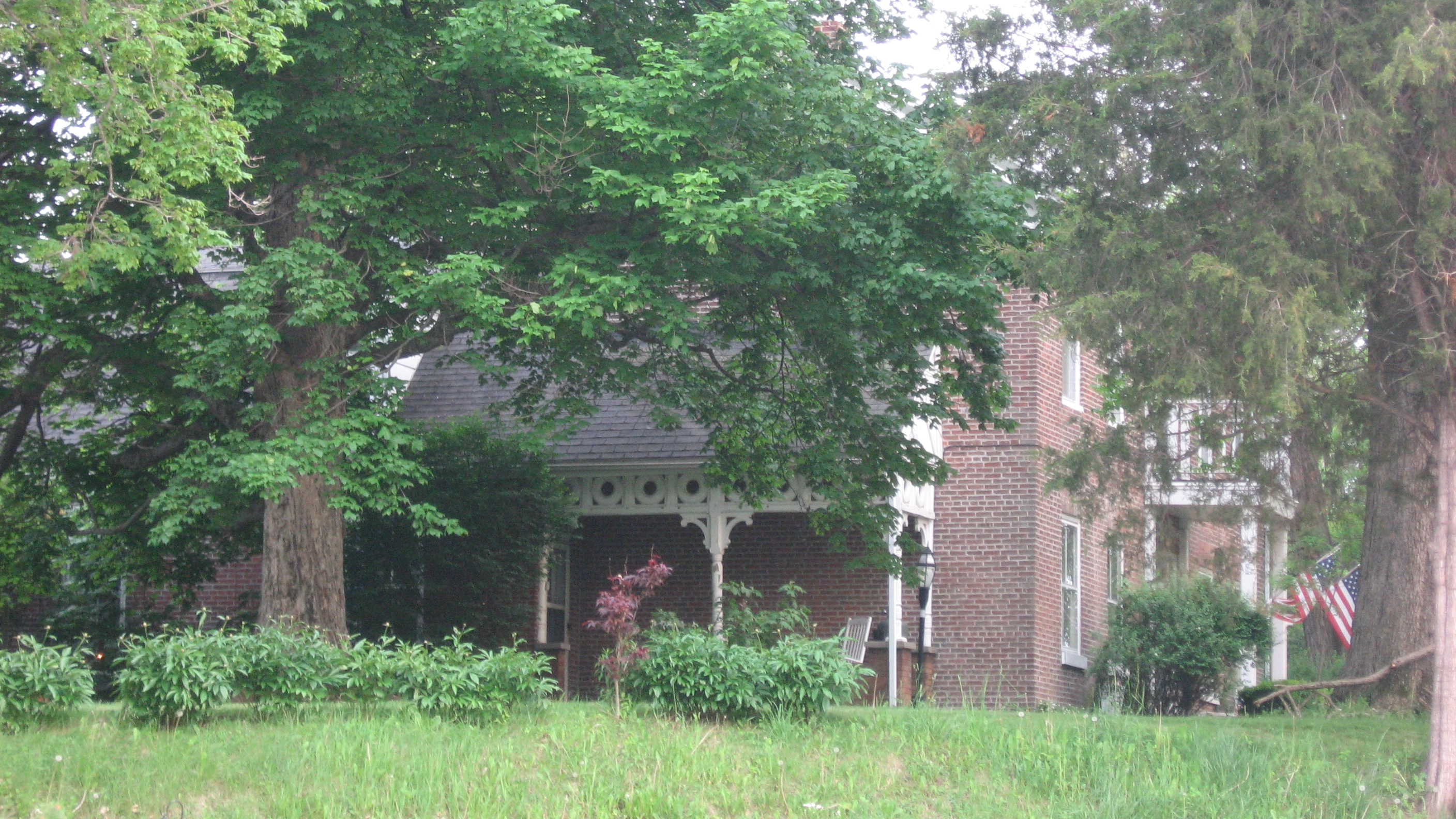
- James Edington Montgomery O'Hair House, May 2011

- Location within Indiana Location within the United States
- Location: U.S. Route 231 ½ mile south of its junction with 500 North Rd. and north of Brick Chapel in Monroe Township, Putnam County, Indiana
- Coordinates: 39°43′36″N 86°52′4″W
- Area: 1 acre (0.40 ha)
- Built: c. 1835, 1863, 1880
- Architectural style: Stick/eastlake, Federal, I-house
- NRHP reference No.: 91001909
- Added to NRHP: January 13, 1992

James Edington Montgomery O'Hair House, also known as the J.E.M. O'Hair House, is a historic home located in Monroe Township, Putnam County, Indiana. The original section was built about 1835, with an ell added in 1863. It is a two-story, Federal style brick I-house. It rests on a limestone foundation and has a side-gable roof. The interior was remodeled about 1880, and incorporates Eastlake movement design elements.

It was listed on the National Register of Historic Places in 1992.
