= Bobby Mackey =

American singer-songwriter

- Born: March 25, 1948 (age 76)
- Origin: Concord, Kentucky, U.S.
- Genres: Country
- Occupation: Singer
- Instrument(s): Vocals, guitar
- Years active: 1972–present
- Labels: Shaunita Records
- Website: bobbymackey.com

Robert Randall "Bobby" Mackey (born March 25, 1948) is a traditional country music singer whose career has spanned 40 years. His musical style can be described by his loyalty to Hank Williams, Merle Haggard, George Jones, Buck Owens, Conway Twitty, and Johnny Paycheck, and is the foundation for his musical success.

Mackey opened Bobby Mackey's Music World in September 1978 in Wilder, Kentucky, along the Licking River, next to the same railroad track that he worked in his youth. Bobby Mackey's has been featured on network television shows such as Ghost Hunters, Ghost Adventures, Most Terrifying Places in America, My Ghost Story, and A Haunting. USA Today quotes Zak Bagans of Ghost Adventures as saying Bobby Mackey's is "one of the 10 most haunted places in America."

== Singles ==
Year	Single	Chart Positions	
Year	Single	US Country	CAN Country
1982	"Pepsi Man"	57	26
