= Alexander Campbell Stevenson =

American politician

Alexander Campbell Stevenson (November 21, 1802 – January 2, 1889) was an American farmer, medical doctor, and politician.

Stevenson was born in Woodford County, Kentucky, and after briefly living in Indiana in 1821, he studied medicine at Transylvania University in Lexington, Kentucky. After earning his medical degree, Stevenson returned to Indiana for good in 1826, starting a practice in the city of Greencastle. While living in Greencastle, Stevenson campaigned for Indiana Asbury University to be located in the city; upon the success of his campaign in 1837, he served on the school's Board of Trustees for the next ten years and was its president for the first three.

Stevenson was also an active state politician who served in both the Indiana House of Representatives and the Indiana Senate. A member of the Whig Party, Stevenson represented Putnam County in the House in 1831–32 and 1844–45; during his second term, he served as Speaker of the House. He served in the Senate for three consecutive terms from 1839 to 1842. In addition, Stevenson made an unsuccessful campaign for Lieutenant Governor of Indiana, was a member of the Indiana Constitutional Convention of 1850–51, and declined a nomination to the U.S. Senate in the 1860s.

Following his political career, Stevenson began another career as an agriculturalist and stock breeder. In 1843, Stevenson established Appleyard, a farm near Greencastle. While Stevenson first bred merino sheep, he began breeding shorthorn cattle in 1845, and his work with this breed brought him significant success. In 1853, Stevenson visited England to inspect and buy shorthorn cattle for his farm; he was the first breeder to import cattle from England to Indiana. He was appointed to an unofficial State Board of Agriculture in 1847, and when the board became an official state body in 1851, he was one of its founding members. Stevenson served on the Indiana State Board of Agriculture until 1859, excepting 1855 and 1856, and was the board's president for three years. While on the board, Stevenson helped found the Indiana State Fair to promote agricultural development and collaboration. Stevenson also served as a leader for private breeding societies, as he was named president the Indiana Shorthorn Breeders Association after organizing the Indiana Shorthorn Breeders Convention in 1872. Later in the same year, he became president of the American Shorthorn Breeders Association and chairman of the National Swine Breeders Convention.

Stevenson married three women, the first two of whom he outlived, and had twelve children, among which he divided his farm prior to his death in 1889. After his death, he was inducted to the Indiana Hall of Fame for Agriculture at Purdue University.
