= Richard M. Hazelett House =

Historic house in Indiana, United States

- U.S. National Register of Historic Places
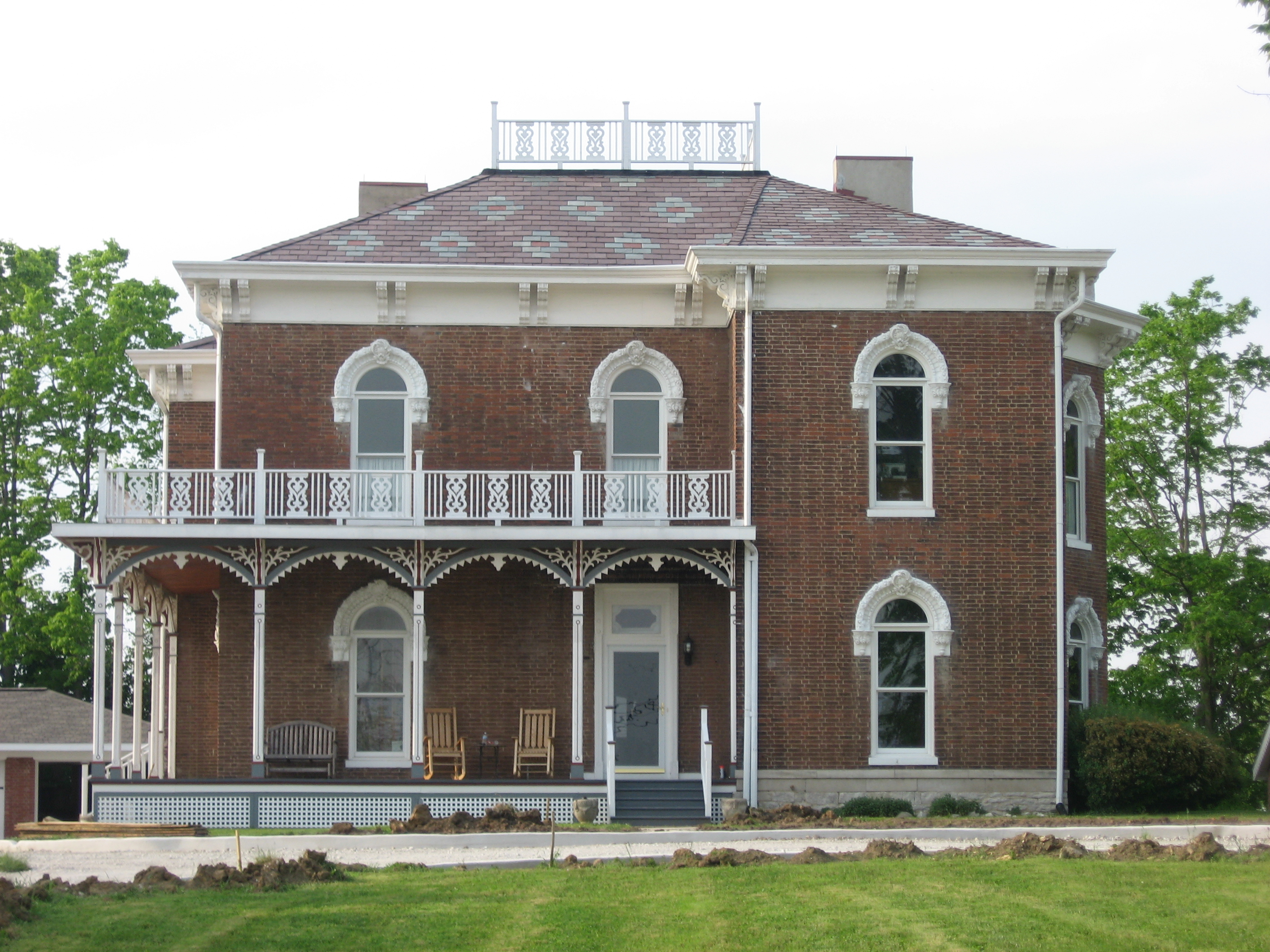
- Richard M. Hazelett House, May 2011

- Location within Indiana Location within the United States
- Location: 911 E. Washington St., Greencastle, Indiana
- Coordinates: 39°38′39″N 86°50′38″W
- Area: 1.4 acres (0.57 ha)
- Built: 1868
- Architect: Braman, Elisha
- Architectural style: Italianate
- NRHP reference No.: 06000304
- Added to NRHP: April 19, 2006

Richard M. Hazelett House, also known as Sunny Hill, is a historic home located at Greencastle, Indiana.

== Description ==
It was built in 1868, and is a two-story, Italianate style brick dwelling. It has a slate cross-hipped roof and sits on a raised stone foundation. The house features tall arched double hung windows with decorative caps and a wraparound verandah. Also on the property are the contributing combination smokehouse / privy, barn, and wrought iron fence.

It was listed on the National Register of Historic Places in 2006.
