= Appleyard (Greencastle, Indiana) =

- Formerly listed on the U.S. National Register of Historic Places
- U.S. Historic district
- Location within Indiana Location within the United States
- Nearest city: Greencastle, Indiana
- Architectural style: Greek Revival
- NRHP reference No.: 90000325

Significant dates
- Added to NRHP: February 23, 1990
- Removed from NRHP: August 18, 2014

Appleyard, also known as the Alexander C. Stevenson Farm, is a historic farm located on the south side of State Road 240 2 miles (3.2 km) east of Greencastle in Putnam County, Indiana. The farm was the home of Alexander Campbell Stevenson, an Indiana politician and agriculturalist. Stevenson founded the farm in 1843 while serving in the Indiana House of Representatives; he later served as speaker of the assembly. Stevenson bred shorthorn cattle and merino sheep on his farm using modern methods and became a prominent agricultural expert in Indiana. As a result of his efforts, Stevenson was appointed to Indiana's first State Board of Agriculture in 1851; during his tenure on the board, he helped establish the Indiana State Fair. Stevenson later served as president of the Indiana Shorthorn Breeders Association and the American Shorthorn Breeders Association.

The farm includes four contributing buildings; a Greek Revival farmhouse, a carriage house, a barn, and a well house.

The farm was listed on the National Register of Historic Places on February 23, 1990. It was also listed on the Indiana state historic register. It was removed from the National Register on August 18, 2014.
