= Delta Kappa Epsilon Fraternity House (Greencastle, Indiana) =

- U.S. National Register of Historic Places
- U.S. Historic district – Contributing property
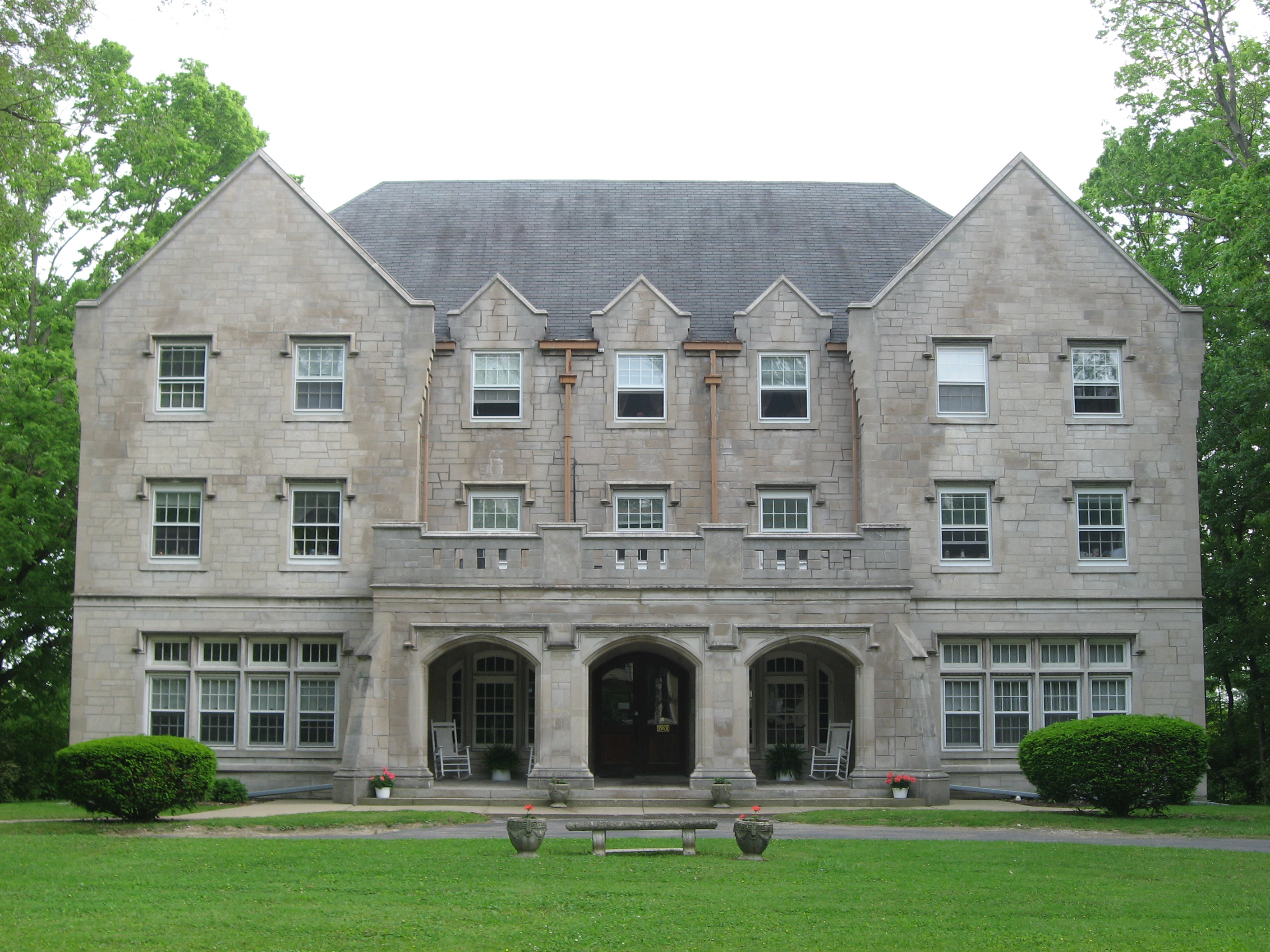
- Delta Kappa Epsilon Fraternity House, May 2011

- Location within Indiana Location within the United States
- Location: 620 Anderson St., Greencastle, Indiana
- Coordinates: 39°38′24″N 86°51′5″W
- Area: less than one acre
- Built: 1925
- Architect: Daggett, Robert Frost; Heath, Walter R.
- Architectural style: Tudor Revival
- NRHP reference No.: 96000291
- Added to NRHP: March 14, 1996

Delta Kappa Epsilon Fraternity House is a historic Delta Kappa Epsilon fraternity house located at Greencastle, Indiana. It was designed by noted Indiana architect Robert Frost Daggett and built in 1926.

It is a three-story, seven-bay, Tudor Revival style building faced in Indiana limestone. The building was originally H-shaped, but has been enlarged. It has a hipped roof and three-bay protruding porch on the first floor.

It was listed on the National Register of Historic Places in 1996. It is located in the Eastern Enlargement Historic District.

== See also ==
- North American fraternity and sorority housing
