= The Boulders (Greencastle, Indiana) =

Historic house in Indiana, United States

- U.S. National Register of Historic Places
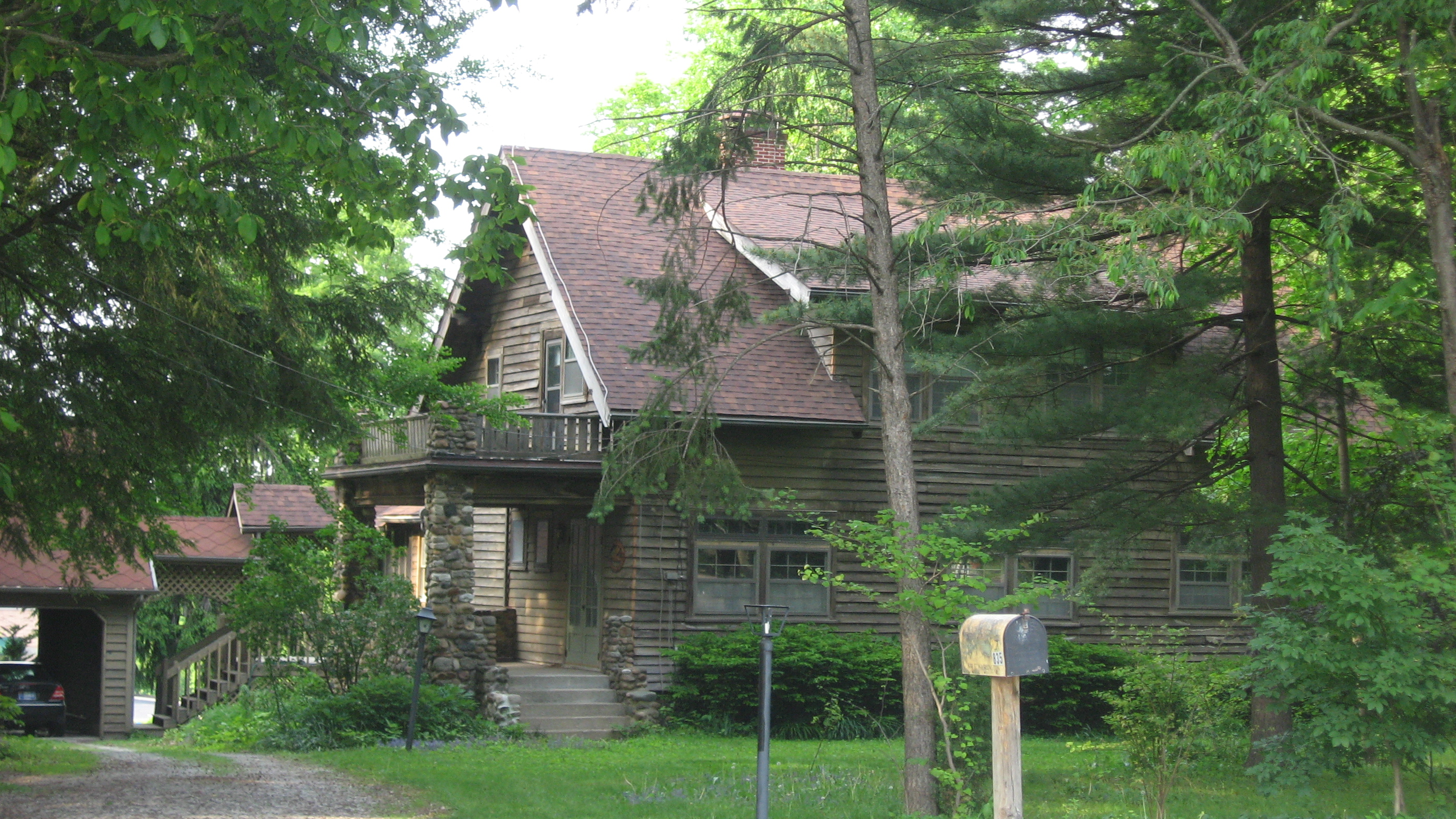
- The Boulders, May 2011

- Location within Indiana Location within the United States
- Location: 835 E. Washington St., Greencastle, Indiana
- Coordinates: 39°38′39″N 86°50′46″W
- Area: 2.4 acres (0.97 ha)
- Built: 1910
- Architect: Multiple
- Architectural style: Bungalow/craftsman
- NRHP reference No.: 93000948
- Added to NRHP: September 16, 1993

The Boulders, also known as the James Orville and Adelene Buston Cammack House, is a historic home located at Greencastle, Indiana. It was built in 1910, and is a 1 1/2-story, American Craftsman style wood frame bungalow. It is sheathed in stained cypress clapboards and sits on a concrete foundation with a veneer of glacial stones. Stones were also used to face the porch piers. Additions were made to the house in 1988–1989. Also on the property is the contributing landscape.

It was listed on the National Register of Historic Places in 1993.
