= Courthouse Square Historic District (Greencastle, Indiana) =

Historic district in Indiana, United States

- U.S. National Register of Historic Places
- U.S. Historic district
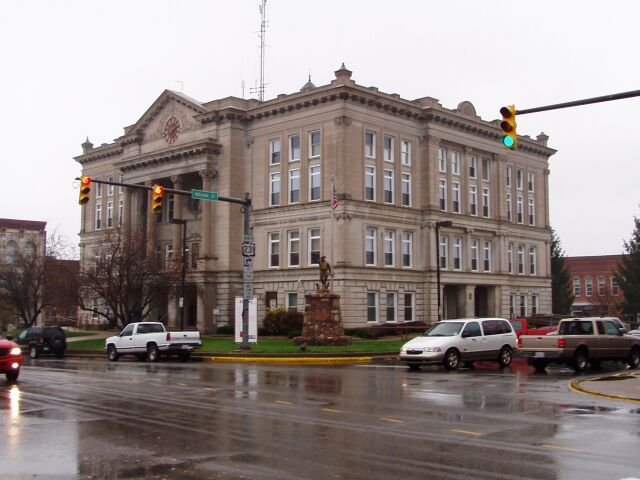

- Location within Indiana Location within the United States
- Location: Roughly bounded by College Ave, Walnut, Market, and Franklin Streets, Greencastle, Indiana
- Coordinates: 39°38′38″N 86°51′52″W
- Area: 16 acres (6.5 ha)
- Built: 1823
- Architect: Multiple
- Architectural style: Late 19th And 20th Century Revivals, Late Victorian
- NRHP reference No.: 84001237
- Added to NRHP: March 1, 1984

Courthouse Square Historic District, also known as Courthouse Square District, is a national historic district in Greencastle, Indiana, United States. In 1984, the historic district was added to the National Register of Historic Places.

The district includes seventy-six different contributing properties. Since the first years after Greencastle was platted in the early nineteenth century, the land included in the district has been the center of commerce and government for the area.

At its center is the Putnam County Courthouse: the current courthouse, built in 1905, is the fourth building to occupy the site. Other historic buildings include the Old National Bank building at 1 N Indiana Street.
