= Alfred Hirt House =

Historic house in Indiana, United States

- U.S. National Register of Historic Places
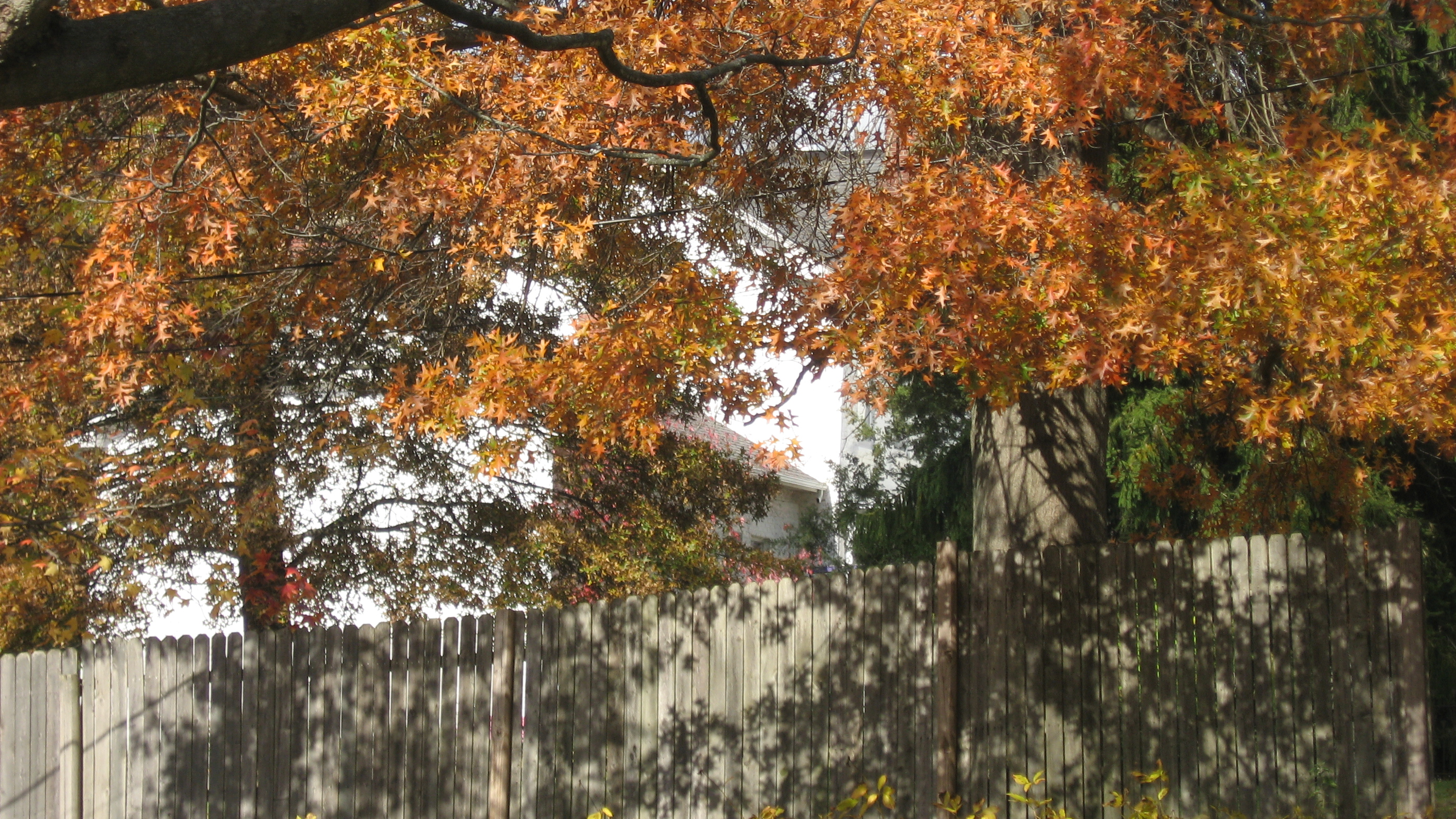
- Alfred Hirt House, October 2011

- Location within Indiana Location within the United States
- Location: W. Walnut Street Rd., west of Greencastle in Greencastle Township, Putnam County, Indiana
- Coordinates: 39°38′42″N 86°52′27″W
- Area: 4 acres (1.6 ha)
- Built: 1880; 146 years ago
- Architect: Muller, P. William
- Architectural style: Second Empire, Italianate
- NRHP reference No.: 91000274
- Added to NRHP: March 14, 1991

Alfred Hirt House is a historic home located in Greencastle Township, Putnam County, Indiana. It was built in 1880, and is a two-story, brick dwelling with Second Empire and Italianate style design elements. It consists of a main block with flanking gabled extensions and a one-story wing. The house features a corner tower with a mansard roof and one-bay decorative front porch. Also on the property is a contributing carriage house.

It was listed on the National Register of Historic Places in 1991.
