= Forest Hill Cemetery (Greencastle, Indiana) =

Cemetery in Greencastle Township, Putnam County, Indiana, U.S.

- U.S. National Register of Historic Places
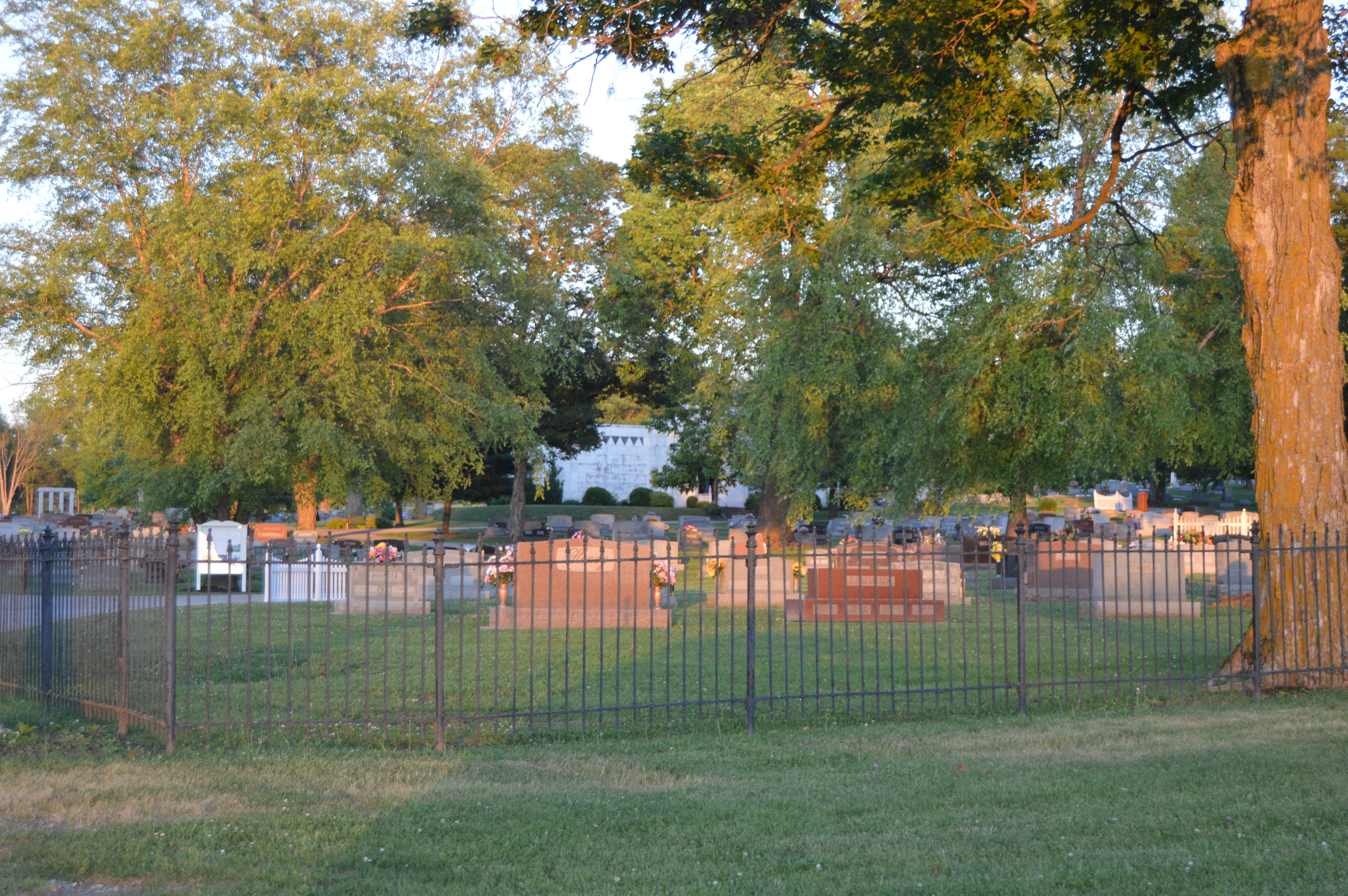
- Roadside view

- Location within Indiana Location within the United States
- Location: 2181 S50W, Greencastle Township, Putnam County, Indiana
- Coordinates: 39°37′41″N 86°51′31″W
- Area: 27 acres (11 ha)
- Built: 1865
- Architect: Tinsley, William; Jones, Thomas Dow
- Architectural style: Gothic Revival, Art Deco
- NRHP reference No.: 15000598
- Added to NRHP: September 14, 2015

Forest Hill Cemetery is a historic cemetery located in Greencastle Township, Putnam County, Indiana. It was established in 1865, and is a 133-acre city cemetery for Greencastle, Indiana. Notable features include the Forest Hill Abbey (1931), four family crypts (c. 1880), the Soldier's Monument (1870), DAR Monument (1915), and the cemetery layout and soldier's section.

It was listed on the National Register of Historic Places in 2015.

== Notable interments ==
- Thomas Bowman, Methodist Episcopal bishop
- Albertus Theodore Briggs (1862–1937), Methodist Episcopal minister
- Pearl Bryan (c. 1874–1896), murder victim
- Ed Eiteljorge (1871–1942), American baseball player
- Courtland C. Gillen (1880–1954), U.S. Representative from Indiana, judge and lawyer
- John Hanna (1827–1882), U.S. Representative and U.S. Attorney from Indiana, mayor of Greencastle
- Courtland C. Matson (1841–1915), U.S. Representative from Indiana
- Finis McLean (1806–1881), U.S. Representative from Kentucky
- Cyrus Nutt (1814–1875), president of Indiana University
- John Clark Ridpath (1840–1900), author and educator
