= Brick Chapel, Indiana =

- Unincorporated community
- Location within Indiana Location within the United States
- Coordinates: 39°42′42″N 86°52′09″W
- Country: United States
- State: Indiana
- County: Putnam
- Township: Monroe
- Elevation: 830 ft (250 m)
- Time zone: UTC-5 (Eastern (EST))
  - Summer (DST): UTC-4 (EDT)
- ZIP code: 46135
- Area code: 765
- GNIS feature ID: 449622

Brick Chapel is an unincorporated community in Monroe Township, Putnam County, in the U.S. state of Indiana.

== History ==
A post office called Brick Chapel was established in 1873, and was discontinued in 1905. The community took its name from the nearby Brick Chapel church.
