= F.P. Nelson House =

Historic house in Indiana, United States

- U.S. National Register of Historic Places
- U.S. Historic district – Contributing property
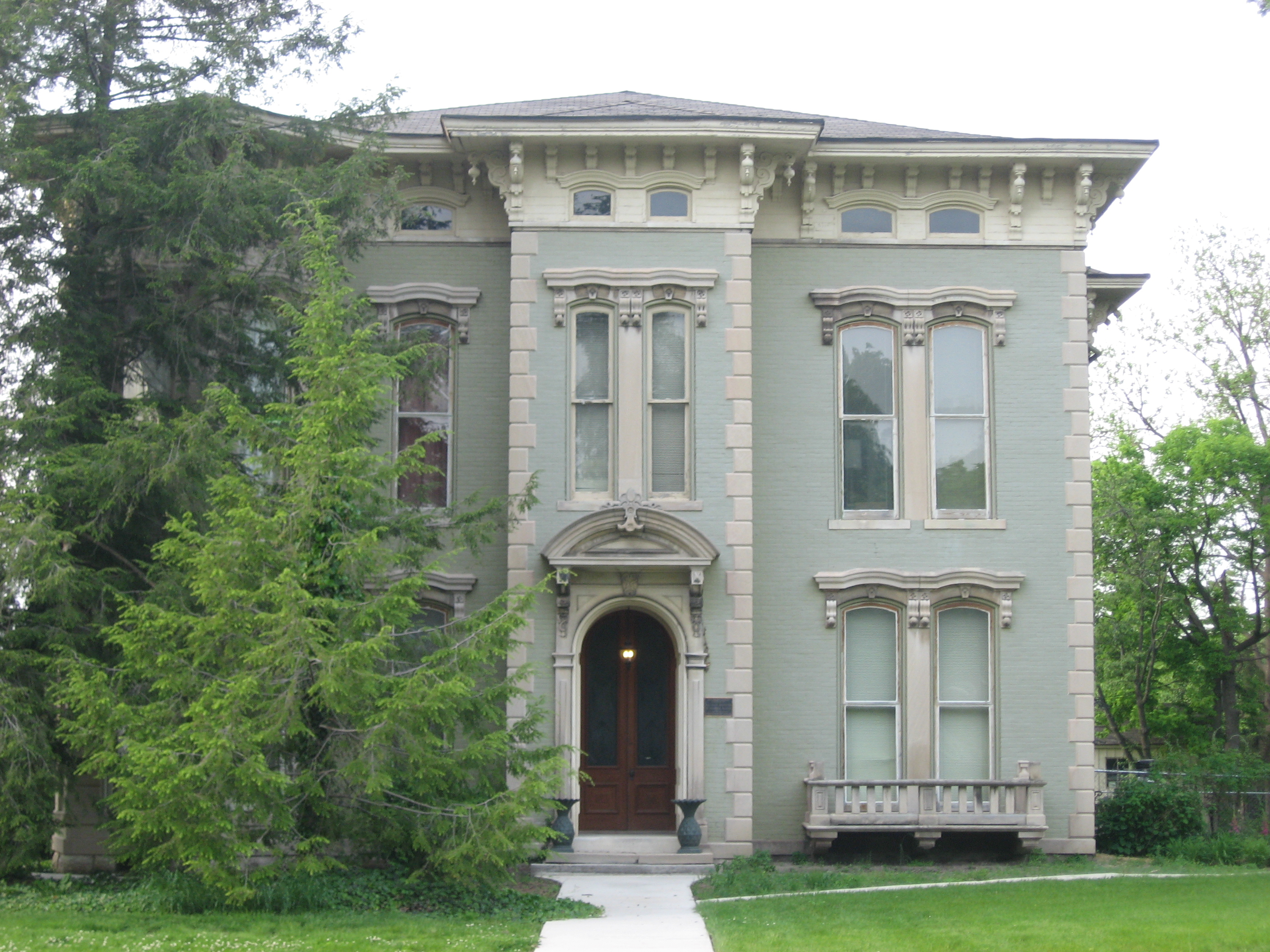
- F.P. Nelson House, May 2011

- Location within Indiana Location within the United States
- Location: 701 E. Seminary, Greencastle, Indiana
- Coordinates: 39°38′31″N 86°51′37″W
- Area: less than one acre
- Built: 1871-1875
- Architectural style: Italianate
- NRHP reference No.: 83000092
- Added to NRHP: July 18, 1983

F.P. Nelson House, also known as The Towers, is a historic home located at Greencastle, Indiana. It was built between 1871 and 1875, and is a large two-story, Italianate style brick dwelling. It has a low hipped roof and sits on a stone foundation. The house features segmental arched openings, a projecting entrance bay, and two-story polygonal bay.

It was listed on the National Register of Historic Places in 1983. It is located in the Eastern Enlargement Historic District.
