= Lycurgus Stoner House =

Historic house in Indiana, United States

- U.S. National Register of Historic Places
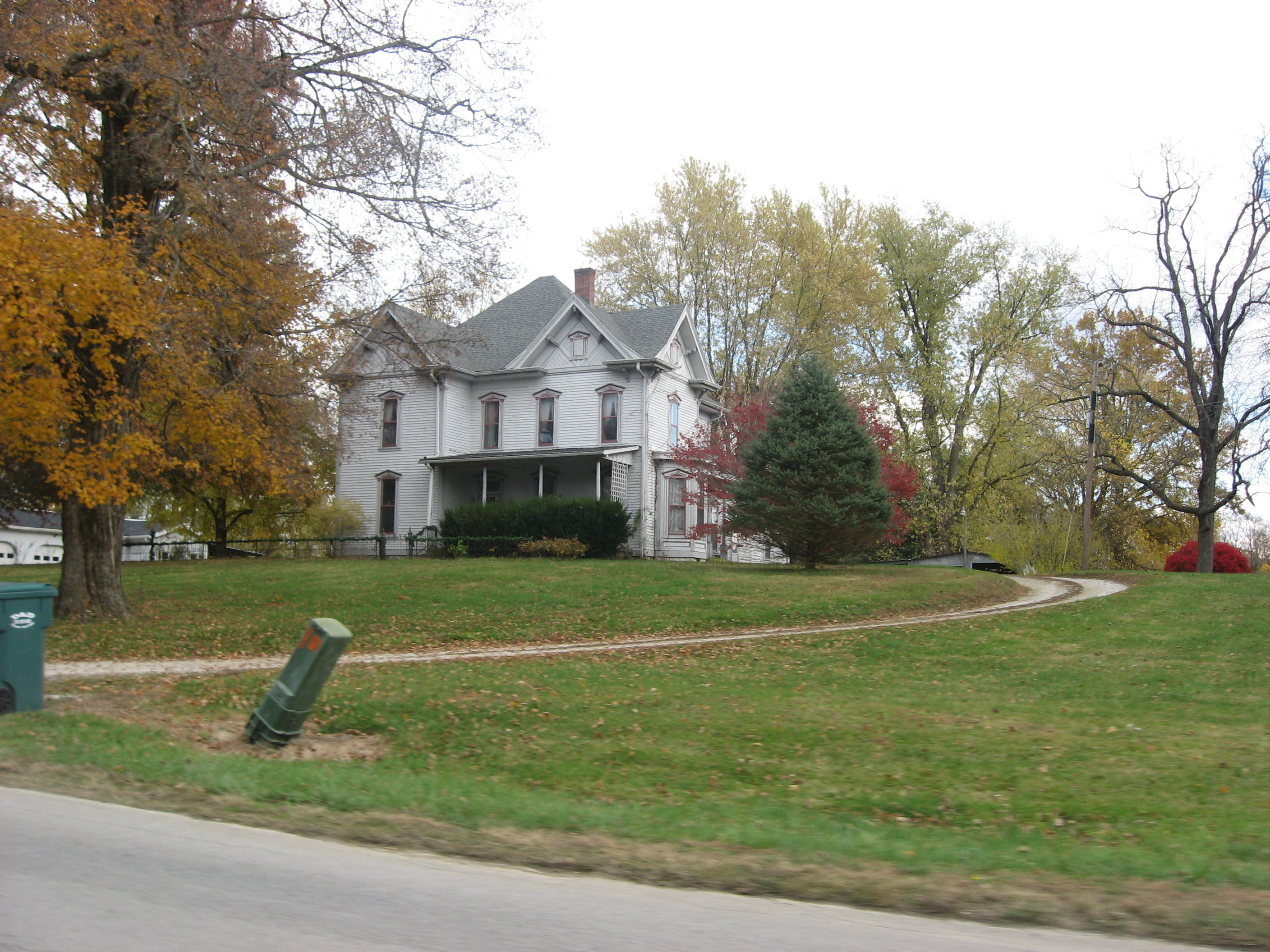
- Lycurgus Stoner House, October 2011

- Location within Indiana Location within the United States
- Location: Manhattan Rd., southwest of Greencastle in Washington Township, Putnam County, Indiana
- Coordinates: 39°35′2″N 86°54′50″W
- Area: 1 acre (0.40 ha)
- Built: 1883-1884
- Architectural style: Stick/eastlake, Italianate
- NRHP reference No.: 85002134
- Added to NRHP: September 12, 1985

Lycurgus Stoner House, also known as the Edna Brown House, is a historic home located in Washington Township, Putnam County, Indiana. It was built in 1883–1884, and is large 2 1/2-story, vernacular frame dwelling with Italianate and Eastlake movement design elements. It features a hipped roof with gables and projecting bay.

It was listed on the National Register of Historic Places in 1985.
