= McKim Observatory =

Observatory in Indiana, United States

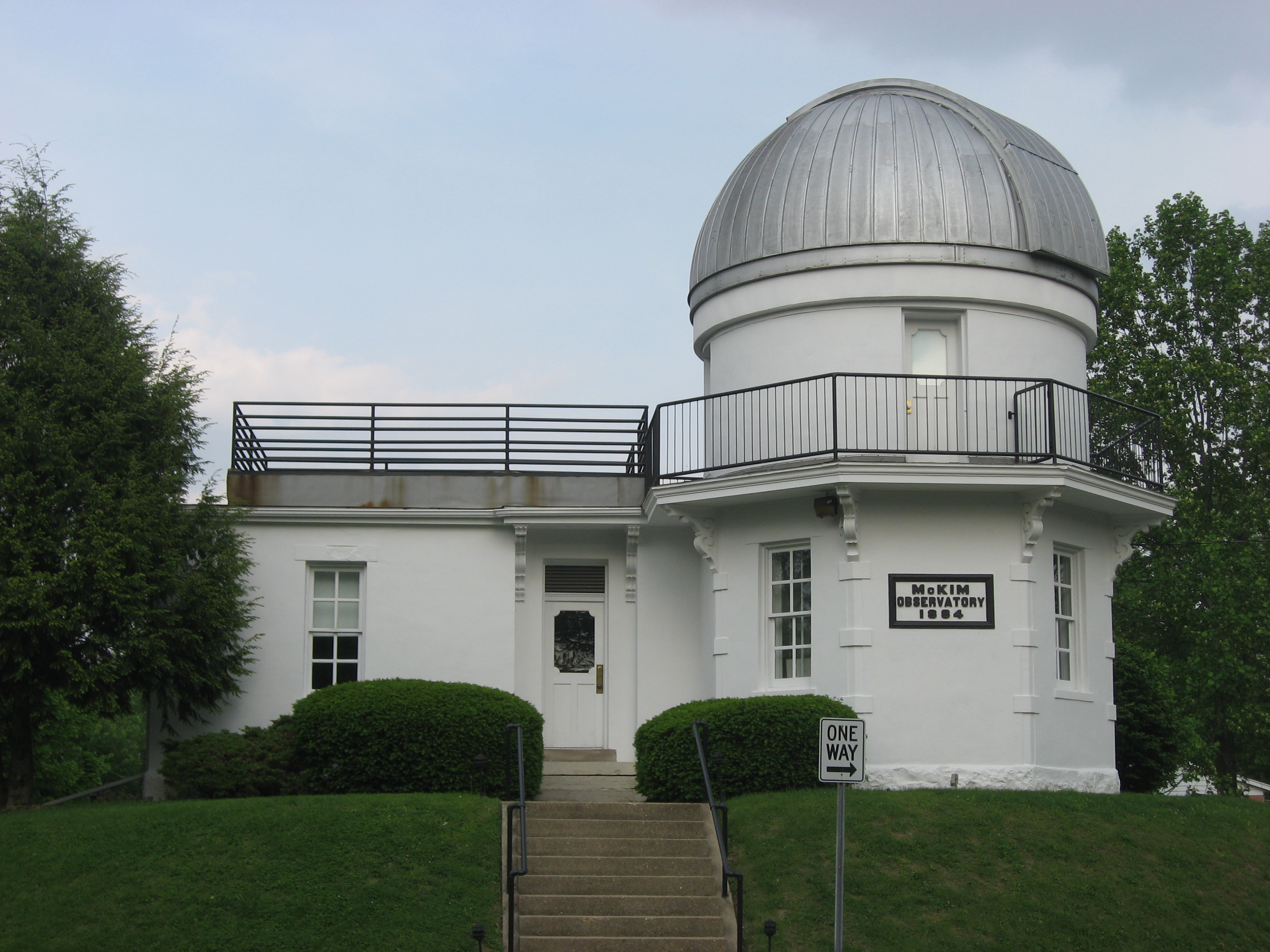
- Named after: Robert McKim
- Organization: DePauw University
- Location: Greencastle, Indiana
- Coordinates: 39°38′44″N 86°51′08″W
- Altitude: 259.08 m (850.0 ft)
- Website: www.depauw.edu/academics/departments-programs/physics-astronomy/mckim-observatory/

Telescopes
- Warner & Swasey-Alvan Clark & Sons Refracting Telescope: 0.242-meter /9.53-inch
- Related media on Commons

- McKim Observatory, DePauw University
- U.S. National Register of Historic Places
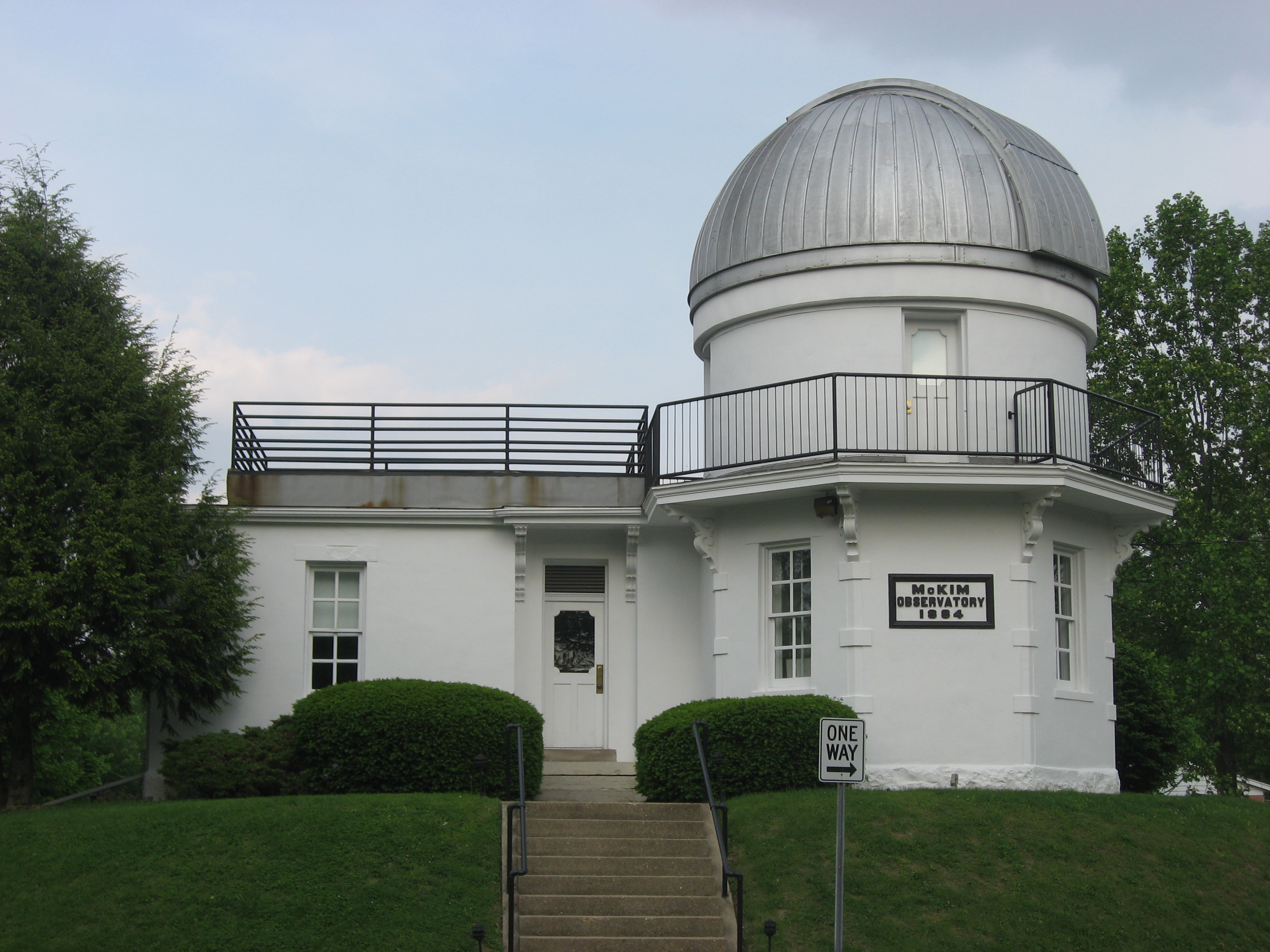
- Front of the observatory

- Location within Indiana Location within the United States
- Location: DePauw and Highbridge Aves., Greencastle, Indiana
- Coordinates: 39°38′44″N 86°51′9″W
- Area: less than one acre
- Built: 1884
- Architect: Marshall, Joseph
- NRHP reference No.: 78000051
- Added to NRHP: December 22, 1978

McKim Observatory is an astronomical observatory owned and operated by DePauw University. Built in 1884, it is located in Greencastle, Indiana, United States.

It was listed on the National Register of Historic Places in 1978.

== Donor ==
The observatory is named after Robert McKim, who presented to the observatory a complete astronomical outfit at a cost of over $10,000.

McKim was born in County Tyrone, Ireland, on May 24, 1816, and died in Madison, Indiana, May 9, 1887. After completing his apprenticeship as a stonemason in Ireland, he emigrated to the United States, worked for a time in Philadelphia, and moved to Madison, Indiana, in 1837. In 1855, he left stone masonry and established himself in the coal business. Income from investments in real estate enabled him to make investments in manufacturing enterprises which did well.

McKim was always a lover of astronomical studies, and, after his investment income was sufficient, he purchased one of the best telescopes in the United States for a private observatory adjoining his residence. Besides De Pauw, public charities and other institutions of learning also benefited by his bequests.

== See also ==
- List of observatories
