= William C. Van Arsdel House =

Historic house in Indiana, United States

- U.S. National Register of Historic Places
- U.S. Historic district – Contributing property
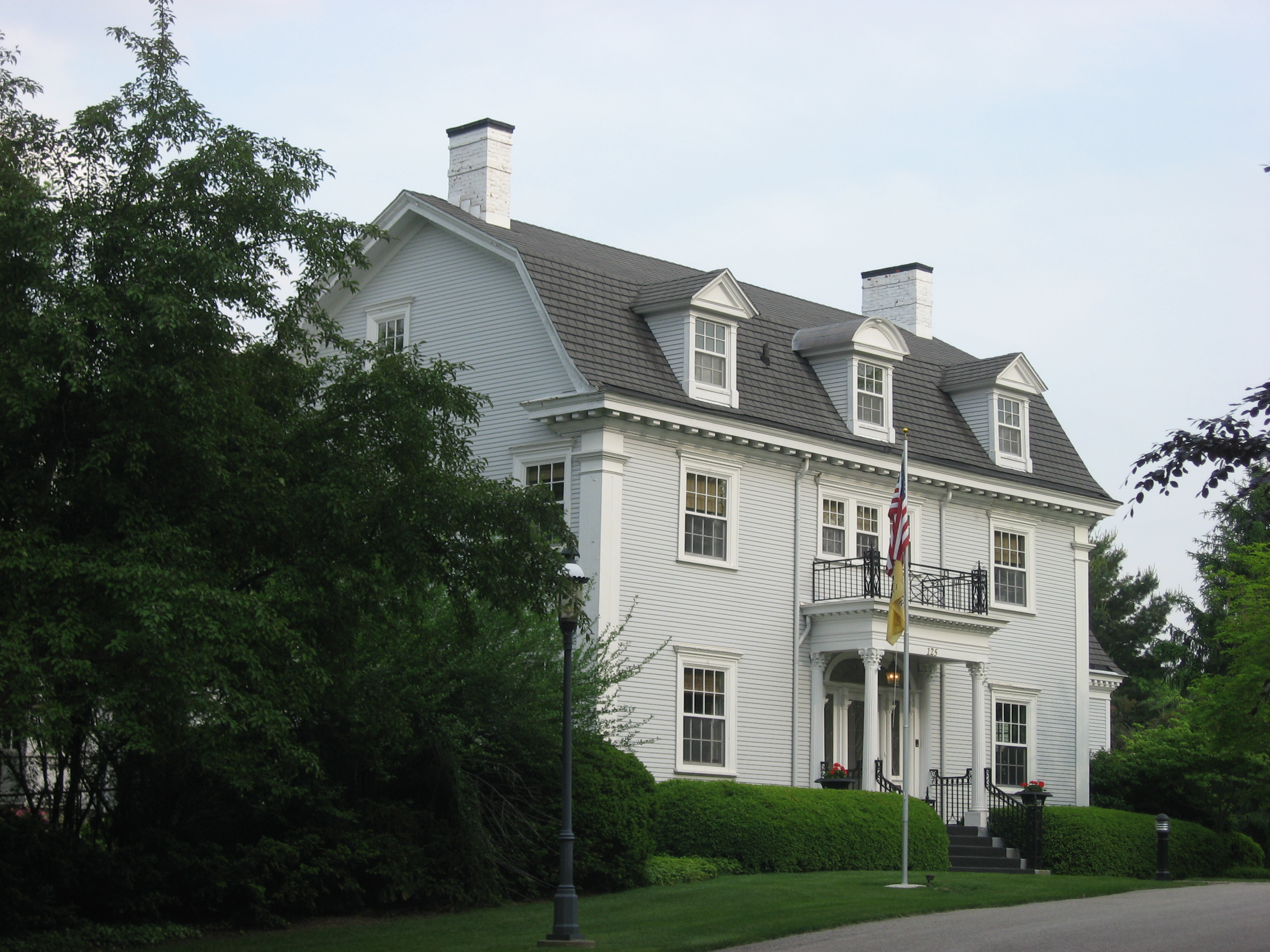
- William C. Van Arsdel House, May 2011

- Location within Indiana Location within the United States
- Location: 125 Wood St., Greencastle, Indiana
- Coordinates: 39°38′31″N 86°51′0″W
- Area: 2.3 acres (0.93 ha)
- Built: 1907
- Architect: Foltz & Parker
- Architectural style: Colonial Revival
- NRHP reference No.: 84001246
- Added to NRHP: September 20, 1984

William C. Van Arsdel House, also known as The Elms, is a historic home located at Greencastle, Indiana. It was built in 1907, and is a 2 1/2-story, Colonial Revival style frame dwelling. A rear addition was constructed in 1928. It has a gambrel roof with three dormers. The house features a balconied entrance portico with Corinthian order columns and corner pilasters.

It was listed on the National Register of Historic Places in 1984. It is located in the Eastern Enlargement Historic District.
