= Monroe Township, Putnam County, Indiana =

Monroe Township
- Township
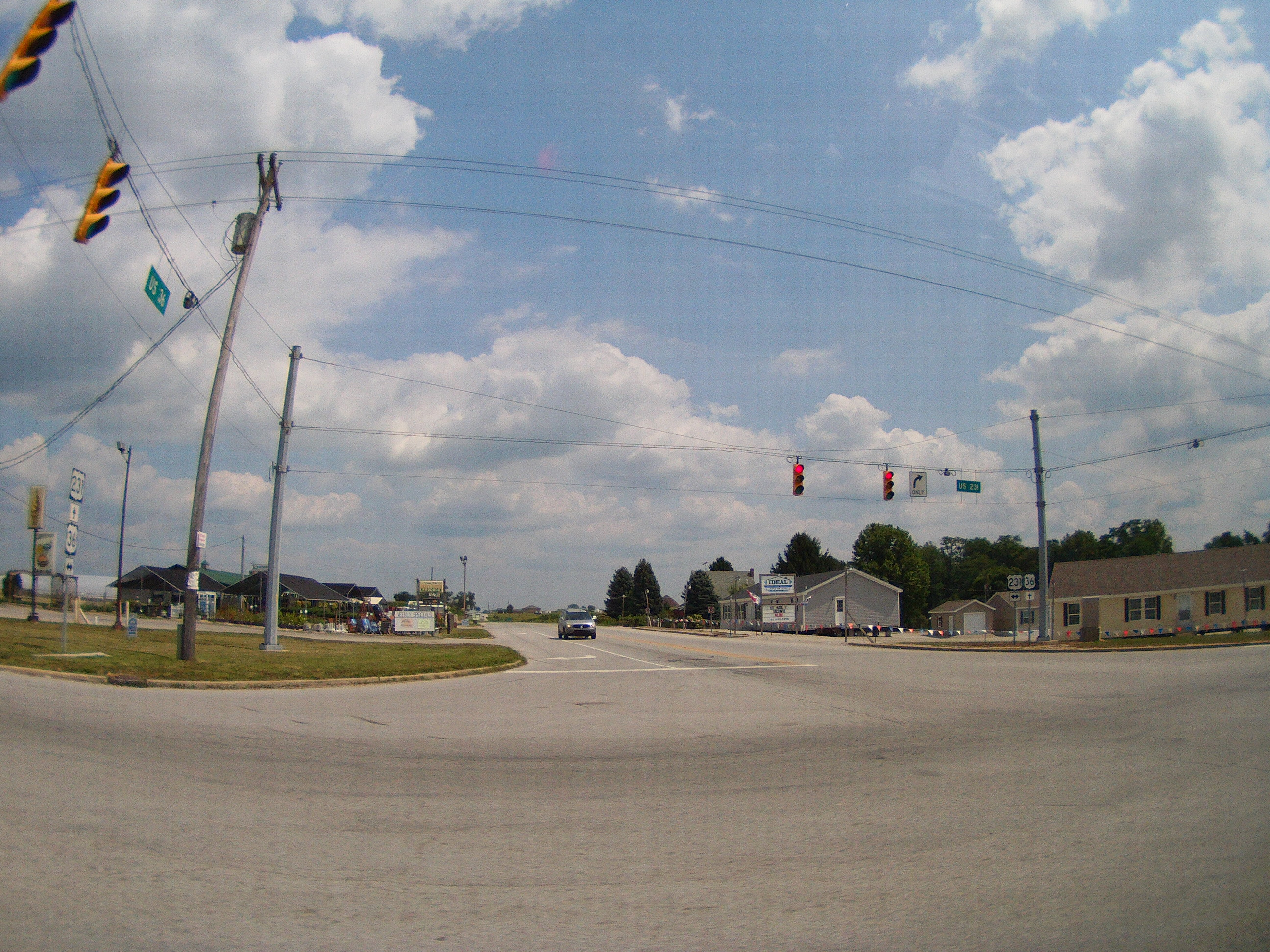
- Intersection of U.S. 231 and U.S. 36 in Monroe Township

- Coordinates: 39°43′20″N 86°50′33″W
- Country: United States
- State: Indiana
- County: Putnam

Government
  - Type: Indiana township

Area
  - Total: 34.57 sq mi (89.5 km^{2})
  - Land: 34.57 sq mi (89.5 km^{2})
  - Water: 0 sq mi (0 km^{2})
- Elevation: 902 ft (275 m)

Population (2020)
  - Total: 1,494
  - Density: 43.22/sq mi (16.69/km^{2})
- Time zone: UTC-5 (Eastern (EST))
  - Summer (DST): UTC-4 (EDT)
- Area code: 765
- FIPS code: 18-50454
- GNIS feature ID: 453646

Monroe Township is one of thirteen townships in Putnam County, Indiana. As of the 2020 census, its population was 1,494 (down from 1,569 at 2010) and it contained 634 housing units.

== History ==
The Brick Chapel United Methodist Church and James Edington Montgomery O'Hair House are listed on the National Register of Historic Places.

== Geography ==
According to the 2010 census, the township has a total area of 34.57 square miles (89.5 km^{2}), all land.

=== Cities and towns ===
- Bainbridge

=== Unincorporated towns ===
- Brick Chapel at 39.7117122°N 86.8691759°W
- Cary at 39.7069903°N 86.8230638°W

(This list is based on USGS data and may include former settlements.)
