= Northwood Historic District =

Historic district in Indiana, United States

- U.S. National Register of Historic Places
- U.S. Historic district
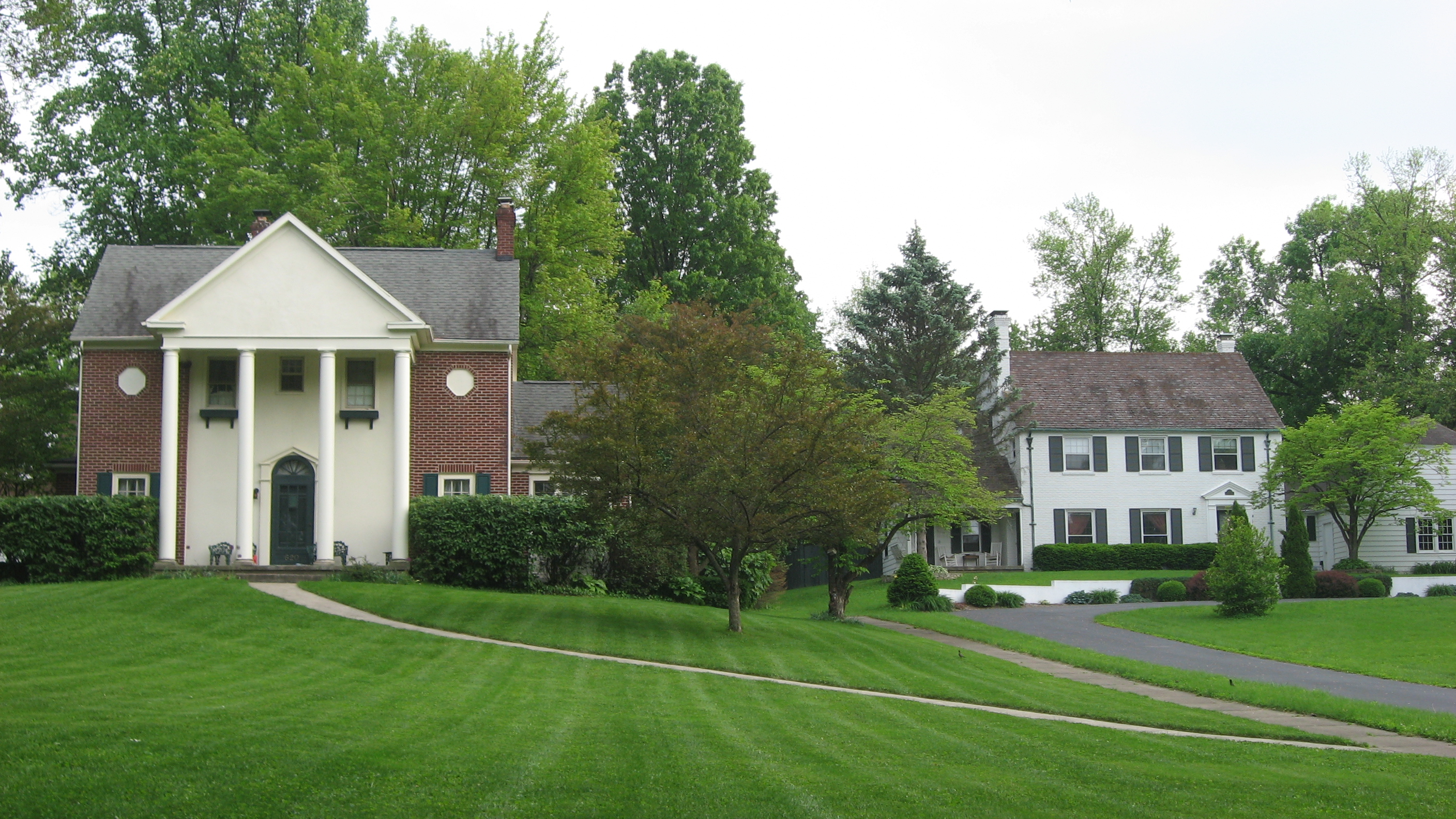
- Ridge Avenue in the Northwood Historic District, May 2011

- Location within Indiana Location within the United States
- Location: Roughly bounded by Shadowlawn, N. Arlington, E. Franklin & Hillsdale Aves., Greencastle, Indiana
- Coordinates: 39°38′44″N 86°51′16″W
- Area: 43 acres (17 ha)
- Built: 1826
- Built by: D.A. Bohlen & Son
- Architectural style: Colonial Revival, Bungalow/craftsman, Ranch
- MPS: Historic Residential Suburbs in the United States, 1830-1960 MPS
- NRHP reference No.: 11000388
- Added to NRHP: August 25, 2011

Northwood Historic District is a national historic district located at Greencastle, Indiana, United States. The district encompasses 100 contributing buildings and one contributing site in a predominantly residential section of Greencastle. The district developed between about 1920 and 1960 and includes notable examples of Colonial Revival, Bungalow / American Craftsman, and Ranch style architecture.

It was added to the National Register of Historic Places in 2011.
