= Greencastle Township, Putnam County, Indiana =

Greencastle Township
- Township
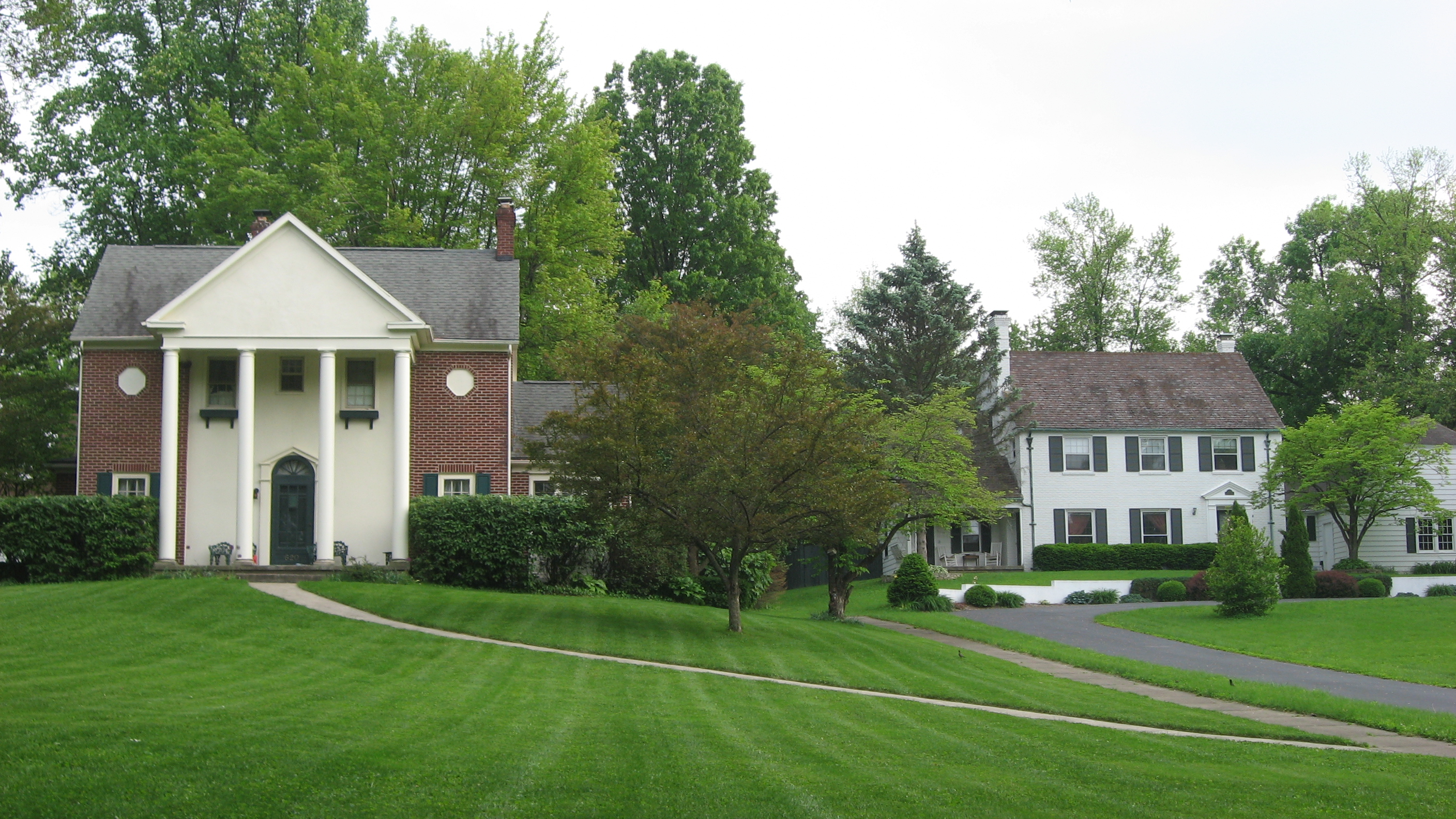
- The Northwood Historic District in Greencastle

- Coordinates: 39°38′37″N 86°50′49″W
- Country: United States
- State: Indiana
- County: Putnam

Government
  - Type: Indiana township

Area
  - Total: 34.44 sq mi (89.2 km^{2})
  - Land: 34.32 sq mi (88.9 km^{2})
  - Water: 0.12 sq mi (0.31 km^{2})
- Elevation: 830 ft (253 m)

Population (2020)
  - Total: 12,554
  - Density: 365.8/sq mi (141.2/km^{2})
- Time zone: UTC-5 (Eastern (EST))
  - Summer (DST): UTC-4 (EDT)
- Area code: 765
- FIPS code: 18-29376
- GNIS feature ID: 453347

Greencastle Township is one of thirteen townships in Putnam County, Indiana. As of the 2020 census, its population was 12,554 (down from 13,136 at 2010) and it contained 5,002 housing units. This township contains the county seat of Greencastle and is home to DePauw University, a liberal arts college of 2,300 students.

== History ==
Forest Hill Cemetery and the Alfred Hirt House are listed on the National Register of Historic Places.

== Geography ==
According to the 2010 census, the township has a total area of 34.44 square miles (89.2 km^{2}), of which 34.32 square miles (88.9 km^{2}) (or 99.65%) is land and 0.12 square miles (0.31 km^{2}) (or 0.35%) is water.

=== Cities and towns ===
- Greencastle

=== Unincorporated towns ===
- Limedale at 39.6192118°N 86.8791765°W

(This list is based on USGS data and may include former settlements.)

== Education ==
It is in Greencastle Community School Corporation, which includes Greencastle High School.
