= Eastern Enlargement Historic District =

Historic district in Indiana, United States

- U.S. National Register of Historic Places
- U.S. Historic district
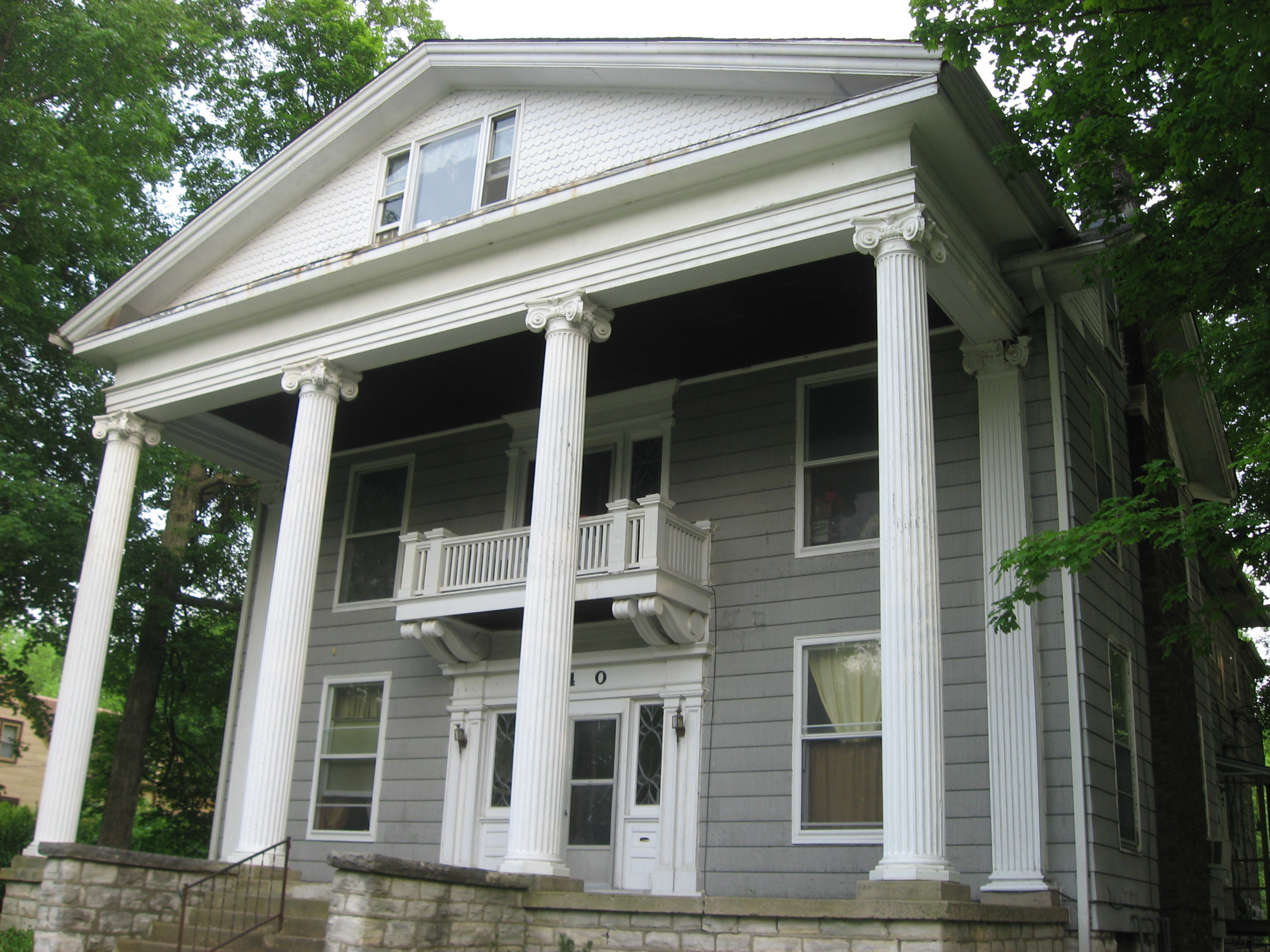
- James B. Nelson House, May 2011

- Location within Indiana Location within the United States
- Location: Roughly bounded by E. Franklin, Wood, Anderson, and College Sts., Greencastle, Indiana
- Coordinates: 39°38′30″N 86°51′22″W
- Area: 90 acres (36 ha)
- Built: 1840
- Architectural style: Greek Revival, Gothic Revival, Italianate, Queen Anne, Stick/Shingle, Bungalow/craftsman
- NRHP reference No.: 11000387
- Added to NRHP: June 23, 2011

Eastern Enlargement Historic District is a national historic district located at Greencastle, Indiana. The district encompasses 272 contributing buildings in a predominantly residential section of Greencastle. The district developed between about 1840 and 1961 and includes notable examples of Greek Revival, Gothic Revival, Italianate, Queen Anne, Stick Style, and Bungalow / American Craftsman style architecture. Located in the district are the separately listed Delta Kappa Epsilon Fraternity House, F.P. Nelson House and William C. Van Arsdel House. Other notable buildings include the Braman House (1840), James B. Nelson House, O'Hair House (c. 1885), John Ireland House, and a number of fraternity and sorority houses associated with DePauw University.

It was added to the National Register of Historic Places in 2011.
