= Old Greencastle Historic District =

Historic district in Indiana, United States

- U.S. National Register of Historic Places
- U.S. Historic district
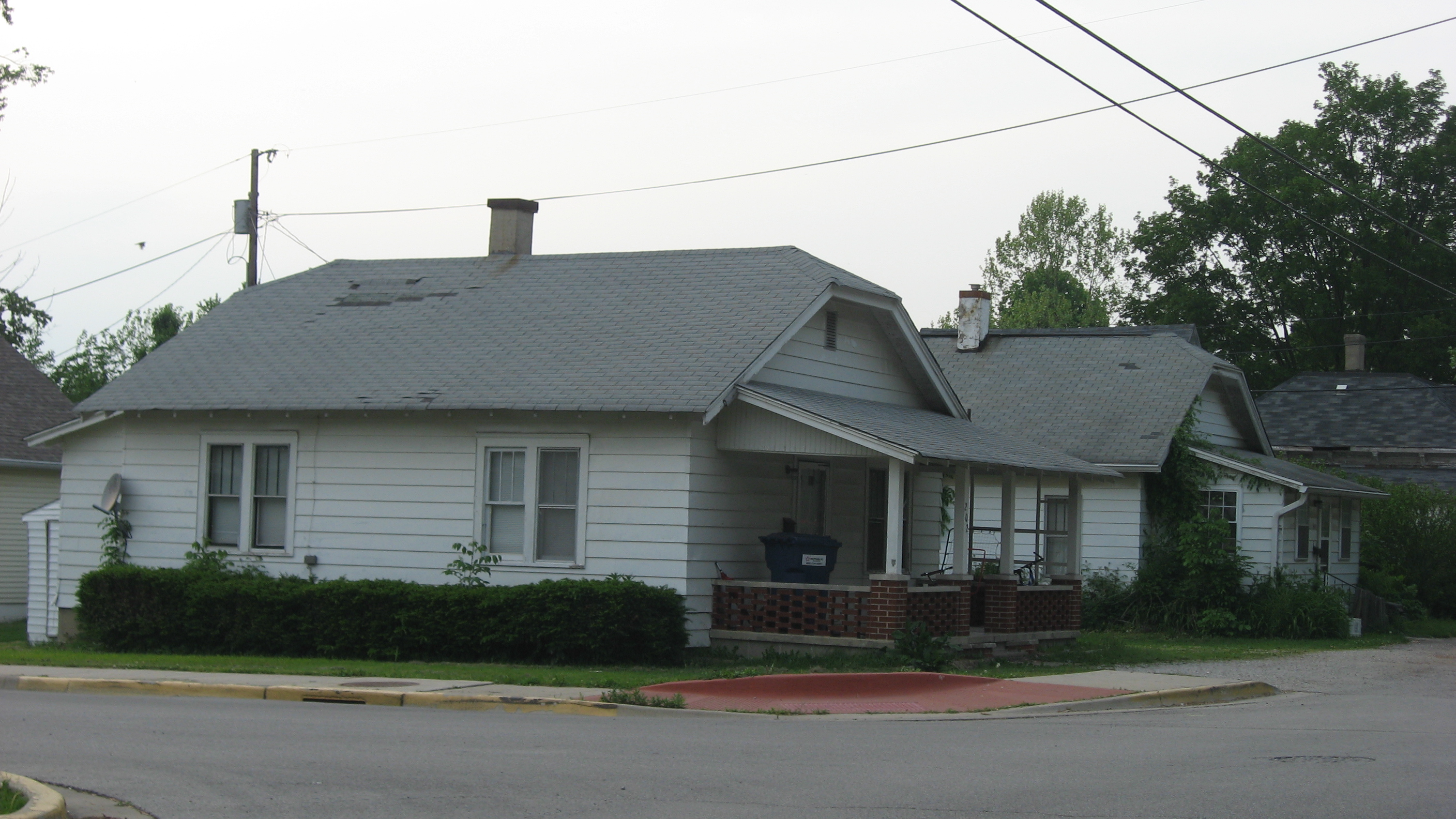
- Madison and Columbia, May 2011

- Location within Indiana Location within the United States
- Location: Roughly bounded by W. Liberty, Market, W. Poplar, and W. Gillespie Sts., Greencastle, Indiana
- Coordinates: 39°38′44″N 86°52′03″W
- Area: 32 acres (13 ha)
- Built: 1826
- Architectural style: Federal, Greek Revival, Italianate, Stick/Shingle, Prairie School, Bungalow/craftsman
- NRHP reference No.: 11000389
- Added to NRHP: June 23, 2011

Old Greencastle Historic District is a national historic district in Greencastle, Indiana. The district encompasses 79 contributing buildings in a predominantly residential section of Greencastle. The district developed between about 1826 and 1961 and includes notable examples of Federal, Greek Revival, Italianate, Stick Style, Prairie School, and Bungalow / American Craftsman-style architecture. Notable buildings include the Davidson House (c. 1826) and Gillespie-Lynch House (1830).

It was added to the National Register of Historic Places in 2011.
