= Brick Chapel United Methodist Church =

Historic church in Indiana, United States

- U.S. National Register of Historic Places
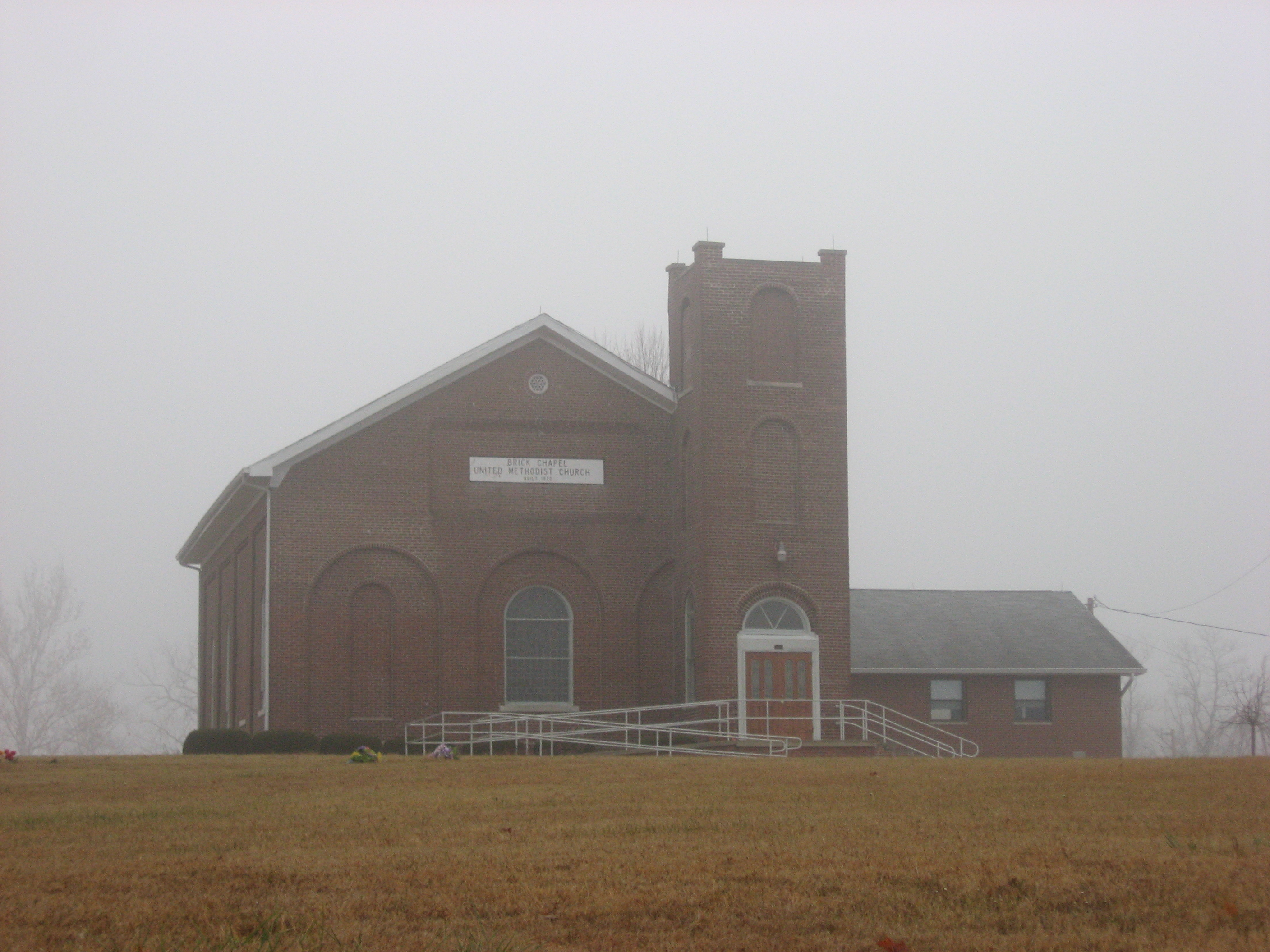
- Brick Chapel United Methodist Church, November 2010

- Location within Indiana Location within the United States
- Location: 3547 N. U.S. Route 231 at Brick Chapel in Monroe Township, Putnam County, Indiana
- Coordinates: 39°42′43″N 86°52′7″W
- Area: 1.5 acres (0.61 ha)
- Built: 1872, 1912, 1956
- Architectural style: Renaissance
- NRHP reference No.: 03000973
- Added to NRHP: September 28, 2003

Brick Chapel United Methodist Church, also known as Montgomery Chapel, is a historic Methodist church located in Monroe Township, Putnam County, Indiana. The church was built in 1872, and extensively remodeled in 1912 in the Renaissance Revival style. A Sunday School addition was built in 1956. It features a large stained glass window, recessed arches, and an entrance tower. Also on the property is the contributing church cemetery established in 1839, with over 2,000 burials.

It was listed on the National Register of Historic Places in 2003.
