= Greencastle, Indiana =

- City
- City of Greencastle
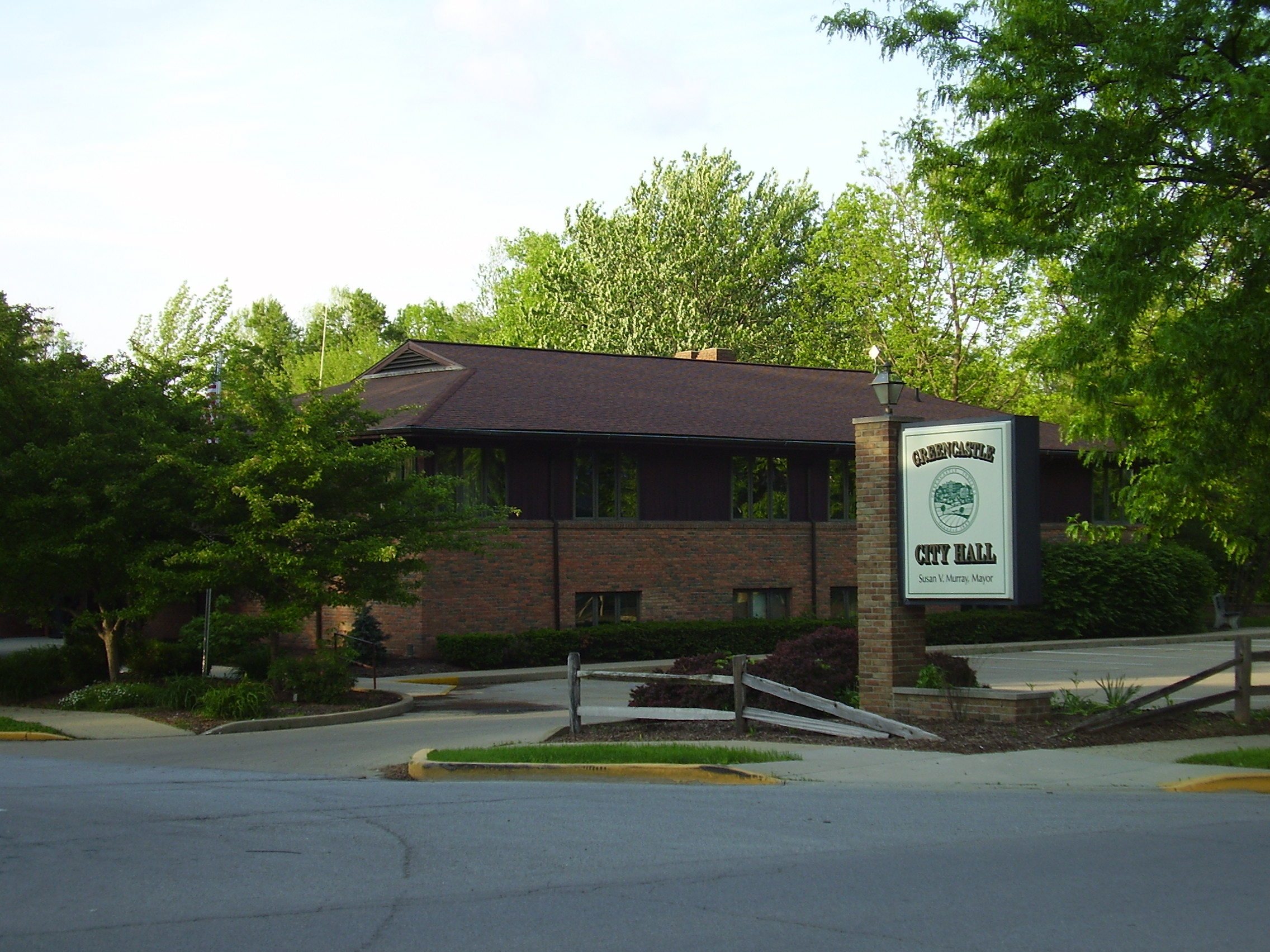
- City hall

- Flag

- Location of Greencastle in Putnam County, Indiana.
- Coordinates: 39°38′32″N 86°51′22″W
- Country: United States
- State: Indiana
- County: Putnam
- Township: Greencastle

Government
  - Type: Mayor–council
  - Mayor: Linda Dunbar (R)
  - Clerk-treasurer: Makayla Johnson
  - City council: Greencastle Common Council

Area
  - Total: 5.26 sq mi (13.63 km^{2})
  - Land: 5.21 sq mi (13.50 km^{2})
  - Water: 0.050 sq mi (0.13 km^{2})
- Elevation: 837 ft (255 m)

Population (2020)
  - Total: 9,820
  - Density: 1,884/sq mi (727.4/km^{2})
- Time zone: UTC-5 (EST)
  - Summer (DST): UTC-4 (EDT)
- ZIP code: 46135
- Area code: 765
- FIPS code: 18-29358
- GNIS feature ID: 2394980
- Website: cityofgreencastle.com

Greencastle is a city in Greencastle Township, Putnam County, Indiana, United States, and the county seat of Putnam County. It is located near Interstate 70 approximately halfway between Terre Haute and Indianapolis in the west-central portion of the state. The city is the home of DePauw University. The population was 9,820 at the 2020 census.

== History ==
Greencastle was founded in 1821 by Ephraim Dukes on a land grant. He named the settlement for his hometown of Greencastle, Pennsylvania. Greencastle was a village or town operating under authority of the Putnam County commissioners until March 9, 1849, when it became a town by special act of the local legislature. Greencastle, Indiana, officially became a city after an election held on July 8, 1861. The first mayor of Greencastle was E. R. Kercheval, a member of the Freemason Temple Lodge #47. The city became the county seat of Putnam County.

=== 1933 Bank Heist ===
John Herbert Dillinger, Jr. (June 22, 1903 – July 22, 1934) was an American gangster and bank-robber in the Depression-era United States. He was charged, but never convicted, with the murder of an East Chicago police officer whom he shot in the knee while fleeing the scene of his heist. John Dillinger's largest haul was at the Central National Bank in Greencastle, Indiana, in 1933 one of six banks he robbed in Indiana. In Our Past, Their Present: Historical Essays on Putnam County Indiana, John J. Baughman writes, "On Monday, October 23, 1933, four armed men entered the Central National Bank of Greencastle and escaped with $74,782.09 ($1.8 million in 2025). The Dillinger robbery became one of the major events of Greencastle history."

=== Historic Places ===
Greencastle has three historic neighborhoods – Old Greencastle, the Eastern Enlargement and the Northwood Neighborhood that were added to the National Register of Historic Places in 2011.

Greencastle is also home to 20 historical sites according to the National Register of Historic Places. These include The Appleyard, The Boulders house, Brick Chapel United Methodist Church, Courthouse Square Historic District, Delta Kappa Epsilon Fraternity house, East College of DePauw University, Forest Hill Cemetery, Richard M. Hazelett house, Alfred Hirt House, McKim Observatory, F.P. Nelson house, Old Greencastle Historic District, Lycurgus Stoner House, and William C. Van Arsdel house.

== Geography ==
According to the 2010 census, Greencastle has a total area of 5.291 square miles (13.70 km^{2}), of which 5.24 square miles (13.57 km^{2}) (or 99.04%) is land and 0.051 square miles (0.13 km^{2}) (or 0.96%) is water.

=== Climate ===
Humid continental climate is a climatic region typified by large seasonal temperature differences, with warm to hot (and often humid) summers and cold (sometimes severely cold) winters. The Köppen Climate Classification subtype for this climate is "Dfa"(Hot Summer Continental Climate).

Climate data for Greencastle, Indiana
Month	Jan	Feb	Mar	Apr	May	Jun	Jul	Aug	Sep	Oct	Nov	Dec	Year
Mean daily maximum °C (°F)	2 (36)	4 (40)	11 (51)	17 (63)	23 (74)	28 (83)	30 (86)	29 (85)	26 (79)	19 (67)	11 (52)	4 (39)	17 (63)
Mean daily minimum °C (°F)	−7 (19)	−6 (21)	−1 (31)	6 (42)	11 (51)	16 (61)	18 (64)	17 (62)	13 (55)	7 (44)	1 (33)	−5 (23)	6 (42)
Average precipitation mm (inches)	69 (2.7)	58 (2.3)	97 (3.8)	97 (3.8)	120 (4.7)	120 (4.8)	110 (4.2)	94 (3.7)	94 (3.7)	76 (3)	86 (3.4)	76 (3)	1,090 (43.1)
Source: Weatherbase

== Demographics ==
Historical population
Census	Pop.	Note	%±
1850	1,382		—
1860	2,096		51.7%
1870	3,227		54.0%
1880	3,644		12.9%
1890	4,390		20.5%
1900	3,661		−16.6%
1910	3,790		3.5%
1920	3,780		−0.3%
1930	4,613		22.0%
1940	4,872		5.6%
1950	6,888		41.4%
1960	8,506		23.5%
1970	8,852		4.1%
1980	8,403		−5.1%
1990	8,984		6.9%
2000	9,880		10.0%
2010	10,326		4.5%
2020	9,820		−4.9%
U.S. Decennial Census

=== 2020 census ===
As of the 2020 census, Greencastle had a population of 9,820, a drop of 4.9% from the 2010 census of 10,326 people. The median age was 30.7 years. 18.2% of residents were under the age of 18 and 16.4% of residents were 65 years of age or older. For every 100 females there were 89.6 males, and for every 100 females age 18 and over there were 86.7 males age 18 and over.

99.7% of residents lived in urban areas, while 0.3% lived in rural areas.

There were 3,564 households in Greencastle, of which 27.6% had children under the age of 18 living in them. Of all households, 36.1% were married-couple households, 19.1% were households with a male householder and no spouse or partner present, and 36.3% were households with a female householder and no spouse or partner present. About 37.0% of all households were made up of individuals and 17.5% had someone living alone who was 65 years of age or older.

There were 3,908 housing units, of which 8.8% were vacant. The homeowner vacancy rate was 1.3% and the rental vacancy rate was 6.7%.

Racial composition as of the 2020 census
Race	Number	Percent
White	8,514	86.7%
Black or African American	250	2.5%
American Indian and Alaska Native	31	0.3%
Asian	292	3.0%
Native Hawaiian and Other Pacific Islander	3	0.0%
Some other race	314	3.2%
Two or more races	416	4.2%
Hispanic or Latino (of any race)	391	4.0%

=== 2010 census ===
As of the census of 2010, there were 10,326 people, 3,368 households, and 1,989 families residing in the city. The population density was 1,970.6 inhabitants per square mile (760.9/km^{2}). There were 3,742 housing units at an average density of 714.1 per square mile (275.7/km^{2}). The racial makeup of the city was 92.4% White, 2.7% African American, 0.3% Native American, 1.9% Asian, 0.9% from other races, and 1.8% from two or more races. Hispanic or Latino of any race were 2.5% of the population.

There were 3,368 households, of which 30.9% had children under the age of 18 living with them, 42.0% were married couples living together, 12.9% had a female householder with no husband present, 4.2% had a male householder with no wife present, and 40.9% were non-families. 35.9% of all households were made up of individuals, and 15.4% had someone living alone who was 65 years of age or older. The average household size was 2.27 and the average family size was 2.93.

The median age in the city was 27.4 years. 19% of residents were under the age of 18; 28.5% were between the ages of 18 and 24; 19.7% were from 25 to 44; 18.6% were from 45 to 64; and 14.2% were 65 years of age or older. The gender makeup of the city was 46.7% male and 53.3% female.

=== 2000 census ===
As of the census of 2000, there were 9,880 people, 3,353 households, and 2,038 families residing in the city. The population density was 1,864.6 inhabitants per square mile (719.9/km^{2}). There were 3,532 housing units at an average density of 666.6 per square mile (257.4/km^{2}). The racial makeup of the city was 93.91% White, 2.67% African American, 0.25% Native American, 1.36% Asian, 0.08% Pacific Islander, 0.68% from other races, and 1.05% from two or more races. Hispanic or Latino of any race were 1.43% of the population.

There were 3,353 households, out of which 30.2% had children under the age of 18 living with them, 46.1% were married couples living together, 11.9% had a female householder with no husband present, and 39.2% were non-families. 34.3% of all households were made up of individuals, and 13.9% had someone living alone who was 65 years of age or older. The average household size was 2.28 and the average family size was 2.93.

In the city, the population was spread out, with 20.2% under the age of 18, 27.3% from 18 to 24, 22.2% from 25 to 44, 15.9% from 45 to 64, and 14.3% who were 65 years of age or older. The median age was 27 years. For every 100 females, there were 88.1 males. For every 100 females age 18 and over, there were 82.2 males.

The median income for a household in the city was $29,798, and the median income for a family was $41,250. Males had a median income of $30,940 versus $20,889 for females. The per capita income for the city was $15,351. About 7.6% of families and 9.8% of the population were below the poverty line, including 9.8% of those under age 18 and 11.3% of those age 65 or over.

== Culture ==
Greencastle hosts multiple festivals and cultural institutions. These include the Greencastle Music Fest, the Downtown Greencastle Farmers' Market, First Friday Greencastle, the Monon Bell Football Game, Music on the Square, the Putnam County 4-H Fair, and the Richard E. Peeler Art Center. The Putnam County Playhouse is also located in Greencastle.

== Parks ==
There are multiple parks and public recreational areas in the city. These include Big Walnut Sports Park, DePauw University Nature Park, Jaycee Park, and Robe Ann Park. Greencastle also maintains People Pathways, a network of trails and signed routes around Greencastle that also links to neighboring communities.

== Education ==
Public schools

Greencastle's public schools are operated by the Greencastle Community School Corporation. The Greencastle School Corporation consists of one Central Office; one High School, Greencastle High School, which hosts grades 9th through 12th; one Middle School, Greencastle Middle School, which hosts grades 6th through 8th; one Intermediate School, Tzouanakis Intermediate School, which hosts grades 3rd through 5th and two Primary Schools, Martha J. Ridpath Primary School (also known as Ridpath Primary) and Deer Meadow Primary School which each host kindergarten through 2nd grade.

Private schools

Peace Lutheran School is a private school in Greencastle, Indiana, which according to their website is "an outreach of Peace Lutheran Church." It was founded in 1984 as a preschool. In 1995, kindergarten was added as a half-day program. The year 2002 marked the beginning of the Primary School with the addition of 5th grade. (In Indiana, Primary Schools are typically interpreted as 1st through 2nd, 3rd, or 4th grades.) As of 2011, the school hosts grades kindergarten through 6th grade.

Colleges and universities

DePauw University is a private national liberal arts college. It was founded as Indiana Asbury University in 1837 as an all men's school. In 1867, Laura Beswick, Mary Simmons, Alice Allen, and Bettie Locke Hamilton (then Bettie Locke), the chief founder of Kappa Alpha Theta, America's first college women's fraternity, became the university's first four female students.

DePauw today has an enrollment of about 2400 students. Students hail from 42 states and 32 countries with a 20.4% multicultural enrollment. DePauw's liberal arts education gives students a chance to gain general knowledge outside of their direct area of study. DePauw consistently ranks among the top 50 liberal arts colleges in America in both U.S. News & World Report rankings and Kiplinger's “best value” list. In a 2009 Center for College Affordability & Productivity ranking published in Forbes magazine, DePauw was ranked No. 42 under “America’s Best Colleges.”

Ivy Tech Community College of Indiana (also Ivy Tech) is the nation's largest statewide community college with single accreditation. A 33,300 square foot, $8.6 million Ivy Tech campus was completed in 2009 in Greencastle. The Ivy Tech branch in Greencastle is also assisted financially by The Putnam County Community Foundation.

Other educational facilities

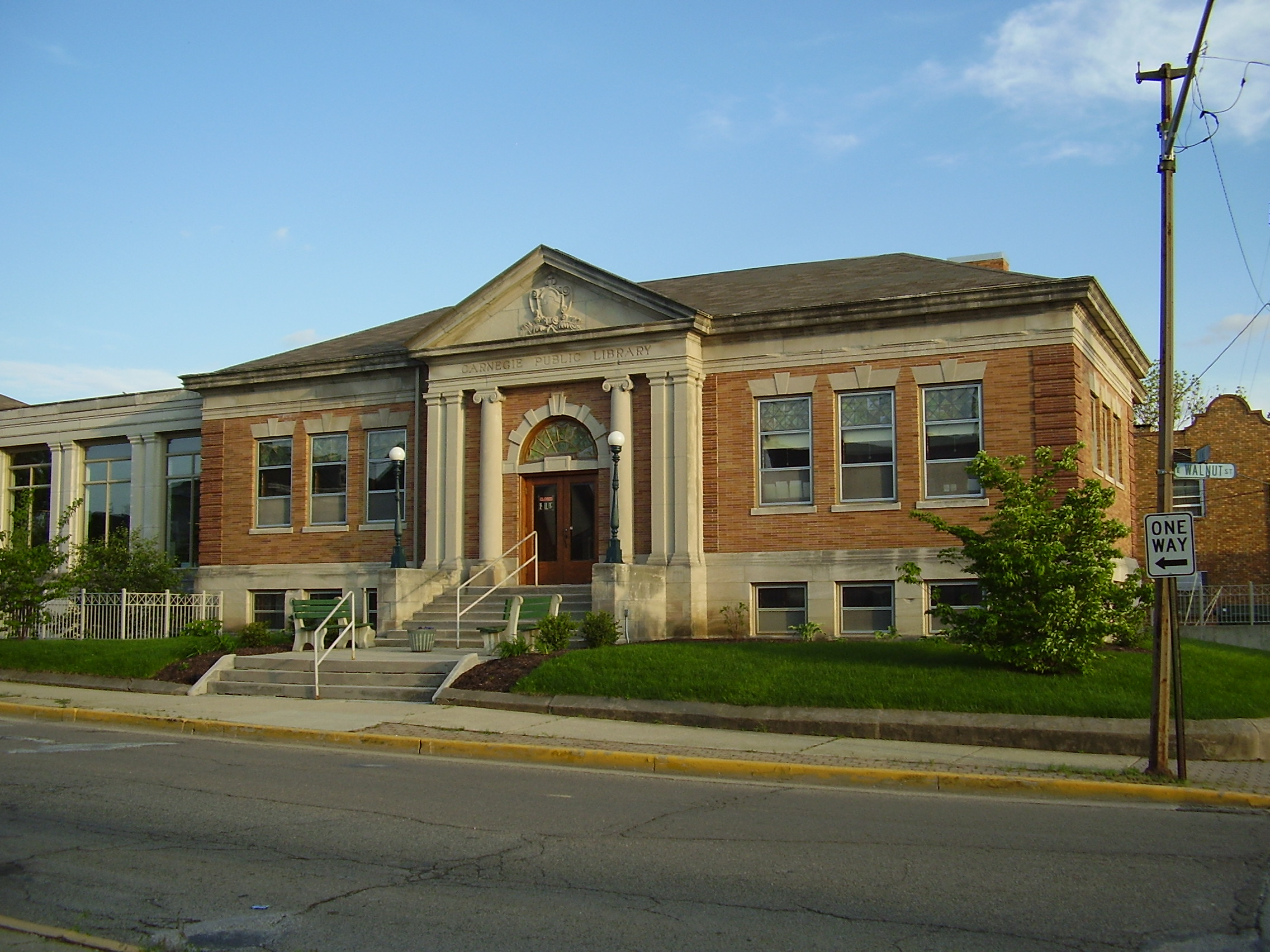
Putnam County Public Library in Greencastle; formerly the Carnegie Public Library

Greencastle is the home of the Putnam County Public Library, a public library which serves patrons from Putnam County and surrounding counties. Services include books, books on CD, ebooks, movies, music, newspapers, magazines, computer and Internet access, Wi-fi, inter-library loan, programming for all ages, author series, book discussion groups and multiple public meeting rooms. The PCPL Local History and Genealogy Department is dedicated to collecting, preserving, and providing public access to Putnam County's historical records. As of 2017 the library began an adult literacy program, the Putnam Adult Literacy Services (PALS). In conjunction with the PALS program, the PALS Pups program allows children to read to the certified "good citizen" dogs. The Putnam County Public Library is a Carnegie Library and was built in 1903. In 1996, a large addition made the library what it is today.

Greencastle also once had a municipal Carnegie library, which is now known as The William Weston Clarke Emison Museum of Art (otherwise known as The Emison Museum of Art or The Emison Art Center). The library became a museum in 1986, and was renamed to honor the financial contributions of James W. Emison, a longtime member of DePauw University's board of trustees and benefactor of the university, and other Emison family members. The building was constructed in 1908. The Emison Art Center was originally the Depauw University (then, Indiana Asbury University) campus library.

The Putnam County Museum houses a "permanent collection of nearly 2,000 Putnam County related artifacts offers the county residents and visitors a historical overview of the county, including its significance during the Civil War and a glimpse into everyday life of Putnam residents in the past. The Museum also showcases the Putnam County contemporary artists in revolving exhibits, featuring at least one new artist every month."

== Notable people ==
- William Atherton (1793–1863), soldier
- Jim Baird (born 1945), U.S. representative, former state senator and Putnam County commissioner
- Charles A. Beard (1874–1948) and Mary Ritter Beard (1876–1958), American historians
- Pearl Bryan (d. 1896), murder victim
- Nicholas Brendon (1971–2026), actor best known for Buffy the Vampire Slayer
- Samuel T. Busey (1833–1909), Civil War general and politician
- Amalia Küssner Coudert (1863–1932), miniaturist
- William Michael Crose (1867–1929), Governor of American Samoa
- S. H. Dudley (1864–1947), singer and pioneer recording artist
- Bob Flanigan (1926–2011), singer with The Four Freshmen
- Glenn Gass, (born 1956) rock 'n' roll music educator
- Garfield Thomas Haywood (1880–1931), pastor and founder Pentecostal Assemblies of the World
- Agnes Hitt (1845–1919), national president of the Woman's Relief Corps
- Jane Louise Kelly (born 1964), Federal appellate judge 8th Circuit
- Eli Lilly lived in Greencastle for several years; he opened a drugstore in Greencastle in 1861
- E. Jean Nelson Penfield (1872–1961) National President, Kappa Kappa Gamma
- Tad Robinson (born 1956), blues singer
- William F. Spurgin (1838–1904), US Army brigadier general, raised in Greencastle
- Alexander Campbell Stevenson (1802–1889), Indiana physician and state legislator
- Jesse W. Weik (1857–1930), Abraham Lincoln biographer
