= Indiana State Road 243 =

State highway in Indiana, United States

State Road 243
- SR 243 highlighted in red

Route information
- Maintained by INDOT
- Length: 9.443 mi (15.197 km)

Major junctions
- South end: SR 42 near Cunot
- I-70 at Jenkinsville
- North end: US 40 at Putnamville

Location
- Country: United States
- State: Indiana
- Counties: Owen, Putnam

Highway system
- Indiana State Highway System; Interstate; US; State; Scenic
← SR 241	→ SR 244

State Road 243 is a north–south highway located in the west central part of Indiana near Cloverdale.

== Route description ==
The southern terminus of State Road 243 is at State Road 42 in Cunot. Going north, the highway passes through the Leiber State Recreation Area, which features the man-made Cagles Mill Lake and Cataract Falls, the state's largest waterfalls. Cagles Mill and Dam are also an attraction. Just north of the park, State Road 243 has an interchange with Interstate 70. It then proceeds north to U.S. Route 40 in Putnamville.

== Major intersections ==
County	Location	mi	km	Destinations	Notes
Owen	Jackson Township	0.000	0.000	SR 42 – Terre Haute, Mooresville	Southern terminus of SR 243
Putnam	Warren Township	5.381– 5.545	8.660– 8.924	I-70 – Terre Haute, Indianapolis	Exit number 37 on I-70
Putnam	Putnamville	9.443	15.197	US 40 – Terre Haute, Brazil, Indianapolis	Northern terminus of SR 243
1.000 mi = 1.609 km; 1.000 km = 0.621 mi
