= Baker's Camp Covered Bridge =

Coordinates: 39.7491°N 86.7752°W

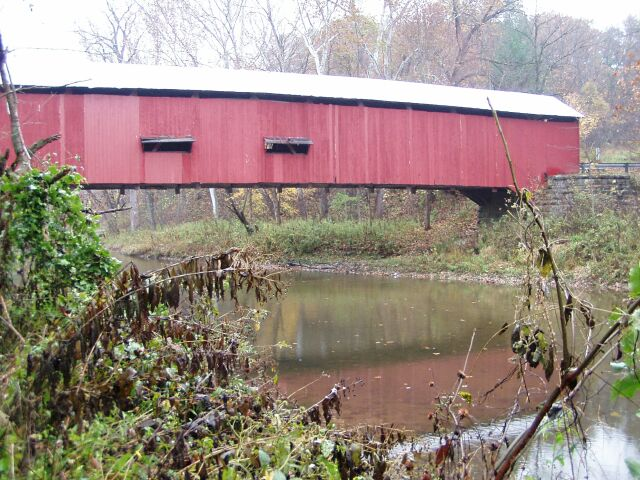
Baker's Camp Covered Bridge

Baker's Camp Covered Bridge, also known as Hillis Bridge, is a covered bridge in northern Putnam County, Indiana, east of the town of Bainbridge. It carries County Road E 650 north over Big Walnut Creek, about 1.25 miles (2 km) south of the road's intersection with U.S. 36.

Built in 1901 by J. J. Daniels, the bridge is 128 feet (39 m) long, 14 feet (4.3 m) wide, and 13 feet (4.0 m) high. It is an example of the Burr arch truss design. The bridge was listed on the National Register of Historic Places in 2024.

== Nearby bridges ==
- Rolling Stone Bridge
- Pine Bluff Bridge
