= James Townsend (abolitionist) =

American farmer and abolitionist

- Born: August 31, 1786
- Died: November 3, 1851 (aged 65)
- Occupation: Farmer
- Spouse: Katherine Davis
- Relatives: John Selby Townsend; James Robert Townsend

James Townsend (August 31, 1786 – November 3, 1851) was an American farmer, politician, and abolitionist who was among the early pioneers of Putnamville, Indiana.

== Biography ==
Townsend was descended from Richard Townsend, who emigrated from England, settling in Jamestown, Virginia in 1620. He was raised in Snow Hill, Maryland and married Katherine Davis, a cousin of the Radical Republican Henry Winter Davis. In 1808, Townsend left Maryland and established a plantation near Henderson, Kentucky, operated by 30 slaves he had inherited.

Around 1830, according to later recollection by his grandson, Townsend, "a man of strong religious convictions, becoming convinced of the evils of slavery, liberated his thirty slaves". He exhorted them to follow him in an exodus to Indiana – a free state – pledging that he would build houses for any who chose to accompany him, while those who opted to remain in Kentucky would instead be paid a cash settlement. Eight of his former slaves ultimately traveled with him to Indiana and assumed Townsend's surname as their own, as was customary at the time. (Note: According to the New York Public Library, "Originally slaves had no surnames, only given names, and did not take a surname unless need for a certain type of documentation or after manumission. Some enslaved people or newly freed people may have taken the name of the slave owner, or if they were on multiple plantations it could be the name of a previous slave owner, or once freed taken a different name entirely".)

In Indiana, Townsend worked as a merchant and donated the land for the establishment of the Putnamville Presbyterian Church. Townsend was financially ruined by the Panic of 1837. In 1838 he was elected to the Indiana House of Representatives and later moved to Clay County, Indiana. He died in 1851.

Among Townsend's children was John Selby Townsend. His grandchildren included James Robert Townsend and James Layman, who sat in the Indiana State Senate. James Robert Townsend's son, also James Townsend, was one of the original 1,000 participants in Lewis Terman's Genetic Studies of Genius.

The Townsend/Layman Museum in Putnamville is named after Townsend.

== See also ==
- History of slavery in Indiana
