= Putnamville, Indiana =

- Unincorporated community and Census-designated place
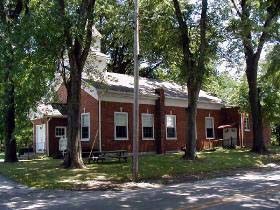
- Putnamville United Methodist Church

- Location within Indiana Location within the United States
- Coordinates: 39°34′22″N 86°52′25″W
- Country: United States
- State: Indiana
- County: Putnam
- Township: Warren
- Elevation: 702 ft (214 m)
- Time zone: UTC-5 (Eastern (EST))
  - Summer (DST): UTC-4 (EDT)
- ZIP code: 46135
- Area code: 765
- FIPS code: 18-62406
- GNIS feature ID: 2830507

Putnamville is an unincorporated community in Warren Township, Putnam County, in the U.S. state of Indiana.

== History ==
Putnamville was laid out in 1830. The community took its name from Putnam County. A post office called Putnamville has been in operation since 1832. The community was pioneered by James Townsend and his recently emancipated slaves.

=== The Townsends ===
Some historians group the early Townsends of Putnamville into the "Black Townsends" (emancipated persons who assumed James Townsend's surname) and the "White Townsends" (biological relatives of James Townsend). The Townsend/Layman Museum in Putnamville is named after Townsend.

==== Black Townsends ====
The Black Townsends were the first Black settlers in Putnam County, Indiana.

According to James Townsend's grandson, James Layman, they included Luke, Hetty, Amy, Tom, Sibley, and others. Layman told historian Jesse Weik that Sibley was the oldest of those who removed to Indiana and that she continued pipe smoking until after the age of 90, recalling her doing so during visits to the residence of his grandmother — James Townsend's wife — Katherine Townsend. She was probably the mother of Luke Townsend.

===== Luke Townsend =====
Luke Townsend – who was the au pair for James Townsend's daughter, Mary, prior to his emancipation – established the first Sunday School in Putnam County and is credited as the founder of the congregation that eventually became Bethel African Methodist Episcopal Church in Greencastle, Indiana, at one time the largest Black church in Indiana. According to a 1942 article in The Daily Banner of Greencastle, Luke Townsend was after death remembered as "one of the best citizens the county has had."

Luke Townsend had five children. One son, Robert Townsend, served in the 28th United States Colored Infantry Regiment during the American Civil War. Another son was among the witnesses who, in the late 1800s, testified against a man arrested for harassing Black youths playing in a field in Putnam County in what became the first case of a white citizen being criminally convicted on the basis of the testimony of a Black citizen in Putnam County. Luke Townsend's son Jay, who was still alive as of 1933, established a reputation as one of "Greencastle's most respected citizens".

==== White Townsends ====
Among James Townsend's children was John Selby Townsend, who later sat in the Iowa General Assembly and served as county attorney of Monroe County, Iowa. James Townsend's grandson, James Robert Townsend, was the first United States man to complete teacher training under the tutelage of Maria Montessori. Another grandson, James Layman, sat in the Indiana State Senate.

== Geography ==
Putnamville is located along U.S. Route 40 at the intersection of State Road 243.

== Demographics ==
The United States Census Bureau defined Putnamville as a census designated place in the 2022 American Community Survey.
