= Jenkinsville =

Jenkinsville may refer to:

- Jenkinsville, Indiana
- Jenkinsville, South Carolina
- Jenkinsville, Wisconsin
