= Franklin Township, Putnam County, Indiana =

Franklin Township
- Township
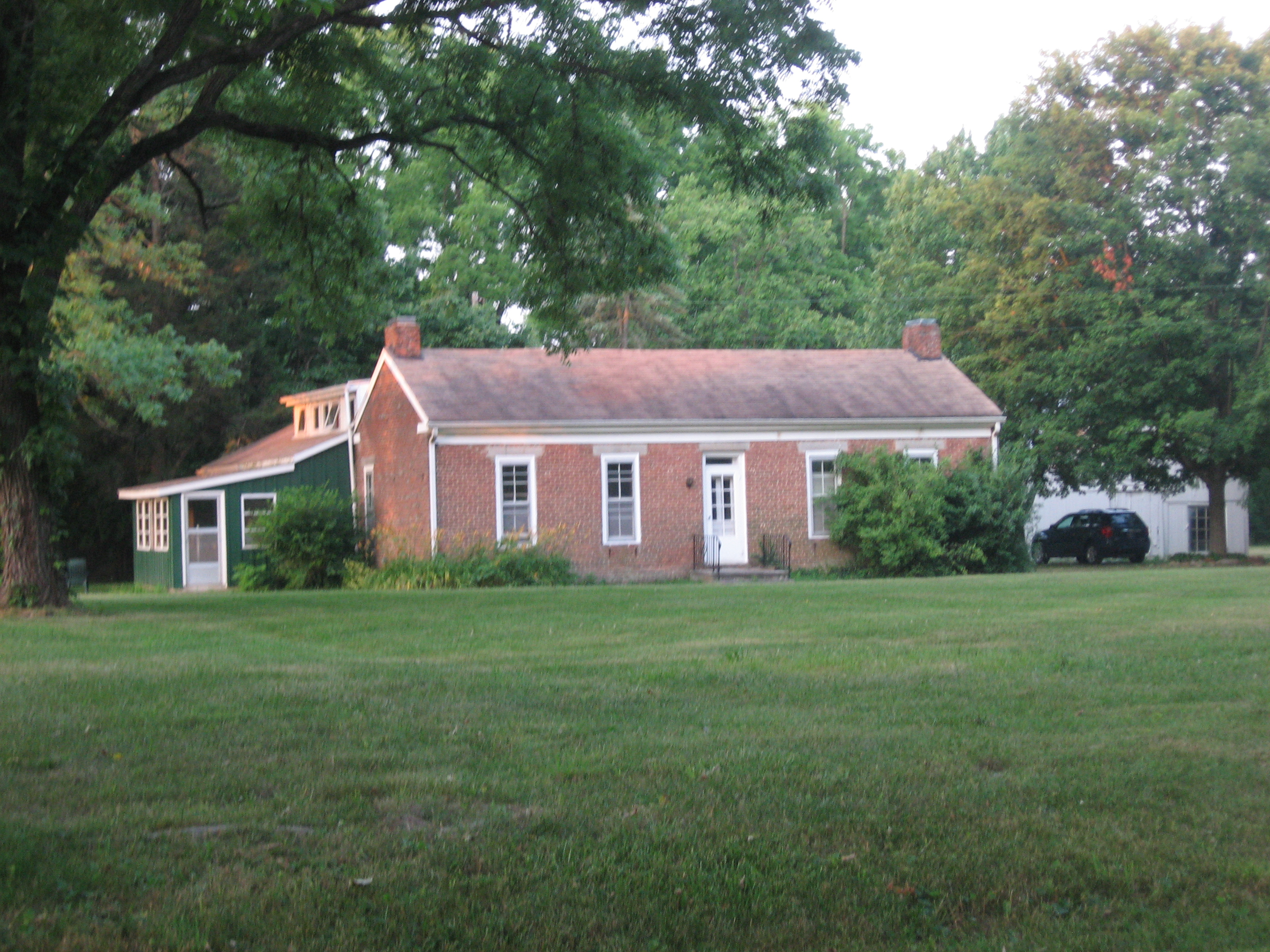
- The Samuel Brown House, a historic site in the township

- Coordinates: 39°49′11″N 86°50′41″W
- Country: United States
- State: Indiana
- County: Putnam

Government
  - Type: Indiana township

Area
  - Total: 34.4 sq mi (89 km^{2})
  - Land: 34.38 sq mi (89.0 km^{2})
  - Water: 0.02 sq mi (0.052 km^{2})
- Elevation: 804 ft (245 m)

Population (2020)
  - Total: 1,609
  - Density: 46.80/sq mi (18.07/km^{2})
- Time zone: UTC-5 (Eastern (EST))
  - Summer (DST): UTC-4 (EDT)
- Area code: 765
- FIPS code: 18-25576
- GNIS feature ID: 453312

Franklin Township is one of thirteen townships in Putnam County, Indiana. As of the 2020 census, its population was 1,609 (down from 1,690 at 2010) and it contained 715 housing units.

== History ==
The Samuel Brown House was listed on the National Register of Historic Places in 2006.

== Geography ==
According to the 2010 census, the township has a total area of 34.4 square miles (89 km^{2}), of which 34.38 square miles (89.0 km^{2}) (or 99.94%) is land and 0.02 square miles (0.052 km^{2}) (or 0.06%) is water.

=== Cities and towns ===
- Roachdale (partial)

=== Unincorporated towns ===
- Carpentersville at 39.8056011°N 86.8055632°W
- Fincastle at 39.8081005°N 86.8950090°W
- Raccoon at 39.8561557°N 86.8963976°W

(This list is based on USGS data and may include former settlements.)

== Education ==
Township residents are served by the Roachdale-Franklin Township Public Library.
