= Mount Meridian, Indiana =

Mount Meridian
- village
- Location within the state of Indiana Mount Meridian (the United States)
- Coordinates: 39°36′07″N 86°45′27″W
- Country: United States
- State: Indiana
- County: Putnam
- Township: Marion
- Elevation: 810 ft (250 m)
- Time zone: UTC-5 (Eastern (EST))
  - Summer (DST): UTC-4 (EDT)
- ZIP code: 46128
- Area code: 765
- GNIS feature ID: 439601

Mount Meridian is a village in Marion Township, Putnam County, Indiana that was originally called Carthage when it was laid out by William Heavin and Bryce W. Miller in 1833. It was later renamed so that it had the same name as its post-office.

Primarily on US 40, it is approximately 40 miles (64 km) west-south-west of Indianapolis and 8 miles (13 km) south-east of Greencastle.

A post office called Mount Meridian was established in 1835, and remained in operation until it was discontinued in 1905.

== Hurst Brothers ==
In the late 19th century, the Hurst Brothers general merchants was run by Squire J. Hurst and his brother. Squire Hurst had gone to Mount Meridian in 1885, having been a farmer in Greencastle and Warren Townships. His older brother William Hurst had bought and shipped livestock until 1880. Alongside the mercantile partnership, Squire owned a 115 acres (47 ha) farm in Greencastle Township; whilst William was also a postmaster in Mount Meridian, and owned a 121 acres (49 ha) farm in Greencastle and Warren Townships.

== The Half Way House ==
The Half Way House was originally built in 1826 by William Heavin on the north side of the Old National Road (US 40) near the town square. The town is roughly halfway between Terre Haute and Indianapolis, hence its name. Such people as Henry Ward Beecher and Abraham Lincoln spent the night there. The Heavin family had owned and operated The Lovely Mount Tavern in Radford Virginia, which is where they migrated from. The house was then owned and operated by such people as John David Scott, Thomas and Martha (Bourne) Vermillion, Asbury and Cora (Bourne) McCammack, and was last run by their son, Virgil McCammack. Business slowed by 1940, as the automobile lessened the need of an inn for its location.

== Putnam Park Road Course ==
About 1/2 mile southwest of the community is the Putnam Park Road Course. Mainly used as a test track, it holds races, practices and special events for all types of motor vehicles, including motorcycles, Porsche, Dodge Viper, and professional race car drivers of all types and levels. It is also a primary location to test new vehicles and race car models. The track was featured on the Speed Channel in 2007.
