= Keytsville, Indiana =

Unincorporated community in Indiana, United States

- rural area
- Location within Indiana Location within the United States
- Coordinates: 39°39′05″N 87°00′44″W
- Country: United States
- State: Indiana
- County: Parke, Putnam
- Township: Jackson, Madison
- Elevation: 804 ft (245 m)
- Time zone: UTC-5 (Eastern (EST))
  - Summer (DST): UTC-4 (EDT)
- ZIP code: 46135
- Area code: 765
- GNIS feature ID: 437283

Keytsville or Keyt's Corner was a rural area in Parke and Putnam counties, in of Indiana.
