= Russell Township, Putnam County, Indiana =

Russell Township
- Township
- Coordinates: 39°48′46″N 86°57′04″W
- Country: United States
- State: Indiana
- County: Putnam

Government
  - Type: Indiana township

Area
  - Total: 35.58 sq mi (92.2 km^{2})
  - Land: 35.53 sq mi (92.0 km^{2})
  - Water: 0.05 sq mi (0.13 km^{2})
- Elevation: 807 ft (246 m)

Population (2020)
  - Total: 755
  - Density: 21.2/sq mi (8.20/km^{2})
- Time zone: UTC-5 (Eastern (EST))
  - Summer (DST): UTC-4 (EDT)
- Area code: 765
- FIPS code: 18-66474
- GNIS feature ID: 453817

Russell Township is one of thirteen townships in Putnam County, Indiana. As of the 2020 census, its population was 755 (down from 823 at 2010) and it contained 335 housing units.

Russell Township was established in 1828.

== Geography ==
According to the 2010 census, the township has a total area of 35.58 square miles (92.2 km^{2}), of which 35.53 square miles (92.0 km^{2}) (or 99.86%) is land and 0.05 square miles (0.13 km^{2}) (or 0.14%) is water.

=== Cities and towns ===
- Russellville

=== Unincorporated towns ===
- Blakesburg at 39.8072671°N 86.9100093°W

(This list is based on USGS data and may include former settlements.)
