= Jefferson Township, Putnam County, Indiana =

Jefferson Township
- Township
- Coordinates: 39°34′02″N 86°42′51″W
- Country: United States
- State: Indiana
- County: Putnam

Government
  - Type: Indiana township

Area
  - Total: 41.1 sq mi (106 km^{2})
  - Land: 41.1 sq mi (106 km^{2})
  - Water: 0 sq mi (0 km^{2})
- Elevation: 873 ft (266 m)

Population (2020)
  - Total: 1,318
  - Density: 32.1/sq mi (12.4/km^{2})
- Time zone: UTC-5 (Eastern (EST))
  - Summer (DST): UTC-4 (EDT)
- Area code: 765
- FIPS code: 18-38196
- GNIS feature ID: 453497

Jefferson Township is one of thirteen townships in Putnam County, Indiana. As of the 2020 census, its population was 1,318 (up from 1,252 at 2010) and it contained 526 housing units.

== History ==
The Melville F. McHaffie Farm was listed on the National Register of Historic Places in 1983. The former Mill Creek Township consolidated with Jefferson Township in the mid-1930s.

== Geography ==
According to the 2010 census, the township has a total area of 41.1 square miles (106 km^{2}), all land.

=== Unincorporated towns ===
- Belle Union at 39.5731022°N 86.7061162°W
- Broad Park at 39.5858799°N 86.6694480°W

(This list is based on USGS data and may include former settlements.)
