= Brunerstown, Indiana =

- Unincorporated community
- Location within Indiana Location within the United States
- Coordinates: 39°39′09″N 86°59′54″W
- Country: United States
- State: Indiana
- County: Putnam
- Township: Madison
- Elevation: 810 ft (250 m)
- Time zone: UTC-5 (Eastern (EST))
  - Summer (DST): UTC-4 (EDT)
- ZIP code: 46135
- Area code: 765
- GNIS feature ID: 431667

Brunerstown is an unincorporated community in Madison Township, Putnam County, in the U.S. state of Indiana.

== History ==
Brunerstown was founded in 1837 by Joseph Bruner, and named for him. A post office was established at Brunerstown in 1839, and remained in operation until it was discontinued in 1859.
