= Cloverdale Township, Putnam County, Indiana =

Cloverdale Township
- Township
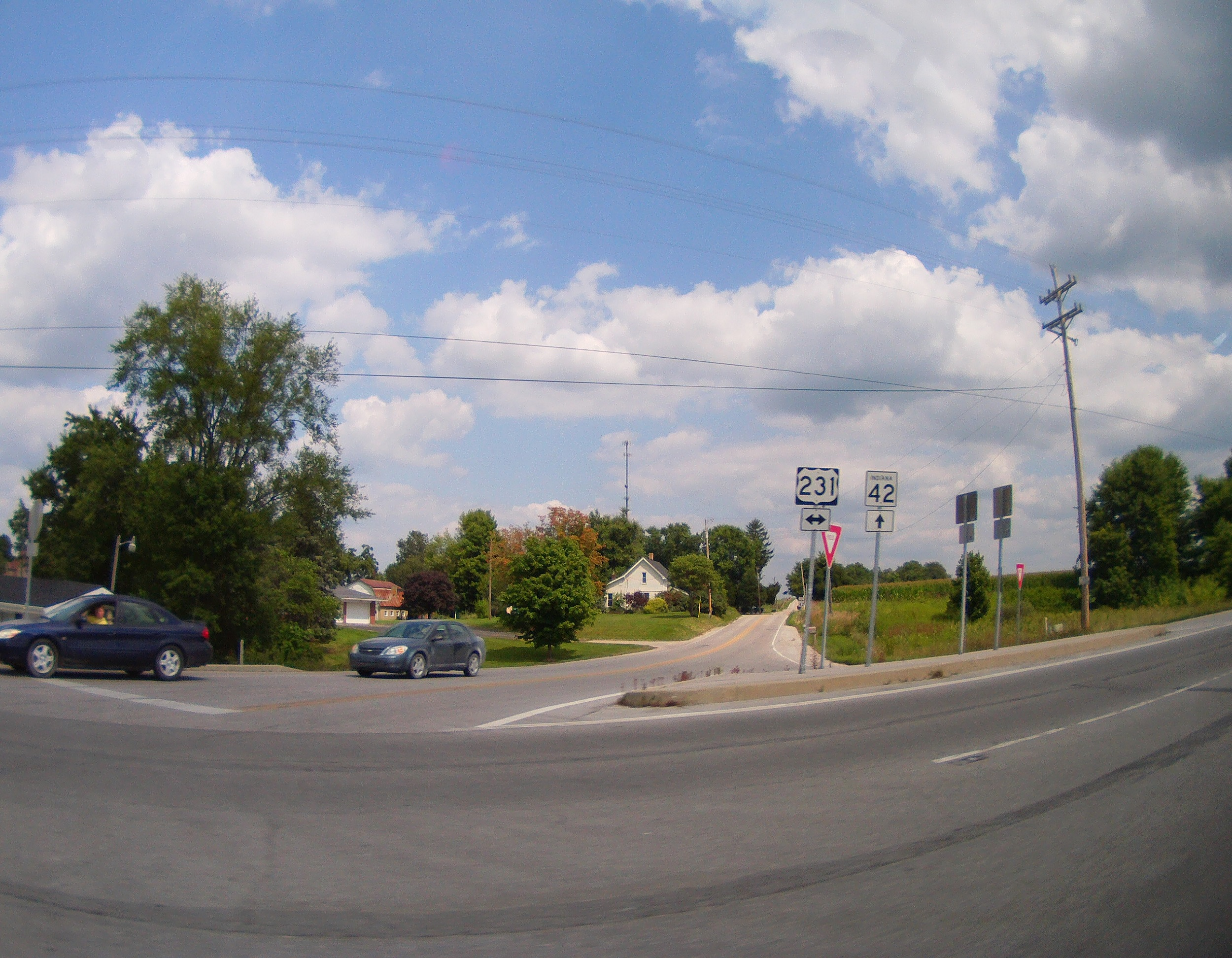
- Intersection of U.S. 231 and State Highway 42 in Cloverdale Township

- Coordinates: 39°30′02″N 86°47′41″W
- Country: United States
- State: Indiana
- County: Putnam

Government
  - Type: Indiana township

Area
  - Total: 46.18 sq mi (119.6 km^{2})
  - Land: 45.72 sq mi (118.4 km^{2})
  - Water: 0.46 sq mi (1.2 km^{2})
- Elevation: 794 ft (242 m)

Population (2020)
  - Total: 3,887
  - Density: 85.02/sq mi (32.83/km^{2})
- Time zone: UTC-5 (Eastern (EST))
  - Summer (DST): UTC-4 (EDT)
- Area code: 765
- FIPS code: 18-13870
- GNIS feature ID: 453235

Cloverdale Township is one of thirteen townships in Putnam County, Indiana. As of the 2020 census, its population was 3,887 (down from 3,929 at 2010) and it contained 1,698 housing units.

Cloverdale Township was organized in 1846.

== Geography ==
According to the 2010 census, the township has a total area of 46.18 square miles (119.6 km^{2}), of which 45.72 square miles (118.4 km^{2}) (or 99.00%) is land and 0.46 square miles (1.2 km^{2}) (or 1.00%) is water.

=== Cities and towns ===
- Cloverdale (partial)
