= Carpentersville, Indiana =

- Unincorporated community
- Location within Indiana Location within the United States
- Coordinates: 39°48′20″N 86°48′20″W
- Country: United States
- State: Indiana
- County: Putnam
- Township: Franklin
- Elevation: 866 ft (264 m)
- Time zone: UTC-5 (Eastern (EST))
  - Summer (DST): UTC-4 (EDT)
- ZIP code: 46172
- Area code: 765
- GNIS feature ID: 432163

Carpentersville is an unincorporated community in Franklin Township, Putnam County, in the U.S. state of Indiana.

== History ==
Carpentersville was laid out about 1840 by Philip Carpenter, and named for him. A post office was established at Carpentersville in 1850, and remained in operation until it was discontinued in 1910.
