= Cunot, Indiana =

- Unincorporated Community
- Location within Indiana Location within the United States
- Coordinates: 39°27′23″N 86°51′17″W
- Country: United States
- State: Indiana
- County: Owen
- Township: Jackson
- Elevation: 794 ft (242 m)
- Time zone: UTC-5 (Eastern (EST))
  - Summer (DST): UTC-4 (EDT)
- ZIP code: 46120
- Area codes: 812, 930
- GNIS feature ID: 449305

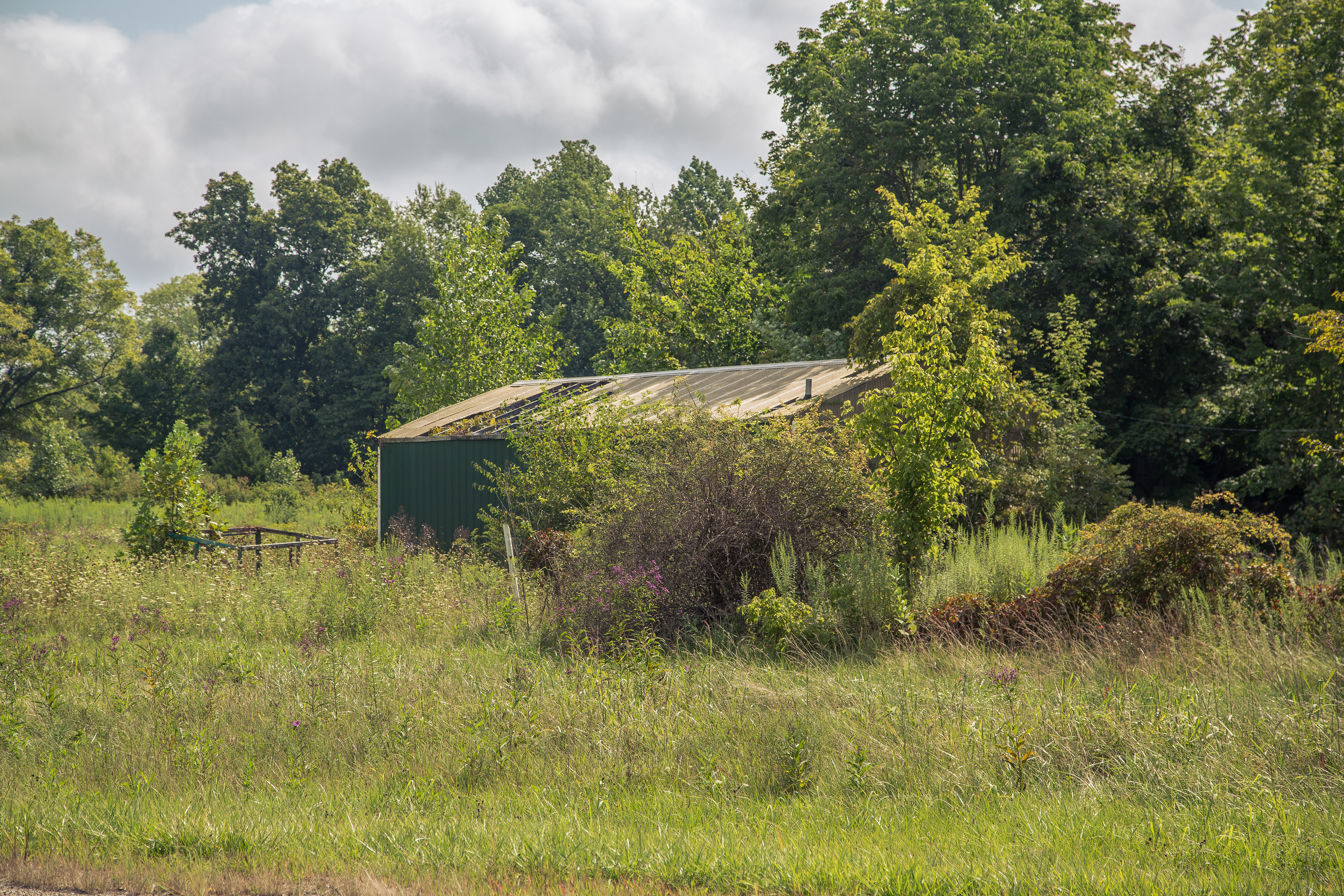
A scene in Cunot

Cunot is an unincorporated community in Jackson Township, Owen County, in the U.S. state of Indiana. It lies near the intersection of Indiana Highway 42 and Indiana Highway 243, which is a community about twenty miles north of the city of Spencer, the county seat of Owen County. Its elevation is 722 feet (220 m), and it is located at 39°27′23″N 86°51′17″W (39.4564339 -86.8547315). Although this community is located within Owen County on its northern boundary, it has an address of Cloverdale, Indiana, in Putnam County, which is about six miles northeast of the community.

== History ==
A post office was established at Cunot in 1894, and remained in operation until it was discontinued in 1905. The community's name may be derived from "Q-knot", alluding to the shape of a local road.

== Geography ==
This community is on the east side of Cagles Mill Lake, which is located at 39°27′52″N 86°52′58″W (39.4644628 -86.8829156).

Richard Lieber State Park is northwest of this community, the park located at 39°28′45″N 86°52′28″W (39.4792115 -86.8744544).

== School districts ==
- Cloverdale Community Schools.

== Political districts ==
- State House District 46
- State Senate District 39
