= Russellville, Indiana =

- Town
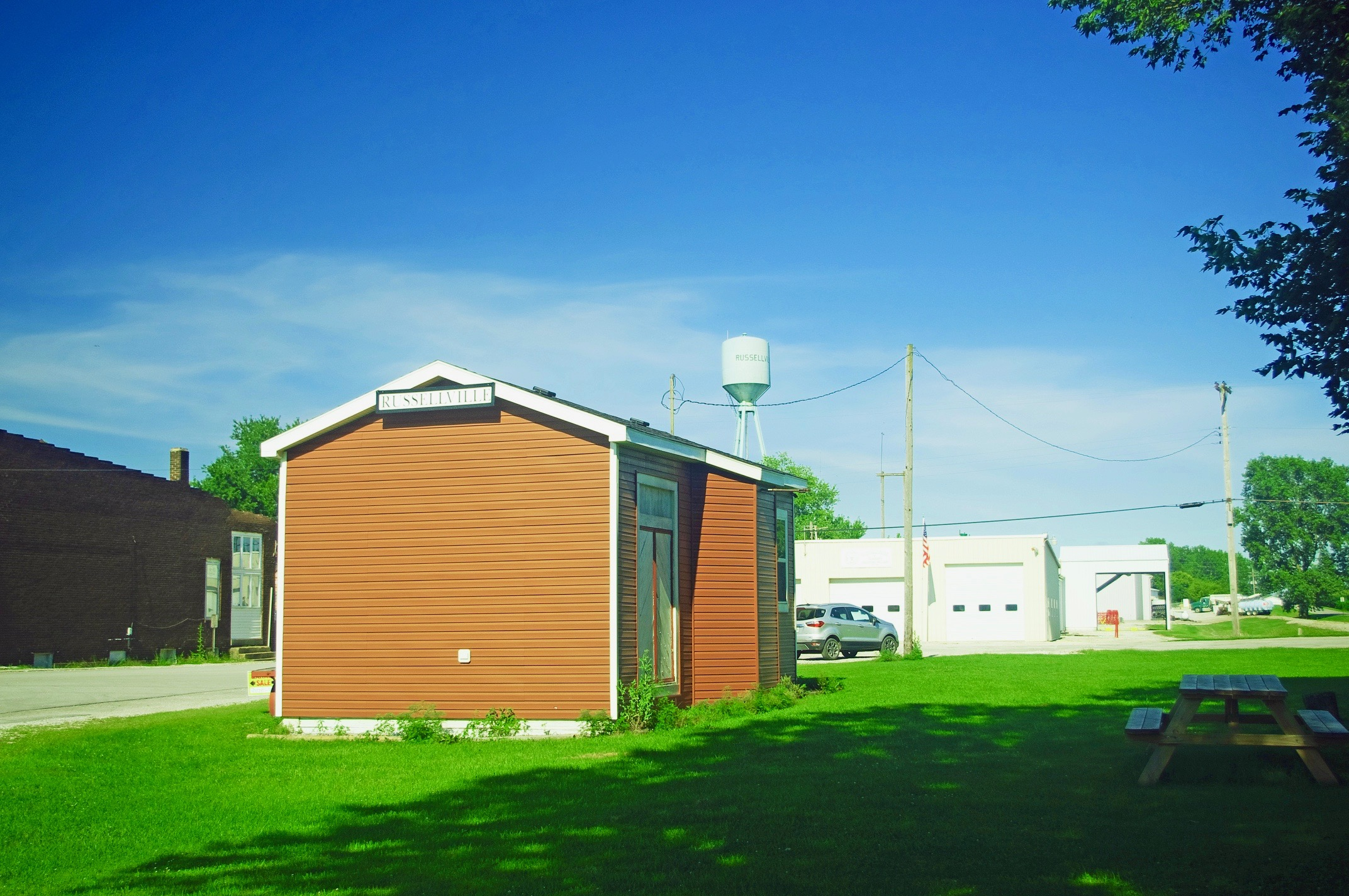
- Russellville Depot

- Location of Russellville in Putnam County, Indiana.
- Coordinates: 39°51′25″N 86°59′00″W
- Country: United States
- State: Indiana
- County: Putnam
- Township: Russell

Area
  - Total: 0.20 sq mi (0.52 km^{2})
  - Land: 0.20 sq mi (0.52 km^{2})
  - Water: 0 sq mi (0.00 km^{2})
- Elevation: 827 ft (252 m)

Population (2020)
  - Total: 306
  - Density: 1,519/sq mi (586.4/km^{2})
- Time zone: UTC-5 (Eastern (EST))
  - Summer (DST): UTC-4 (EDT)
- ZIP code: 46175
- Area code: 765
- FIPS code: 18-66510
- GNIS feature ID: 2396894
- Website: www.townofrussellville.com

Russellville is a town in Russell Township, Putnam County, in the U.S. state of Indiana. As of the 2020 census, Russellville had a population of 306.

== History ==
Russellville was laid out in 1828. The town took its name from Russell Township. A post office has been in operation at Russellville since 1832. Russellville was incorporated in the 1880s when the railroad was extended to that point.

== Geography ==
According to the 2010 census, Russellville has a total area of 0.2 square miles (0.52 km^{2}), all land.

== Demographics ==
Historical population
Census	Pop.	Note	%±
1880	157		—
1890	327		108.3%
1900	298		−8.9%
1910	443		48.7%
1920	463		4.5%
1930	411		−11.2%
1940	380		−7.5%
1950	361		−5.0%
1960	372		3.0%
1970	390		4.8%
1980	376		−3.6%
1990	336		−10.6%
2000	340		1.2%
2010	358		5.3%
2020	306		−14.5%
U.S. Decennial Census

=== 2010 census ===
As of the census of 2010, there were 358 people, 145 households, and 97 families living in the town. The population density was 1,790.0 inhabitants per square mile (691.1/km^{2}). There were 161 housing units at an average density of 805.0 per square mile (310.8/km^{2}). The racial makeup of the town was 97.5% White, 1.1% Native American, 0.8% Pacific Islander, and 0.6% from two or more races. Hispanic or Latino of any race were 0.3% of the population.

There were 145 households, of which 35.9% had children under the age of 18 living with them, 46.9% were married couples living together, 14.5% had a female householder with no husband present, 5.5% had a male householder with no wife present, and 33.1% were non-families. 28.3% of all households were made up of individuals, and 13.8% had someone living alone who was 65 years of age or older. The average household size was 2.47 and the average family size was 2.95.

The median age in the town was 42.6 years. 22.3% of residents were under the age of 18; 9.3% were between the ages of 18 and 24; 23.8% were from 25 to 44; 31.4% were from 45 to 64; and 13.4% were 65 years of age or older. The gender makeup of the town was 50.0% male and 50.0% female.

=== 2000 census ===
As of the census of 2000, there were 340 people, 137 households, and 90 families living in the town. The population density was 1,712.7 inhabitants per square mile (661.3/km^{2}). There were 149 housing units at an average density of 750.6 per square mile (289.8/km^{2}). The racial makeup of the town was 97.65% White, 0.88% Native American, 0.59% Asian, and 0.88% from two or more races. Hispanic or Latino of any race were 1.47% of the population.

There were 137 households, out of which 35.8% had children under the age of 18 living with them, 52.6% were married couples living together, 5.1% had a female householder with no husband present, and 33.6% were non-families. 32.1% of all households were made up of individuals, and 13.9% had someone living alone who was 65 years of age or older. The average household size was 2.48 and the average family size was 3.12.

In the town, the population was spread out, with 29.4% under the age of 18, 5.6% from 18 to 24, 29.7% from 25 to 44, 18.8% from 45 to 64, and 16.5% who were 65 years of age or older. The median age was 36 years. For every 100 females, there were 88.9 males. For every 100 females age 18 and over, there were 89.0 males.

The median income for a household in the town was $34,375, and the median income for a family was $41,458. Males had a median income of $31,827 versus $25,000 for females. The per capita income for the town was $15,236. About 4.1% of families and 6.1% of the population were below the poverty line, including none of those under age 18 and 20.3% of those age 65 or over.
