= Jackson Township, Putnam County, Indiana =

Jackson Township
- Township
- Coordinates: 39°48′48″N 86°44′26″W
- Country: United States
- State: Indiana
- County: Putnam

Government
  - Type: Indiana township

Area
  - Total: 34.56 sq mi (89.5 km^{2})
  - Land: 34.56 sq mi (89.5 km^{2})
  - Water: 0 sq mi (0 km^{2})
- Elevation: 797 ft (243 m)

Population (2020)
  - Total: 857
  - Density: 24.8/sq mi (9.57/km^{2})
- Time zone: UTC-5 (Eastern (EST))
  - Summer (DST): UTC-4 (EDT)
- Area code: 765
- FIPS code: 18-37332
- GNIS feature ID: 453462

Jackson Township is one of thirteen townships in Putnam County, Indiana. As of the 2020 census, its population was 857 (slightly up from 854 at 2010) and it contained 382 housing units.

== Geography ==
According to the 2010 census, the township has a total area of 34.56 square miles (89.5 km^{2}), all land.

=== Cities and towns ===
- Roachdale (partial)

=== Unincorporated towns ===
- Barnard at 39.8486562°N 86.7005608°W
- New Maysville at 39.7906015°N 86.7291727°W

(This list is based on USGS data and may include former settlements.)
