= Heritage Lake, Indiana =

- Census-designated place
- Location of Heritage Lake in Putnam County, Indiana.
- Coordinates: 39°44′10″N 86°42′22″W
- Country: United States
- State: Indiana
- County: Putnam
- Township: Floyd

Area
  - Total: 3.48 sq mi (9.02 km^{2})
  - Land: 3.01 sq mi (7.80 km^{2})
  - Water: 0.47 sq mi (1.22 km^{2})
- Elevation: 850 ft (260 m)

Population (2020)
  - Total: 3,012
  - Density: 999.9/sq mi (386.05/km^{2})
- Time zone: UTC-5 (Eastern (EST))
  - Summer (DST): UTC-4 (EDT)
- ZIP code: 46121/46128
- Area code: 765
- GNIS feature ID: 2629871

Heritage Lake is an unincorporated community and census-designated place in Floyd Township, Putnam County, in the U.S. state of Indiana. As of the 2020 census, Heritage Lake had a population of 3,012. The community is located in eastern Putnam County on the shores of its namesake lake. The lake is 318 acres in size.

== Geography ==
According to the U.S. Census Bureau, the community has an area of 3.481 square miles (9.02 km^{2}), of which 3.012 square miles (7.80 km^{2}) is land and 0.469 square miles (1.21 km^{2}) is water.

== Demographics ==
Historical population
Census	Pop.	Note	%±
2020	3,012		—
U.S. Decennial Census

=== 2020 census ===
As of the 2020 census, Heritage Lake had a population of 3,012. The median age was 43.0 years. 21.2% of residents were under the age of 18 and 18.8% of residents were 65 years of age or older. For every 100 females there were 100.0 males, and for every 100 females age 18 and over there were 100.2 males age 18 and over.

0.0% of residents lived in urban areas, while 100.0% lived in rural areas.

There were 1,209 households in Heritage Lake, of which 29.9% had children under the age of 18 living in them. Of all households, 65.2% were married-couple households, 15.6% were households with a male householder and no spouse or partner present, and 13.8% were households with a female householder and no spouse or partner present. About 19.6% of all households were made up of individuals and 7.8% had someone living alone who was 65 years of age or older.

There were 1,456 housing units, of which 17.0% were vacant. The homeowner vacancy rate was 0.3% and the rental vacancy rate was 7.4%.

Racial composition as of the 2020 census
Race	Number	Percent
White	2,844	94.4%
Black or African American	13	0.4%
American Indian and Alaska Native	3	0.1%
Asian	4	0.1%
Native Hawaiian and Other Pacific Islander	3	0.1%
Some other race	9	0.3%
Two or more races	136	4.5%
Hispanic or Latino (of any race)	50	1.7%
