= Morton, Indiana =

- Unincorporated community
- Location within the state of Indiana Morton (the United States)
- Coordinates: 39°45′47″N 86°56′11″W
- Country: United States
- State: Indiana
- County: Putnam
- Township: Clinton
- Elevation: 869 ft (265 m)
- Time zone: UTC-5 (Eastern (EST))
  - Summer (DST): UTC-4 (EDT)
- ZIP code: 46135
- Area code: 765
- GNIS feature ID: 439474

Morton is a small unincorporated community in Clinton Township, Putnam County, in the U.S. state of Indiana.

== History ==
A post office was established at Morton in 1857, and remained in operation until it was discontinued in 1905.

== Geography ==
Morton is located half-way between Danville and Montezuma along US 36.
