= Groveland, Indiana =

- Unincorporated community and Census-designated place
- Location within Indiana Location within the United States
- Coordinates: 39°45′45″N 86°43′23″W
- Country: United States
- State: Indiana
- County: Putnam
- Township: Floyd
- Elevation: 876 ft (267 m)
- Time zone: UTC-5 (Eastern (EST))
  - Summer (DST): UTC-4 (EDT)
- ZIP code: 46105
- Area code: 765
- GNIS feature ID: 2830506

Groveland is an unincorporated community in Floyd Township, Putnam County, in the U.S. state of Indiana.

== History ==
Groveland was laid out in 1854. A post office was established at Groveland in 1852, and remained in operation until it was discontinued in 1905.

== Demographics ==
The United States Census Bureau delineated Groveland as a census designated place in the 2022 American Community Survey.
