= Samuel Brown House (Roachdale, Indiana) =

Historic house in Indiana, United States

- U.S. National Register of Historic Places
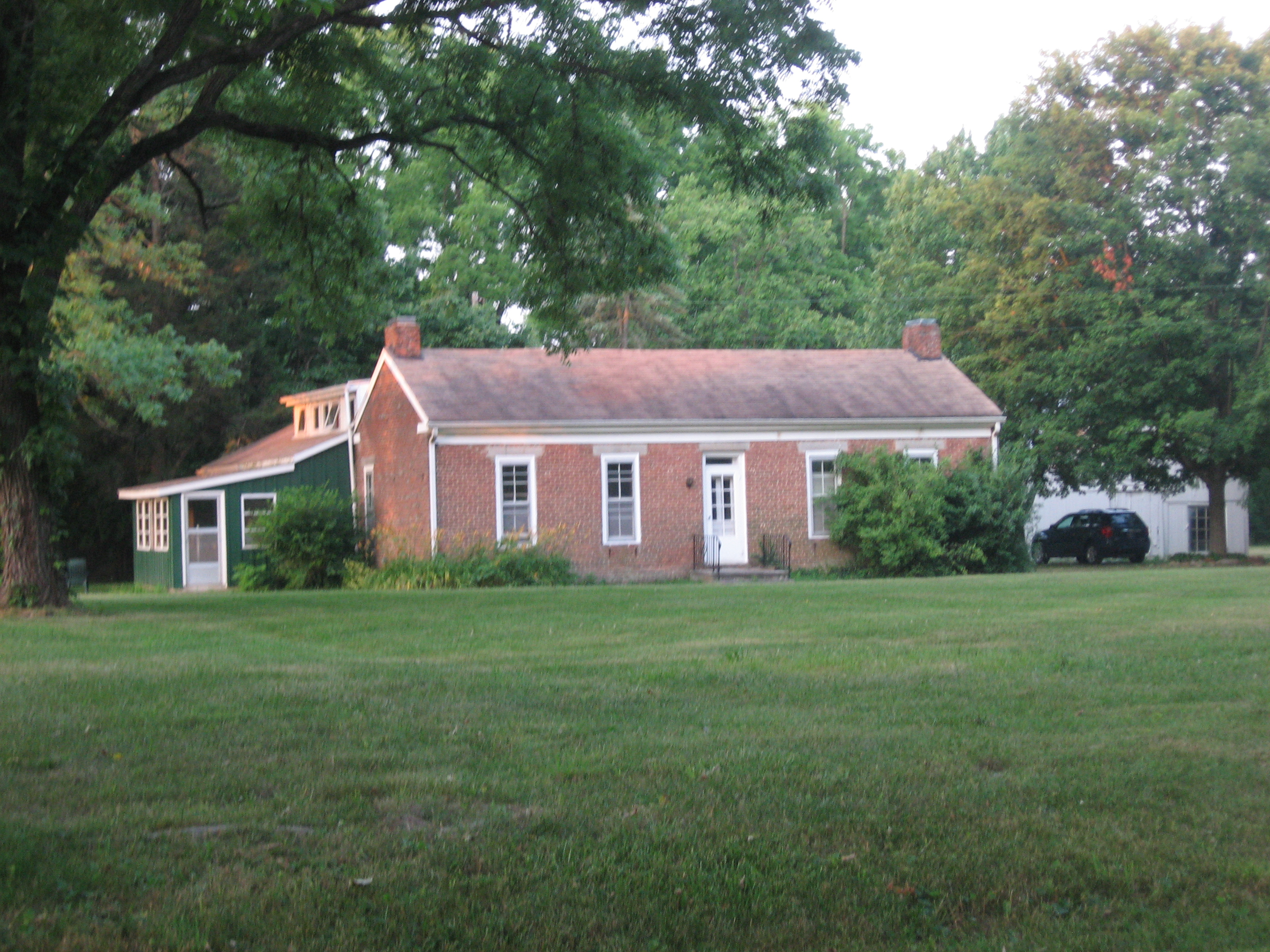
- Samuel Brown House, June 2012

- Location within Indiana Location within the United States
- Location: 1558 E. County Road 1100N, southwest of Roachdale in Franklin Township, Putnam County, Indiana
- Coordinates: 39°49′12″N 86°49′12″W
- Area: 2 acres (0.81 ha)
- Built: c. 1841
- Architectural style: Greek Revival
- NRHP reference No.: 06000520
- Added to NRHP: June 21, 2006

Samuel Brown House, also known as The Brick, is a historic home located in Franklin Township, Putnam County, Indiana. It was built about 1841, and is a one-story, "L"-plan, Greek Revival style brick dwelling. Also on the property is a contributing 19th century barn / granary.

It was listed on the National Register of Historic Places in 2006.
