= Barnard, Indiana =

- Unincorporated community
- Location within Indiana Location within the United States
- Coordinates: 39°50′55″N 86°42′02″W
- Country: United States
- State: Indiana
- County: Putnam
- Township: Jackson
- Elevation: 902 ft (275 m)
- Time zone: UTC-5 (Eastern (EST))
  - Summer (DST): UTC-4 (EDT)
- ZIP code: 46172
- Area code: 765
- GNIS feature ID: 430495

Barnard is an unincorporated community in Jackson Township, Putnam County, in the U.S. state of Indiana.

== History ==
Barnard was originally called Fort Red, and under the latter name was laid out in 1876. The present name is for Calvin Barnard, the original owner of the town site. A post office was established at Fort Red in 1876, the name was changed to Barnard in 1880, and the post office closed in 1912.
