= Marion Township, Putnam County, Indiana =

Marion Township
- Township
- Coordinates: 39°38′22″N 86°44′30″W
- Country: United States
- State: Indiana
- County: Putnam

Government
  - Type: Indiana township

Area
  - Total: 34.14 sq mi (88.4 km^{2})
  - Land: 34.11 sq mi (88.3 km^{2})
  - Water: 0.03 sq mi (0.078 km^{2})
- Elevation: 820 ft (250 m)

Population (2020)
  - Total: 1,890
  - Density: 55.4/sq mi (21.4/km^{2})
- Time zone: UTC-5 (Eastern (EST))
  - Summer (DST): UTC-4 (EDT)
- Area code: 765
- FIPS code: 18-47034
- GNIS feature ID: 453612

Marion Township is one of thirteen townships in Putnam County, Indiana. As of the 2020 census, its population was 1,890 (up from 1,794 at 2010) and it contained 790 housing units.

== Geography ==
According to the 2010 census, the township has a total area of 34.14 square miles (88.4 km^{2}), of which 34.11 square miles (88.3 km^{2}) (or 99.91%) is land and 0.03 square miles (0.078 km^{2}) (or 0.09%) is water.

=== Cities and towns ===
- Fillmore

=== Unincorporated towns ===
- Mount Meridian at 39.6019909°N 86.7575069°W

(This list is based on USGS data and may include former settlements.)
