= Clinton Falls, Indiana =

Unincorporated community in Indiana, United States

- Unincorporated community
- Location within Indiana Location within the United States
- Coordinates: 39°43′09″N 86°57′50″W
- Country: United States
- State: Indiana
- County: Putnam
- Township: Clinton
- Elevation: 742 ft (226 m)
- Time zone: UTC-5 (Eastern (EST))
  - Summer (DST): UTC-4 (EDT)
- ZIP code: 46135
- Area code: 765
- GNIS feature ID: 432677

Clinton Falls is an unincorporated community in Clinton Township, Putnam County, in the U.S. state of Indiana.

== History ==
A post office was established at Clinton Falls in 1874, and remained in operation until it was discontinued in 1901. The community was named for rapids by the town site in Clinton Township.
