= Fillmore, Indiana =

- Town
- Location of Fillmore in Putnam County, Indiana.
- Coordinates: 39°40′12″N 86°45′03″W
- Country: United States
- State: Indiana
- County: Putnam
- Township: Marion

Area
  - Total: 1.95 sq mi (5.05 km^{2})
  - Land: 1.95 sq mi (5.05 km^{2})
  - Water: 0 sq mi (0.00 km^{2})
- Elevation: 840 ft (260 m)

Population (2020)
  - Total: 532
  - Density: 273.0/sq mi (105.42/km^{2})
- Time zone: UTC-5 (EST)
  - Summer (DST): UTC-5 (EST)
- ZIP code: 46128
- Area code: 765
- FIPS code: 18-23188
- GNIS feature ID: 2396938
- Website: fillmoreindiana.com

Fillmore is a town in Marion Township, Putnam County, in the U.S. state of Indiana. The population was 532 at the 2020 census.

The town is part of the South Putnam Community Schools school district.

== History ==
An old variant name of the community was called Nicholsonville. A post office was established under this name in 1849, and was renamed to Fillmore in 1861, where it is still currently operating.

== Geography ==
According to the 2010 census, Fillmore has a total area of 1.95 square miles (5.05 km^{2}), all land.

Fillmore lies between east–west highways US Route 36 and US Route 40 and east of north–south highway US Route 231.

== Demographics ==
Historical population
Census	Pop.	Note	%±
1880	180		—
1990	497		—
2000	545		9.7%
2010	533		−2.2%
2020	532		−0.2%
U.S. Decennial Census

=== 2010 census ===
As of the census of 2010, there were 533 people, 194 households, and 142 families living in the town. The population density was 273.3 inhabitants per square mile (105.5/km^{2}). There were 225 housing units at an average density of 115.4 per square mile (44.6/km^{2}). The racial makeup of the town was 97.0% White, 0.6% African American, 0.2% Native American, 0.6% Asian, 0.6% from other races, and 1.1% from two or more races. Hispanic or Latino of any race were 5.3% of the population.

There were 194 households, of which 42.3% had children under the age of 18 living with them, 55.7% were married couples living together, 11.9% had a female householder with no husband present, 5.7% had a male householder with no wife present, and 26.8% were non-families. 22.2% of all households were made up of individuals, and 7.7% had someone living alone who was 65 years of age or older. The average household size was 2.75 and the average family size was 3.23.

The median age in the town was 35.9 years. 27.6% of residents were under the age of 18; 9.2% were between the ages of 18 and 24; 26.1% were from 25 to 44; 26.9% were from 45 to 64; and 10.3% were 65 years of age or older. The gender makeup of the town was 48.6% male and 51.4% female.

=== 2000 census ===
As of the census of 2000, there were 545 people, 196 households, and 156 families living in the town. The population density was 286.4 inhabitants per square mile (110.6/km^{2}). There were 224 housing units at an average density of 117.7 per square mile (45.4/km^{2}). The racial makeup of the town was 98.17% White, 0.18% African American, 1.28% Native American, 0.18% Asian, and 0.18% from two or more races. Hispanic or Latino of any race were 1.47% of the population.

There were 196 households, out of which 44.4% had children under the age of 18 living with them, 66.3% were married couples living together, 7.1% had a female householder with no husband present, and 20.4% were non-families. 18.4% of all households were made up of individuals, and 11.2% had someone living alone who was 65 years of age or older. The average household size was 2.78 and the average family size was 3.14.

In the town, the population was spread out, with 32.3% under the age of 18, 6.8% from 18 to 24, 30.6% from 25 to 44, 18.5% from 45 to 64, and 11.7% who were 65 years of age or older. The median age was 32 years. For every 100 females, there were 94.6 males. For every 100 females age 18 and over, there were 105.0 males.

The median income for a household in the town was $38,269, and the median income for a family was $40,568. Males had a median income of $27,404 versus $21,875 for females. The per capita income for the town was $13,514. About 5.2% of families and 8.0% of the population were below the poverty line, including 11.2% of those under age 18 and 3.4% of those age 65 or over.
