= Belle Union, Indiana =

- Unincorporated community
- Location within Indiana Location within the United States
- Coordinates: 39°34′23″N 86°42′22″W
- Country: United States
- State: Indiana
- County: Putnam
- Township: Jefferson
- Elevation: 791 ft (241 m)
- Time zone: UTC-5 (Eastern (EST))
  - Summer (DST): UTC-4 (EDT)
- ZIP code: 46121
- Area code: 765
- GNIS feature ID: 430776

Belle Union is an unincorporated community in Jefferson Township, Putnam County, in the U.S. state of Indiana.

== History ==
A post office was established at Belle Union in 1870, and remained in operation until it was discontinued in 1906. The name may be an amalgamation of the Bell family of settlers and the nearby Union Valley Baptist Church.
