= Blakesburg, Indiana =

- Unincorporated community
- Location within Indiana Location within the United States
- Coordinates: 39°48′26″N 86°54′36″W
- Country: United States
- State: Indiana
- County: Putnam
- Township: Russell
- Elevation: 784 ft (239 m)
- Time zone: UTC-5 (Eastern (EST))
  - Summer (DST): UTC-4 (EDT)
- ZIP code: 46172
- Area code: 765
- GNIS feature ID: 452150

Blakesburg is an unincorporated community in Russell Township, Putnam County, in the U.S. state of Indiana.

== History ==
A post office was established at Blakesburg in 1828, and remained in operation until 1839. The community was named after an early settler named Blake.
