= Putnam County, Indiana =

County in Indiana, United States

- County
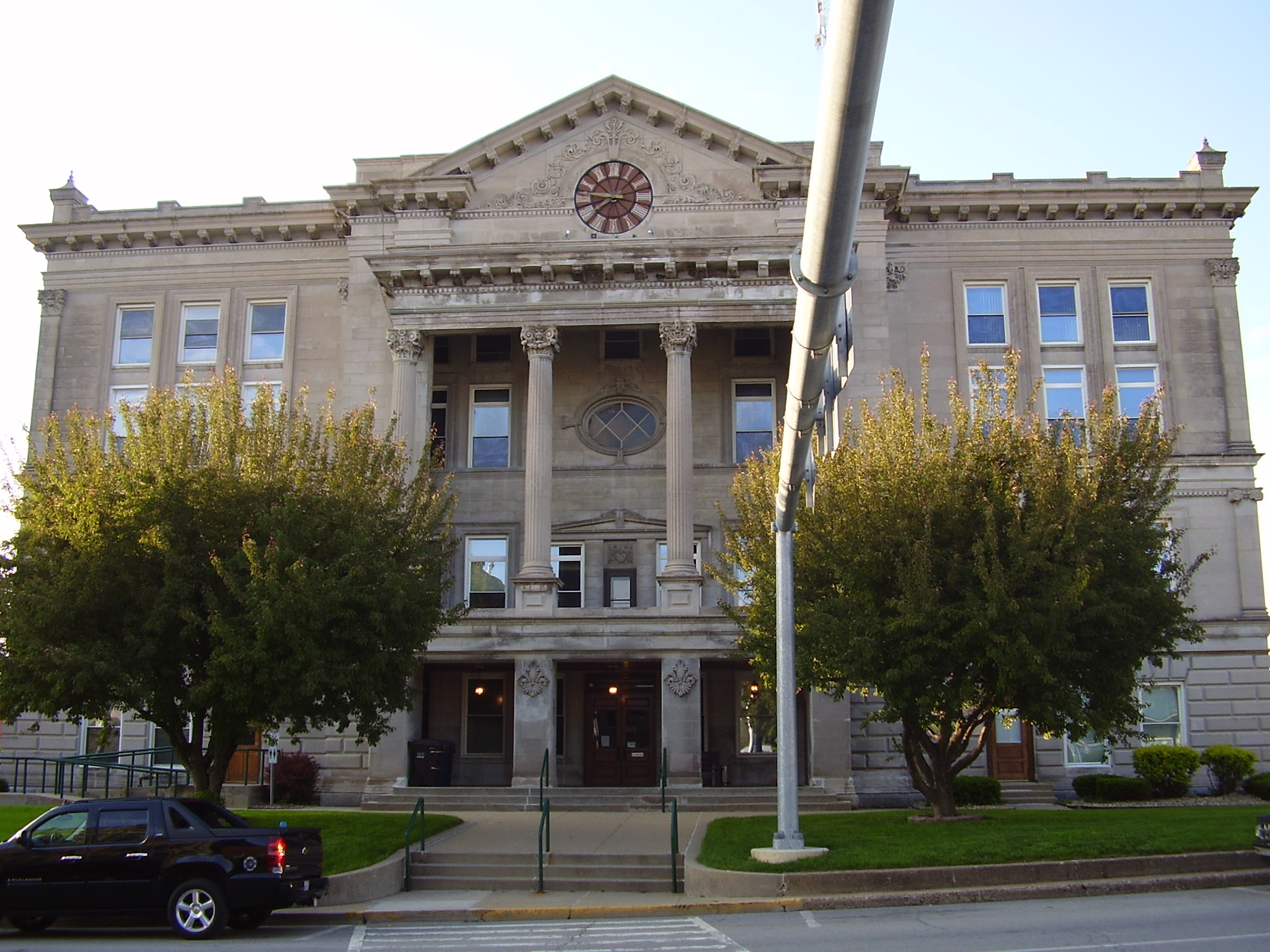
- Putnam County Courthouse in Greencastle

- Location within the U.S. state of Indiana
- Coordinates: 39°40′N 86°50′W
- Country: United States
- State: Indiana
- Founded: December 31, 1821 (created); April 1822 (organized)
- Named for: Israel Putnam
- Seat: Greencastle
- Largest city: Greencastle

Area
  - Total: 482.69 sq mi (1,250.2 km^{2})
  - Land: 480.53 sq mi (1,244.6 km^{2})
  - Water: 2.16 sq mi (5.6 km^{2}) 0.45%

Population (2020)
  - Total: 36,726
  - Estimate (2025): 37,876 ▲
  - Density: 76.428/sq mi (29.509/km^{2})
- Time zone: UTC−5 (Eastern)
  - Summer (DST): UTC−4 (EDT)
- Congressional district: 4th
- Website: co.putnam.in.us
- Indiana county number 67

Putnam County is a county located in the U.S. state of Indiana. As of the 2020 United States census, the population was 36,726. The county seat is Greencastle. The county was named for Israel Putnam, a hero in the French and Indian War and a general in the American Revolutionary War. The county was created in 1821 and organized in April 1822.

== History ==
After the American Revolutionary War established US sovereignty over the territory of the upper Midwest, the new federal government defined the Northwest Territory in 1787 which included the area of present-day Indiana. In 1800, Congress separated Ohio from the Northwest Territory, designating the rest of the land as the Indiana Territory. President Thomas Jefferson chose William Henry Harrison as the governor of the territory, and Vincennes was established as the future capital. After the Michigan Territory was separated and the Illinois Territory was formed, Indiana was reduced to its current size and geography. In late 1816, the Indiana Territory was admitted to the Union as a state, although much of its territory was still in dispute as to possession by Native Americans. The land containing Putnam County was brought into the possession and control of the United States by the Treaty of St. Mary's in 1818 (known as the New Purchase).

The first county to be organized (1790) in the Northwest Territory was Knox, covering the western part of the future state, with its territory gradually reduced as pockets of settlement allowed the creation of smaller counties. After the Indiana Territory was admitted to the Union as a state on December 11, 1816, Sullivan (December 30, 1816), Vigo (January 21, 1818), and Daviess (February 2, 1818) counties were created, followed by Owen County on December 21, 1818. By 1821, the northern parts of Owen and Vigo counties were sufficiently settled to allow the creation of a new county, which was authorized on December 21, 1821, by an act of the Indiana General Assembly. The act tasked five commissioners to meet in May 1822 at the home of James Athey, a log cabin located at the forks of the Eel River. The act also authorized a circuit court to meet at Athey's cabin, which was likely the first such log structure in the county (having been built by the fall of 1818 on a small section of the southwest corner of what became Putnam County, located just south of land encompassed by the 1818 Treaty of St. Mary's). Records show the court met in session at Athey's cabin in June 1822 and again that September, but the assigned commissioners failed to accomplish their task of selecting a county seat. In January 1823, a second group of commissioners was assigned by the legislature to select the county seat by that April, which they accomplished with the designation of Greencastle, located at the geographic center of the county. An incentive was 70 acres of ground donated for the county seat at Greencastle by Ephraim and Rebecca Dukes, who conveyed the corresponding deed in September 1823.

The county's boundary was changed on February 12, 1825, when Clay County was created. It has retained its present configuration since that time.

== Geography ==
The terrain of northern Putnam County is mostly flat; rolling hills become more evident in the center and southwest portions. At the time of settlement, the county was completely tree-covered (poplar, oak, walnut, maple, beech, and hickory), but presently the flat portions have been cleared and used for agriculture; the drainage areas are still wooded. Walnut Creek drains the east central part of the county, flowing south-southwestward into Owen County. Big Walnut Creek drains the upper part of the county, flowing southwestward into Parke County, where it is captured in the Cecil M. Harden Lake. The highest point in the county (980 feet/300 meters ASL) is a gradual rise two miles (3.2 km) SW of Bainbridge.

Limestone deposits were extracted beginning in the nineteenth century, and a large iron-ore vein southwest of Cloverdale was discovered in the 1860s.

According to the 2010 census, the county has a total area of 482.69 square miles (1,250.2 km^{2}), of which 480.53 square miles (1,244.6 km^{2}) (or 99.55%) is land and 2.16 square miles (5.6 km^{2}) (or 0.45%) is water.

=== Adjacent counties ===
- Montgomery County – north
- Hendricks County – east
- Morgan County – southeast
- Owen County – south
- Clay County – southwest
- Parke County – west

=== Lakes ===
- Cagles Mill Lake (part)
- Glenn Flint Lake
- Heritage Lake

=== Protected areas ===
- DePauw University Nature Park
- Fern Cliff Nature Preserve
- Lieber State Recreation Area

=== Cities ===
- Greencastle (county seat)

=== Towns ===
- Bainbridge
- Cloverdale
- Fillmore
- Roachdale
- Russellville

=== Census-designated places ===
- Heritage Lake
- Van Bibber Lake

=== Unincorporated places ===
- Barnard
- Belle Union
- Blakesburg
- Brick Chapel
- Broad Park
- Brunerstown
- Cagle Mill
- Carpentersville
- Cary
- Clinton Falls
- Cradick Corner
- Fincastle
- Groveland
- Hirt Corner
- Jenkinsville
- Keytsville
- Limedale
- Manhattan
- Morton
- Mount Meridian
- New Maysville
- Pleasant Gardens
- Portland Mills
- Putnamville
- Raab Crossroads
- Raccoon
- Reelsville
- Vivalia

=== Townships ===
- Clinton
- Cloverdale
- Floyd
- Franklin
- Greencastle
- Jackson
- Jefferson
- Madison
- Marion
- Monroe
- Russell
- Warren
- Washington

=== Major highways ===
- Interstate 70
- U.S. Route 36
- U.S. Route 40
- U.S. Route 231
- Indiana State Road 42
- Indiana State Road 75
- Indiana State Road 236
- Indiana State Road 240
- Indiana State Road 243

== Climate and weather ==
Greencastle, Indiana

Climate chart (precipitation, max. and min. temperature)
J	F	M	A	M	J	J	A	S	O	N	D
2.4 34 18	2.5 40 22	3.6 51 32	3.8 63 42	4.8 74 52	4.3 82 61	5.1 86 65	4.2 84 63	3.3 78 56	3.1 66 44	4 52 34	3.1 39 23
- █ Average max. and min. temperatures in °F
- █ Precipitation totals in inches
- Source: The Weather Channel
Metric conversion
J	F	M	A	M	J	J	A	S	O	N	D
61 1 −8	64 4 −6	92 11 0	97 17 6	121 23 11	110 28 16	131 30 18	107 29 17	83 26 13	79 19 7	101 11 1	78 4 −5
- █ Average max. and min. temperatures in °C
- █ Precipitation totals in mm

In recent years, average temperatures in Greencastle have ranged from a low of 18 °F (−8 °C) in January to a high of 86 °F (30 °C) in July, although a record low of −23 °F (−31 °C) was recorded in January 1985 and a record high of 107 °F (42 °C) was recorded in July 1954. Average monthly precipitation ranged from 2.40 inches (61 mm) in January to 5.14 inches (131 mm) in July.

== Government ==
The county government is a constitutional body and is granted specific powers by the Constitution of Indiana, and by the Indiana Code.

County Council: The legislative branch of the county government; controls spending and revenue collection in the county. Representatives are elected to four-year terms from county districts. They set salaries, the annual budget, and special spending. The council has limited authority to impose local taxes, in the form of an income and property tax that is subject to state-level approval, excise taxes, and service taxes.

Board of Commissioners: The executive body of the county; commissioners are elected county-wide to staggered four-year terms. One commissioner serves as president. The commissioners execute acts legislated by the council, collect revenue, and manage the county government.

Court:

County Officials: The county has other elected offices, including sheriff, coroner, auditor, treasurer, recorder, surveyor, and circuit court clerk. These officers are elected to four-year terms. Members elected to county government positions are required to declare party affiliations and to be residents of the county. The current Putnam County Jail was built in 1995 for $5.6 million.

United States presidential election results for Putnam County, Indiana
Year	Republican		Democratic		Third party(ies)	
Year	No.	%	No.	%	No.	%
1888	2,570	45.12%	3,016	52.95%	110	1.93%
1892	2,289	42.35%	2,754	50.95%	362	6.70%
1896	2,622	44.37%	3,218	54.46%	69	1.17%
1900	2,632	43.51%	3,251	53.74%	166	2.74%
1904	2,586	44.36%	3,005	51.54%	239	4.10%
1908	2,626	44.31%	3,131	52.83%	169	2.85%
1912	1,354	24.42%	2,922	52.70%	1,269	22.89%
1916	2,453	43.28%	2,965	52.31%	250	4.41%
1920	5,140	47.83%	5,417	50.41%	189	1.76%
1924	4,930	49.14%	4,759	47.44%	343	3.42%
1928	5,351	55.72%	4,177	43.50%	75	0.78%
1932	4,438	40.46%	6,168	56.24%	362	3.30%
1936	4,961	44.27%	6,177	55.12%	69	0.62%
1940	5,832	49.00%	6,020	50.58%	49	0.41%
1944	5,386	52.38%	4,857	47.23%	40	0.39%
1948	5,072	50.91%	4,814	48.32%	77	0.77%
1952	6,632	59.65%	4,446	39.99%	40	0.36%
1956	6,684	59.26%	4,572	40.53%	24	0.21%
1960	6,583	57.63%	4,798	42.00%	42	0.37%
1964	5,331	45.84%	6,275	53.96%	24	0.21%
1968	5,873	51.47%	3,692	32.36%	1,845	16.17%
1972	7,879	70.08%	3,339	29.70%	25	0.22%
1976	6,063	53.67%	5,116	45.29%	118	1.04%
1980	7,090	60.35%	3,996	34.01%	662	5.64%
1984	7,820	69.38%	3,392	30.09%	60	0.53%
1988	7,119	64.59%	3,850	34.93%	52	0.47%
1992	5,341	44.33%	3,487	28.94%	3,220	26.73%
1996	5,958	51.29%	3,962	34.11%	1,696	14.60%
2000	7,352	61.93%	4,123	34.73%	396	3.34%
2004	8,908	67.81%	4,103	31.23%	125	0.95%
2008	8,086	55.10%	6,334	43.16%	255	1.74%
2012	9,005	65.12%	4,507	32.59%	317	2.29%
2016	10,637	71.78%	3,356	22.65%	825	5.57%
2020	12,278	73.86%	3,946	23.74%	399	2.40%
2024	12,566	74.95%	3,871	23.09%	329	1.96%

== Demographics ==
Historical population
Census	Pop.	Note	%±
1830	8,262		—
1840	16,843		103.9%
1850	18,615		10.5%
1860	20,681		11.1%
1870	21,514		4.0%
1880	22,501		4.6%
1890	22,335		−0.7%
1900	21,478		−3.8%
1910	20,520		−4.5%
1920	19,880		−3.1%
1930	20,448		2.9%
1940	20,839		1.9%
1950	22,950		10.1%
1960	24,927		8.6%
1970	26,932		8.0%
1980	29,163		8.3%
1990	30,315		4.0%
2000	36,019		18.8%
2010	37,963		5.4%
2020	36,726		−3.3%
2025 (est.)	37,876	▲	3.1%
US Decennial Census; 1790-1960 1900-1990; 1990-2000 2010

=== Racial and ethnic composition ===
Putnam County, Indiana – Racial and ethnic composition Note: the US Census treats Hispanic/Latino as an ethnic category. This table excludes Latinos from the racial categories and assigns them to a separate category. Hispanics/Latinos may be of any race.
Race / Ethnicity (NH = Non-Hispanic)	Pop 1980	Pop 1990	Pop 2000	Pop 2010	Pop 2020	% 1980	% 1990	% 2000	% 2010	% 2020
White alone (NH)	28,464	29,089	33,972	35,128	33,150	97.60%	95.96%	94.32%	92.53%	90.26%
Black or African American alone (NH)	428	813	1,044	1,485	1,024	1.47%	2.68%	2.90%	3.91%	2.79%
Native American or Alaska Native alone (NH)	36	71	102	90	70	0.12%	0.23%	0.28%	0.24%	0.19%
Asian alone (NH)	68	152	185	273	355	0.23%	0.50%	0.51%	0.72%	0.97%
Native Hawaiian or Pacific Islander alone (NH)	x	x	11	10	14	x	x	0.03%	0.03%	0.04%
Other race alone (NH)	25	8	13	34	126	0.09%	0.03%	0.04%	0.09%	0.34%
Mixed race or Multiracial (NH)	x	x	280	356	1,203	x	x	0.78%	0.94%	3.28%
Hispanic or Latino (any race)	142	182	412	587	784	0.49%	0.60%	1.14%	1.55%	2.13%
Total	29,163	30,315	36,019	37,963	36,726	100.00%	100.00%	100.00%	100.00%	100.00%

=== 2020 census ===
As of the 2020 census, the county had a population of 36,726. The median age was 40.5 years. 19.5% of residents were under the age of 18 and 17.4% of residents were 65 years of age or older. For every 100 females there were 110.6 males, and for every 100 females age 18 and over there were 112.2 males age 18 and over.

The racial makeup of the county was 90.8% White, 2.8% Black or African American, 0.2% American Indian and Alaska Native, 1.0% Asian, <0.1% Native Hawaiian and Pacific Islander, 1.4% from some other race, and 3.8% from two or more races. Hispanic or Latino residents of any race comprised 2.1% of the population.

27.7% of residents lived in urban areas, while 72.3% lived in rural areas.

There were 13,404 households in the county, of which 28.8% had children under the age of 18 living in them. Of all households, 52.9% were married-couple households, 17.7% were households with a male householder and no spouse or partner present, and 21.9% were households with a female householder and no spouse or partner present. About 26.1% of all households were made up of individuals and 12.1% had someone living alone who was 65 years of age or older.

There were 14,946 housing units, of which 10.3% were vacant. Among occupied housing units, 76.9% were owner-occupied and 23.1% were renter-occupied. The homeowner vacancy rate was 1.1% and the rental vacancy rate was 5.7%.

=== 2010 census ===
As of the 2010 United States census, there were 37,963 people, 12,917 households, and 9,256 families in the county. The population density was 79.0 inhabitants per square mile (30.5/km^{2}). There were 14,706 housing units at an average density of 30.6 per square mile (11.8/km^{2}). The racial makeup of the county was 93.4% white, 4.0% black or African American, 0.7% Asian, 0.3% American Indian, 0.5% from other races, and 1.1% from two or more races. Those of Hispanic or Latino origin made up 1.5% of the population. In terms of ancestry, 23.6% were German, 15.3% were American, 12.7% were Irish, and 12.6% were English.

Of the 12,917 households, 32.9% had children under the age of 18 living with them, 58.1% were married couples living together, 9.0% had a female householder with no husband present, 28.3% were non-families, and 23.9% of all households were made up of individuals. The average household size was 2.52 and the average family size was 2.96. The median age was 37.9 years.

The median income for a household in the county was $47,697 and the median income for a family was $59,354. Males had a median income of $44,615 versus $29,211 for females. The per capita income for the county was $20,441. About 7.7% of families and 10.3% of the population were below the poverty line, including 12.1% of those under age 18 and 7.7% of those age 65 or over.

== Points of interest ==
=== Big Walnut Sports Park ===
Big Walnut Sports Park began as an all-volunteer effort in 1988. In May 2014, the nearly 80-acre (32 ha) park on Greencastle's far east side was deeded to the city of Greencastle. The park offers baseball, softball, and little league fields along with soccer fields, a walking trail, picnic tables, Frisbee golf, and a new dog park.

=== Cagles Mill Lake ===
In 1952, Cagles Mill Lake was built as Indiana's first flood−control reservoir, protecting the Eel and White river watersheds. Mill Creek feeds the 1,400-acre (570 ha) lake and is home to Cataract Falls. In the 1800s, the future Lieber State Recreation Area was populated by the Miami, Shawnee, and Potawatomi. In 1809, what was left of the great Miami Indian Confederacy sold the now southern one-third of Indiana to the US government, when the 10 O'Clock Treaty Line, which passes through Lieber SRA, was laid out.

=== DePauw University Nature Park ===
The DePauw Nature Park is a 9-mile (14 km) moderately trafficked loop trail that features a lake, wildlife, and bird-watching. The trails are rated as moderate, offer a number of activity options, and are accessible year-round. Between 1917 and 1977, the site was a limestone quarry owned and operated by Hanson Aggregates. With the quarry dormant for decades, Hanson Aggregates donated 280 acres (110 ha) of the land and leased the remaining 178 acres (72 ha) to DePauw University for $1 per year for 99 years. DePauw acquired the adjacent property to increase the total size of the Nature Park to 520 acres (210 ha). DePauw commissioned Mansur Developers in 2002 to design a master plan for possible uses of the nature park. DePauw completed phase 1 of the master plan in 2004 and opened the Nature Park to the public in September 2004.

=== Fern Cliff ===
Fern Cliff and its sandstone cliffs have long been a popular Indiana refuge. Steep forested sandstone cliffs, lush wooded ravines, and a profusion of ferns and bryophytes characterize the preserve. The preserve is open for hiking, photography, and bird watching on its moderate to rugged terrain.

=== Glenn Flint Lake ===
Located in Putnam County north-northwest of Greencastle, the 371-acre (150 ha) Glenn Flint Lake is home to a relatively new population of game fish, including panfish. Lake renovation in 1995 removed large numbers of carp, so the bluegills and crappies are now doing well. The Little Walnut Creek Conservancy District owns the lake. The Indiana Department of Natural Resources Division of Fish and Wildlife (DFW) manages the fishery at Glenn Flint.

=== Greencastle People Pathways ===
People Pathways is a planning and implementation group established with the approval of the Greencastle Park Board of Commissioners. People Pathways has developed a multi-use recreation trail plan. The paths connect public spaces such as schools, parks, libraries, and community resources. Implementation of the People Pathways plan is being done in phases as opportunities develop.

=== Lincoln Park Speedway ===
Lincoln Park Speedway is located in Putnamville and features Nonwing Sprint Cars, UMP Modifieds, UMP Super Stocks, and Bombers at weekly racing events on Saturday nights.

=== Putnam Park Road Course ===
The Putnam Park Road Course is a 1.78-mile (2.86 km), 10-turn road course that opened in 1992. The facility is located 35 miles (56 km) west of Indianapolis and is open for club events and professional team testing.

=== Putnam County Playhouse ===
The Putnam County Playhouse was organized in 1961 by Greencastle residents, "to provide the people of the county and the surrounding area with the opportunity to participate in and enjoy live theatre." For the first seasons, the plays and musicals were presented in various venues around the Greencastle. For the seasons of 1981 and 1982, plays and musicals were presented on an outdoor stage with bleacher seating. By 1983, the funds had been raised to convert a larger structure, a barn built in 1918, into an intimate 220-seat theater. The Hazel Day Longden Barn Theatre had its grand opening on June 4, 1983. Past performers presented a program of scenes and songs that had been produced by the PCP in its early years. In 1993, extensive work was done on the physical plant. A fly area was added and a new workshop and costume loft were constructed. The following year, a moderate cooling system was added and posts in the auditorium were removed. In April 2000, aluminum siding was added to the barn. Most recently, the seating system was completely replaced and the theater now has 198 seats.

The Putnam County Playhouse is active from June through September, presenting two musicals and two plays. Every other year, a children's workshop play is also produced.

== Education ==
School districts include:

- Cloverdale Community Schools
- Greencastle Community School Corporation
- North Putnam Community Schools
- South Putnam Community Schools

The Greencastle district operates Greencastle High School.

== Covered bridges ==
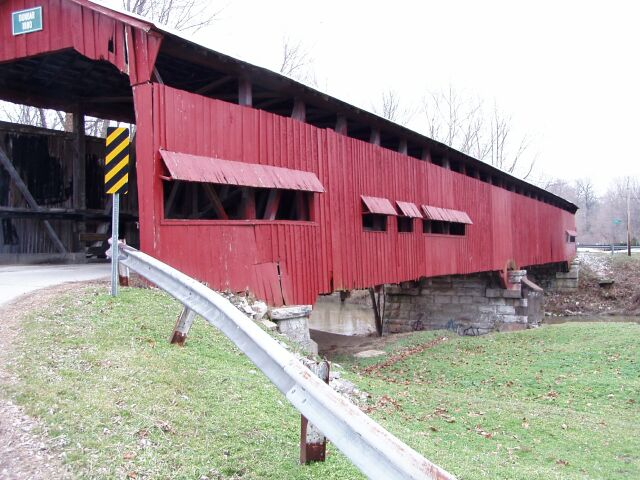
Dunbar Covered Bridge

- The Dick Huffman or Webster Covered Bridge is the furthest south, just off I-70. This route is not at an interstate exit.
- Houck Covered Bridge is south of Greencastle. Oakala Covered Bridge is just a short distance away from Houk CB.
- Edna Collins Covered Bridge is considered to be haunted according to the Encyclopedia of Haunted Indiana.
- Dunbar Covered Bridge is the nearest to Greencastle and is accessed via US 231 north, under the concrete railroad viaduct.
- Baker's Camp Covered Bridge is east of Bainbridge on old US 36.
- Rolling Stone Covered Bridge is the next parallel north of US 36.
- Rolling Stone #2 is a third covered bridge that is one parallel north of the Rolling Stone and is on gravel roads.
- Pine Bluff Covered Bridge is on a graveled road.
- Cornstalk Covered Bridge is the furthest north, east of Raccoon just off US 231. It is on a secondary road out of town to the south.

== Athletics ==
Putnam County offers many athletics:

- Indiana Smoke Softball (Indiana Smoke is headquartered in Coatesville.
- Indiana Smoke Baseball
- Putnam County Swim Team (PSCT-IN, headquartered in Greencastle)
- Athletics at the Big Walnut Sports Park (in east Greencastle).

== See also ==
- National Register of Historic Places listings in Putnam County, Indiana
- Putnam County, New York
