= Raccoon, Indiana =

- Unincorporated community
- Location within Indiana Location within the United States
- Coordinates: 39°51′22″N 86°53′47″W
- Country: United States
- State: Indiana
- County: Putnam
- Township: Franklin
- Elevation: 745 ft (227 m)
- Time zone: UTC-5 (Eastern (EST))
  - Summer (DST): UTC-4 (EDT)
- ZIP code: 46172
- Area code: 765
- GNIS feature ID: 441714

Raccoon is an unincorporated community in Franklin Township, Putnam County, in the U.S. state of Indiana.

== History ==
Raccoon was originally called Lockridge, and under the latter name was platted in 1880. A post office called Raccoon opened in 1880, and remained in operation until it was discontinued in 1934.
