= Putnam County Jail =

Jail in Indiana, United States

Coordinates: 39.633472°N 86.854697°W

The Putnam County Jail is located in Greencastle, Indiana. It houses approximately 145 adult men and women. The jail houses three categories of inmates: county inmates awaiting trial, county inmates serving sentences of less than one year, and inmates from the Indiana Department of Correction who have been placed in the jail to relieve overcrowding in state prisons.

== History ==
The original Putnam County Jail dates back to 1836 when Isaac Mahan, Wesley White and Hudson Brackney were directed to build a new jail. This jail was completed in 1840. It lasted until the early 1930s. A new jail was built under the supervision of a former superintendent of the famous Alcatraz Prison. This jail was completed in 1939 and had similar locking mechanisms to Alcatraz. It lasted until the early 1990s when Sheriff Gerry Hoffa reported that due to problems concerning overcrowding, Putnam County needed a new jail. A new 5.6 million dollar jail was constructed in December 1995.

== Administration ==
The jail is run by the Putnam County Sheriff's Office. The current sheriff is Jerrod E. Baugh. Baugh worked for 26 years as a police officer for the State of Indiana. In those 26 years: 15 of those years were field supervision in 18 counties monitoring and working with prosecutors, permit locations, and local police agencies.

Baugh was a 20-year President of the Putnam County Fraternal Order of Police. During this tenure, he Started the Shop-With-A-Cop program to bring kids and cops together. Baugh also served for 16 years as Project Coordinator and founder of the Putnam County 4H Shooting Sports Program providing safe gun handling for youth. Baugh has been serving on the county's Fair Board for over 6 years. Baugh is a Safe Schools Specialist for the Indiana Department of Education and Trainer of teachers and staff at all four area school corporations. Baugh has over 15 years on the Board of Directors for the Cloverdale Conservation Club, 12 years as lead instructor and owner for Guardian Firearms Academy providing instruction in safe handling and the defensive use of firearms to responsible gun owners and citizens of Putnam County. Baugh has taken the lead on several church safety teams with a focus on both trauma care and firearms training.

Baugh was elected Sheriff in November 2022.

== Programs ==
The Putnam County Jail offers a variety of programs. One of these is the G.E.D. program, which allows inmates to take courses and obtain their high school diploma. The jail also provides its inmates with Moral Reconation Therapy; this program is run by the local Community Corrections and helps inmates improve upon their overall decision-making skills. There is also multiple volunteer religious groups and organizations that visit with the inmates every week to help keep faith and hope to those inmates that choose this option.

== Contract with Department of Corrections ==
The Putnam County Jail works with the Department of Corrections (DOC) and takes in some of their inmates due to overcrowding problems. Although the number varies daily, there are approximately 80 DOC inmates in the jail. The DOC pays Putnam County $35 per day for every inmate they hold there.

== Methamphetamine and drug busts ==
The prevalence of drugs, primarily methamphetamine and marijuana, has resulted in huge drug busts for the Putnam County Law Enforcement. The jail is run by Putnam County Sheriff's office. This means that any money seized through drug busts is given to a drug task force to help battle this growing drug problem. Recently, huge drug busts have been made, directly resulting from the drug industry shifting more towards rural areas rather than the urban setting. On June 17, 2004, police in Putnam County seized over 149 pounds of marijuana and over $1,000 in cash from two men traveling on Interstate 70.
