= New Maysville, Indiana =

- Unincorporated community
- Location within Indiana Location within the United States
- Coordinates: 39°47′26″N 86°43′45″W
- Country: United States
- State: Indiana
- County: Putnam
- Township: Jackson
- Elevation: 929 ft (283 m)
- Time zone: UTC-5 (Eastern (EST))
  - Summer (DST): UTC-4 (EDT)
- ZIP code: 46105
- Area code: 765
- GNIS feature ID: 440085

New Maysville is an unincorporated community in Jackson Township, Putnam County, in the U.S. state of Indiana.

== History ==
New Maysville was laid out in 1832, and named after Maysville, Kentucky. A post office was established at New Maysville in 1834, and remained in operation until it was discontinued in 1919.
