= Melville F. McHaffie Farm =

- U.S. National Register of Historic Places
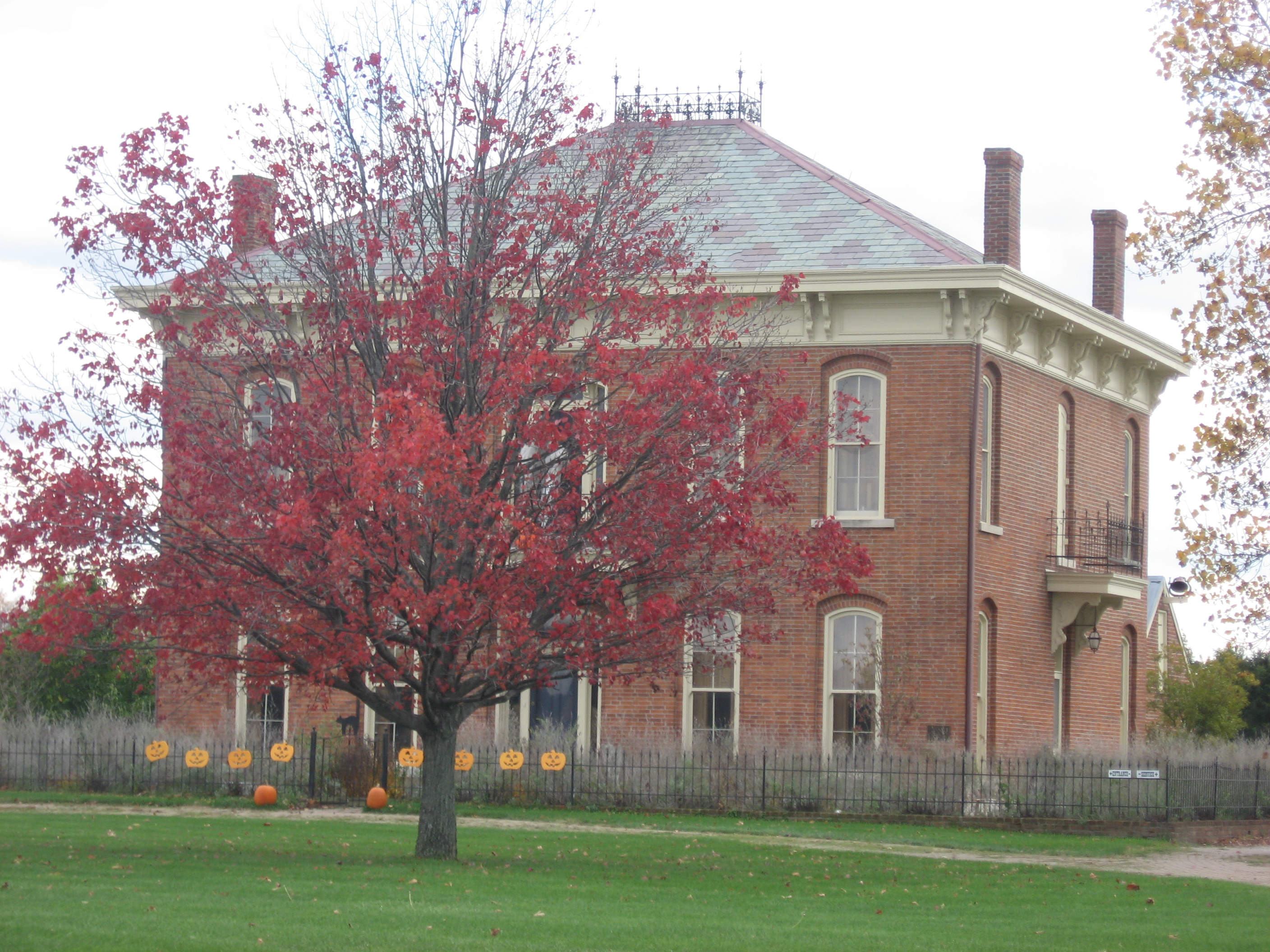
- Melville F. McHaffie Farmhouse, October 2011

- Location within Indiana Location within the United States
- Location: U.S. Route 40, southwest of Stilesville in Jefferson Township, Putnam County, Indiana
- Coordinates: 39°37′47″N 86°39′38″W
- Area: 4 acres (1.6 ha)
- Built: 1870-1872
- Architectural style: Italianate
- NRHP reference No.: 83003600
- Added to NRHP: December 22, 1983

Melville F. McHaffie Farm, also known as the Schuyler Arnold Seed Farm, is a historic home and farm located in Jefferson Township, Putnam County, Indiana, United States. The farmhouse was built between 1870 and 1872, and is a two-story, five bay by three bay, Italianate style brick dwelling. It has a hipped roof and recess arched entrance. Also on the property is a contributing two-story frame barn with a large round-arched opening.

It was listed on the National Register of Historic Places in 1983.
