= Madison Township, Putnam County, Indiana =

Madison Township
- Township
- Coordinates: 39°39′08″N 86°57′32″W
- Country: United States
- State: Indiana
- County: Putnam

Government
  - Type: Indiana township

Area
  - Total: 35.39 sq mi (91.7 km^{2})
  - Land: 35.28 sq mi (91.4 km^{2})
  - Water: 0.11 sq mi (0.28 km^{2})
- Elevation: 673 ft (205 m)

Population (2020)
  - Total: 1,105
  - Density: 31.32/sq mi (12.09/km^{2})
- Time zone: UTC-5 (Eastern (EST))
  - Summer (DST): UTC-4 (EDT)
- Area code: 765
- FIPS code: 18-46080
- GNIS feature ID: 453597

Madison Township is one of thirteen townships in Putnam County, Indiana. As of the 2020 census, its population was 1,105 (up from 1,028 at 2010) and it contained 477 housing units.

== Geography ==
According to the 2010 census, the township has a total area of 35.39 square miles (91.7 km^{2}), of which 35.28 square miles (91.4 km^{2}) (or 99.69%) is land and 0.11 square miles (0.28 km^{2}) (or 0.31%) is water.

=== Unincorporated towns ===
- Brunerstown at 39.6525440°N 86.9983456°W
- Keytsville at 39.6514327°N 87.0122347°W
- Vivalia at 39.6775439°N 87.0122345°W

(This list is based on USGS data and may include former settlements.)

== Education ==
It is in Greencastle Community School Corporation, which includes Greencastle High School.
