= Cataract Falls (Indiana) =

Waterfall in the US state of Indiana

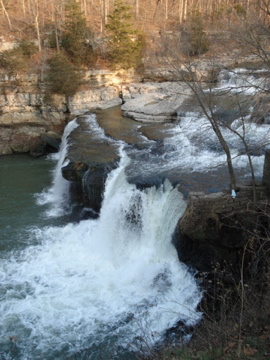
- View from side railing

- Location within Indiana
- Location: Owen County, Indiana
- Coordinates: 39°26′04″N 86°48′48″W
- Total height: 45 feet (14 m) Upper Falls; 30 feet (9.1 m) Lower Falls
- Watercourse: Mill Creek

Cataract Falls is a waterfall located in northern Owen County in the west central part of the U.S. state of Indiana. The largest waterfall by volume in the state, it is part of the Lieber State Recreation Area.

Cataract Falls consists of two sets of waterfalls on Mill Creek separated by about 1 mile (1.6 km). Both falls consist of a series of drops. The total height of the Upper Falls is approximately 45 feet (14 m), while that of the Lower Falls is about 30 feet (9.1 m).

Immediately downstream of the Lower Falls, Mill Creek enters the southern end of Cagles Mill Lake, near the towns of Cunot and Cataract. The falls are just off State Road 42 and close to State Road 243.

== See also ==
- List of waterfalls
