= Floyd Township, Putnam County, Indiana =

Floyd Township
- Township
- Coordinates: 39°43′39″N 86°44′16″W
- Country: United States
- State: Indiana
- County: Putnam

Government
  - Type: Indiana township

Area
  - Total: 34.39 sq mi (89.1 km^{2})
  - Land: 33.87 sq mi (87.7 km^{2})
  - Water: 0.51 sq mi (1.3 km^{2})
- Elevation: 863 ft (263 m)

Population (2020)
  - Total: 4,128
  - Density: 121.9/sq mi (47.06/km^{2})
- Time zone: UTC-5 (Eastern (EST))
  - Summer (DST): UTC-4 (EDT)
- Area code: 765
- FIPS code: 18-23782
- GNIS feature ID: 453298

Floyd Township is one of thirteen townships in Putnam County, Indiana. As of the 2020 census, its population was 4,128 (up from 4,011 at 2010) and it contained 1,917 housing units.

== Geography ==
According to the 2010 census, the township has a total area of 34.39 square miles (89.1 km^{2}), of which 33.87 square miles (87.7 km^{2}) (or 98.49%) is land and 0.51 square miles (1.3 km^{2}) (or 1.48%) is water.

=== Unincorporated towns ===
- Groveland at 39.7606019°N 86.7200057°W
- Heritage Lake at 39.7277900°N 86.7102200°W

(This list is based on USGS data and may include former settlements.)
