= Vivalia, Indiana =

Unincorporated community in Indiana, United States

- Unincorporated community
- Location within Indiana Location within the United States
- Coordinates: 39°40′39″N 87°00′44″W
- Country: United States
- State: Indiana
- County: Parke, Putnam
- Township: Jackson, Madison
- Elevation: 801 ft (244 m)
- Time zone: UTC-5 (Eastern (EST))
  - Summer (DST): UTC-4 (EDT)
- ZIP code: 46135
- Area code: 765
- GNIS feature ID: 445314

Vivalia is an unincorporated community in Parke and Putnam counties, in the U.S. state of Indiana.

== History ==
A post office was established at Vivalia in 1882, and remained in operation until 1905. According to Ronald L. Baker, the origin of the name Vivalia is obscure.
