= Van Bibber Lake, Indiana =

- Census-designated place
- Location of Van Bibber Lake in Putnam County, Indiana.
- Coordinates: 39°43′45″N 86°55′47″W
- Country: United States
- State: Indiana
- County: Putnam
- Township: Clinton

Area
  - Total: 0.36 sq mi (0.92 km^{2})
  - Land: 0.26 sq mi (0.67 km^{2})
  - Water: 0.097 sq mi (0.25 km^{2})
- Elevation: 807 ft (246 m)

Population (2020)
  - Total: 460
  - Density: 1,783.0/sq mi (688.42/km^{2})
- Time zone: UTC-5 (Eastern (EST))
  - Summer (DST): UTC-4 (EDT)
- ZIP code: 46135
- Area code: 765
- GNIS feature ID: 2629870

Van Bibber Lake is an unincorporated town and census-designated place in Clinton Township, Putnam County, in the U.S. state of Indiana. As of the 2020 census, Van Bibber Lake had a population of 460. The community is located on the shores of Glenn Flint Lake and its namesake lake.

== Geography ==
According to the U.S. Census Bureau, the community has an area of 0.355 square miles (0.92 km^{2}), of which 0.258 square miles (0.67 km^{2}) is land and 0.097 square miles (0.25 km^{2}) is water.

== Demographics ==
Historical population
Census	Pop.	Note	%±
2020	460		—
U.S. Decennial Census
