= James Robert Townsend =

19th-century American patent lawyer

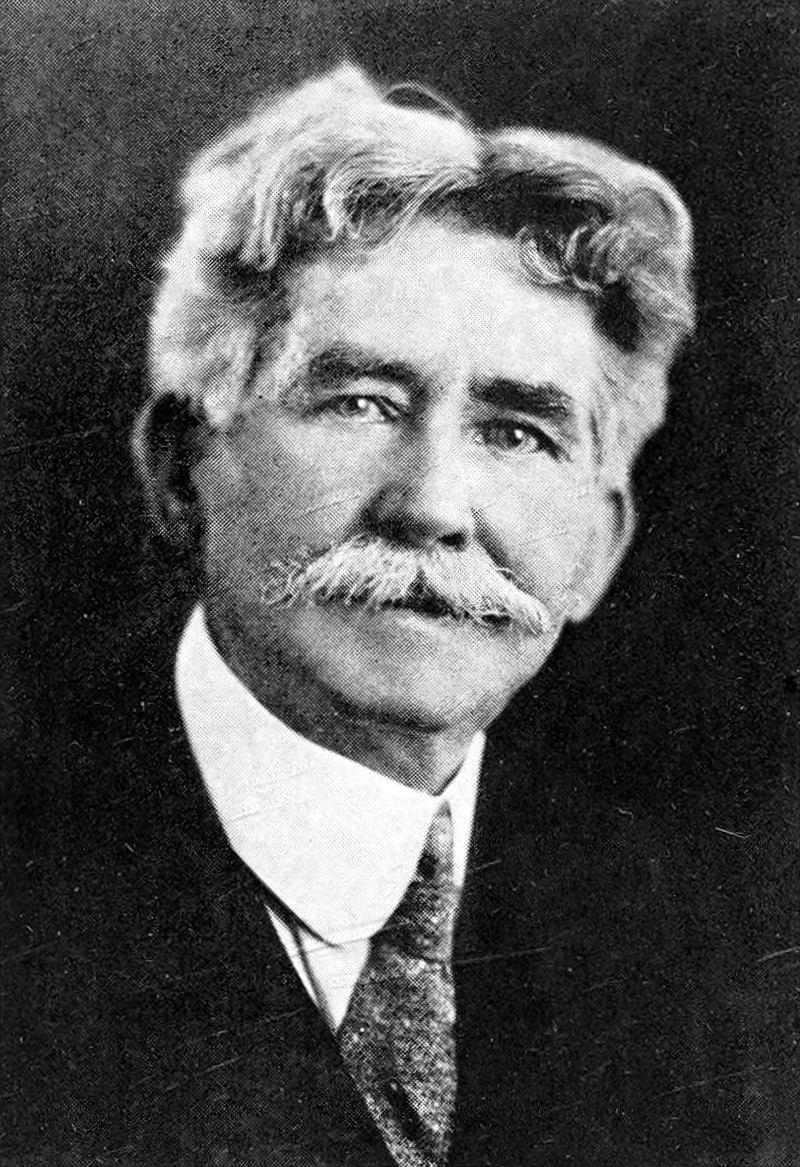
- Townsend c. 1925
- Born: September 21, 1858; Staunton, Indiana, U.S.
- Died: October 22, 1931 (aged 73); Los Angeles, California, U.S.
- Occupation: Attorney
- Political party: Socialist; Prohibition
- Spouse: M. Beulah Peauchett (m. 1906)
- Children: 3
- Relatives: James Townsend (grandfather); John Selby Townsend (uncle)

James Robert Townsend (born September 21, 1858) was an American patent attorney.

== Early life and education ==
James Robert Townsend was born to James Townsend and Julia (Somers) Townsend in Staunton, Indiana. After graduating high school, he taught in the public schools of Indiana before going on to read law under his uncle John Selby Townsend and the older Townsend's partner, Theodore Bolivar Perry.

== Career ==
Townsend began practicing law in Brazil, Indiana with the firm of Coffee & Carter. He moved to Lugonia, California in 1881 and, soon after, took up the practice of patent law, later moving his practice to Los Angeles where he eventually occupied space in the San Fernando Building. He also taught at the University of Southern California School of Law.

Townsend maintained his interest in early childhood education and, with his wife, attended Montessori Training under the supervision of Maria Montessori, becoming the first American man to study directly under the Italian education reformer.

== Politics ==
Townsend argued for women's suffrage from a young age. He unsuccessfully ran for several political offices as both a member of the Prohibition Party and of the Socialist Party of America, including California State Senate, Los Angeles School Board, Los Angeles County Council, and Los Angeles County Clerk.

== Personal life ==
Townsend was the grandson of James Townsend, a one-time enslaver who became a fervent abolitionist after having a religious experience in the early 19th century. He was married and had three children. His son, also James Townsend, was one of the original 1,000 participants in the Terman Study of the Gifted.

Townsend was an unaffiliated Christian Scientist.
