= Warren Township, Putnam County, Indiana =

Warren Township
- Township
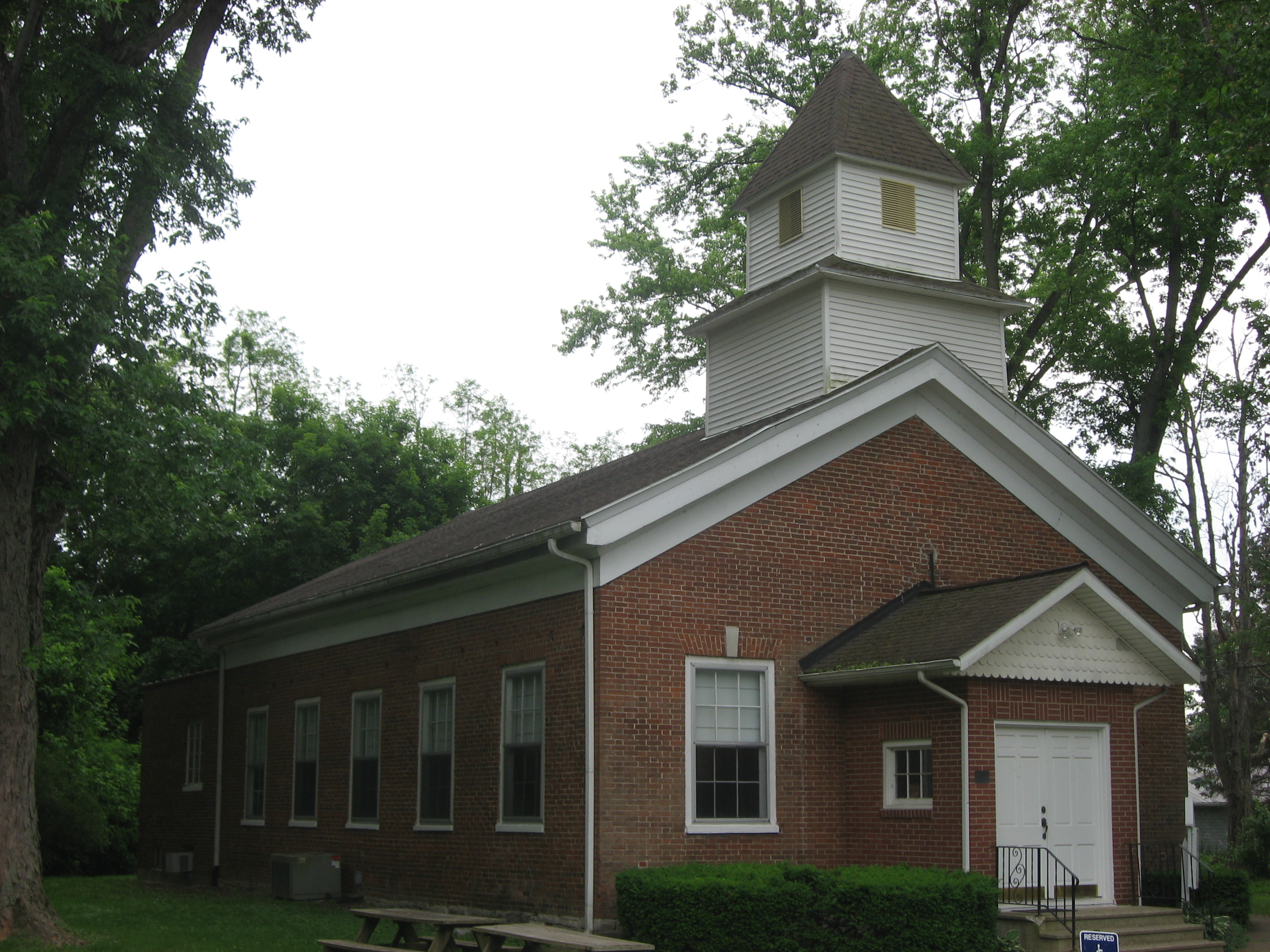
- The Putnamville United Methodist Church, a historic place in Warren Township

- Coordinates: 39°34′07″N 86°51′01″W
- Country: United States
- State: Indiana
- County: Putnam

Government
  - Type: Indiana township

Area
  - Total: 29.02 sq mi (75.2 km^{2})
  - Land: 28.98 sq mi (75.1 km^{2})
  - Water: 0.04 sq mi (0.10 km^{2})
- Elevation: 720 ft (220 m)

Population (2020)
  - Total: 3,408
  - Density: 117.6/sq mi (45.40/km^{2})
- Time zone: UTC-5 (Eastern (EST))
  - Summer (DST): UTC-4 (EDT)
- Area code: 765
- FIPS code: 18-80162
- GNIS feature ID: 453977

Warren Township is one of thirteen townships in Putnam County, Indiana. As of the 2020 census, its population was 3,408 (down from 3,929 at 2010) and it contained 552 housing units.

== History ==
The Putnamville Presbyterian Church was listed on the National Register of Historic Places in 1984.

== Geography ==
According to the 2010 census, the township has a total area of 29.02 square miles (75.2 km^{2}), of which 28.98 square miles (75.1 km^{2}) (or 99.86%) is land and 0.04 square miles (0.10 km^{2}) (or 0.14%) is water.

=== Cities and towns ===
- Cloverdale (partial)

=== Unincorporated towns ===
- Cradick Corner at 39.5439348°N 86.8058415°W
- Jenkinsville at 39.5328228°N 86.8752879°W
- Putnamville at 39.5742119°N 86.8652875°W

(This list is based on USGS data and may include former settlements.)
