= Fincastle, Indiana =

- Unincorporated community
- Location within Indiana Location within the United States
- Coordinates: 39°48′29″N 86°53′42″W
- Country: United States
- State: Indiana
- County: Putnam
- Township: Franklin
- Elevation: 814 ft (248 m)
- Time zone: UTC-5 (Eastern (EST))
  - Summer (DST): UTC-4 (EDT)
- ZIP code: 46172
- Area code: 765
- GNIS feature ID: 434481

Fincastle is an unincorporated community in Franklin Township, Putnam County, in the U.S. state of Indiana.

== History ==
Fincastle was laid out in 1838. The community's name may be derived from Fincastle, Virginia. A post office was established at Fincastle in 1847, and remained in operation until it was discontinued in 1905.
