= Broad Park, Indiana =

- former village
- Location within Indiana Location within the United States
- Coordinates: 39.590076°N 86.669196°W
- Country: United States
- State: Indiana
- County: Putnam
- Township: Jefferson
- Time zone: UTC-5 (Eastern (EST))
  - Summer (DST): UTC-4 (EDT)

Broad Park was a small unincorporated village in Putnam County, Indiana which was founded in the 1890s and had largely disappeared by at least 1960. It was located about 2.2 miles north of I-70 along S. County Rd. 1000 E.

== Village and post-office ==
The village was surveyed in 1893, and named by Edward V. Ragland. The name of the village was derived from the names of two local landowners, J. C. Broadstreet and Hugh Parker.

A post office named Broadpark was established at Broad Park in 1892, and remained in operation until it was discontinued in 1903. The population was 21 in 1920.

According to a 1962 newspaper report, Broad Park at its zenith had "about 10 houses, a blacksmith shop, two-room schoolhouse, sawmill, barbershop, general store and an establishment dealing in buggies and farm implements." But by 1962, only two houses remained at the site, with a garage was operating in the former blacksmith shop. A 1966 county history states that while Broad Park "still remains on the map", "all that is there today is a machine shop and a few other buildings".

== Namer ==
Edward V. Ragland was a teacher in Morgan and Putnam counties who had retired from teaching in 1891 to running a general merchandising business in the eastern part of Putnam. Born on February 27, 1863, in Marion Township, Hendricks County, he had moved with his parents in 1868 to Illinois for 9 years, thereafter had returned to Morgan County and lived on his parents farm until going to Indiana State Normal at Terre Haute and then had taught for 9 years.

Ragland dissolved his business partnership in Putnam after two years and moved back to Morgan County again, staying for 5 years, for 3 of which he was a postmaster. He sold up again in 1899, spent a year selling livestock in Martinsville, spent 3 1/2 years in Franklin Township, Hendricks County as a farmer, and moved to Danville in 1904.

== Eponymous landowners ==
The eponymous landowners were based in Mill Creek Township (later to become Jefferson Township).

=== John C. Broadstreet ===
John C. Broadstreet was a farmer in Mill Creek Township, born on March 3, 1859, in Putnam County. He owned a 108 acres (44 ha) farm. His parents were James and Melvina A. Broadstreet, and he and his brother Quinton were the grandsons of Thomas Broadstreet, the first settler in Washington Township, Washington County who had settled 1 mile (1.6 km) from the western edge of the Township. James, their father, was born in Putnam County after the grandfather moved there in 1825. Grandafather and father were both Missionary Baptists and farmers.

Quinton was a schoolteacher for 4 years, farmed a 450 acres (180 ha) farm, and was a Mill Creek Township trustee. In 1888 he went into the real estate, loan, and insurance business.

=== Hugh Parker ===
Hugh H. Parker was a farmer in Mill Creek Township, born on August 26, 1852, in Putnam County. He owned a 230 acres (93 ha) farm on section 17 of the Township by 1887, and later also owned 570 acres (230 ha) in section 8, extending across into Morgan County. Hugh's father and paternal grandparents, of English extraction, had come to Putnam in 1827.

William Parker, his paternal grandfather, had been the third settler in Mill Creek, with an 80 acres (32 ha) farm on section 17. William Henley Parker, his father, had been the first merchant in Mill Creek, running a store and a post-office on the family farm in partnership with his cousin Joel Wright. His maternal side was of German extraction.

Hugh's elder brother Benjamin A. Parker had a farm near to where Broad Park would later be, until 1874. His son Grover Cleveland Parker lived 0.5 miles (0.80 km) to the east of Broad Park.

Hugh Parker was connected to John Broadstreet through his February 28, 1875 marriage to Sarilda Wood, daughter of Elisha Wood. Elisha Wood in turn had married Rhoda Broadstreet, the daughter of Thomas Broadstreet, John's grandfather, on 1840-06-01.
