= Big Walnut Nature Preserve =

Protected area of Indiana

Coordinates: 39°47′30″N 86°46′58″W

The Big Walnut Preserve, also called the Big Walnut Creek Preserve, is a 2,400-acre complex of largely forested lands located in Putnam County, Indiana, near Bainbridge. Identified as a beech–maple forest with a substantial admixture of tulip poplar, the wooded land parcel complex was designated as a National Natural Landmark in 1985. The complex is co-managed by the Nature Conservancy and by the Indiana Department of Natural Resources (IDNR).

== Description ==
The Big Walnut Preserve's 2,400 acres contain many separate land parcels with disparate identities and ownerships. The Nature Conservancy manages most of the northern half of the preserve, and IDNR manages most of the southern half.

Historically an oak-hickory forest, after many generations of human fire suppression Big Walnut Preserve has moved towards a maple-beech identity. The ongoing spread of Beech bark disease further compromises this identity. The Nature Conservancy has stated that, as part of the restoration of this National Natural Landmark, they and IDNR have planted more than 125,000 seedlings of red oak, shellbark hickory, and black walnut throughout the complex.

A 1.9-mile trail and parking lot serve a 245-acre unit of the Big Walnut complex.
