= Portland Mills, Indiana =

- Unincorporated community
- Location within Indiana Location within the United States
- Coordinates: 39°46′41″N 87°00′33″W
- Country: United States
- State: Indiana
- County: Putnam
- Township: Clinton
- Elevation: 732 ft (223 m)
- Time zone: UTC-5 (Eastern (EST))
  - Summer (DST): UTC-4 (EDT)
- ZIP code: 46135
- Area code: 765
- GNIS feature ID: 441473

Portland Mills is an unincorporated community in Clinton Township, Putnam County, in the U.S. state of Indiana.

== History ==
A post office was established at Portland Mills in 1837, and remained in operation until it was discontinued in 1904.
