= Clinton Township, Putnam County, Indiana =

Clinton Township
- Township
- Coordinates: 39°44′15″N 86°56′46″W
- Country: United States
- State: Indiana
- County: Putnam

Government
  - Type: Indiana township

Area
  - Total: 35.63 sq mi (92.3 km^{2})
  - Land: 35.13 sq mi (91.0 km^{2})
  - Water: 0.5 sq mi (1.3 km^{2})
- Elevation: 827 ft (252 m)

Population (2020)
  - Total: 1,233
  - Density: 35.10/sq mi (13.55/km^{2})
- Time zone: UTC-5 (Eastern (EST))
  - Summer (DST): UTC-4 (EDT)
- Area code: 765
- FIPS code: 18-13762
- GNIS feature ID: 453233

Clinton Township is one of thirteen townships in Putnam County, Indiana. As of the 2010 census, its population was 1,233 (down from 1,275 at 2010) and it contained 847 housing units.

== Geography ==
According to the 2010 census, the township has a total area of 35.63 square miles (92.3 km^{2}), of which 35.13 square miles (91.0 km^{2}) (or 98.60%) is land and 0.5 square miles (1.3 km^{2}) (or 1.40%) is water.

=== Unincorporated towns ===
- Clinton Falls at 39.7192114°N 86.9638999°W
- Morton at 39.7631005°N 86.9363991°W
- Portland Mills at 39.7780999°N 87.0091780°W
- Van Bibber Lake at 39.7286600°N 86.9283800°W

(This list is based on USGS data and may include former settlements.)
