= Jackson Township, Owen County, Indiana =

Jackson Township
- Township
- Location in Owen County
- Coordinates: 39°26′18″N 86°53′56″W
- Country: United States
- State: Indiana
- County: Owen

Government
  - Type: Indiana township

Area
  - Total: 23.29 sq mi (60.3 km^{2})
  - Land: 21.97 sq mi (56.9 km^{2})
  - Water: 1.32 sq mi (3.4 km^{2}) 5.67%
- Elevation: 719 ft (219 m)

Population (2020)
  - Total: 1,706
  - Density: 77.65/sq mi (29.98/km^{2})
- ZIP codes: 46120, 47868
- GNIS feature ID: 453459

Jackson Township is one of thirteen townships in Owen County, Indiana, United States. As of the 2020 census, its population was 1,706 (down from 1,735 at 2010) and it contained 883 housing units.

== Geography ==
According to the 2010 census, the township has a total area of 23.29 square miles (60.3 km^{2}), of which 21.97 square miles (56.9 km^{2}) (or 94.33%) is land and 1.32 square miles (3.4 km^{2}) (or 5.67%) is water.

=== Unincorporated towns ===
- Cunot at 39.456434°N 86.854732°W

(This list is based on USGS data and may include former settlements.)

=== Lakes ===
- Barnes Lake
- Cataract Lake

=== Landmarks ===
- Richard Lieber State Park

== School districts ==
- Cloverdale Community Schools

== Political districts ==
- State House District 46
- State Senate District 37
