= Bainbridge, Indiana =

- Town
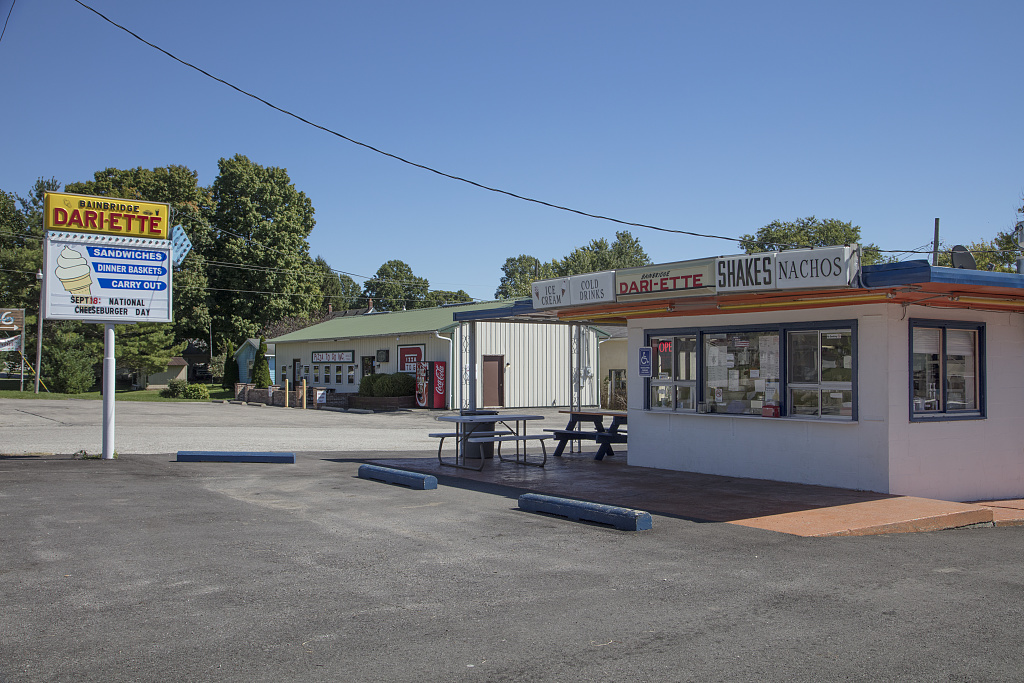
- Ice cream stand in Bainbridge

- Logo
- Motto: "Crossroads of Indiana"
- Location of Bainbridge in Putnam County, Indiana.
- Coordinates: 39°45′41″N 86°48′41″W
- Country: United States
- State: Indiana
- County: Putnam
- Township: Monroe
- Founded: 1831
- Incorporated: 1847

Area
  - Total: 0.40 sq mi (1.04 km^{2})
  - Land: 0.40 sq mi (1.04 km^{2})
  - Water: 0 sq mi (0.00 km^{2})
- Elevation: 925 ft (282 m)

Population (2020)
  - Total: 684
  - Density: 1,707.6/sq mi (659.31/km^{2})
- Time zone: UTC-5 (EST)
  - Summer (DST): UTC-5 (EST)
- ZIP code: 46105
- Area code: 765
- FIPS code: 18-03142
- GNIS ID: 2396584
- Website: www.townofbainbridge.com

Bainbridge is a town in Monroe Township, Putnam County, in the U.S. state of Indiana. The population is 684 as of the 2020 census.

== History ==
Bainbridge was laid out in 1831. This town was named after the prominent war hero of the time, William Bainbridge. A post office has been in operation at Bainbridge since 1835. The town was incorporated in 1847. The nearby National Natural Landmark of Big Walnut Creek was designated in 1985.

== Geography ==
According to the 2010 census, Bainbridge has a total area of 0.4 square miles (1.04 km^{2}), all land.

== Demographics ==
Historical population
Census	Pop.	Note	%±
1880	420		—
1890	473		12.6%
1900	431		−8.9%
1910	449		4.2%
1920	475		5.8%
1930	406		−14.5%
1940	414		2.0%
1950	455		9.9%
1960	603		32.5%
1970	703		16.6%
1980	644		−8.4%
1990	682		5.9%
2000	743		8.9%
2010	746		0.4%
2020	684		−8.3%
U.S. Decennial Census

=== 2010 census ===
As of the 2010 census, there were 746 people, 289 households, and 198 families living in the town. The population density was 1,865.0 inhabitants per square mile (720.1/km^{2}). There were 324 housing units at an average density of 810.0 per square mile (312.7/km^{2}). The racial makeup of the town was 98.1% White, 0.1% Native American, 0.4% Asian, 0.3% from other races, and 1.1% from two or more races. Hispanic or Latino of any race were 0.1% of the population.

There were 289 households, of which 36.7% had children under the age of 18 living with them, 50.9% were married couples living together, 11.4% had a female householder with no husband present, 6.2% had a male householder with no wife present, and 31.5% were non-families. 26.6% of all households were made up of individuals, and 11.1% had someone living alone who was 65 years of age or older. The average household size was 2.58 and the average family size was 3.07.

The median age in the town was 37.5 years. 28.7% of residents were under the age of 18; 6.4% were between the ages of 18 and 24; 26.6% were from 25 to 44; 26.7% were from 45 to 64; and 11.7% were 65 years of age or older. The gender makeup of the town was 49.5% male and 50.5% female.

=== 2000 census ===
As of the 2000 census, there were 743 people, 284 households, and 218 families living in the town. The population density was 1,964.9 inhabitants per square mile (758.7/km^{2}). There were 305 housing units at an average density of 806.6 per square mile (311.4/km^{2}). The racial makeup of the town was 99.06% White, 0.27% African American, 0.27% Native American and 0.40% Asian. Hispanic or Latino of any race were 0.81% of the population.

There were 284 households, out of which 39.8% had children under the age of 18 living with them, 59.2% were married couples living together, 13.7% had a female householder with no husband present, and 22.9% were non-families. 20.4% of all households were made up of individuals, and 8.1% had someone living alone who was 65 years of age or older. The average household size was 2.62 and the average family size was 3.00.

In the town, the population was spread out, with 28.0% under the age of 18, 10.0% from 18 to 24, 30.7% from 25 to 44, 19.7% from 45 to 64, and 11.7% who were 65 years of age or older. The median age was 34 years. For every 100 females, there were 92.5 males. For every 100 females age 18 and over, there were 88.4 males.

The median income for a household in the town was $36,852, and the median income for a family was $37,222. Males had a median income of $27,917 versus $21,172 for females. The per capita income for the town was $14,231. About 4.8% of families and 5.5% of the population were below the poverty line, including 7.1% of those under age 18 and 4.1% of those age 65 or over.
