= Rolling Stone Covered Bridge =

United States historic place

Coordinates: 39.7747°N 86.7842°W

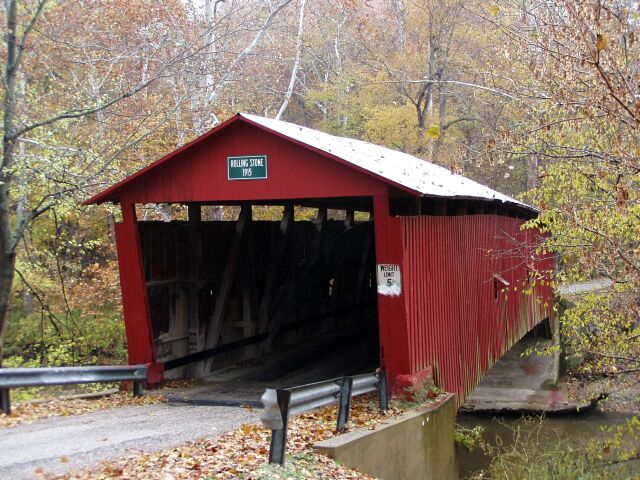

Rolling Stone Covered Bridge is a burr-arch road bridge built in 1915 over Big Walnut Creek in Indiana.

== Construction ==
This Burr Arch bridge is 103 feet (31.4m) long.

== Nearby Bridges ==
- Baker's Camp Bridge
- Pine Bluff Bridge
