= Putnamville Presbyterian Church =

Historic church in Indiana, United States

- U.S. National Register of Historic Places
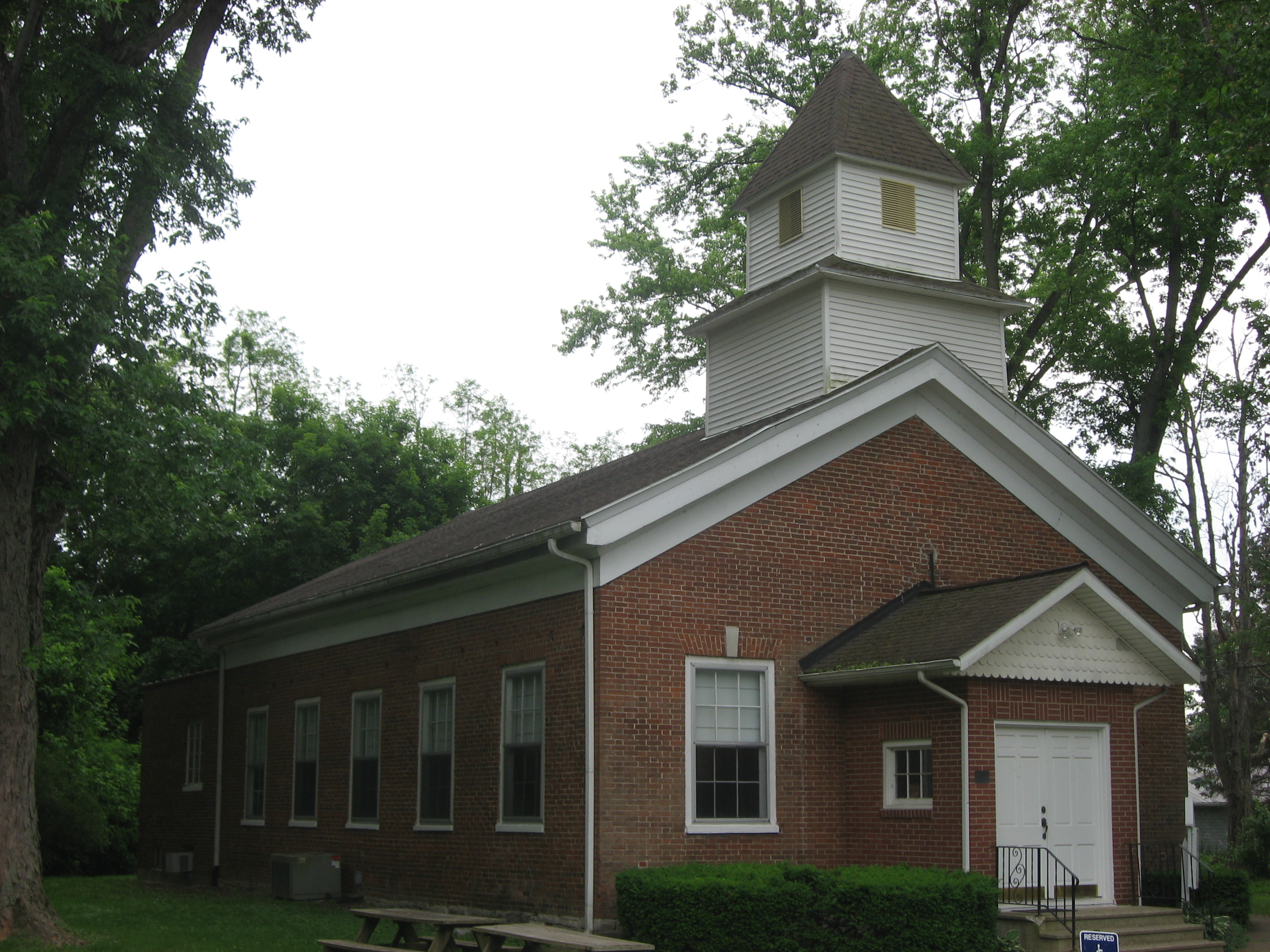

- Location within Indiana Location within the United States
- Location: IN 243, Putnamville, Indiana
- Coordinates: 39°34′25″N 86°51′54″W
- Area: less than one acre
- Built: 1834
- Architectural style: Greek Revival
- NRHP reference No.: 84001242
- Added to NRHP: March 1, 1984

Putnamville Presbyterian Church, also known as Putnamville Methodist Church, is a historic Presbyterian church on IN 243 in Putnamville, Indiana. It was built in 1834, and is a one-story, Greek Revival style brick church. A vestibule was added in 1953, and educational rooms added in 1961. The building was dedicated by the noted Presbyterian minister Henry Ward Beecher. It was sold to a Methodist congregation in 1861.

It was listed on the National Register of Historic Places in 1984.
