= John Selby Townsend =

American politician (1824–1892)

Member of the Iowa House of Representatives from the 8th district
- In office December 6, 1852 – December 3, 1854

Personal details
- Born: August 24, 1824 Morganfield, Kentucky, U.S.
- Died: April 23, 1892 (aged 67) Albia, Iowa, U.S.
- Party: Democratic
- Occupation: Judge and politician

John Selby Townsend (August 24, 1824 – April 23, 1892) was an American judge and politician. He was a member of the Democratic Party.

Townsend was born on August 24, 1824, in Morganfield, Kentucky to James Townsend a planter and large slaveholder. When Townsend was age four, his father freed all his slaves and moved with his family to Indiana. Townsend studied at Asbury University (now DePauw University) and, subsequently, taught himself law, passing the bar exam in Monroe County, Iowa.

In 1851, Townsend was elected the county attorney of Monroe County. In 1852 he was elected to the Iowa General Assembly, sitting in the House of Representatives from December 6, 1852, to December 3, 1854. From 1853 to 1863 he served as a district court judge, before going into private practice with Theodore Bolivar Perry, who had previously read law under him. He retired in 1883.

Iowa House of Representatives
Preceded by	State Representative, 8th Representative District; December 6, 1852 – December 3, 1854	Succeeded by
