= Jenkinsville, Indiana =

- town
- Location within Indiana Location within the United States
- Coordinates: 39°31′58″N 86°52′31″W
- Country: United States
- State: Indiana
- County: Putnam
- Township: Warren
- Elevation: 719 ft (219 m)
- Time zone: UTC-5 (Eastern (EST))
  - Summer (DST): UTC-4 (EDT)
- ZIP code: 46120
- Area code: 765
- GNIS feature ID: 452224

Jenkinsville was a town in Warren Township, Putnam County, Indiana that was platted but never occupied.
