= Cloverdale, Indiana =

- Town
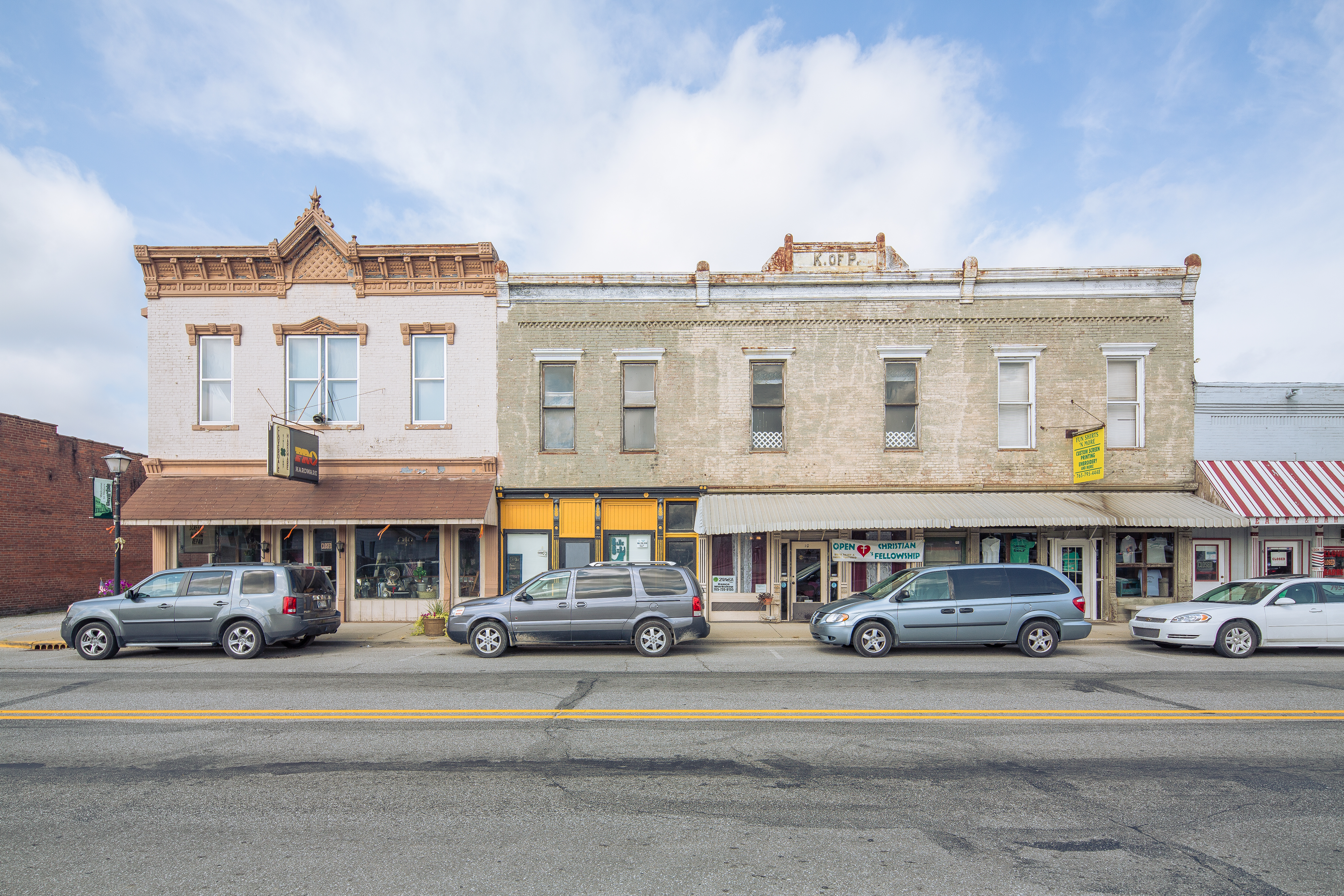

- Location of Cloverdale in Putnam County, Indiana.
- Coordinates: 39°31′16″N 86°47′59″W
- Country: United States
- State: Indiana
- County: Putnam
- Township: Cloverdale, Warren

Area
  - Total: 3.55 sq mi (9.20 km^{2})
  - Land: 3.49 sq mi (9.03 km^{2})
  - Water: 0.066 sq mi (0.17 km^{2})
- Elevation: 787 ft (240 m)

Population (2020)
  - Total: 2,060
  - Density: 590.6/sq mi (228.03/km^{2})
- Time zone: UTC-5 (EST)
  - Summer (DST): UTC-4 (EDT)
- ZIP code: 46120
- Area code: 765
- FIPS code: 18-13852
- GNIS feature ID: 2396656
- Website: townofcloverdale.in.gov

Cloverdale is a town in Cloverdale and Warren townships, Putnam County, in the U.S. state of Indiana. The population was 2060 at the 2020 census.

== History ==
Cloverdale was laid out in 1839. The town was named for the abundance of clover and dales near the original town site. A post office has been in operation at Cloverdale since 1836.

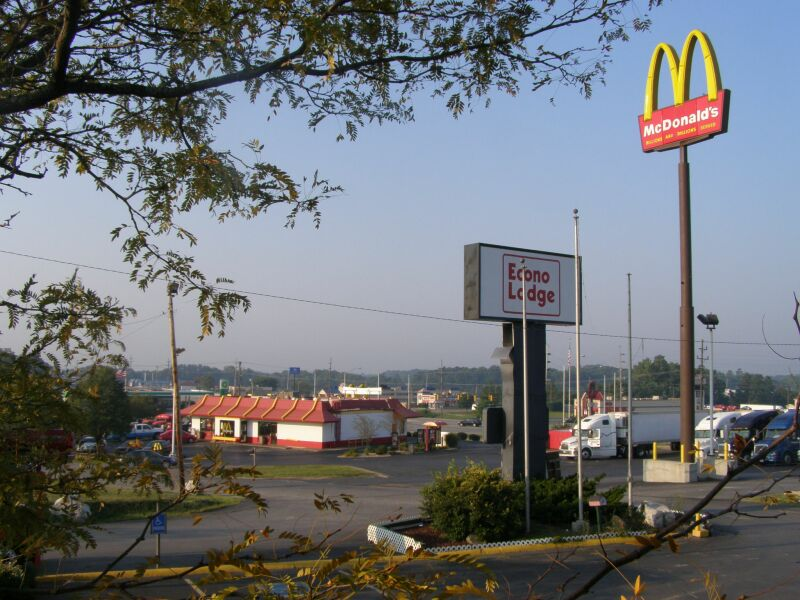
Cloverdale near the Interstate

== Geography ==
According to the 2010 census, Cloverdale has a total area of 3.52 square miles (9.12 km^{2}), of which 3.46 square miles (8.96 km^{2}) (or 98.3%) is land and 0.06 square miles (0.16 km^{2}) (or 1.7%) is water.

== Demographics ==
Historical population
Census	Pop.	Note	%±
1850	148		—
1860	318		114.9%
1870	317		−0.3%
1880	477		50.5%
1890	437		−8.4%
1900	445		1.8%
1910	624		40.2%
1920	678		8.7%
1930	627		−7.5%
1940	657		4.8%
1950	649		−1.2%
1960	741		14.2%
1970	870		17.4%
1980	1,357		56.0%
1990	1,681		23.9%
2000	2,243		33.4%
2010	2,172		−3.2%
2020	2,060		−5.2%
U.S. Decennial Census

=== 2020 census ===
As of the 2020 census, Cloverdale had a population of 2,060. The median age was 45.5 years. 19.7% of residents were under the age of 18 and 21.2% of residents were 65 years of age or older. For every 100 females there were 95.4 males, and for every 100 females age 18 and over there were 94.1 males age 18 and over.

0.0% of residents lived in urban areas, while 100.0% lived in rural areas.

There were 891 households in Cloverdale, of which 24.8% had children under the age of 18 living in them. Of all households, 44.4% were married-couple households, 20.0% were households with a male householder and no spouse or partner present, and 27.5% were households with a female householder and no spouse or partner present. About 29.4% of all households were made up of individuals and 14.7% had someone living alone who was 65 years of age or older.

There were 969 housing units, of which 8.0% were vacant. The homeowner vacancy rate was 2.5% and the rental vacancy rate was 3.1%.

Racial composition as of the 2020 census
Race	Number	Percent
White	1,925	93.4%
Black or African American	17	0.8%
American Indian and Alaska Native	8	0.4%
Asian	7	0.3%
Native Hawaiian and Other Pacific Islander	0	0.0%
Some other race	11	0.5%
Two or more races	92	4.5%
Hispanic or Latino (of any race)	28	1.4%

=== 2010 census ===
As of the census of 2010, there were 2,172 people, 885 households, and 608 families living in the town. The population density was 627.7 inhabitants per square mile (242.4/km^{2}). There were 1,001 housing units at an average density of 289.3 per square mile (111.7/km^{2}). The racial makeup of the town was 97.4% White, 0.6% African American, 0.3% Native American, 0.3% Asian, 0.2% from other races, and 1.2% from two or more races. Hispanic or Latino of any race were 0.9% of the population.

There were 885 households, of which 32.1% had children under the age of 18 living with them, 50.5% were married couples living together, 12.5% had a female householder with no husband present, 5.6% had a male householder with no wife present, and 31.3% were non-families. 27.5% of all households were made up of individuals, and 12.4% had someone living alone who was 65 years of age or older. The average household size was 2.41 and the average family size was 2.90.

The median age in the town was 42.2 years. 22.8% of residents were under the age of 18; 8.5% were between the ages of 18 and 24; 22.6% were from 25 to 44; 29.6% were from 45 to 64; and 16.5% were 65 years of age or older. The gender makeup of the town was 48.3% male and 51.7% female.

=== 2000 census ===
As of the census of 2000, there were 2,247 people, 902 households, and 614 families living in the town. The population density was 644.3 inhabitants per square mile (248.8/km^{2}). There were 960 housing units at an average density of 275.8 per square mile (106.5/km^{2}). The racial makeup of the town was 97.28% White, 0.45% African American, 0.31% Native American, 0.18% Asian, 0.04% Pacific Islander, 0.31% from other races, and 1.43% from two or more races. Hispanic or Latino of any race were 0.98% of the population.

There were 901 households, out of which 33.1% had children under the age of 18 living with them, 53.3% were married couples living together, 10.3% had a female householder with no husband present, and 31.9% were non-families. 25.9% of all households were made up of individuals, and 13.0% had someone living alone who was 65 years of age or older. The average household size was 2.49 and the average family size was 3.00.

In the town, the population was spread out, with 27.5% under the age of 18, 7.7% from 18 to 24, 27.9% from 25 to 44, 23.4% from 45 to 64, and 13.5% who were 65 years of age or older. The median age was 37 years. For every 100 females, there were 88.8 males. For every 100 females age 18 and over, there were 88.4 males.

The median income for a household in the town was $36,402, and the median income for a family was $42,917. Males had a median income of $33,561 versus $20,857 for females. The per capita income for the town was $16,982. About 4.0% of families and 7.4% of the population were below the poverty line, including 9.4% of those under age 18 and 6.2% of those age 65 or over.

== Infrastructure ==
Cloverdale is served by locally owned and based Endeavor Communications, formerly Clay County Rural Telephone Cooperative, which serves over 10,000 members. An alternative to the local phone company for internet service, PDS Wireless is locally owned an operated and serving Cloverdale and some outlying areas.
