= Indiana State Road 236 =

State highway in Indiana, United States

State Road 236
- SR 236 highlighted in red

Route information
- Maintained by INDOT
- Length: 46.779 mi (75.284 km)

Western segment
- Length: 40.662 mi (65.439 km)
- West end: US 41 near Bloomingdale
- Major intersections: US 231 in Raccoon
- East end: SR 39 in Danville

Eastern segment
- Length: 6.117 mi (9.844 km)
- West end: SR 9 in Anderson
- East end: N County Road 800 W, N 8th Street & Mill Road in Middletown

Location
- Country: United States
- State: Indiana
- Counties: Western segment: Parke, Putnam, Hendricks; Eastern segment: Madison, Henry

Highway system
- Indiana State Highway System; Interstate; US; State; Scenic
← SR 235	→ SR 237

State Road 236 in the U.S. state of Indiana exists in two sections. The western section starts at U.S. Route 41 (US 41) in Parke County, and runs eastward, paralleling its parent that lies to the south, U.S. Route 36 (US 36). In western Hendricks County it then turns to the southeast and ends at State Road 39 (SR 39), only two miles north of that road's intersection with US 36 in Danville.

The eastern portion is a 6.2-mile (10.0 km) route that connects State Road 9 (SR 9) in Anderson with Middletown in Henry Co.

== Route description ==
=== Western section ===
From the western terminus SR 236 heads east. SR 236 passes through a concurrency with State Road 59 (SR 59) that begins in Guion and heads east towards Milligan. SR 236 heads towards U.S. Route 231 (US 231). SR 236 and US 231 have a short concurrency. From US 231, heads east towards North Salem passing through Roachdale. In North Salem SR 236 has an intersection with State Road 75 (SR 75). From North Salem SR 236 turns southeast. The eastern terminus of the eastern section is at a three-way intersection.

=== Eastern section ===
From the western terminus of the eastern section at a stoplight with SR 9, SR 236 heads due east towards Middletown. SR 236 passes over Interstate 69 (I-69). SR 236 enter Middletown from the west and ends at County Road 800 West.

== History ==
The eastern section of SR 236 was State Road 67 until SR 67 became concurrent with I-69 from Anderson to Muncie.

The western section has a somewhat similar story. In 1950, US 136 was routed along what had been State Road 34 from Indianapolis through Crawfordsville to the Illinois state line. Indiana does not allow State Roads to have the same number as US highways, so it renumbered SR 136 to SR 236.

== Major intersections ==
County	Location	mi	km	Destinations	Notes
Parke	Penn–Washington township line	0.000	0.000	US 41 – Terre Haute, Hammond	Western terminus of SR 236
Parke	Guion	7.426	11.951	SR 59 south – Brazil	Western end of SR 59 concurrency
Parke	Milligan	10.058	16.187	SR 59 north – Waveland	Eastern end of SR 59 concurrency
Putnam	Franklin–Russell township line	18.469	29.723	US 231 south – Greencastle	Southern end of US 231 concurrency
Putnam	Franklin–Russell township line	18.975	30.537	US 231 north – Crawfordsville	Northern end of US 231 concurrency
Hendricks	North Salem	32.795	52.778	SR 75 – Winchester, Jamestown	
Hendricks	Center Township	40.662	65.439	SR 39 – Danville, Lizton, Lebanon	Eastern terminus of the western section of SR 236
Gap in route
Madison	Anderson	40.663	65.441	SR 9 – Pendleton, Anderson, Marion	Western terminus of the eastern section of SR 236
Henry	Middletown	46.780	75.285	Mill Street & 8th Street	Eastern terminus of SR 236
1.000 mi = 1.609 km; 1.000 km = 0.621 mi: Concurrency terminus
