= Tri-West Hendricks High School =

Public high school in Lizton, Indiana, US

Tri-West High School

Location
- 7883 North State Route 39; Lizton, Hendricks County, Indiana; United States; 39°52′36″N 86°32′31″W

Information
- Type: Public high school
- Established: 1975; 51 years ago
- School district: North West Hendricks School Corporation
- NCES School ID: 180810001387
- Principal: Mike Tricker
- Teaching staff: 32.50 (FTE)
- Grades: 9–12
- Enrollment: 608 (2023-2024)
- Student to teacher ratio: 18.71
- Campus size: 3A (IHSAA)
- Colors: Navy Blue & Metallic Gold
- Fight song: Notre Dame Victory March
- Athletics conference: Hoosier Legends
- Team name: Bruins
- Rival: Danville Community High School
- Website: www.hendricks.k12.in.us/o/twhs

Tri-West Hendricks High School, often referred to as simply Tri-West High School, is a public high school located in Lizton, Indiana. It is a part of the North West Hendricks School Corporation.

The school district includes the municipalities of Lizton, North Salem, and Pittsboro, as well as portions of Brownsburg and Jamestown.

== About ==
Tri-West Hendricks High School was constructed in 1975, with a junior high (Tri-West Middle School) later added in 1983 (a new junior high was completed in 2003, into which the 6-8 graders moved). Tri-West was formed from the consolidation of three high schools: Pittsboro, Lizton, and North Salem. This also caused the formation of the North West Hendricks School Corporation. In Pittsboro, the original gym remains as part of the elementary school. The high school was expanded and renovated between the years of 2008 to 2010. It holds grades 9-12 from the townships of Middle, Union, and Eel River. The school mascot is the Bruin. The school colors are navy blue and vegas gold. The location of the school is rural, surrounded by mainly farmland. It is not an ethnically diverse school, as the students are nearly all (96.5%) caucasian, respectively.

== Athletics ==
Tri-West offers 18 varsity sports.

State Championships
Football	1996(1A), 2003(2A), 2004(2A), 2014(3A)
Volleyball	2026 (3A)
Softball	2013 (3A)

== Notable alumni ==
- Jeff Gordon, four-time NASCAR Cup Series champion (1995, 1997, 1998, 2001), three-time Daytona 500 winner (1997, 1999, 2005), 3rd most career wins in the NASCAR Cup Series with 93, considered one of the greatest NASCAR drivers of all time.
- Peyton Hendershot, NFL tight end for the Kansas City Chiefs
- Bridget Sloan, gymnast, 2008 Olympic silver medalist, 2009 World All Around Champion
- Haley Jordan, Miss Indiana 2017, Miss Indiana USA 2023, NCAA - Selection show host, Indy Ignite Major League Volleyball - Sideline reporter, Emcee, Indiana University Men's Basketball - Emcee, Indy Fuel Hockey (ECHL affiliate of the Chicago Blackhawks and Rockford IceHogs) — Emcee, DIRTVision racing — Pit reporter, Indianapolis Indians (Triple-A affiliate of the Pittsburgh Pirates) — Pregame show host & Emcee, ESPN+ for multiple sports — Analyst, Sideline reporter

== See also ==
- List of high schools in Indiana
