= Pittsboro High School =

School in Indiana, United States

Pittsboro High School was a public high school in Pittsboro, Indiana. The school mascot was the Burro and the school colors were red and black. Currently, the elementary school and primary school in town still have the same mascot and colors today.

== History ==
In 1894, the high school was established, meeting upstairs in the Junken Building. In 1913, the school was built at the cost of around $23,000, containing both the grade school and high school. Four high school students graduated in 1914. In 1919, a gym was added on to the school by the local citizens. Due to overcrowding, the new high school was built in 1921 on North Meridian, costing $70,000. The new building was built next to the 1913 building. When the new high school was completed, the old building housed grades 1-7 and the new building contained grades 8–12. The graduating class of 1921 was eleven. The last class from the high school graduated in 1975 and the building was abandoned in 1978 before being demolished in 1981. The school was around for 82 years. After 1975, students that lived in Pittsboro, would go to Tri-West Hendricks High School instead. Currently, the elementary school in Pittsboro sits on the site of both the old grade school and high school.

== Sports ==
The high school was quite successful in sports, especially the school's boys' basketball teams. The Burro became the basketball team mascot in 1932. The boys' basketball team won seven total sectional championships during their history in 1922, 1926, 1933, 1940, 1941, 1974, and 1975. In 1974 and 1975, Coach Bill Compton led the Burros to the school's second back-to-back sectional wins in the team's history. The other back-to-back sectional titles were in 1940 and 1941.

The girls' volleyball team, led by coach Vicky Williams, also won a sectional title in 1974.

== See also ==
- Pittsboro, Indiana
- North West Hendricks School Corporation
