= Pittsboro, Indiana =

- Town
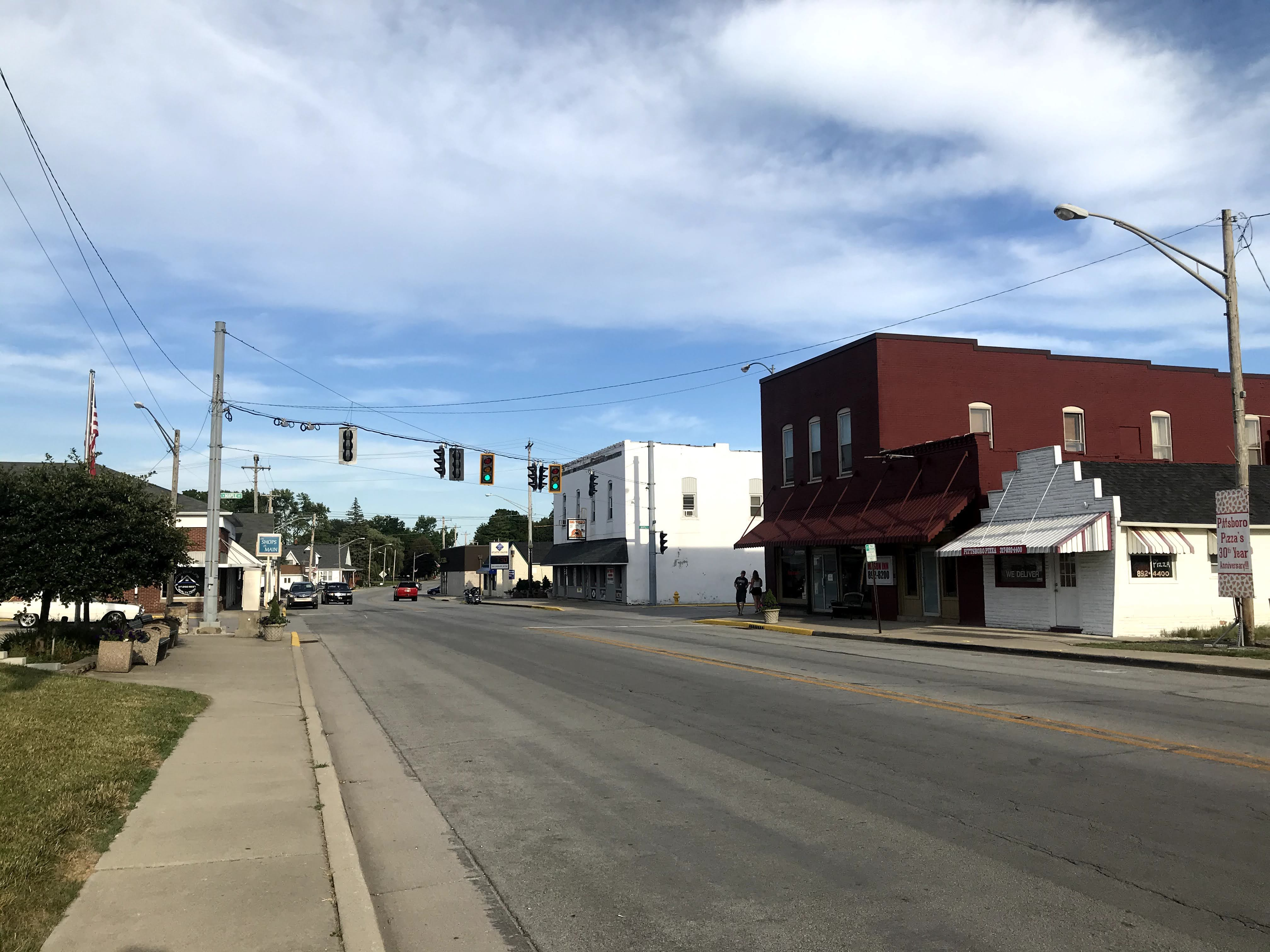
- Looking east on Main Street

- Flag Logo

- Location of Pittsboro in Hendricks County, Indiana.
- Coordinates: 39°51′50″N 86°28′01″W
- Country: United States
- State: Indiana
- County: Hendricks
- Townships: Middle, Brown
- Established: December 9, 1834
- Incorporated: 1906

Government
  - Town manager: Jason Love

Area
  - Total: 3.80 sq mi (9.83 km^{2})
  - Land: 3.78 sq mi (9.80 km^{2})
  - Water: 0.012 sq mi (0.03 km^{2})
- Elevation: 942 ft (287 m)

Population (2020)
  - Total: 3,682
  - Density: 973.5/sq mi (375.88/km^{2})
- Time zone: UTC-5 (Eastern (EST))
  - Summer (DST): UTC-4 (EDT)
- ZIP code: 46167
- Area code: 317
- FIPS code: 18-60192
- GNIS feature ID: 2396858
- Website: www.townofpittsboro.org

Pittsboro is a town in Middle and Brown townships, Hendricks County, Indiana, United States. The population was 3,682 at the 2020 census.

== History ==
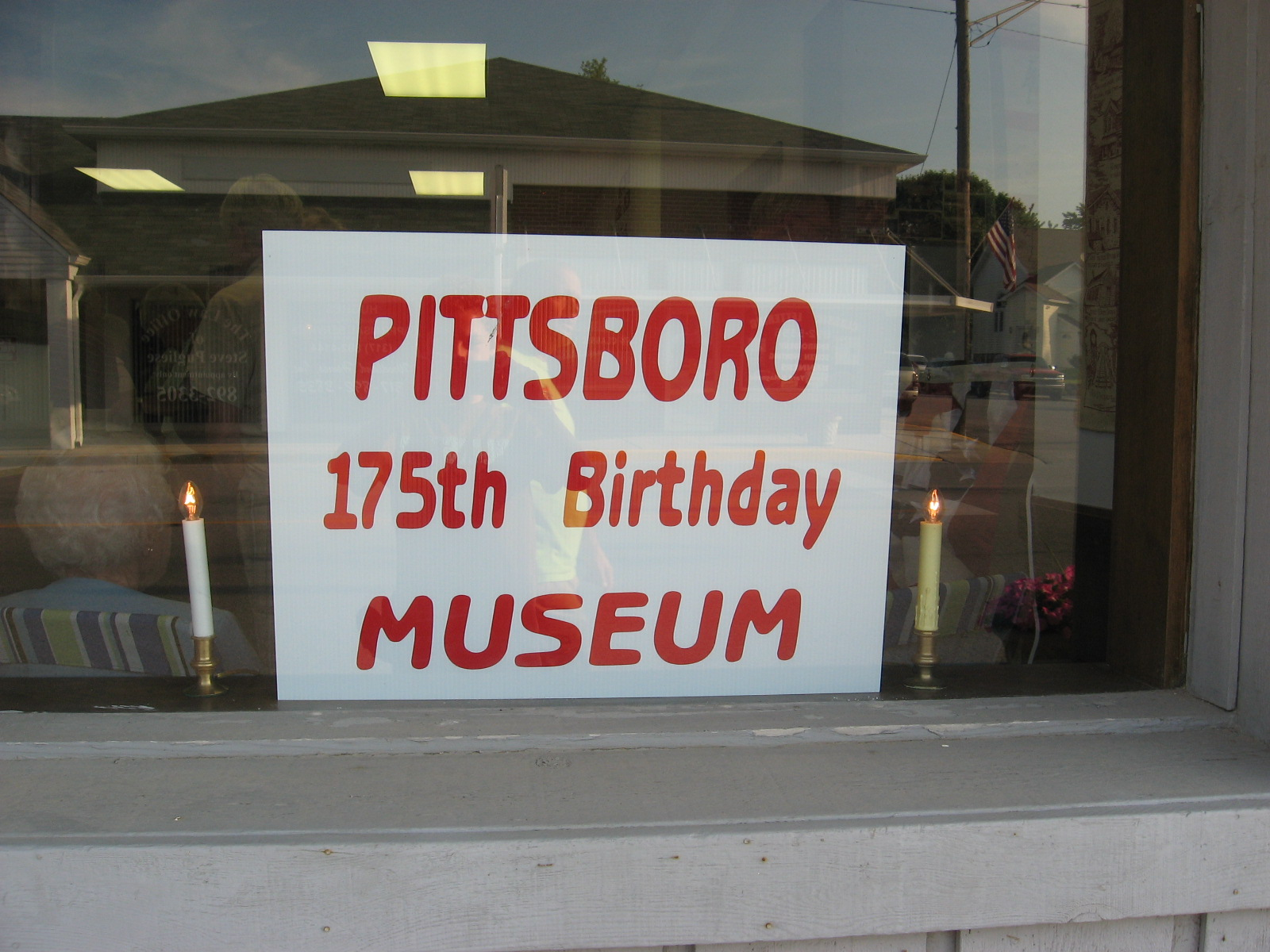
Pittsboro 175th Birthday Museum

The town of Pittsboro was founded on December 9, 1834, by Simon T. Hadley and Wiliam L. Matlock. The town was named "Pittsborough" in honor of Hadley's home in North Carolina. The spelling was later changed to "Pittsboro".

On April 6, 1906, an election was held for incorporation of the town. The result of the election was 83 favorable and 38 opposed. After incorporation came many infrastructure improvements and new services. Sidewalks were laid, street lights installed, and water service begun.

In 2008 Pittsboro had a parade for Olympic silver medalist Bridget Sloan. It led to the high school in neighboring Lizton, where she thanked her fans for supporting her. Hundreds of people had lined Main Street with signs and banners.

In 2009 Pittsboro celebrated its 175th birthday. The celebration was from June 26 through 28 and included a temporary museum of the town's history and historic signs on many of the town's buildings. The celebration also included food, activities, music, a parade, and fireworks.

== Geography ==
Pittsboro is located in northeastern Hendricks County. U.S. Route 136 is the town's Main Street, leading southeast 18 miles (29 km) to downtown Indianapolis and northwest 10 miles (16 km) to Jamestown. Interstate 74, running parallel to US-136, forms the northern border of the town, with access from Exit 61.

According to the 2010 census, Pittsboro has a total area of 2.95 square miles (7.64 km^{2}), all land.

== Demographics ==
Historical population
Census	Pop.	Note	%±
1860	148		—
1870	201		35.8%
1880	418		108.0%
1910	408		—
1920	549		34.6%
1930	489		−10.9%
1940	510		4.3%
1950	599		17.5%
1960	826		37.9%
1970	867		5.0%
1980	891		2.8%
1990	815		−8.5%
2000	1,588		94.8%
2010	2,928		84.4%
2020	3,682		25.8%
U.S. Decennial Census

=== 2020 census ===
As of the 2020 census, Pittsboro had a population of 3,682. The median age was 36.9 years. 27.2% of residents were under the age of 18 and 14.7% of residents were 65 years of age or older. For every 100 females there were 93.3 males, and for every 100 females age 18 and over there were 91.8 males age 18 and over.

98.4% of residents lived in urban areas, while 1.6% lived in rural areas.

There were 1,383 households in Pittsboro, of which 38.9% had children under the age of 18 living in them. Of all households, 58.7% were married-couple households, 13.0% were households with a male householder and no spouse or partner present, and 21.9% were households with a female householder and no spouse or partner present. About 21.0% of all households were made up of individuals and 9.7% had someone living alone who was 65 years of age or older.

There were 1,428 housing units, of which 3.2% were vacant. The homeowner vacancy rate was 1.1% and the rental vacancy rate was 2.9%.

Racial composition as of the 2020 census
Race	Number	Percent
White	3,327	90.4%
Black or African American	86	2.3%
American Indian and Alaska Native	3	0.1%
Asian	56	1.5%
Native Hawaiian and Other Pacific Islander	0	0.0%
Some other race	30	0.8%
Two or more races	180	4.9%
Hispanic or Latino (of any race)	91	2.5%

=== 2010 census ===
As of the census of 2010, there were 2,928 people, 1,072 households, and 832 families residing in the town. The population density was 992.5 inhabitants per square mile (383.2/km^{2}). There were 1,128 housing units at an average density of 382.4 per square mile (147.6/km^{2}). The racial makeup of the town was 96.7% White, 0.4% African American, 0.4% Native American, 0.7% Asian, 0.2% from other races, and 1.7% from two or more races. Hispanic or Latino of any race were 1.4% of the population.

There were 1,072 households, of which 44.5% had children under the age of 18 living with them, 61.8% were married couples living together, 12.2% had a female householder with no husband present, 3.6% had a male householder with no wife present, and 22.4% were non-families. 18.6% of all households were made up of individuals, and 6.4% had someone living alone who was 65 years of age or older. The average household size was 2.73 and the average family size was 3.13.

The median age in the town was 36.3 years. 30.8% of residents were under the age of 18; 5.1% were between the ages of 18 and 24; 29.9% were from 25 to 44; 23.4% were from 45 to 64; and 10.9% were 65 years of age or older. The gender makeup of the town was 48.4% male and 51.6% female.

=== 2000 census ===
As of the census of 2000, there were 1,588 people, 621 households, and 465 families residing in the town. The population density was 1,040.0 inhabitants per square mile (401.5/km^{2}). There were 643 housing units at an average density of 421.1 per square mile (162.6/km^{2}). The racial makeup of the town was 98.49% White, 0.06% African American, 0.13% Native American, 0.06% Asian, 0.25% from other races, and 1.01% from two or more races. Hispanic or Latino of any race were 0.88% of the population.

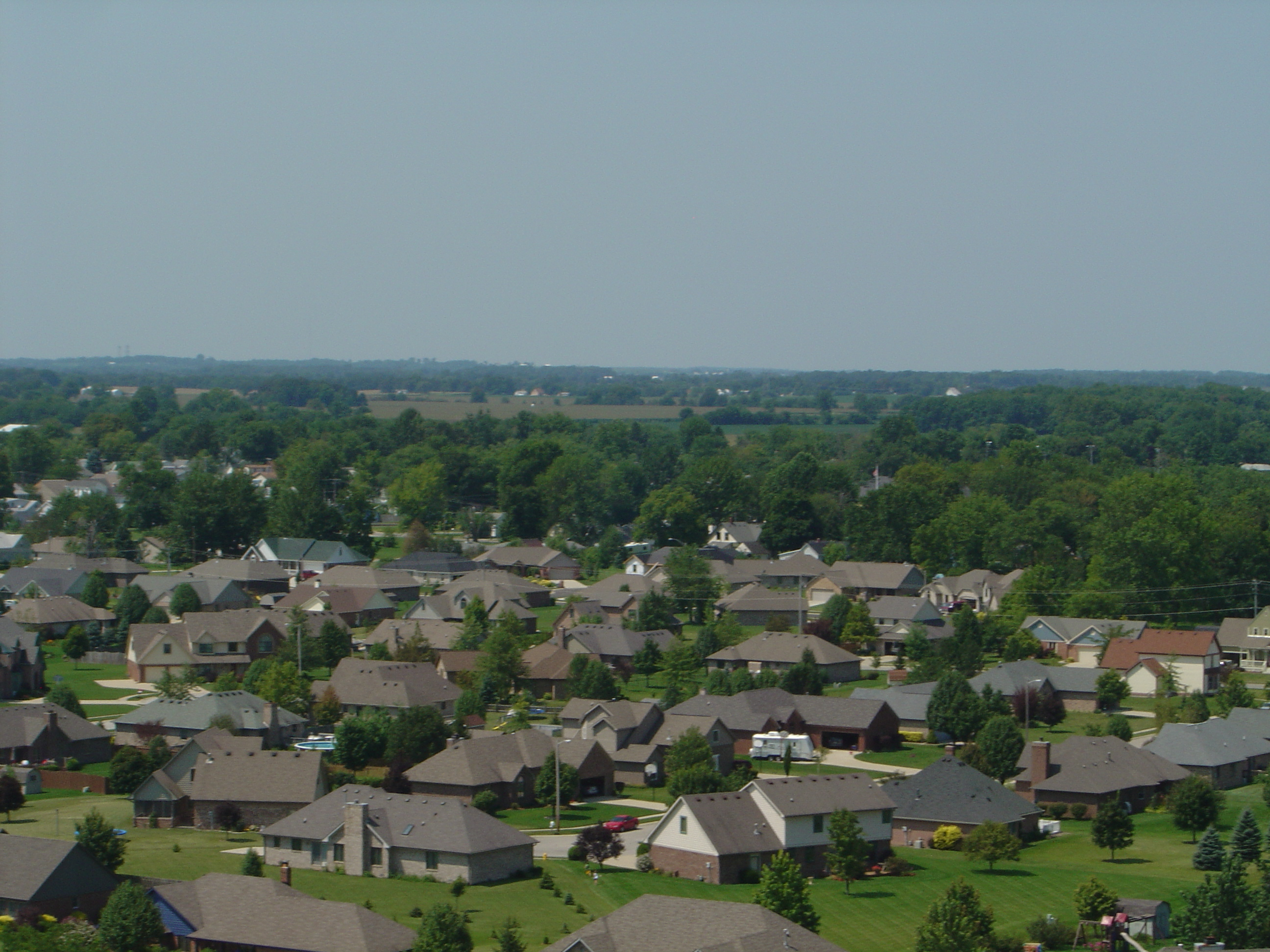
Deer Meadows neighborhood

There were 621 households, out of which 40.3% had children under the age of 18 living with them, 61.5% were married couples living together, 11.0% had a female householder with no husband present, and 25.1% were non-families. 21.6% of all households were made up of individuals, and 9.7% had someone living alone who was 65 years of age or older. The average household size was 2.56 and the average family size was 2.97.

In the town, the population was spread out, with 28.7% under the age of 18, 8.1% from 18 to 24, 34.3% from 25 to 44, 17.7% from 45 to 64, and 11.2% who were 65 years of age or older. The median age was 32 years. For every 100 females, there were 88.4 males. For every 100 females age 18 and over, there were 84.5 males.

The median income for a household in the town was $47,740, and the median income for a family was $56,417. Males had a median income of $41,935 versus $27,875 for females. The per capita income for the town was $20,904. About 1.7% of families and 3.0% of the population were below the poverty line, including 1.3% of those under age 18 and 5.0% of those age 65 or over.

== Government ==
=== Town council ===
A five-member town council elected by the citizens serves as both the executive and legislative branches of the local town government. The town council president and vice-president are chosen by the members of the council.

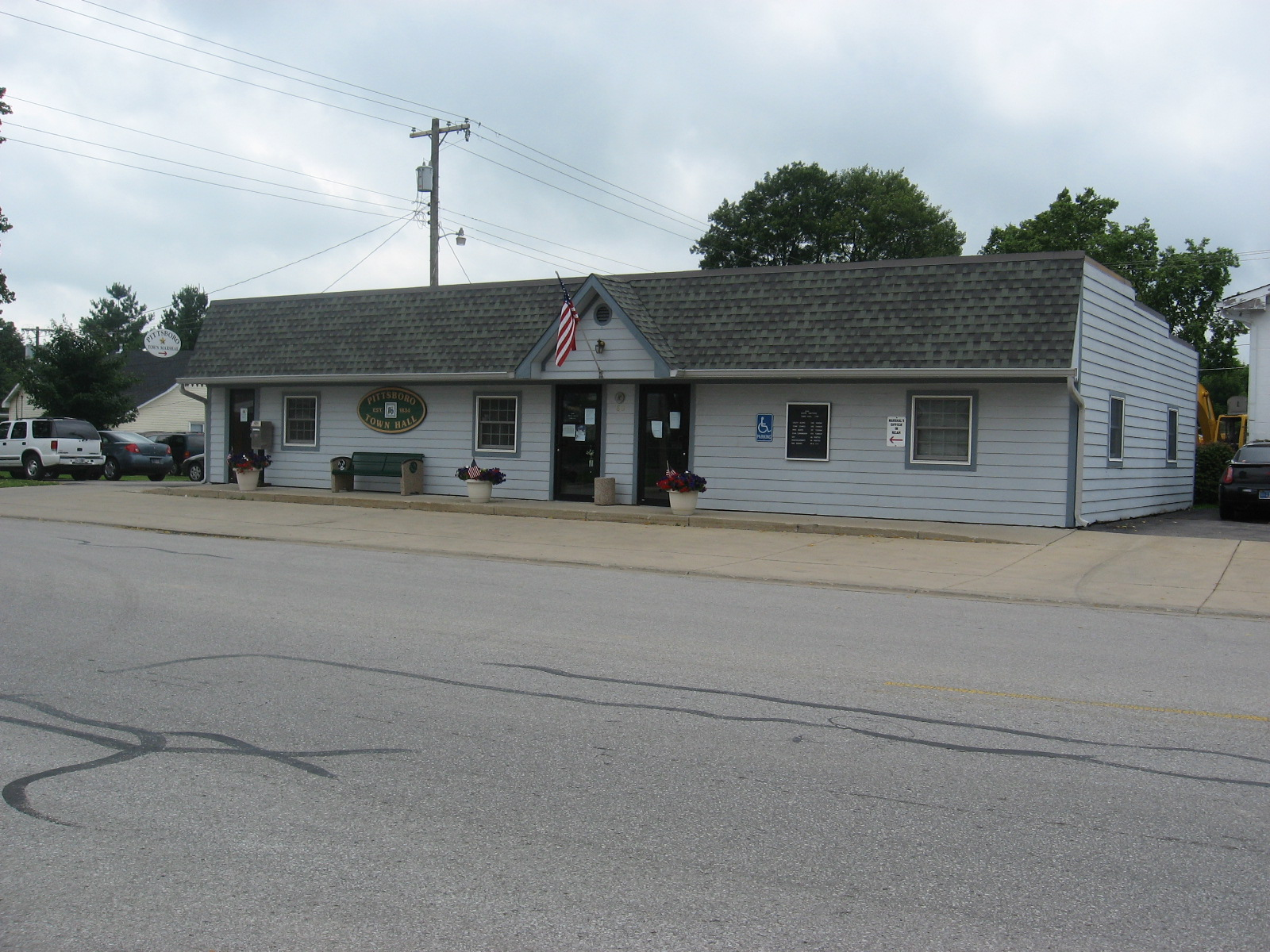
Pittsboro Town Hall

==== Legislative duties ====
The town council serves as the legislative and executive branches of government for the town. The town council passes ordinances and resolutions to govern town matters. The town council also establishes salaries for town employees, appoints officeholders, passes a yearly budget, and sets utility rates.

=== Clerk-Treasurer ===
The clerk-treasurer is the fiscal officer of the town responsible for signing drafts and claims, dispersing monies on the order of the town council, maintains records, record minutes of meetings, administer oaths, and serves as a tie-breaker in votes of the town council.

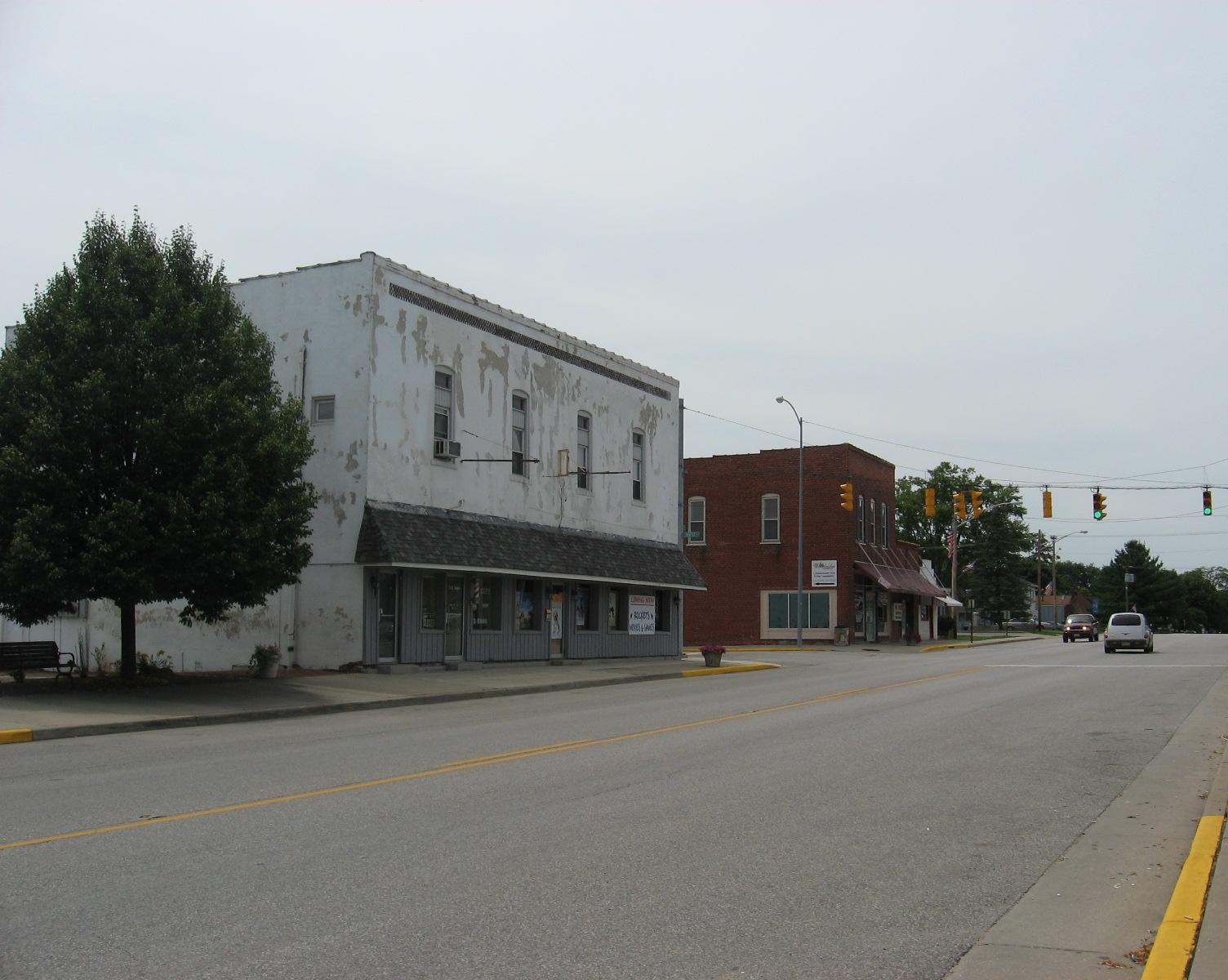
The Hayworth Building and Sawyer Building

=== Town manager ===
The town manager is the administrative head of town government and serves at the pleasure of the town council. The town manager runs the day-to-day operations of the town and works with the town council to set policy.

=== Boards and commissions ===
Various boards and commissions govern different aspects of the town. All seats are appointed either by the Town Council or Town Council President. They serve in either an advisory role or autonomous to the Town Council in the case of the Parks Board. All members must be citizens of the Town. The boards and commissions are as follows: Advisory Plan Commission, Parks Board, Advisory Utility Board, Redevelopment Commission, Board of Zoning Appeals, and Fire Board. The Town Council also serves as the Police Safety Board.

==== Parks Board ====
The Parks Board oversees all aspects of the Parks Department. The Parks Board was created by ordinance and currently consists of six members. The Parks Board is allowed by Indiana statute to buy and sell land, enter into and sever contracts, and create a budget to name a few. The Town Council has final budget authority and sets salaries in the salary ordinance. The Parks Board appoints a Park Superintendent and oversees the Town's three parks.

==== Advisory Plan Commission ====
The Advisory Plan Commission is the building and planning authority for the Town. It consists of seven members, four of which are citizen members appointed by the Town Council President and three who must be either Town employees or appointed or elected members of another board appointed by the Town Council as a whole. The Plan Commission advises the Town Council on zoning, annexation, and various zoning ordinances. The Plan Commission can act alone in deciding street names, final plat approval, building permits, zoning violations, and addressing. The Plan Commission sets its own rules and procedures and appoints a Zoning Administrator.

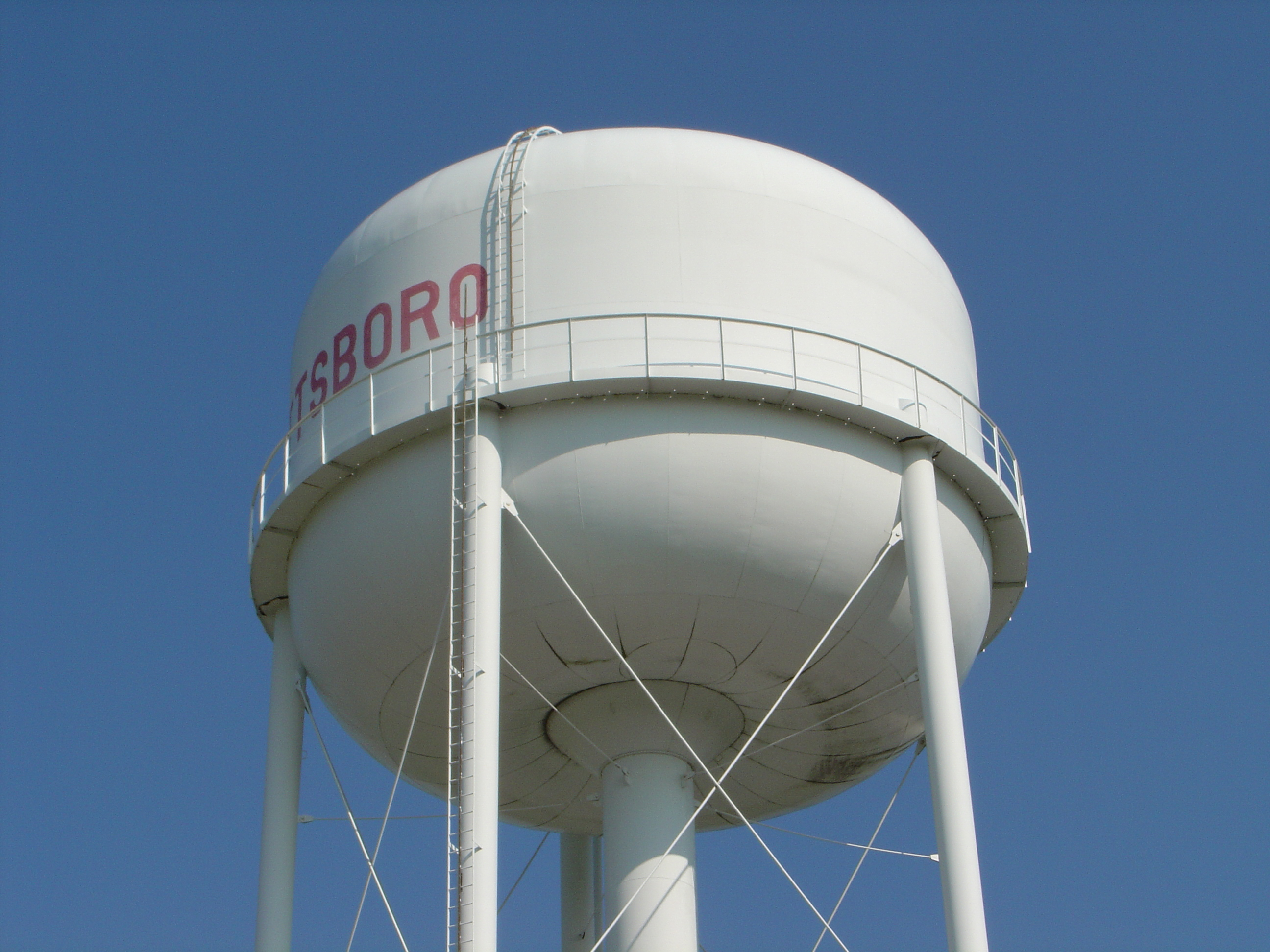
Pittsboro water tower

==== Advisory Utility Board ====
The Advisory Utility Board serves as overseer of the Town's four utilities water, sewer, electric, and gas. The five members are appointed by the Town Council and composed of one Town Council Member. The Utility Board advises the Town Council on rates and charges by the individual utilities.

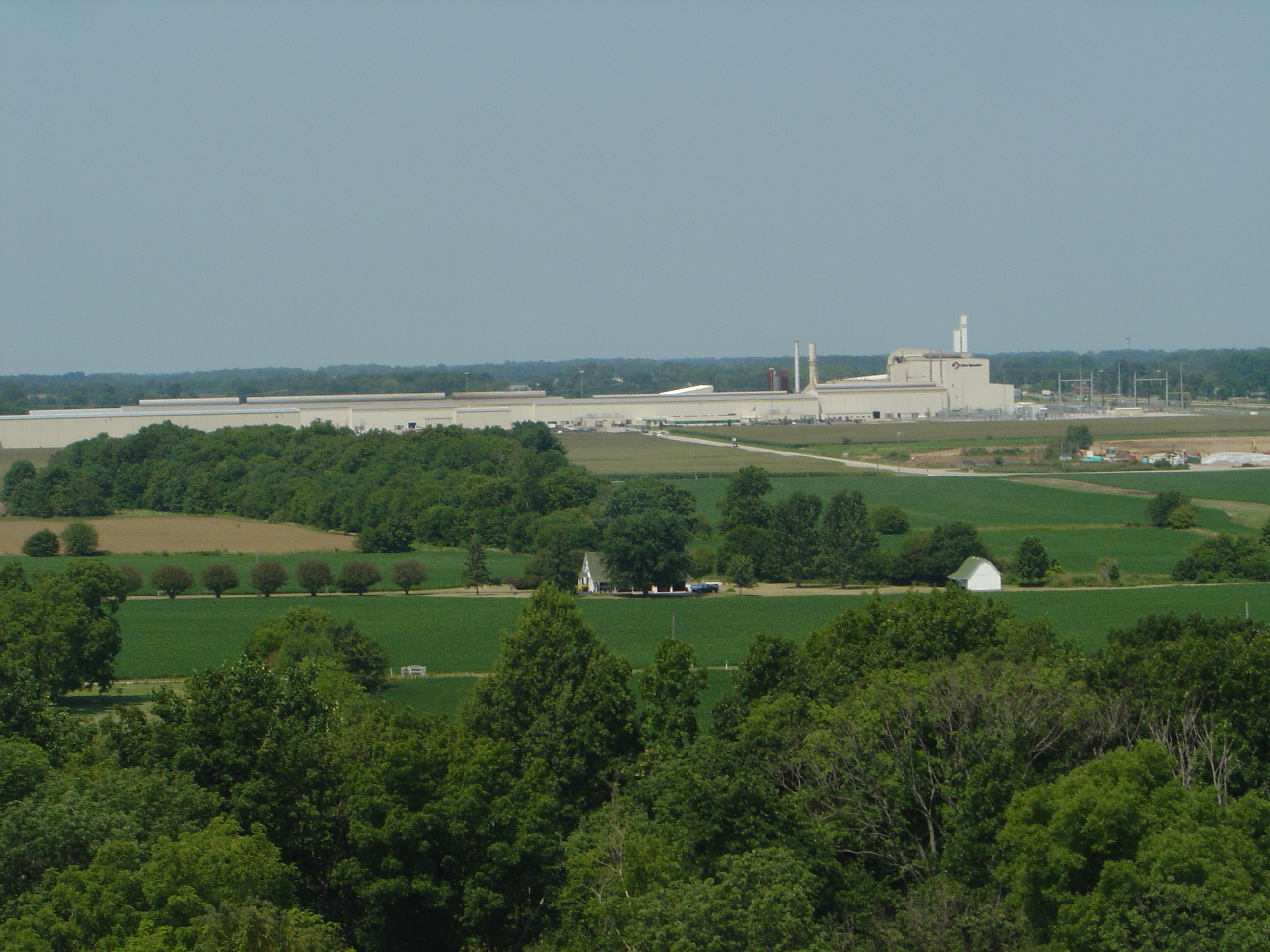
Steel Dynamics mill

==== Redevelopment Commission ====
The Redevelopment Commission affords the Town a maximum opportunity for rehabilitation, redevelopment, or economic development areas by private enterprise and the Town. The commission is controlled by a five-member board. The Town Council President appoints three citizen members and the whole Town Council appoints the remaining two. The Commission makes recommendations on special taxing districts for the purposes of redevelopment.

==== Board of Zoning Appeals ====
The Board of Zoning Appeals shall have exclusive subject matter jurisdiction for dimensional variances, use variances, special exceptions, and administrative appeals. The Board of Zoning Appeals serves as a sort of a judicial body that is autonomous from other town boards and commissions. The Board consists of five members. Three members are appointed by the Town Council President, of whom one must be a member of the Plan Commission and two who must not. One citizen member is appointed by the Town Council as a whole who must not be a member of the Plan Commission. The final member is appointed by the Plan Commission from its membership.

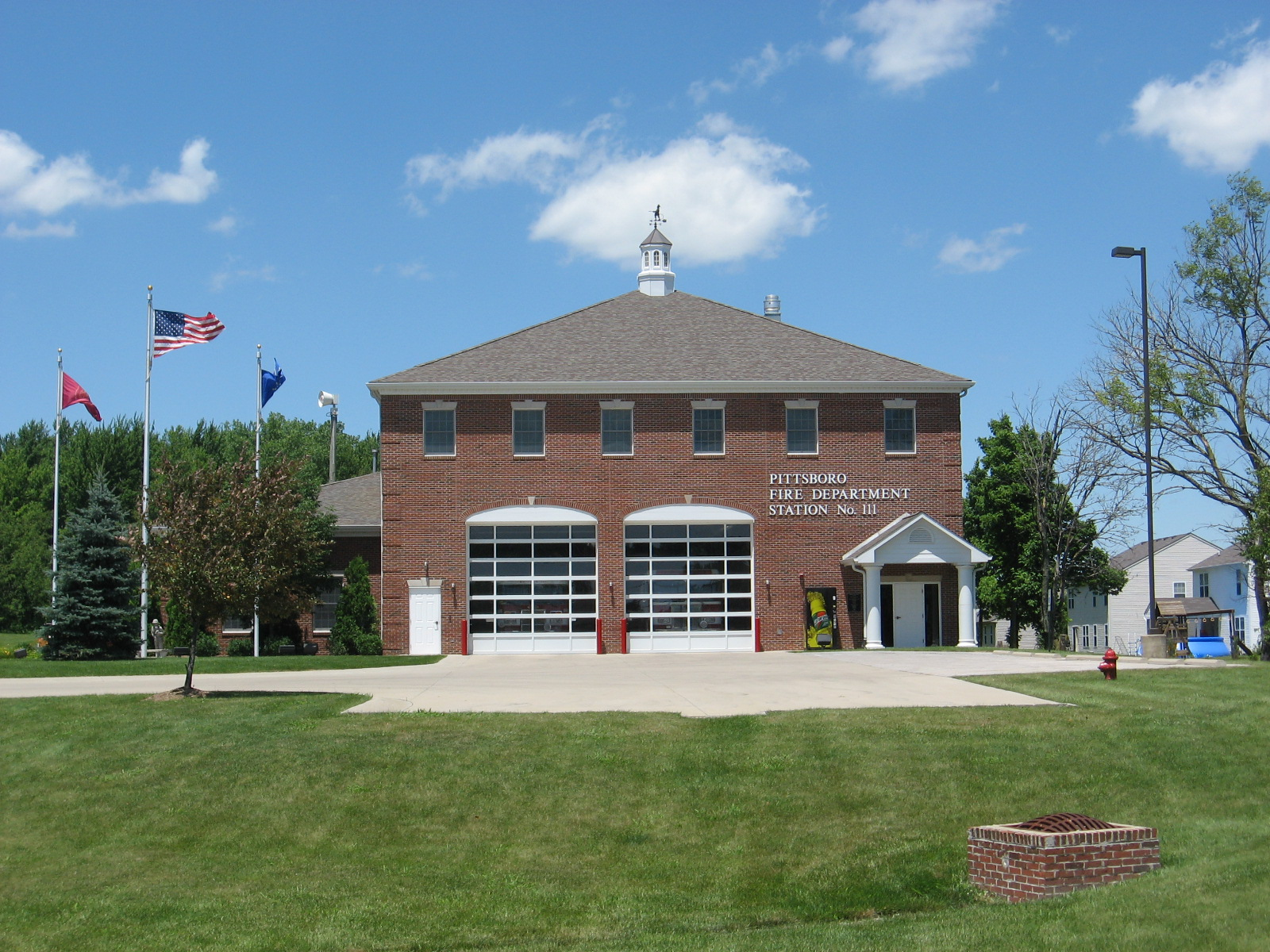
Pittsboro Fire Department station

==== Fire Board ====
The Fire Board oversees the fire department and has final approval of annual budgets, hiring and firing, expenditures not previously budgeted, and future planning. The Fire Board consists of four members. The Town Council appoints two citizen members, the Middle Township Advisory Board appoints one from its board to the Fire Board, and the Middle Township Trustee is the final member. The Fire Department is housed in one station on Main Street in Pittsboro. The fire chief oversees the Fire Department and is appointed by the Fire Board. There are nineteen full-time firefighters, fifteen reserve firefighters, four full-time admin personnel, and a fire marshal. The Fire Department protects about thirty-five square miles in Pittsboro and Middle Township. They provide fire suppression, auto-extrication, ambulance, and fire-prevention services.

==== Police Safety Board ====
The Town Council as a whole serves in an additional capacity as the Police Safety Board. The Safety Board chooses the Town Marshal, is in charge of hiring and firing of police officers, and serves as the disciplinary board. The Police Department consists of eight full-time Police Officers, two part-time Officers and one Reserve Officer. Their offices are located at Town Hall. The Police Department shall enforce all state laws and local ordinances. A Town Marshal appointed by the Town Council and oversees the Police Department. The Police Department provide public safety, patrols Town streets, educates the public, and maintains order at public meetings.

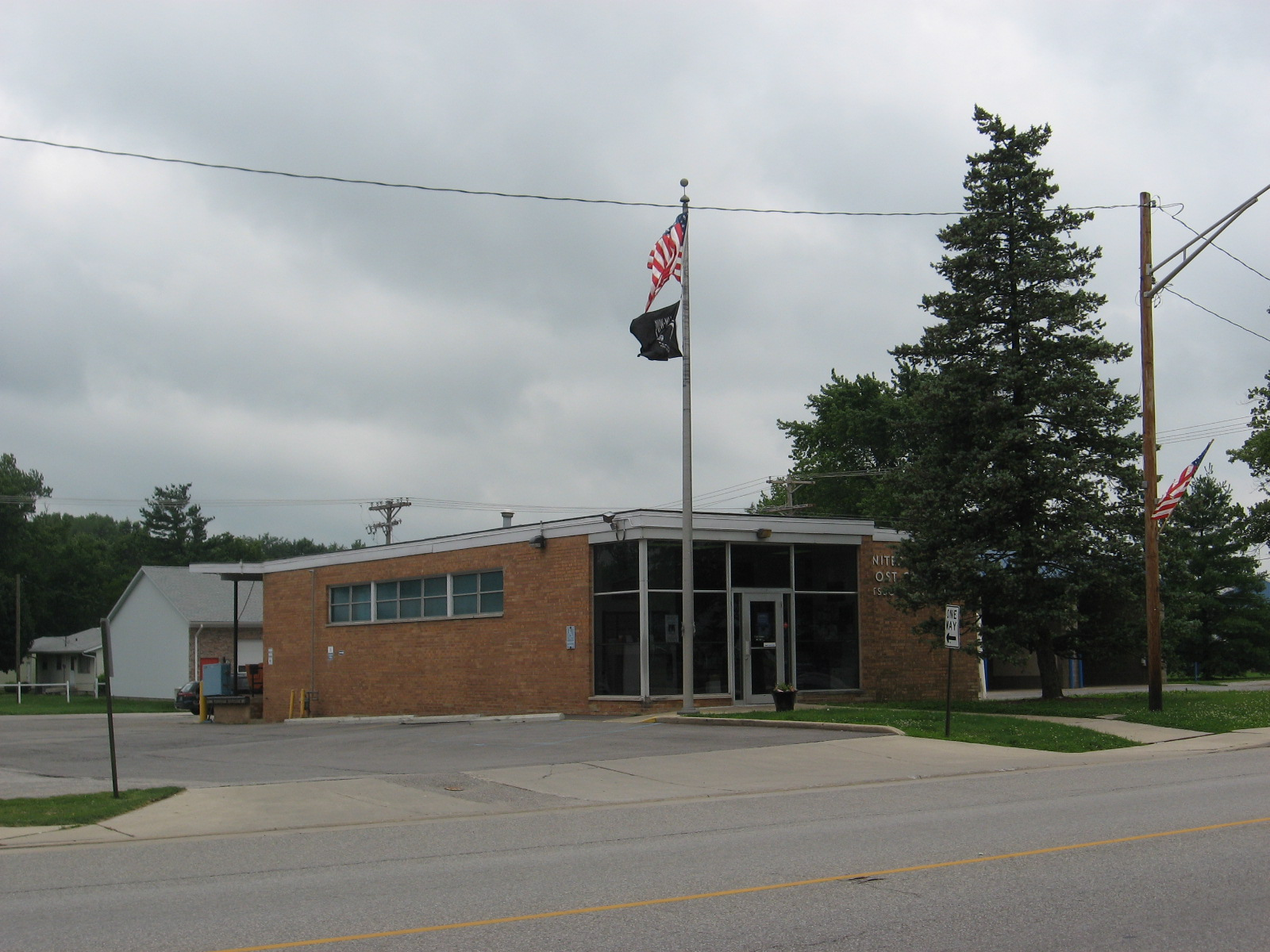
Pittsboro Post Office

== Departments ==
=== Police Department ===
The Pittsboro Police Department is established under a 5-member police commission. The town council appoints the police commission members. The police commission appoints the chief of police. There are currently 9 full time officers, 2 part-time officers and 1 reserve officer. The police department is responsible for investigating crimes, patrolling the town, traffic control, public safety and crime prevention. The department participates yearly in National Night Out.

=== Fire Department ===
The Pittsboro Fire Department serves the Town of Pittsboro and Middle Township. The department was combined into one agency in 1998 and levies a flat tax rate to both the town and township. The Middle Township Trustee sets the levy at the direction of a combined town and township fire board. The fire chief is the administrative head of the fire department and serves at the pleasure of the fire board.

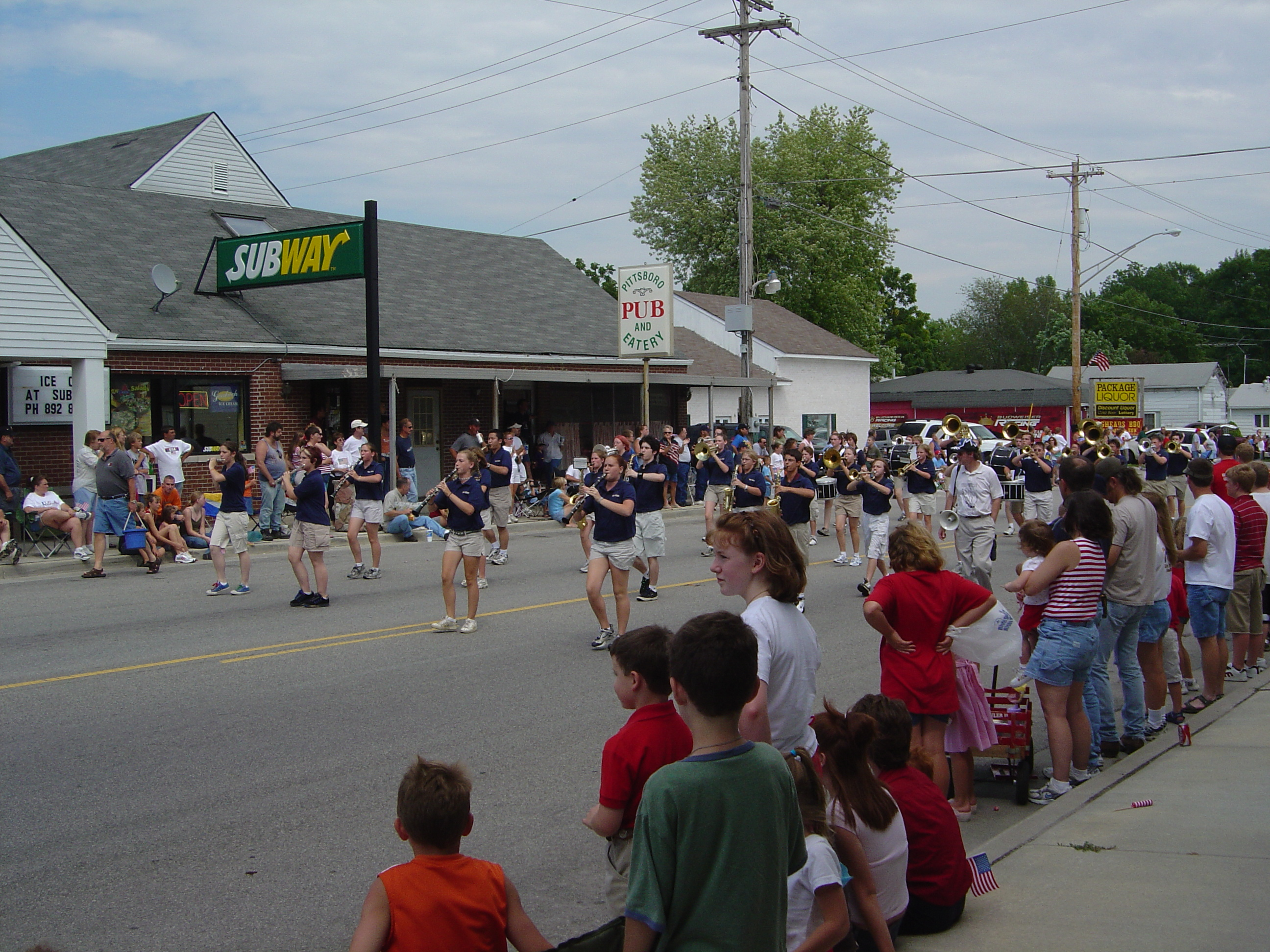
Parade in Downtown Pittsboro

=== Street Department ===
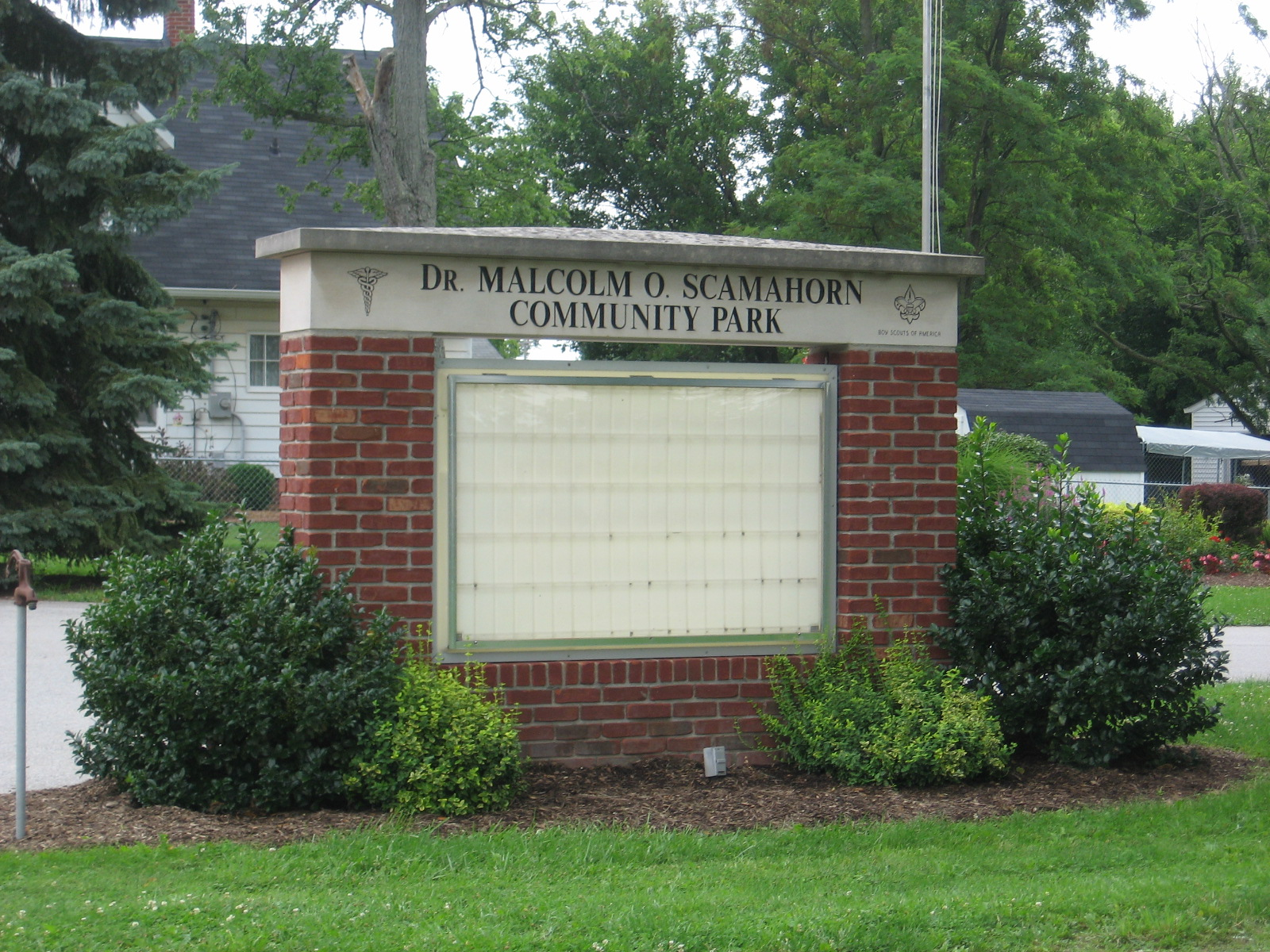
Scamahorn Park

The street department is responsible for all town streets, sidewalks, curbs, and street signs. Although budgeted as a separate department the street department does not have dedicated employees. Employees from other utilities crossover to handle street duties. The street department patches holes, plows snow, installs street signs, repairs sidewalks and curbs, and paints curbs.

=== Parks Department ===
The parks department is responsible for the towns three parks and plans several different festivals throughout the year. The parks department installs and maintains park equipment, mows grass, rents buildings, and keeps the parks tidy. The park superintendent is the administrative head of the parks and carries out many of the duties listed above. The park superintendent serves at the pleasure of the parks board.

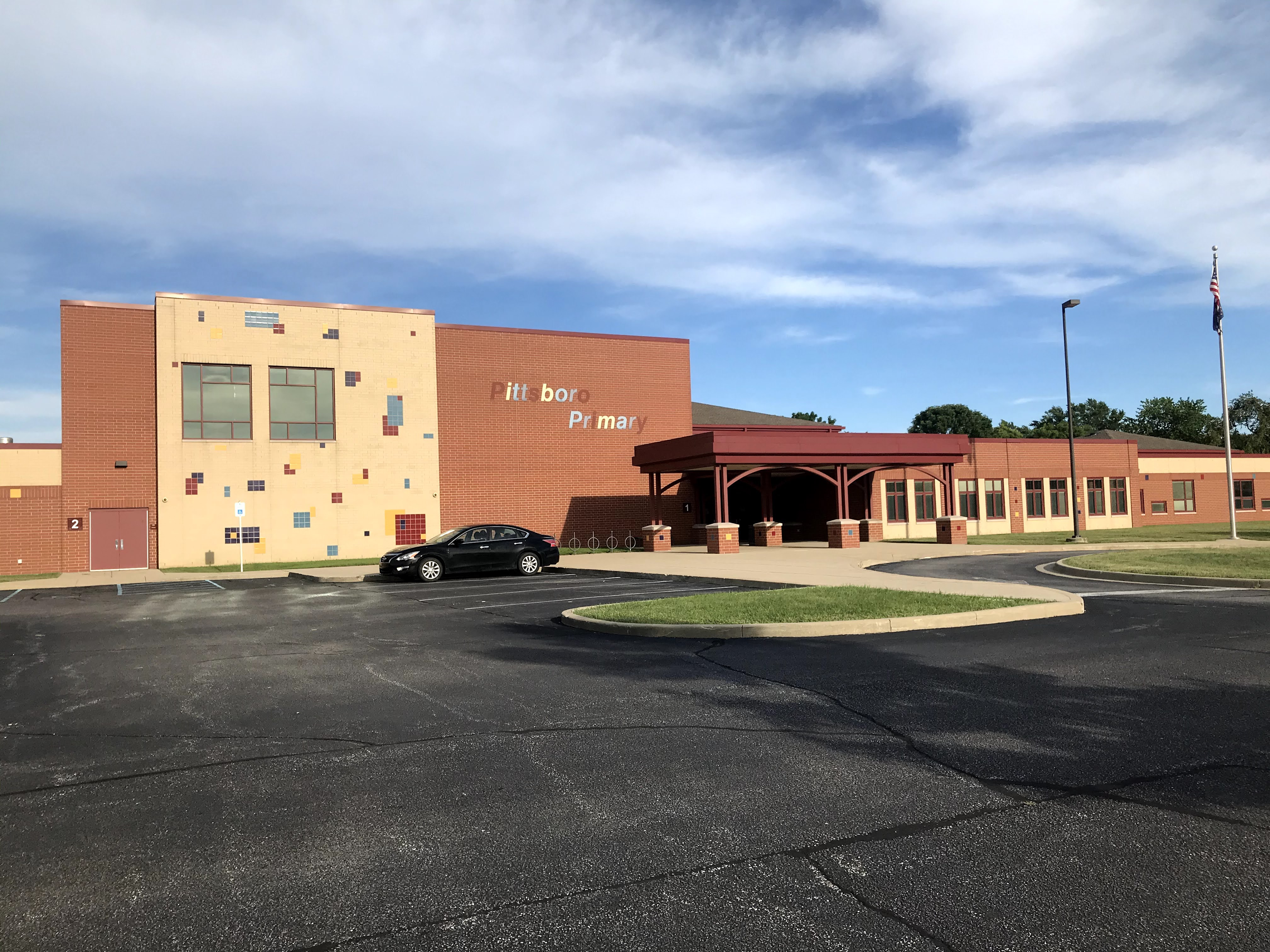
Pittsboro Primary School

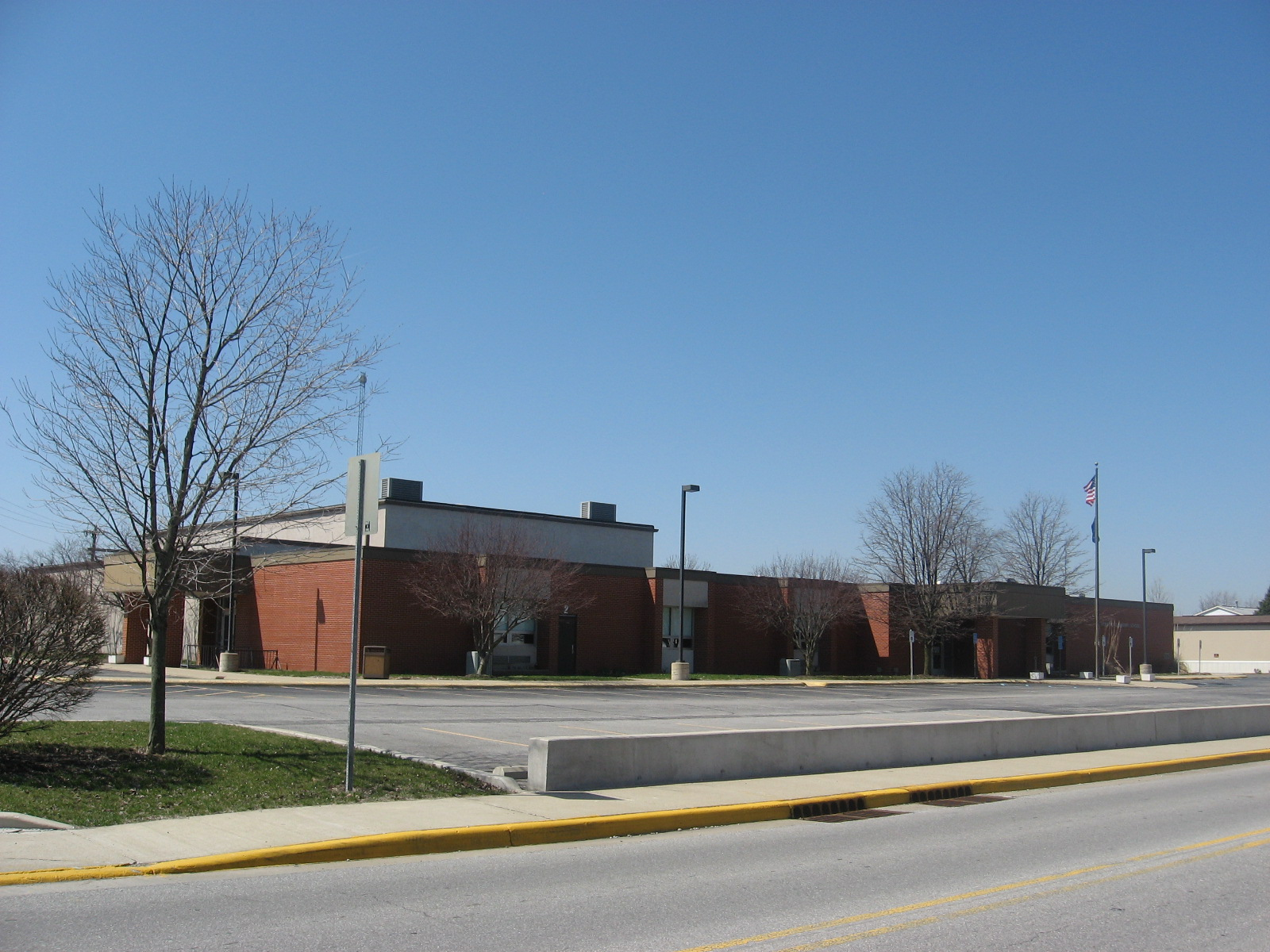
Pittsboro Elementary School

== Education ==
It is in the North West Hendricks School Corporation.

Schools:

- Pittsboro Elementary School
- Pittsboro Primary School

Both schools are part of the North West Hendricks School Corporation. The district's comprehensive high school is Tri-West Hendricks High School.

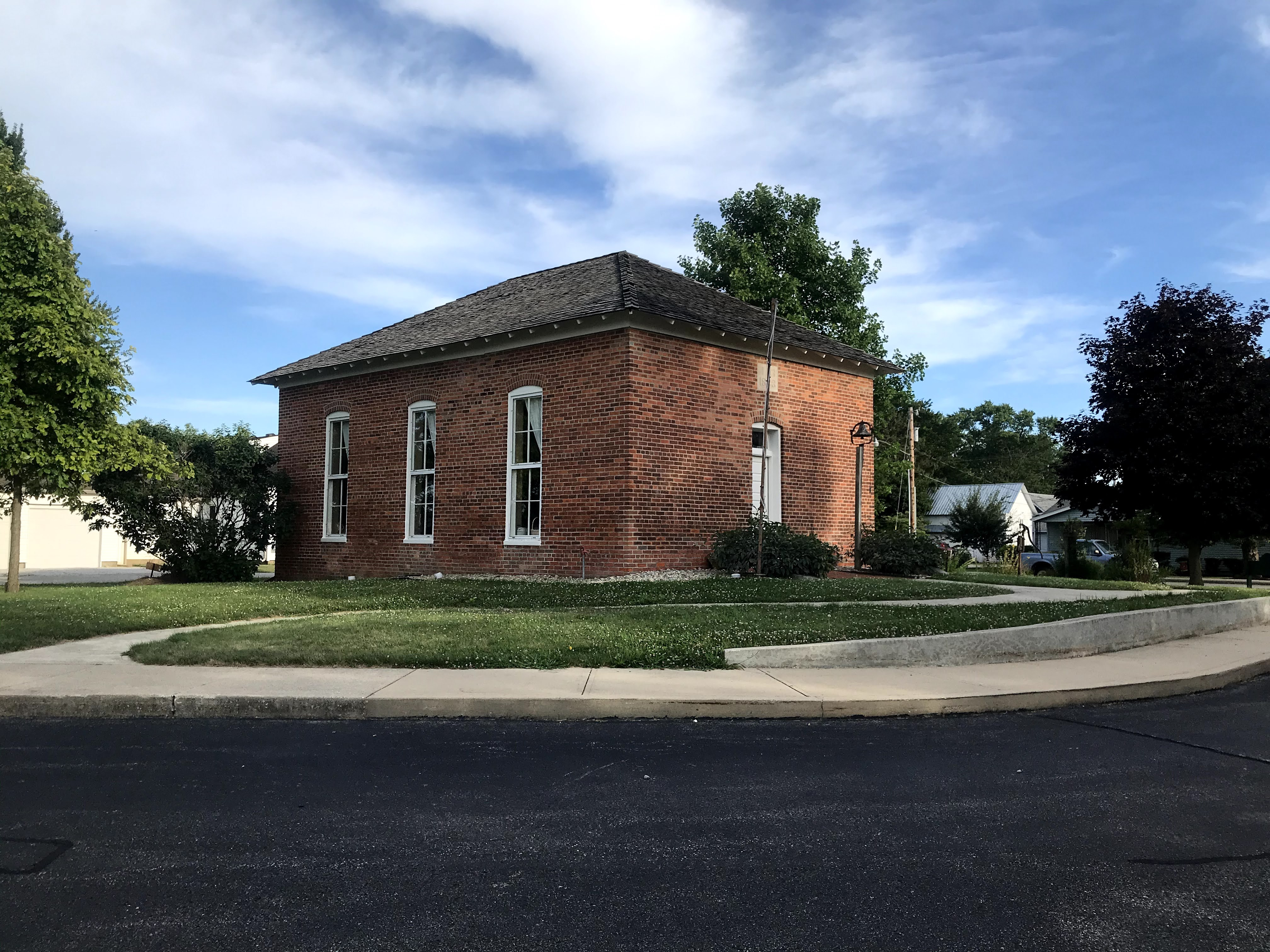
1883 One Room School

== Notable people ==
- Niki Christoff, political operative and business executive
- Jeff Gordon, four-time NASCAR Winston Cup Series champion
- Bridget Sloan, Olympic gymnast

== See also ==
- Pittsboro High School
