= List of Bruin mascots =

Various sports teams are named "the Bruins" and have a bear for a mascot.

== Professional ==
- Boston Bruins, National Hockey League
- Chilliwack Bruins, Western Hockey League
- Providence Bruins, American Hockey League

== Collegiate ==
- Bellevue University
- Belmont University
- Bethany University
- Bob Jones University
- Carolina University
- Cornell University - traditional, now Big Red
- George Fox University
- Kellogg Community College
- Salt Lake Community College
- Sheridan College
- University of California, Los Angeles (UCLA)

== High school ==
- Baldwin Senior High School (Baldwin, New York)
- Ballard High School (Louisville, Kentucky)
- Bartlesville High School (Bartlesville, Oklahoma)
- Bayshore High School (Bradenton, Florida)
- Bear Creek High School (Stockton, California)
- Bear River High School (Grass Valley, California)
- Beddingfield High School (Wilson, North Carolina)
- Bell City High School (Bell City, Louisiana)
- Belleview Christian School (Westminster, Colorado)
- Bethel High School (Hampton, Virginia)
- Blackford High School (Indiana)
- Blacksburg High School (Blacksburg, Virginia)
- Bloomington High School (Bloomington, California)
- Bolton High School (Alexandria, Louisiana) (Female Team)
- Brentwood High School (Brentwood, Tennessee)
- Britannia Secondary School (Vancouver, British Columbia)
- Broadneck High School (Arnold, Maryland)
- Brookings-Harbor High School (Brookings, Oregon)
- Cascade High School (Everett, Washington)
- Cedaredge High School (Cedaredge, Colorado)
- Central Hardin High School (Cecilia, Kentucky)
- Cherry Creek High School (Denver, Colorado)
- Columbia (White Salmon) High School (White Salmon, Washington)
- Fargo South High School (Fargo, North Dakota)
- Forest Park High School (Woodbridge, Virginia)
- Gardiner High School (Gardiner, Montana)
- Hopi High School (Keams Canyon, Arizona)
- Juneau-Douglas High School (Juneau, Alaska)
- Lancaster High School (Lancaster, South Carolina)
- Lake Braddock Secondary School (Burke, Virginia)
- Mountain View High School (Orem, Utah)
- North Bergen High School (North Bergen, New Jersey)
- Northrop High School (Fort Wayne, Indiana)
- Orangeburg Wilkinson High School (Orangeburg, South Carolina)
- Padua Franciscan High School (Parma, Ohio)
- Ponderosa High School (Shingle Springs, California)
- Pulaski Academy (Little Rock, Arkansas)
- Rock Bridge High School (Columbia, Missouri)
- Saint Bede Academy (Peru, Illinois)
- Sam Barlow High School (Gresham, Oregon)
- Santa Clara High School (Santa Clara, California)
- South Florence High School (Florence, South Carolina)
- St. Joseph Catholic School (Madison, Mississippi)
- Trevor G. Browne High School (Phoenix, Arizona)
- Tri-West Hendricks High School (Lizton, Indiana)
- Twin Falls High School (Twin Falls, Idaho)
- University School of Jackson (Jackson, Tennessee)
- Western Branch High School (Chesapeake, Virginia)
- Woodrow Wilson Classical High School (Long Beach, California)
- St. Patrick-St. Vincent High School (Vallejo, California)

== Middle school ==
- Greenacres Middle School (Spokane Valley, Washington)
- Robert E. Howard Middle School (Orangeburg, South Carolina)
- St. Teresa of Avila School (Cincinnati, Ohio)
- Bearden Middle School (Knoxville, Tennessee)
- Western Branch Middle School (Chesapeake, Virginia)
- St. Angela Merici School (K-8) (Fairview Park, Ohio)
