= Center Township, Hendricks County, Indiana =

Center Township
- Township
- Seal

- Location in Hendricks County
- Coordinates: 39°46′09″N 86°31′18″W
- Country: United States
- State: Indiana
- County: Hendricks

Government
  - Type: Indiana township

Area
  - Total: 46.22 sq mi (119.72 km^{2})
  - Land: 46.11 sq mi (119.43 km^{2})
  - Water: 0.11 sq mi (0.29 km^{2}) 0.24%
- Elevation: 866 ft (264 m)

Population (2020)
  - Total: 13,151
  - Density: 264/sq mi (101.9/km^{2})
- Time zone: UTC-5 (Eastern (EST))
  - Summer (DST): UTC-4 (EDT)
- GNIS feature ID: 453181
- Website: centertownshiptrustee.org

Center Township is one of twelve townships in Hendricks County, Indiana, United States. As of the 2010 census, its population was 12,167.

== History ==
Center Township was so named from its position near the geographical center of Hendricks County.

== Geography ==
Center Township covers an area of 46.22 square miles (119.7 km^{2}); of this, 0.11 square miles (0.28 km^{2}) or 0.24 percent is water. The stream of Thompson Creek runs through this township.

=== Cities and towns ===
- Danville (the county seat)

=== Unincorporated towns ===
- Gale
- Nash

(This list is based on USGS data and may include former settlements.)

=== Adjacent townships ===
- Union Township (north)
- Middle Township (northeast)
- Washington Township (east)
- Liberty Township (south)
- Clay Township (southwest)
- Marion Township (west)
- Eel River Township (northwest)

=== Cemeteries ===
The township contains twenty-one cemeteries: Arnold, Arnold-Stuart, Ayears, Christie East, Christie West, Cofer, Danville East, Danville South, Gentry, Hardwick, Hillside, Hyten, Kiger, Mill Creek, Mount Pleasant, New Mill Creek (historical), Nichols, Noland Number 2, Primitive Baptist, Saint Augustine Memorial Gardens and Templin.

=== Major highways ===
- U.S. Route 36
- Indiana State Road 39
- Indiana State Road 236

=== Airports and landing strips ===
- Hendricks County Airport
- Meadors Field Airport II82
- JR's Airport 11IN
- Temple Airport

== Education ==
The township is in the Danville Community School Corporation.

Center Township residents may obtain a free library card from the Danville-Center Township Public Library in Danville.
