= Maplewood, Indiana =

- Unincorporated community
- Location within Indiana Location within the United States
- Coordinates: 39°50′04″N 86°30′19″W
- Country: United States
- State: Indiana
- County: Hendricks
- Township: Middle
- Elevation: 945 ft (288 m)
- ZIP code: 46167
- FIPS code: 18-46620
- GNIS feature ID: 438584

Maplewood is an unincorporated community in Middle Township, Hendricks County, Indiana.

The post office Maplewood once contained was originally called Progress, in 1880. The post office was renamed Maplewood in 1881, and closed in 1912.

== Geography ==
Maplewood is located at 39°50′04″N 86°30′19″W.
