= North West Hendricks School Corporation =

School district in Indiana

Coordinates: 39°53′07.4″N 86°32′47.3″W

North West Hendricks School Corporation is a public school district for the townships of Middle, Union, and Eel River in Hendricks County, Indiana. North West Hendricks School Corporation has operated as a school district since July 1, 1965. The reported enrollment of the NWHSC during the 2015–2016 school year was 1,886. The district has a total land area of 98.4 square miles. In 2011 the district's ISTEP scores increased even further moving it from the 5th ranked school district in the state to the 4th highest ranked school district in the state. The current superintendent is Scott Syverson.

== Boundary ==
The district comprises areas in Eel River, Middle, and Union townships. It includes the municipalities of Lizton, North Salem, and Pittsboro, as well as portions of Brownsburg and Jamestown.

== Schools ==
=== Tri-West Hendricks High School ===
Tri-West Hendricks High School is a public high school located in Lizton, Indiana that was constructed in 1975. A junior high was added in 1983 for the junior high grades before Tri-West Middle School was completed in 2003, where the 6-8 graders moved into. From 2008 to 2010 the high school was renovated and expanded because of the growing number of students and to update the school. It holds grades 9-12 from the townships of Middle, Union, and Eel River.

- Tri- West Hendricks High School website

=== Tri-West Middle School ===
Tri-West Middle School is a middle school located in Lizton, Indiana by the high school. It was completed in 2003 and holds grades 6-8 from the townships of Middle, and Union, Eel River.

- Tri-West Middle School website

=== Pittsboro Elementary School ===
Pittsboro Elementary School is an elementary school in Pittsboro, Indiana. It holds grades 3-5 for Middle Township. In 2007, the elementary school added trailers for the fifth graders since it was getting too crowded in the building. They moved back in 2010 when Kindergarten through 2nd grade moved out to the primary school. School history:

- Pittsboro Elementary School website

=== Pittsboro Primary School ===
Pittsboro Primary School is a primary school located in Pittsboro, Indiana behind the elementary school. It opened in the fall of 2010. It holds grades K-2 for Middle Township too, while the elementary school holds grades 3–5.

- Pittsboro Primary School website

=== North Salem Elementary School ===
North Salem Elementary School is an elementary school located in North Salem, Indiana. The school contains kids in grades K-5 for the townships of Union and Eel River. The elementary school consists of two older but remodeled sections and one new section which was completed in 2001.

- North Salem Elementary School website

== See also ==
- Pittsboro High School
