= Eel River Township, Hendricks County, Indiana =

Eel River Township
- Township
- Location in Hendricks County
- Coordinates: 39°52′19″N 86°37′50″W
- Country: United States
- State: Indiana
- County: Hendricks

Government
  - Type: Indiana township

Area
  - Total: 42.54 sq mi (110.18 km^{2})
  - Land: 42.54 sq mi (110.18 km^{2})
  - Water: 0 sq mi (0 km^{2}) 0%
- Elevation: 920 ft (280 m)

Population (2020)
  - Total: 1,707
  - Density: 39/sq mi (15.1/km^{2})
- GNIS feature ID: 0453274

Eel River Township is one of twelve townships in Hendricks County, Indiana, United States. As of the 2010 census, its population was 1,662.

== History ==
Eel River Township was organized in about 1828.

== Geography ==
Eel River Township covers an area of 42.54 square miles (110.2 km^{2}). The streams of East Fork Big Walnut Creek, Hunt Creek, Middle Fork Big Walnut Creek and Ramp Run run through this township.

=== Cities and towns ===
- Jamestown (south edge)
- North Salem

=== Adjacent townships ===
- Jackson Township, Boone County (north)
- Union Township (east)
- Center Township (southeast)
- Marion Township (south)
- Jackson Township, Putnam County (southwest)
- Clark Township, Montgomery County (west)

=== Cemeteries ===
The township contains sixteen cemeteries: Adams, Campbell, Devenport, Fairview, Fleece, Fullen, Gossett, Hypes, Kidd Farm, North Salem Baptist, Page, Pennington, Richardson, Roundtown, Trotter and Zimmerman.

=== Major highways ===
- Interstate 74
- U.S. Route 136
- Indiana State Road 75
- Indiana State Road 234
- Indiana State Road 236

=== Airports and landing strips ===
- Reynolds Landing Strip

== Education ==
It is in the North West Hendricks School Corporation.
