= Tilden, Indiana =

Settlement in Indiana, United States

- Unincorporated community
- Location within Indiana Location within the United States
- Coordinates: 39°49′17″N 86°26′20″W
- Country: United States
- State: Indiana
- County: Hendricks
- Township: Middle
- Founder: Samuel J. Tilden
- Named for: Samuel J. Tilden
- Elevation: 902 ft (275 m)
- Time zone: Eastern Standard Time
- ZIP code: 46122
- FIPS code: 18-75662
- GNIS feature ID: 444756

Tilden is an unincorporated community in Middle Township, Hendricks County, Indiana.

== History ==
A post office was established at Tilden in 1880, and remained in operation until it was discontinued in 1913. The community was named for politician Samuel J. Tilden.
