= Niki Christoff =

American lawyer and former Republican campaign operative

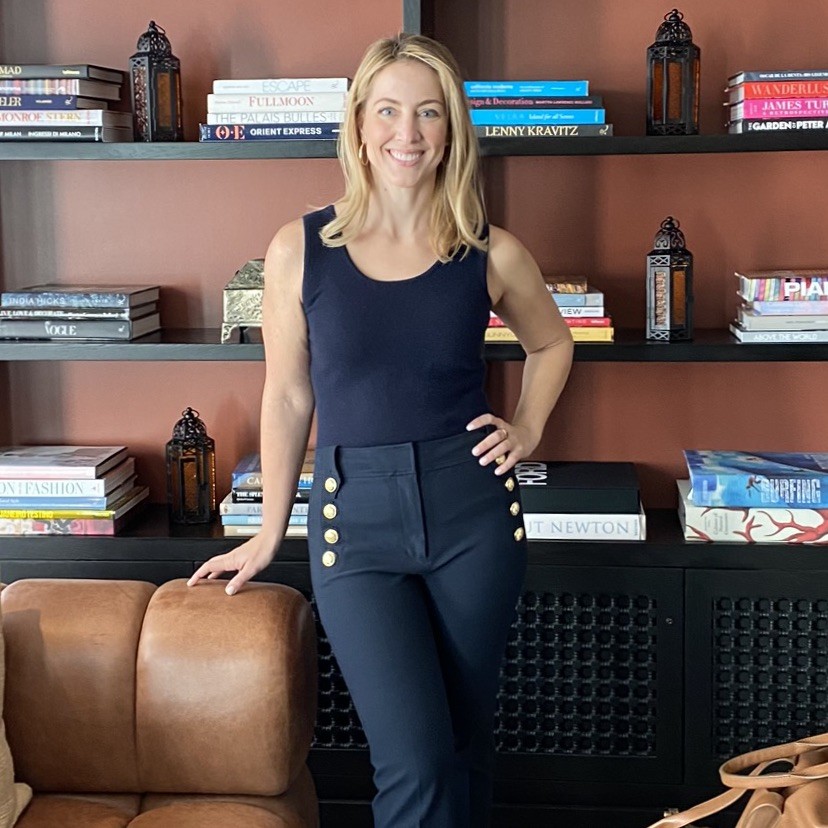
- Born: Pittsboro, Indiana
- Occupation: Lawyer
- Website: nikichristoff.com

Niki Christoff is an American lawyer and business executive who is CEO of Christoff & Co, a D.C.-based consultancy firm. She is best known for serving on John McCain's 2008 presidential campaign.

== Biography ==
Christoff was born and raised in Pittsboro, Indiana. She graduated magna cum laude from Harvard College in 2000 and earned a J.D. from Harvard Law School in 2003. Based in Washington D.C., she worked for Republican pollster Frank Luntz before joining Senator John McCain's Straight Talk America PAC in 2006. She later joined the presidential campaign full-time to work on the public policy team. Christoff left the Republican party and registered as an independent in 2017. In 2020, she helped lead a group of McCain team alums to endorse Joe Biden for president.

She has held senior positions at Google and Uber, and was previously the Senior Vice President of Strategy and Government Relations at Salesforce.

In May 2020, Salesforce CEO Marc Benioff fired Christoff for insubordination when she ignored company policy restricting external board service to the C-suite. The New York Times wrote, "Ms. Christoff's story highlights one of the biggest unspoken challenges facing companies' efforts to diversify their boards: Many of the nation's biggest companies don't allow their employees to join outside boards, especially not those below the senior-most ranks."

In September 2021, Tech'ed Up, a Beltway-based podcast from bWitched Media covering emerging trends in tech, launched with Christoff as host. Over 100 episodes, guests have included SEC Commissioner Hester Peirce, Senator Mark Warner, and The New York Times reporter Cecilia Kang.

== Recognition ==
In 2019, she was named by Fortune as one of the 25 Most Powerful Women in Politics. and was also recognized in Washington Life's 2019 list of Tech Innovators and Disruptors and a member of Tech's Frontline in Washington, D.C.

On March 10, 2020, Christoff was named a member of The Washington Post Technology 202 Network, described by the newspaper as "a panel of technology experts from across the government, the private sector and the consumer advocacy."
