= Montclair, Indiana =

- Unincorporated community
- Location within Indiana Location within the United States
- Coordinates: 39°50′53″N 86°34′01″W
- Country: United States
- State: Indiana
- County: Hendricks
- Township: Union
- Elevation: 961 ft (293 m)
- ZIP code: 46165
- FIPS code: 18-50598
- GNIS feature ID: 439352

Montclair is an unincorporated community in Union Township, Hendricks County, Indiana.

A post office was established at Montclair in 1880, and remained in operation until it was discontinued in 1929.

== Geography ==
Montclair is located at 39°50′53″N 86°34′01″W.
