= Peyton Hendershot =

American football player (born 1999)

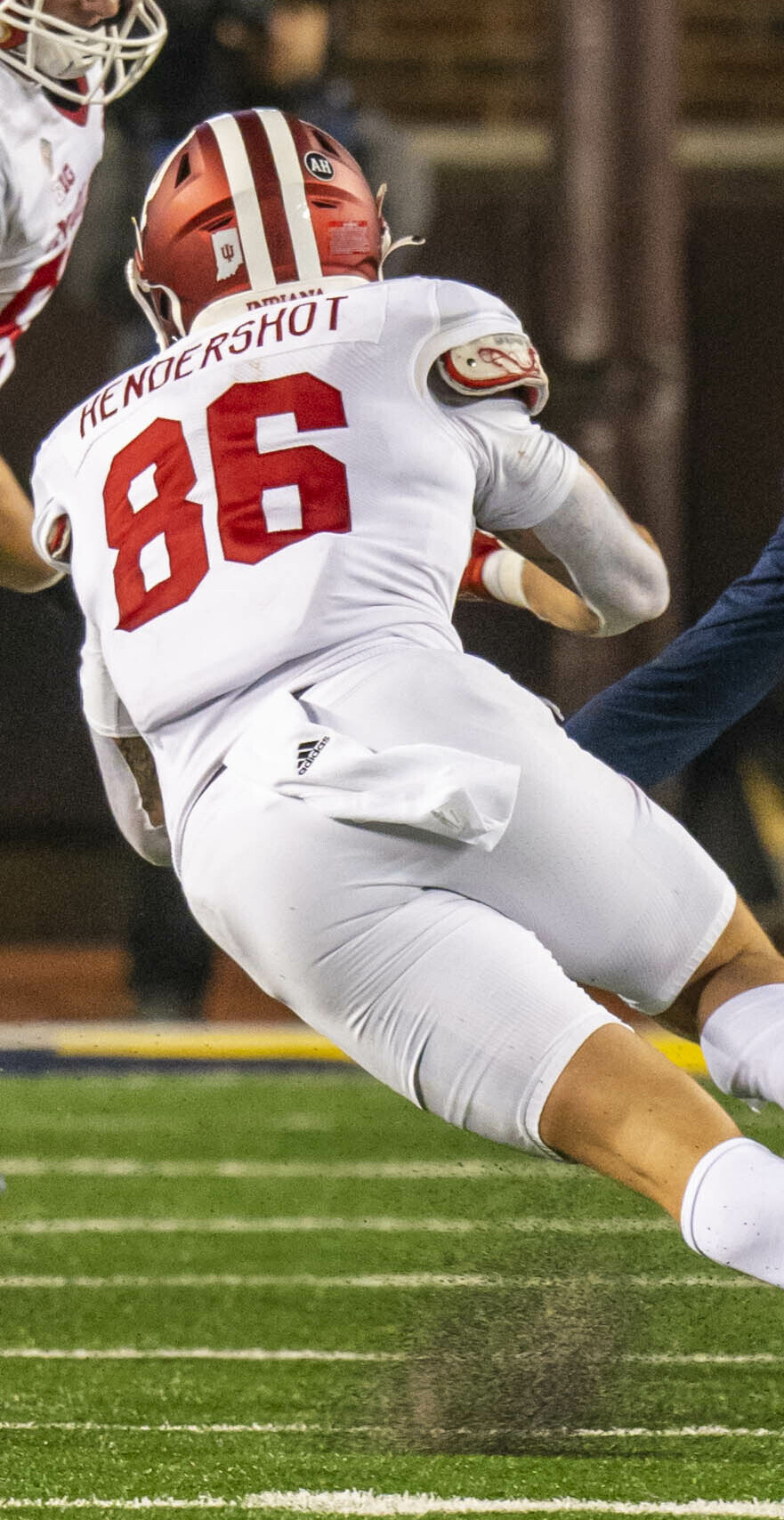
- Hendershot with the Indiana Hoosiers in 2021

Profile
- Position: Tight end

Personal information
- Born: April 23, 1999 (age 27); Lizton, Indiana, U.S.
- Listed height: 6 ft 4 in (1.93 m)
- Listed weight: 254 lb (115 kg)

Career information
- High school: Tri-West (Lizton, Indiana)
- College: Indiana (2018–2021)
- NFL draft: 2022: undrafted

Career history
- Dallas Cowboys (2022–2023); Kansas City Chiefs (2024); Dallas Renegades (2026)*
- * Offseason or practice squad member only

Awards and highlights
- Third-team All-Big Ten (2021)

Career NFL statistics
- Receptions: 20
- Receiving yards: 192
- Receiving touchdowns: 2
- Rushing yards: 2
- Rushing average: 1
- Rushing touchdowns: 1
- Stats at Pro Football Reference

Peyton Hendershot (born April 23, 1999) is an American professional football tight end. He played college football for the Indiana Hoosiers.

== Early life ==
Hendershot attended Tri-West Hendricks High School in Lizton, Indiana. As a sophomore, he contributed to the team winning the 2014 3A state championship.

As a junior, he was a two-way player at tight end and defensive end, posting 51 receptions for 685 yards, eight touchdowns, 30 tackles (five for loss), four sacks and three pass breakups.

As a senior, he tallied 67 receptions for 896 yards and nine touchdowns. He finished high school with 157 catches for 2,170 yards and 22 touchdowns. He received All-county, All-conference, 6A All-state, Indiana Football Coaches Association Top 50 and Indianapolis Star position award winner (tight end) honors.

He also practiced basketball, where he averaged 12.9 points, 10.5 rebounds, 4.3 assists, 1.3 steals, and 0.9 blocks as a junior.

== College career ==
Hendershot accepted a football scholarship from Indiana University Bloomington. As a true freshman in 2017, he appeared in the first four games as a backup tight end, before suffering a season-ending injury and being medical redshirted.

As a redshirt freshman in 2018, he started in 10 out of 11 games while rotating with tight end Austin Dorris. He posted 15 receptions for 163 yards and two touchdowns. He had two receptions for 47 yards against Rutgers University.

As a sophomore in 2019, he started all 13 games, setting the school's single-season tight end record with 52 catches for 622 yards. He recorded seven contests with 50-or-more yards and six games with five-or-more catches. He had four receptions for 70 yards and one touchdown against Ohio State University. He made six receptions for 95 yards against the University of Maryland. He had seven receptions for 51 yards against Penn State University.

As a junior in 2020, he started all eight games in a season that was reduced by the COVID-19 pandemic. His production dropped after battling injuries, posting 23 receptions (third on the team), 151 yards (third on the team) and four receiving touchdowns (second on the team). He had six receptions for 34 yards and his first career two-touchdown contest against Rutgers University. He made four receptions for 31 yards and one touchdown in 38–21 win against the No. 23 ranked University of Michigan.

In February 2020, he was arrested and charged with felony residential entry, misdemeanor domestic battery, misdemeanor criminal conversion and misdemeanor criminal mischief. On June 9, 2020, Jon Blau reported via social media that he pleaded guilty to criminal trespass, a Class A misdemeanor. Three other charges, including domestic battery, were dismissed as part of his plea agreement. He was required to get a mental health evaluation and complete a batterers treatment program. Sentence also came with one year probation.

As a senior in 2021, he started all 12 games, catching passes from starting quarterback Michael Penix Jr. He registered 46 receptions (tied for team lead), 543 receiving yards (led the team), four touchdowns (third in school history for tight ends), one two-point conversion, two carries for eight yards and three special teams tackles. He had seven receptions for 100 yards against Western Kentucky University. He collected five receptions for 80 yards against Penn State University. He made six receptions for 106 yards and two touchdowns against the University of Maryland, becoming the first tight end in school history to have two receiving 100-yard games. He earned third-team All-Big Ten honors.

He appeared in 32 games, finishing as the school's career leader for tight ends with 136 receptions for 1,479 yards while ranking second with 14 receiving touchdowns.

== Professional career ==
Pre-draft measurables
Height	Weight	Arm length	Hand span	Wingspan	40-yard dash	10-yard split	20-yard split	20-yard shuttle	Three-cone drill	Vertical jump	Broad jump	Bench press
6 ft 4 1/8 in (1.93 m)	250 lb (113 kg)	32 5/8 in (0.83 m)	9 in (0.23 m)	6 ft 8 1/8 in (2.04 m)	4.78 s	1.62 s	2.72 s	4.25 s	6.91 s	35.5 in (0.90 m)	9 ft 9 in (2.97 m)	23 reps
All values from NFL Combine/Pro Day

=== Dallas Cowboys ===
Hendershot was signed as an undrafted free agent by the Dallas Cowboys after the 2022 NFL draft on April 30. He made the initial 53-man roster out of training camp as the team's third-string tight end, behind Dalton Schultz and fellow rookie Jake Ferguson. In Week 7 of the 2022 season, he scored his first NFL touchdown on a two-yard reception in the 24–6 victory over the Detroit Lions. As a rookie, he appeared in all 17 games and started two, while recording 11 receptions for 103 yards, two touchdowns and three special teams tackles.

In 2023, although previous starter Schultz left in free agency, the drafting in the second-round of Luke Schoonmaker, put Hendershot in a difficult situation to improve his position on the depth chart. He was the team's third-string tight end behind starter Ferguson and Schoonmaker. He suffered an ankle injury in Week 3 and was placed on injured reserve on October 12, 2023. He was activated on December 6. He appeared in eight games with one start, registering four receptions for 38 yards. Although he fought to return to play, his ankle injury was serious enough to require offseason surgery.

=== Kansas City Chiefs ===
Hendershot was traded to the Kansas City Chiefs in exchange for a 2026 conditional seventh-round pick on August 27, 2024. On September 17, Hendershot was waived by Kansas City, and re-signed to the practice squad. He was promoted to the active roster on November 2, 2024. On November 26, 2024, Hendershot was placed on injured reserve. He was activated from injured reserve on December 23, 2024. He appeared in seven games as a backup and had five receptions for 51 yards. He played in all three of the Chiefs' playoff games. He was not re-signed after the season.

=== Dallas Renegades ===
On January 13, 2026, Hendershot was selected by the Dallas Renegades in the 2026 UFL Draft. He was released on March 19.

== Career statistics ==
=== NFL ===
==== Regular season ====
Year	Team	Games		Receiving					Rushing					Fumbles	
Year	Team	GP	GS	Rec	Yds	Avg	Lng	TD	Att	Yds	Avg	Lng	TD	Fum	Lost
2022	DAL	17	2	11	103	9.4	29	2	1	2	2.0	2	1	1	0
2023	DAL	8	1	4	38	9.5	24	0	1	0	0.0	0	0	0	0
2024	KC	7	1	5	51	10.2	15	0	0	0	0.0	0	0	0	0
Career		32	4	20	192	9.6	29	2	2	2	1.0	2	1	1	0

==== Postseason ====
Year	Team	Games		Receiving					Rushing					Fumbles	
Year	Team	GP	GS	Rec	Yds	Avg	Lng	TD	Att	Yds	Avg	Lng	TD	Fum	Lost
2022	DAL	1	0	0	0	0.0	0	0	0	0	0.0	0	0	0	0
2023	DAL	1	0	0	0	0.0	0	0	0	0	0.0	0	0	0	0
2024	KC	1	0	0	0	0.0	0	0	0	0	0.0	0	0	0	0
Career		3	0	0	0	0.0	0	0	0	0	0.0	0	0	0	0

=== College ===
Season	Team	GP	Receiving			
Season	Team	GP	Rec	Yds	Avg	TD
2018	Indiana	10	15	163	10.9	2
2019	Indiana	13	52	622	12.0	4
2020	Indiana	8	23	151	6.6	4
2021	Indiana	12	46	543	11.8	4
Total		43	136	1,479	10.9	14
