= Milligan, Indiana =

Unincorporated community in Indiana, United States

- Unincorporated community
- Parke County's location in Indiana

- Location in Parke County
- Coordinates: 39°50′44″N 87°02′18″W
- Country: United States
- State: Indiana
- County: Parke
- Township: Greene
- Elevation: 794 ft (242 m)
- Time zone: UTC-5 (Eastern (EST))
  - Summer (DST): UTC-4 (EDT)
- ZIP code: 47872
- Area code: 765
- GNIS feature ID: 439238

Milligan, also called South Waveland, is an unincorporated community in Greene Township, Parke County, in the U.S. state of Indiana.

== History ==
A post office was established at Milligan in 1882, and remained in operation until 1957. The community was named for Joseph Milligan, a storekeeper.

== Geography ==
Milligan is located on Indiana State Road 236, at 39°50′44″N 87°02′18″W with an elevation of 794 feet.
