= Union Township, Hendricks County, Indiana =

Union Township
- Township
- Location in Hendricks County
- Coordinates: 39°52′45″N 86°32′35″W
- Country: United States
- State: Indiana
- County: Hendricks

Government
  - Type: Indiana township

Area
  - Total: 24.05 sq mi (62.28 km^{2})
  - Land: 24.03 sq mi (62.25 km^{2})
  - Water: 0.012 sq mi (0.03 km^{2}) 0.05%
- Elevation: 928 ft (283 m)

Population (2020)
  - Total: 1,818
  - Density: 77/sq mi (29.8/km^{2})
- GNIS feature ID: 0453917

Union Township is one of twelve townships in Hendricks County, Indiana, United States. As of the 2010 census, its population was 1,856.

== Geography ==
Union Township covers an area of 24.05 square miles (62.3 km^{2}); of this, 0.01 square miles (0.026 km^{2}) or 0.05 percent is water.

=== Cities and towns ===
- Lizton

=== Unincorporated towns ===
- Montclair
- Raintown

(This list is based on USGS data and may include former settlements.)

=== Adjacent townships ===
- Harrison Township, Boone County (northeast)
- Middle Township (east)
- Center Township (south)
- Eel River Township (west)
- Jackson Township, Boone County (northwest)

=== Cemeteries ===
The township contains nine cemeteries: Burgess, Cundiff, Groover, Leach Number 1, Leach Number 2, Lizton K of P, Montgomery, Pritchett and Vieley.

=== Major highways ===
- Interstate 74
- U.S. Route 136
- Indiana State Road 39

== Education ==
It is in the North West Hendricks School Corporation.
