= Middle Township, Hendricks County, Indiana =

Middle Township
- Township
- Location in Hendricks County
- Coordinates: 39°51′54″N 86°28′10″W
- Country: United States
- State: Indiana
- County: Hendricks

Government
  - Type: Indiana township

Area
  - Total: 31.10 sq mi (80.56 km^{2})
  - Land: 31.09 sq mi (80.53 km^{2})
  - Water: 0.012 sq mi (0.03 km^{2}) 0.04%
- Elevation: 942 ft (287 m)

Population (2020)
  - Total: 6,875
  - Density: 198/sq mi (76.6/km^{2})
- GNIS feature ID: 0453622

Middle Township is one of twelve townships in Hendricks County, Indiana, United States. As of the 2010 census, its population was 6,170.

== History ==
Middle Township was organized in 1833.

== Geography ==
Middle Township covers an area of 31.11 square miles (80.6 km^{2}); of this, 0.01 square miles (0.026 km^{2}) or 0.04 percent is water.

=== Cities and towns ===
- Brownsburg (west edge)
- Pittsboro

=== Unincorporated towns ===
- Maplewood
- Tilden

(This list is based on USGS data and may include former settlements.)

=== Adjacent townships ===
- Harrison Township, Boone County (north)
- Perry Township, Boone County (northeast)
- Brown Township (east)
- Lincoln Township (southeast)
- Washington Township (southeast)
- Center Township (southwest)
- Union Township (west)

=== Cemeteries ===
The township contains six cemeteries: Hughes, Long, Roberts, Saint Malachy West, Weaver and White Lick Baptist.

=== Major highways ===
- Interstate 74
- U.S. Route 136

== Education ==
It is in the North West Hendricks School Corporation.
