= Lizton, Indiana =

- Town
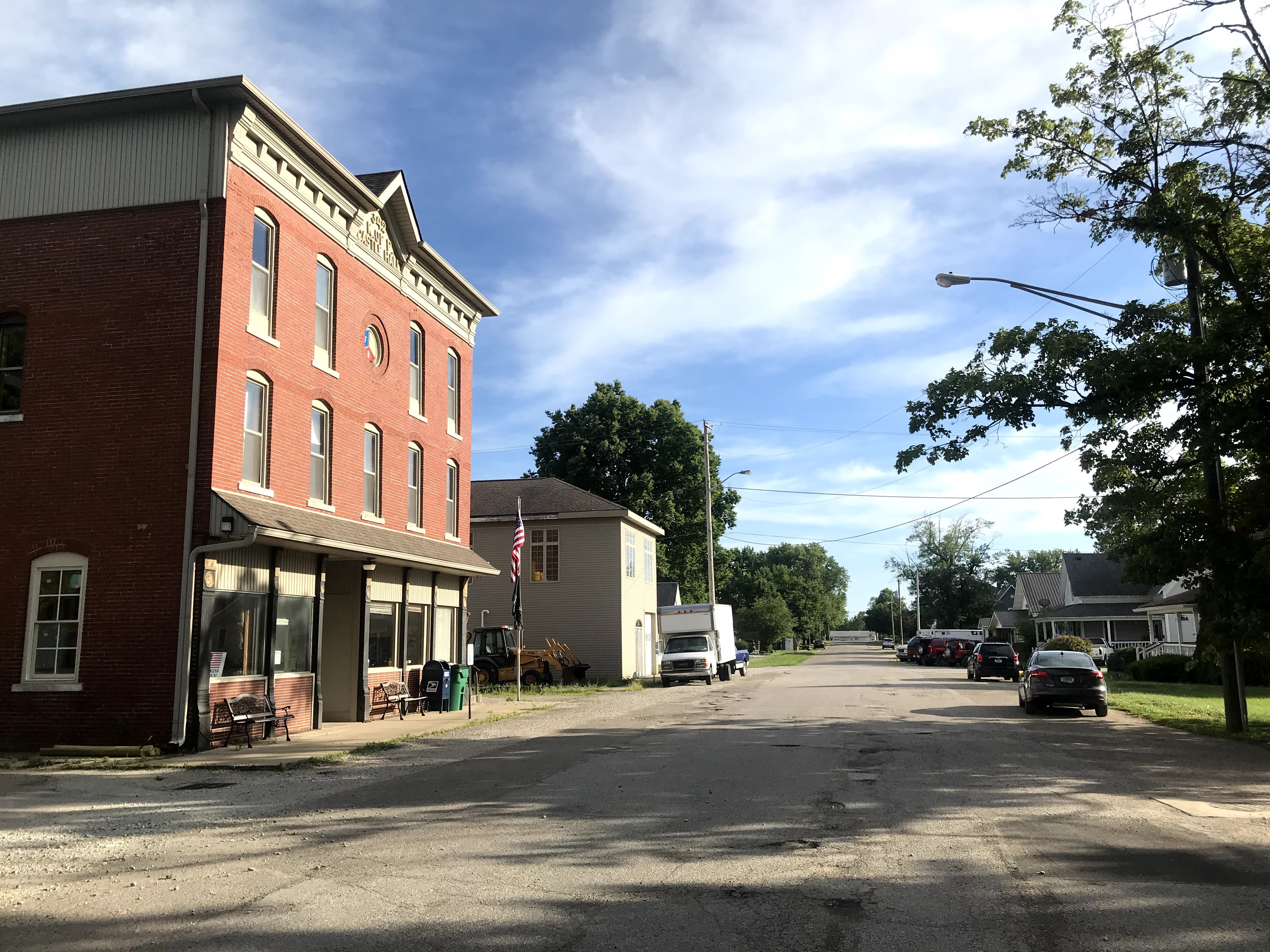
- Downtown Lizton

- Seal
- Nickname: "The only Lizton in the world"
- Location of Lizton in Hendricks County, Indiana.
- Coordinates: 39°52′45″N 86°32′25″W
- Country: United States
- State: Indiana
- County: Hendricks
- Township: Union
- Established: 1851

Area
  - Total: 0.66 sq mi (1.72 km^{2})
  - Land: 0.66 sq mi (1.72 km^{2})
  - Water: 0 sq mi (0.00 km^{2})
- Elevation: 948 ft (289 m)

Population (2020)
  - Total: 511
  - Density: 770.7/sq mi (297.58/km^{2})
- Time zone: UTC-5 (Eastern (EST))
  - Summer (DST): UTC-4 (EDT)
- ZIP code: 46149
- Area code: 317
- FIPS code: 18-44442
- GNIS feature ID: 2396721
- Website: www.townoflizton.com

Lizton is a town in Union Township, Hendricks County, Indiana, United States. The population was 511 at the 2020 Census. It is one of the three towns (Pittsboro and North Salem being the other two) that make up North West Hendricks School Corporation.

== History ==
Lizton was originally called New Elizabeth, and under the latter name was laid out in 1837 by Jesse Veiley, and named for his wife, Elizabeth.

The post office was established as New Elizabeth in 1854, and was renamed Lizton in 1873. According to one source, the name may have been changed by the railroad.

== Geography ==
According to the 2010 census, Lizton has a total area of 0.57 square miles (1.48 km^{2}), all land.

== Demographics ==
Historical population
Census	Pop.	Note	%±
1910	224		—
1920	182		−18.7%
1930	217		19.2%
1940	200		−7.8%
1950	276		38.0%
1960	366		32.6%
1970	397		8.5%
1980	456		14.9%
1990	410		−10.1%
2000	372		−9.3%
2010	488		31.2%
2020	511		4.7%
U.S. Decennial Census

=== 2010 census ===
As of the census of 2010, there were 488 people, 197 households, and 137 families living in the town. The population density was 856.1 inhabitants per square mile (330.5/km^{2}). There were 218 housing units at an average density of 382.5 per square mile (147.7/km^{2}). The racial makeup of the town was 97.3% White, 0.4% Asian, 0.8% from other races, and 1.4% from two or more races. Hispanic or Latino of any race were 1.4% of the population.

There were 197 households, of which 39.6% had children under the age of 18 living with them, 45.7% were married couples living together, 15.7% had a female householder with no husband present, 8.1% had a male householder with no wife present, and 30.5% were non-families. 26.4% of all households were made up of individuals, and 5.1% had someone living alone who was 65 years of age or older. The average household size was 2.48 and the average family size was 2.96.

The median age in the town was 32.1 years. 28.5% of residents were under the age of 18; 7% were between the ages of 18 and 24; 34.7% were from 25 to 44; 22.3% were from 45 to 64; and 7.6% were 65 years of age or older. The gender makeup of the town was 53.1% male and 46.9% female.

=== 2000 census ===
As of the census of 2000, there were 372 people, 161 households, and 100 families living in the town. The population density was 1,303.3 inhabitants per square mile (503.2/km^{2}). There were 180 housing units at an average density of 630.6 per square mile (243.5/km^{2}). The racial makeup of the town was 98.39% White, 0.27% African American, and 1.34% from two or more races.

There were 161 households, out of which 37.9% had children under the age of 18 living with them, 44.1% were married couples living together, 11.8% had a female householder with no husband present, and 37.3% were non-families. 33.5% of all households were made up of individuals, and 11.2% had someone living alone who was 65 years of age or older. The average household size was 2.31 and the average family size was 2.94.

In the town, the population was spread out, with 26.9% under the age of 18, 7.8% from 18 to 24, 36.3% from 25 to 44, 18.8% from 45 to 64, and 10.2% who were 65 years of age or older. The median age was 33 years. For every 100 females, there were 96.8 males. For every 100 females age 18 and over, there were 94.3 males.

The median income for a household in the town was $40,694, and the median income for a family was $55,313. Males had a median income of $36,023 versus $23,750 for females. The per capita income for the town was $20,269. About 3.0% of families and 3.1% of the population were below the poverty line, including 1.5% of those under age 18 and 3.6% of those age 65 or over.

== Education ==
It is in the North West Hendricks School Corporation.

Schools:

- Tri-West Hendricks High School
- Tri-West Middle School

Both schools are part of the school district.

== Notable people ==
- Adelle Davis, American activist and writer
- Peyton Hendershot, NFL tight end for the Kansas City Chiefs
- Jeff Gordon, NASCAR champion, lived in Lizton during his childhood through high school.
