= Jamestown, Indiana =

- Town
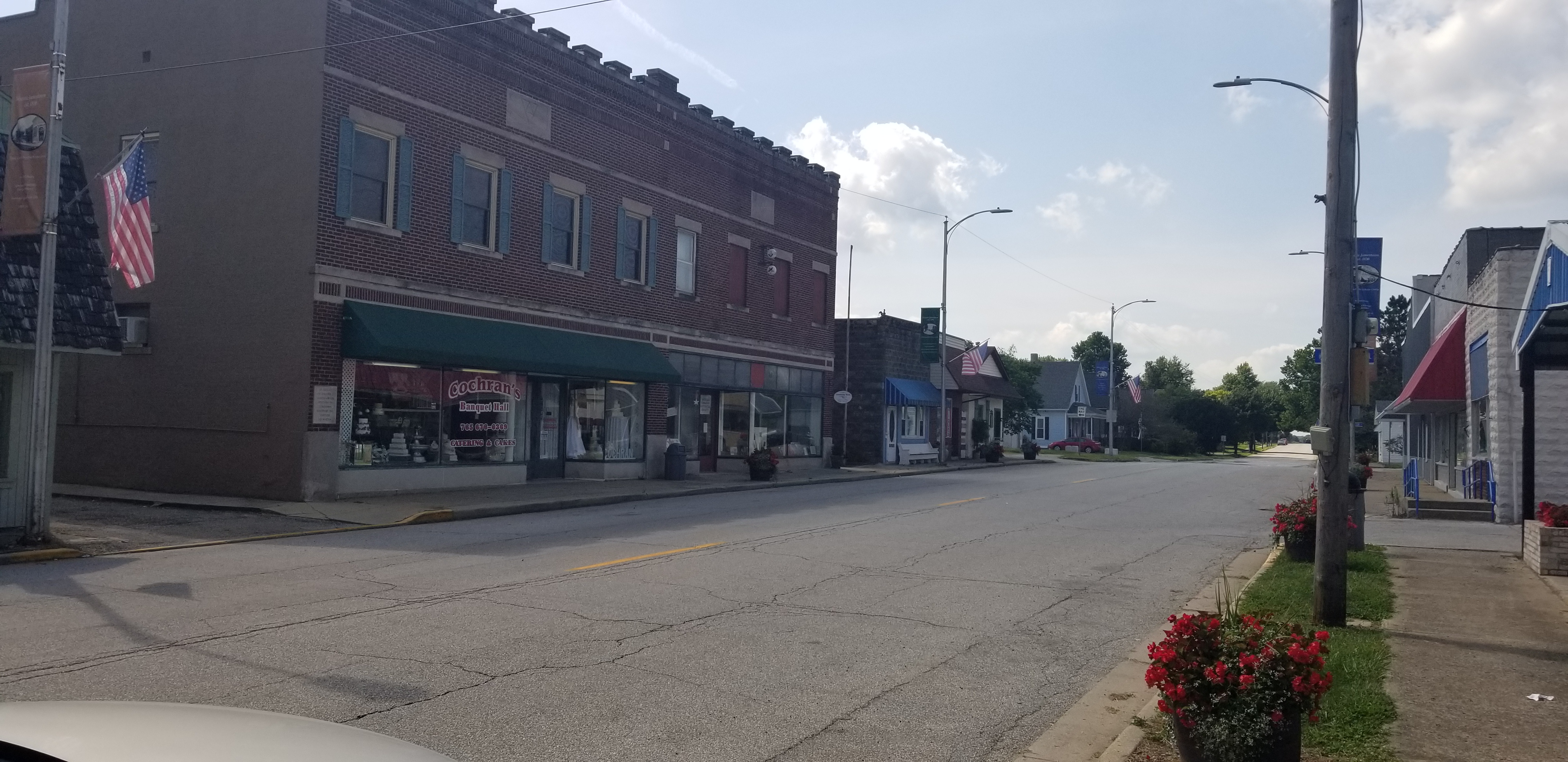
- Downtown Jamestown

- Logo

- Location of Jamestown in Boone County and Hendricks County, Indiana.
- Coordinates: 39°55′44″N 86°37′27″W
- Country: United States
- State: Indiana
- Counties: Boone, Hendricks
- Township: Jackson, Eel River
- Established: 1830

Area
  - Total: 0.90 sq mi (2.32 km^{2})
  - Land: 0.90 sq mi (2.32 km^{2})
  - Water: 0 sq mi (0.00 km^{2})
- Elevation: 951 ft (290 m)

Population (2020)
  - Total: 942
  - Density: 1,052.1/sq mi (406.22/km^{2})
- Time zone: UTC-5 (EST)
  - Summer (DST): UTC-4 (EDT)
- ZIP code: 46147
- Area code: 765
- FIPS code: 18-37692
- GNIS feature ID: 2397010
- Website: www.in.gov/towns/jamestown/

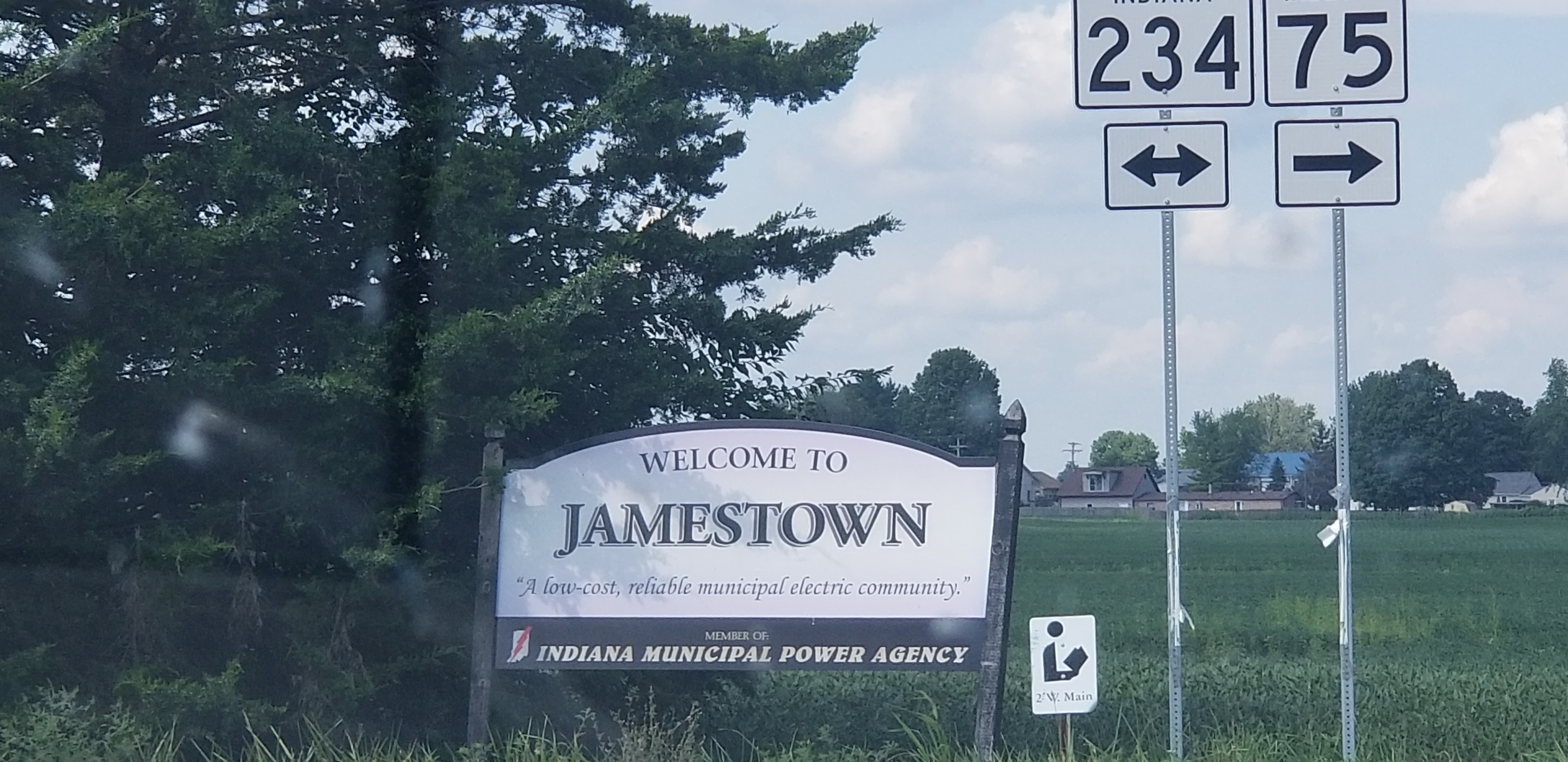
Welcome to Jamestown

Jamestown is a town in Jackson Township, Boone County and Eel River Township, Hendricks County, Indiana, United States. The population was 942 at the 2020 census.

== History ==
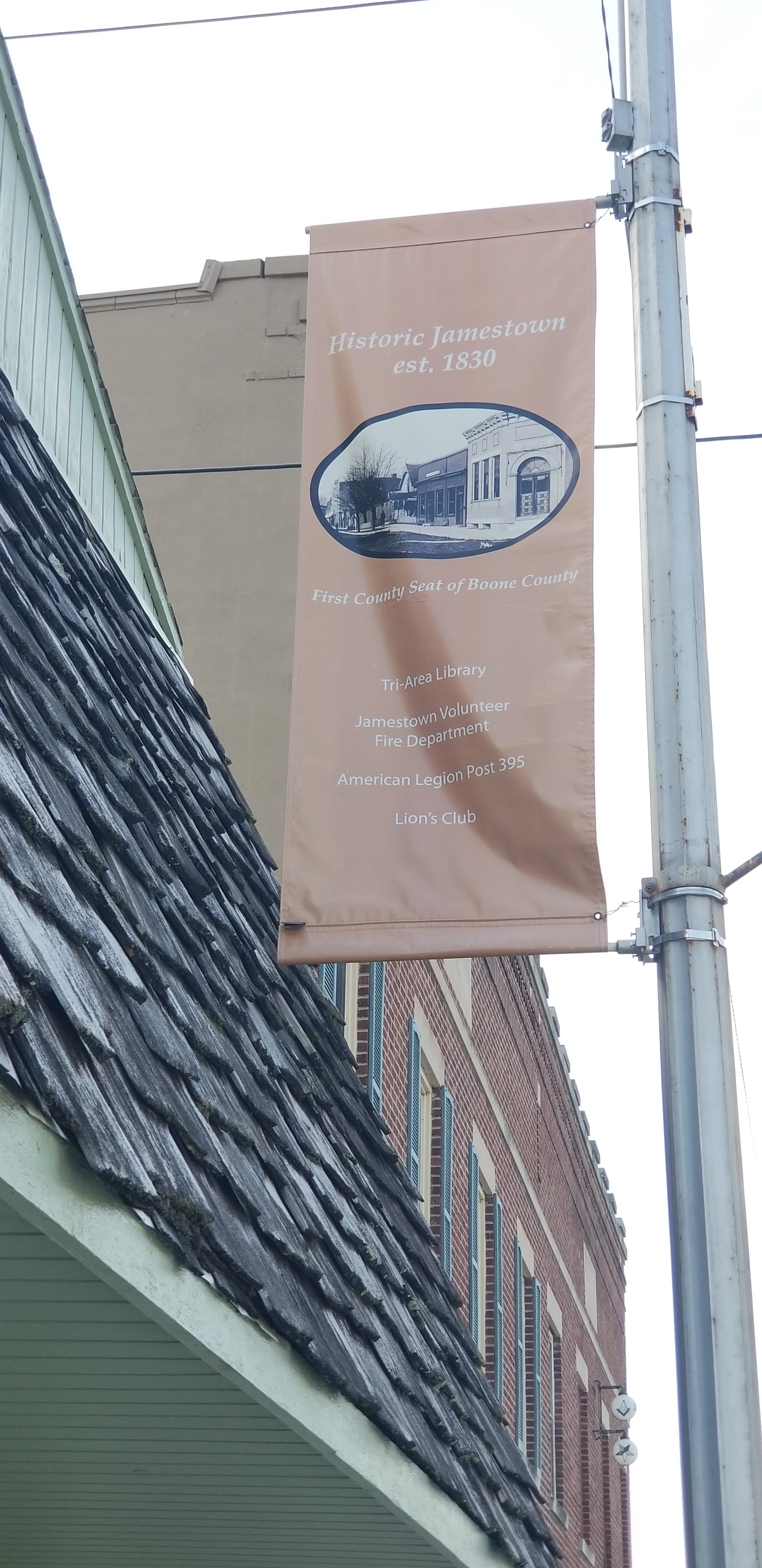
Historic Jamestown sign

Jamestown was established in 1830, and was platted in 1832. The town was named for its founder, James Mattock.

The town served as the original county seat of Boone County until 1831 when the legislature required that the county seat be moved towards the center of the district. In 1869, the Indianapolis, Bloomington and Western Railway (Later the Peoria and Eastern) came through the center of town on what was then Washington Street. The railroad remains today as the CSX Crawfordsville Sub and is the mainline from Indianapolis and Avon to Chicago. Additionally, Terre Haute, Indianapolis and Eastern Traction Company operated interurban service through Jamestown beginning in 1912 until its demise adjacent to the Big Four railroad, the remnants still being visible north of the railroad right of way.

== Geography ==
According to the 2010 census, Jamestown has a total area of 0.88 square miles (2.28 km^{2}), all land.

== Demographics ==
Historical population
Census	Pop.	Note	%±
1870	603		—
1880	696		15.4%
1890	616		−11.5%
1900	640		3.9%
1910	690		7.8%
1920	628		−9.0%
1930	552		−12.1%
1940	583		5.6%
1950	718		23.2%
1960	827		15.2%
1970	938		13.4%
1980	924		−1.5%
1990	764		−17.3%
2000	886		16.0%
2010	958		8.1%
2020	942		−1.7%
US Decennial Census

=== 2010 census ===
As of the 2010 United States census, there were 958 people, 394 households, and 261 families in the town. The population density was 1,088.6 inhabitants per square mile (420.3/km^{2}). There were 418 housing units at an average density of 475.0 per square mile (183.4/km^{2}). The racial makeup of the town was 98.9% White, 0.5% Asian, and 0.6% from two or more races. Hispanic or Latino of any race were 0.7% of the population.

There were 394 households, of which 34.5% had children under the age of 18 living with them, 49.2% were married couples living together, 11.9% had a female householder with no husband present, 5.1% had a male householder with no wife present, and 33.8% were non-families. 28.4% of all households were made up of individuals, and 11.4% had someone living alone who was 65 years of age or older. The average household size was 2.43 and the average family size was 2.95.

The median age in the town was 36.5 years. 26.6% of residents were under the age of 18; 7.4% were between the ages of 18 and 24; 27.7% were from 25 to 44; 26.6% were from 45 to 64; and 11.7% were 65 years of age or older. The gender makeup of the town was 46.8% male and 53.2% female.

=== 2000 census ===
As of the 2000 United States census, there were 886 people, 361 households, and 254 families in the town. The population density was 1,717.6 inhabitants per square mile (663.2/km^{2}). There were 382 housing units at an average density of 740.5 per square mile (285.9/km^{2}). The racial makeup of the town was 99.55% White, 0.23% African American, 0.11% from other races, and 0.11% from two or more races. Hispanic or Latino of any race were 0.56% of the population.

There were 361 households, out of which 32.7% had children under the age of 18 living with them, 60.7% were married couples living together, 8.6% had a female householder with no husband present, and 29.4% were non-families. 24.7% of all households were made up of individuals, and 9.1% had someone living alone who was 65 years of age or older. The average household size was 2.45 and the average family size was 2.94.

In the town, the population was spread out, with 24.9% under the age of 18, 7.0% from 18 to 24, 32.1% from 25 to 44, 23.1% from 45 to 64, and 12.9% who were 65 years of age or older. The median age was 36 years. For every 100 females, there were 98.2 males. For every 100 females age 18 and over, there were 93.3 males.

The median income for a household in the town was $46,250, and the median income for a family was $53,611. Males had a median income of $37,431 versus $24,271 for females. The per capita income for the town was $19,821. About 7.3% of families and 7.8% of the population were below the poverty line, including 8.5% of those under age 18 and 13.4% of those age 65 or over.

== Government ==
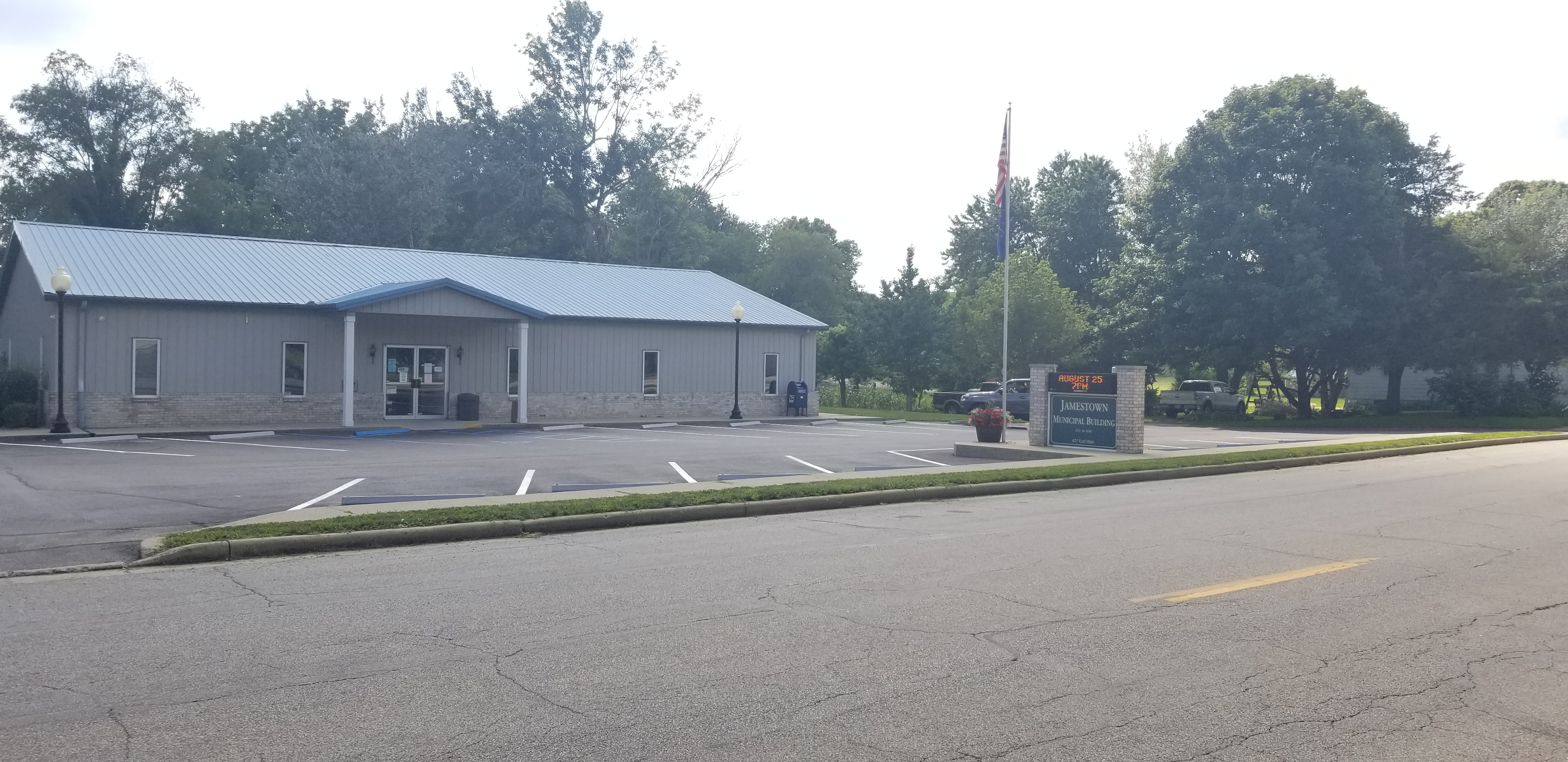
Jamestown Municipal Building

The town is managed by a three-member elected town council and an elected Clerk-Treasurer. The town provides police and fire service through two full-time Marshals and a volunteer fire department. Jamestown Municipal Utilities provide water, sewer, and power service.

== Education ==
The portion in Boone County is in the Western Boone Community School Corporation. The portion in Hendricks County is in the Northwest Hendricks School Corporation (Tri-West). The Northwest Hendricks district's comprehensive high school is Tri-West Hendricks High School.

The town has a lending library, the Tri-Area Library.

== Notable people ==
- Davey Hamilton, American racecar driver who competed in the Indianapolis 500
- Herman B Wells, 11th President of Indiana University
