= North Salem, Indiana =

- Town
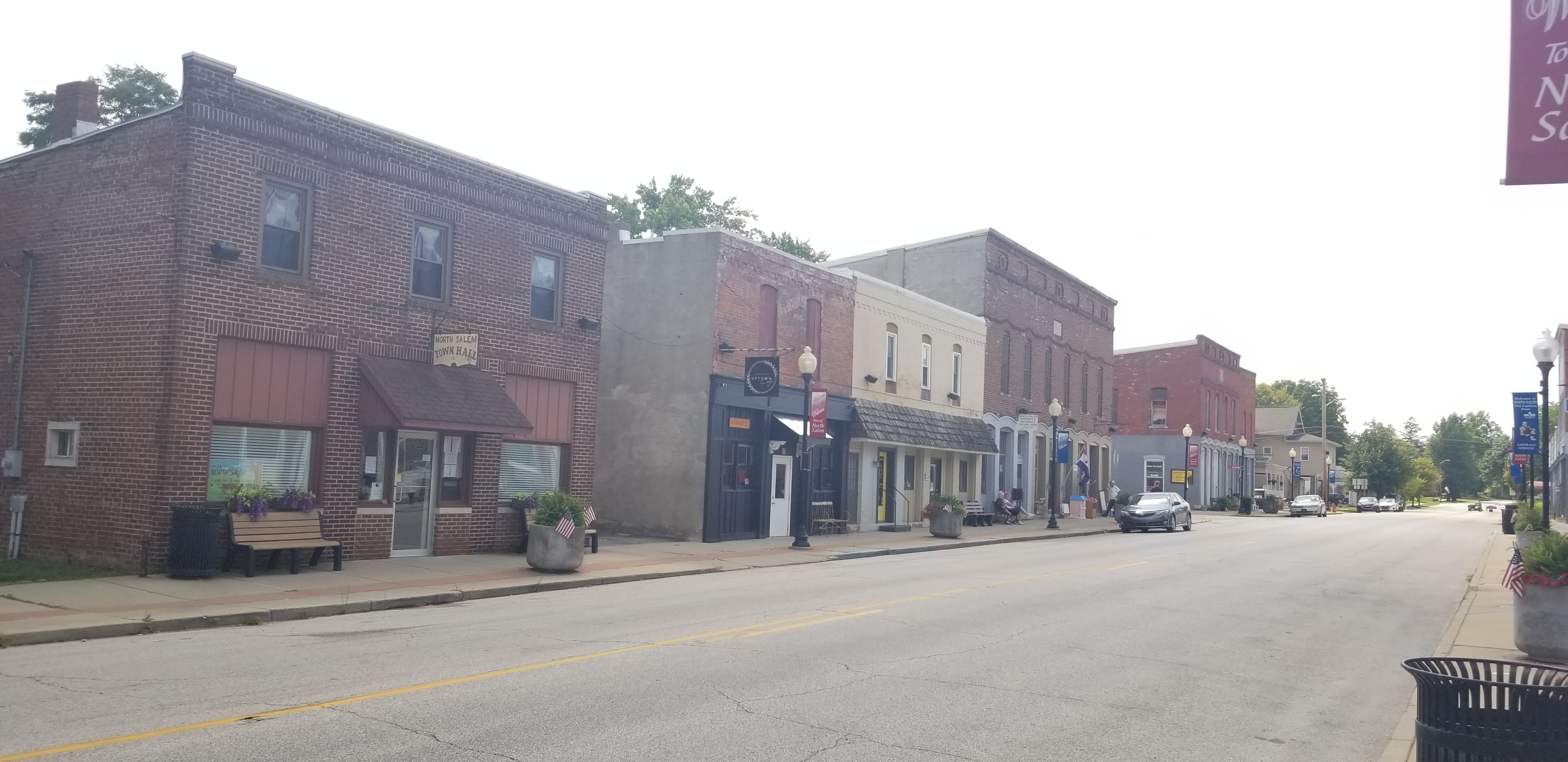

- Logo

- Location of North Salem in Hendricks County, Indiana.
- Coordinates: 39°51′36″N 86°38′38″W
- Country: United States
- State: Indiana
- County: Hendricks
- Township: Eel River
- Established: December 10, 1835
- Incorporated: 1899

Area
  - Total: 0.34 sq mi (0.89 km^{2})
  - Land: 0.34 sq mi (0.89 km^{2})
  - Water: 0 sq mi (0.00 km^{2})
- Elevation: 896 ft (273 m)

Population (2020)
  - Total: 464
  - Density: 1,352.4/sq mi (522.16/km^{2})
- Time zone: UTC-5 (Eastern (EST))
  - Summer (DST): UTC-4 (EDT)
- ZIP code: 46165
- Area code: 765
- FIPS code: 18-55080
- GNIS feature ID: 2396823
- Website: www.townofnorthsalem.org

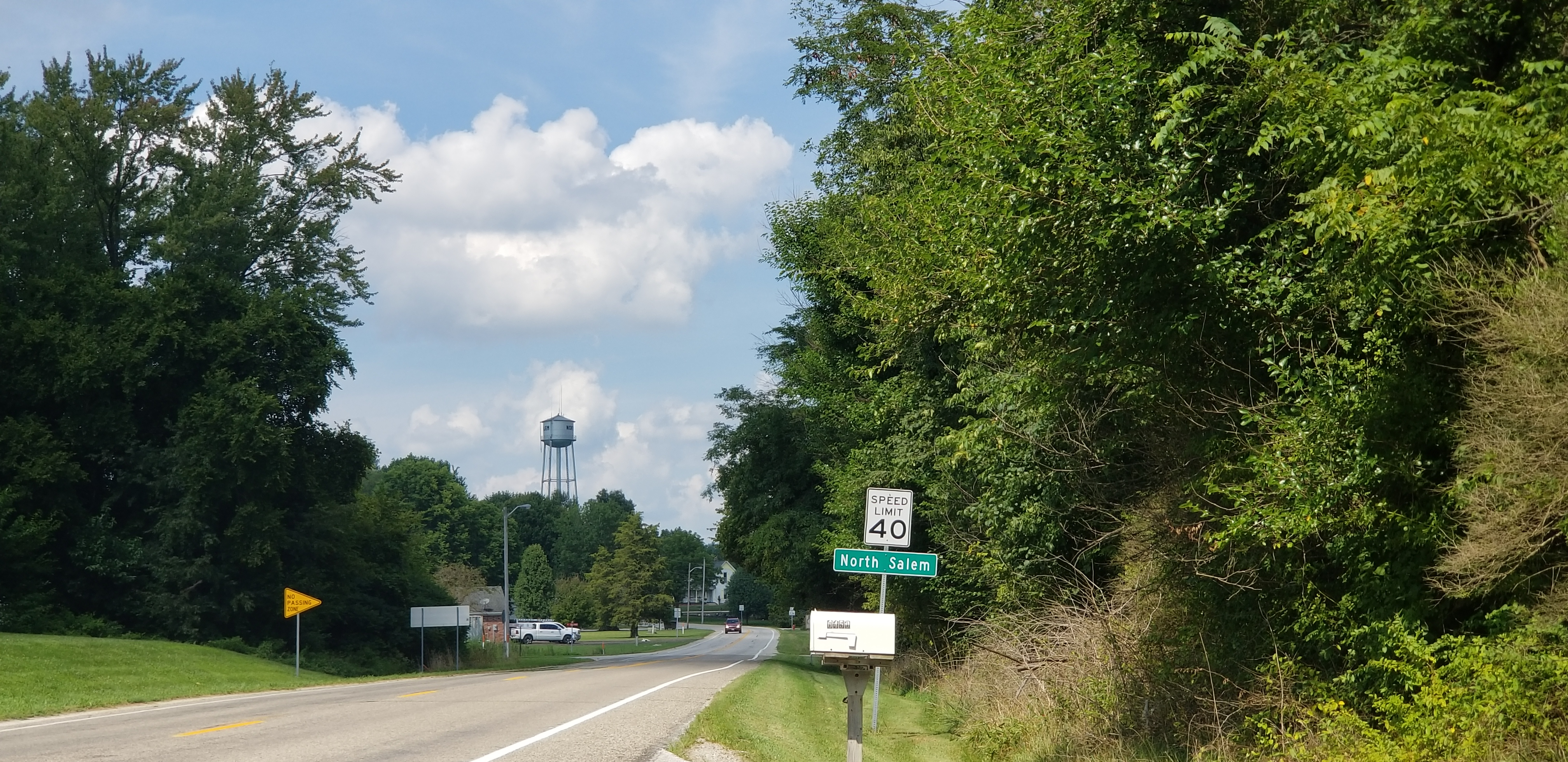
North Salem sign and water tower

North Salem is a town in Eel River Township, Hendricks County, Indiana, United States. The population was 464 at the 2020 Census.

== History ==
North Salem was laid out in 1835. A post office was established at North Salem in 1839. North Salem was incorporated as a town in 1899.

== Geography ==
According to the 2010 census, North Salem has a total area of 0.26 square miles (0.67 km^{2}), all land.

The nearby waterways Eel River and Big Walnut Creek offer ample fishing and scenery.

The surrounding land consists of low flat farmland to the east and deep ravines and woodland to the west.

== Demographics ==
Historical population
Census	Pop.	Note	%±
1860	160		—
1870	261		63.1%
1880	358		37.2%
1890	505		41.1%
1900	599		18.6%
1910	569		−5.0%
1920	595		4.6%
1930	466		−21.7%
1940	511		9.7%
1950	544		6.5%
1960	626		15.1%
1970	601		−4.0%
1980	581		−3.3%
1990	499		−14.1%
2000	591		18.4%
2010	518		−12.4%
2020	464		−10.4%
U.S. Decennial Census

=== 2010 census ===
As of the census of 2010, there were 518 people, 209 households, and 141 families living in the town. The population density was 1,992.3 inhabitants per square mile (769.2/km^{2}). There were 226 housing units at an average density of 869.2 per square mile (335.6/km^{2}). The racial makeup of the town was 98.1% White, 0.2% African American, 0.4% Asian, 0.2% from other races, and 1.2% from two or more races. Hispanic or Latino of any race were 0.6% of the population.

There were 209 households, of which 30.6% had children under the age of 18 living with them, 50.2% were married couples living together, 11.0% had a female householder with no husband present, 6.2% had a male householder with no wife present, and 32.5% were non-families. 26.3% of all households were made up of individuals, and 13.4% had someone living alone who was 65 years of age or older. The average household size was 2.48 and the average family size was 2.96.

The median age in the town was 39.9 years. 23.9% of residents were under the age of 18; 8.4% were between the ages of 18 and 24; 25.9% were from 25 to 44; 28.8% were from 45 to 64; and 13.1% were 65 years of age or older. The gender makeup of the town was 50.4% male and 49.6% female.

=== 2000 census ===
As of the census of 2000, there were 591 people, 223 households, and 159 families living in the town. The population density was 1,970 inhabitants per square mile (760/km^{2}). There were 231 housing units at an average density of 880.1 per square mile (339.8/km^{2}). The racial makeup of the town was 98.82% White, 0.17% Native American, 0.68% Asian, and 0.34% from two or more races. Hispanic or Latino of any race were 0.17% of the population.

There were 223 households, out of which 40.8% had children under the age of 18 living with them, 54.3% were married couples living together, 12.6% had a female householder with no husband present, and 28.3% were non-families. 23.8% of all households were made up of individuals, and 13.0% had someone living alone who was 65 years of age or older. The average household size was 2.65 and the average family size was 3.11.

In the town, the population was spread out, with 31.1% under the age of 18, 6.4% from 18 to 24, 30.3% from 25 to 44, 20.5% from 45 to 64, and 11.7% who were 65 years of age or older. The median age was 33 years. For every 100 females, there were 92.5 males. For every 100 females age 18 and over, there were 89.3 males.

The median income for a household in the town was $36,923, and the median income for a family was $44,821. Males had a median income of $35,156 versus $23,295 for females. The per capita income for the town was $18,034. About 6.8% of families and 9.1% of the population were below the poverty line, including 12.6% of those under age 18 and 7.4% of those age 65 or over.

== Old Fashion Days Festival ==
The “Old Fashion Days” Festival is a festival held in North Salem over Labor Day weekend for the last 43 years. This is the largest parade in Hendricks County. In 2020 the festival will celebrate its 45th anniversary and the town's 185th anniversary since establishment.

== Education ==
It is in the North West Hendricks School Corporation.

The town of North Salem is served by the North Salem Elementary School. This school is part of the North West Hendricks School Corporation.

The district's comprehensive high school is Tri-West Hendricks High School.

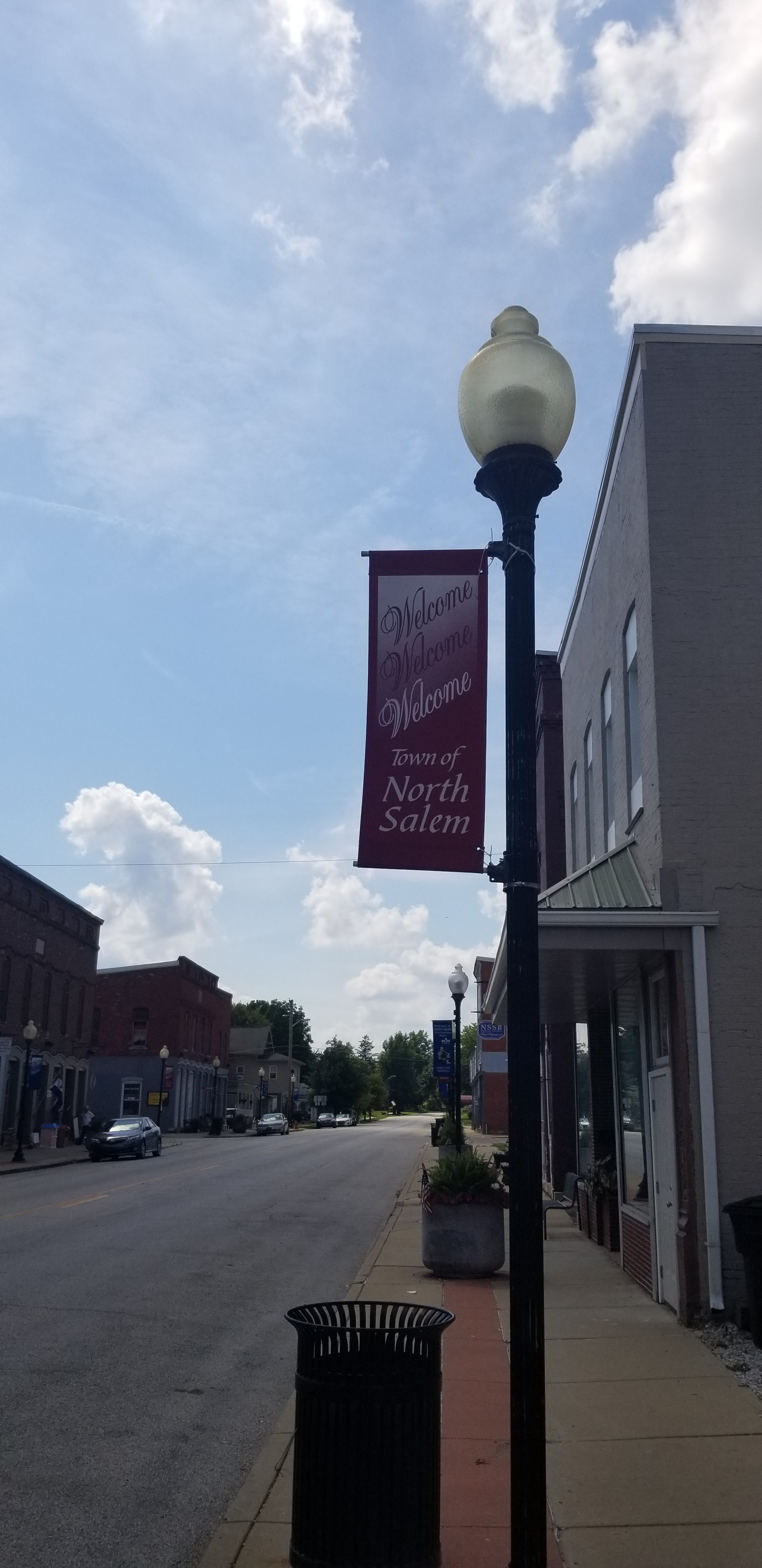
Sign welcoming visitors to North Salem

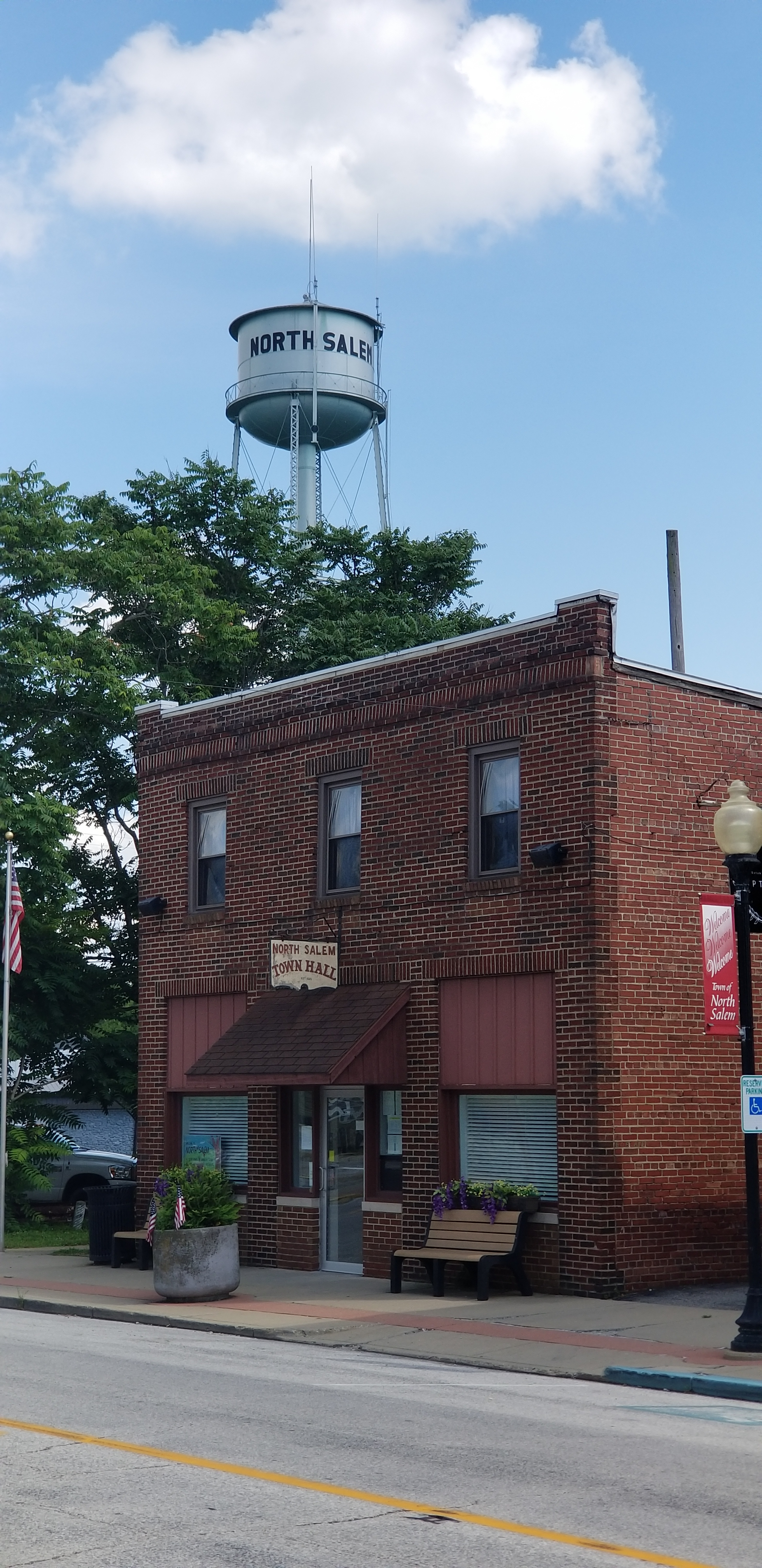
North Salem town hall and water tower
