= Mill Creek Community School Corporation =

School district in Indiana

Mill Creek Community School Corporation is a public school district in Hendricks County, Indiana.

The district is coextensive with Clay, Franklin, and Liberty townships. It includes Amo, Clayton, Coatesville, and Stilesville, as well as a small section of Plainfield.

== History ==
The formation of the Mill Creek Community School Corporation is the result of the 1964 consolidation of Clay, Franklin, and Liberty Township schools. Until that time, there was a friendly but heated rivalry that existed among the Amo, Clayton, and Stilesville High Schools. The consolidation of the township schools located in Amo, Belleville, Cartersburg, Clayton, Coatesville, Hazelwood, and Stilesville produced a higher quality education system, but also resulted in a loss of the history that was a significant part of the former schools and their associated towns.

When first consolidated, elementary schools in Amo, Clayton, Hazelwood, and Stilesville were organized. Cascade High School (incorporating the first letters of all three communities, Clayton, Amo, and Stilesville in the name) was also opened at that time. Eventually, Hazelwood and Stilesville elementary schools were closed, and Cascade Junior High School was opened next door to the high school.

== Geography ==
Mill Creek Community School District is an irregular shape but is generally located as follows:

- Northeast corner 39°43′06″N 86°26′17″W (39.430612, -86.261658).
- Northwest corner 39°43′01″N 86°41′14″W (39.430190, -86.411411).
- Southwest corner 39°36′06″N 86°39′23″W (39.360554, -86.392335).
- Southeast corner 39°36′03″N 86°27′56″W (39.360327, -86.275591).

== Schools ==
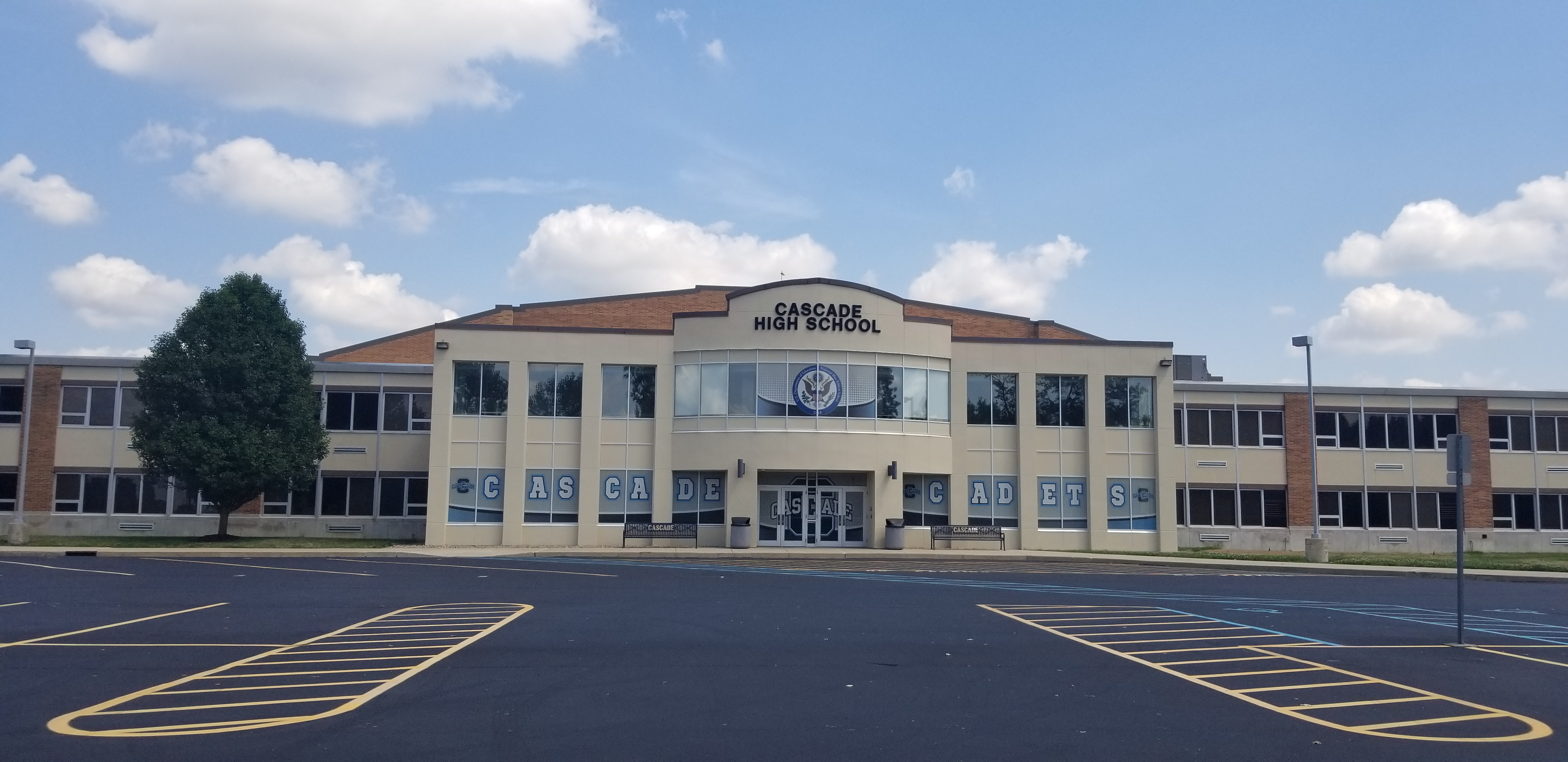
Cascade High School

The Mill Creek Community School Corporation consists of one high school, one middle school, and two elementary schools.

- Cascade High School
- Cascade Middle School
- Mill Creek East Elementary
- Mill Creek West Elementary
