= Hendricks County Flyer =

- Type: Weekly newspaper
- Format: Broadsheet
- Publisher: Beverly Joyce
- Editor: Kathy Linton
- Founded: 1965
- Ceased publication: May 15, 2019
- Headquarters: 8109 Kingston Street, Suite 500; Avon, Indiana 46123
- Website: www.flyergroup.com

The Hendricks County Flyer was a newspaper which began publishing in 1965 and ceased publication in May 2019. It was delivered every Wednesday and Saturday.

== About the Flyer ==
The Hendricks County Flyer focuses on community news with an emphasis on people, schools and local government and serves the towns of Amo, Avon, Brownsburg, Clayton, Coatesville, Danville, Lizton, North Salem, Pittsboro, Plainfield, and Stilesville.
