= List of railroad property on the National Register of Historic Places in Indiana =

This is a list of railway stations in the U.S. state of Indiana that are listed on the National Register of Historic Places (NRHP). The National Register of Historic Places is the United States federal government's official list of districts, sites, buildings, structures, and objects deemed worthy of preservation for their historical significance.

== A-L ==
- Amo
  - Amo THI & E Interurban Depot/Substation
- Beverly Shores
  - Beverly Shores South Shore Railroad Station
- Bloomington
  - Illinois Central Railroad Freight Depot
- Carmel
  - Carmel Monon Depot
- Chesterton
  - New York Central Railroad Passenger Depot
- Converse
  - Converse Depot
- Fort Wayne
  - Pennsylvania Railroad Station
- Gary
  - Union Station
- Griffith
  - Griffith Grand Trunk Depot
- Hobart
  - Pennsylvania Railroad Station
- Indianapolis
  - Indianapolis Union Station
- Jeffersonville
  - Spring Street Freight House
- Kokomo
  - Lake Erie and Western Depot Historic District
- Lafayette
  - Big Four Depot
- Linden
  - Linden Depot

== M-Z ==
- Martinsville
  - Martinsville Vandalia Depot
- Morristown
  - Junction Railroad Depot
- Muncie
  - Cincinnati, Richmond, & Muncie Depot
- New Haven
  - Craigville Depot
  - Nickel Plate 765
  - Wabash Railroad Depot
- Noblesville
  - Nickel Plate 587
- Plainfield
  - THI and E Interurban Depot-Substation
- Pleasant Lake
  - Pleasant Lake Depot
- Richmond
  - Richmond Railroad Station Historic District
- Scottsburg
  - Scottsburg Depot
- Seymour
  - Southern Indiana Railroad Freighthouse
- Union City
  - Union City Passenger Depot
