= North Belleville, Indiana =

Unincorporated community in Indiana, U.S.

Coordinates: 39°41′40″N 86°29′40″W

North Belleville was an unincorporated community in Hendricks County, Indiana, in the United States, centered around a rail station laying between Clayton to the west and Cartersburg to the east, and which is no longer extant. The location is north of Belleville, hence the name.
