= Cascade High School (Indiana) =

Cascade Senior High School

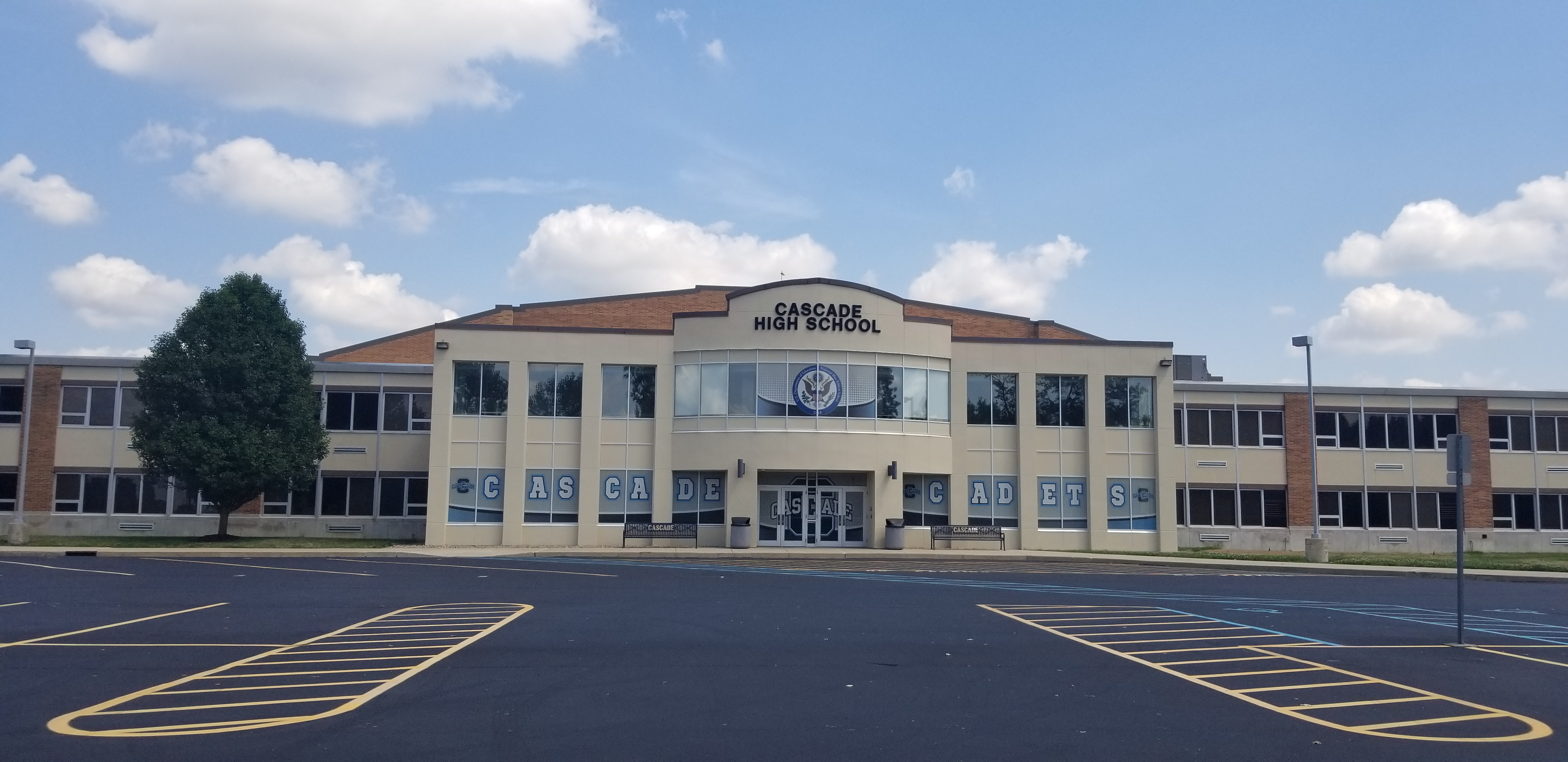
- Photo of the front of Cascade High School

Location
- 6565 South County Road 200 West; Clayton, Indiana 46118; United States; 39°39′54″N 86°33′36″W

Information
- Type: Public secondary school
- Established: 1964
- School district: Mill Creek Community School Corporation
- Principal: Jeff Hansel
- Teaching staff: 30.70 (on an FTE basis)
- Grades: 9–12
- Enrollment: 546 (2023–2024)
- Student to teacher ratio: 17.79
- Colors: Columbia blue and black
- Athletics conference: Indiana Crossroads Conference
- Nickname: Cadets
- Website: chs.mccsc.k12.in.us

Cascade High School is a public high school located in Liberty Township, Hendricks County, Indiana, with a Clayton postal address, and in proximity to Clayton. It serves grades 9–12 for the Mill Creek Community School Corporation.

The district includes Amo, Clayton, Coatesville, and Stilesville, as well as a small section of Plainfield.

== History ==
Cascade High School was established in 1964 as a consolidation of Clayton, Amo, and Stilesville High Schools.

== Demographics ==
21.4% of the students were eligible for free or reduced-cost lunch. For 2017–18, Cascade was a Title I school.

== Athletics ==
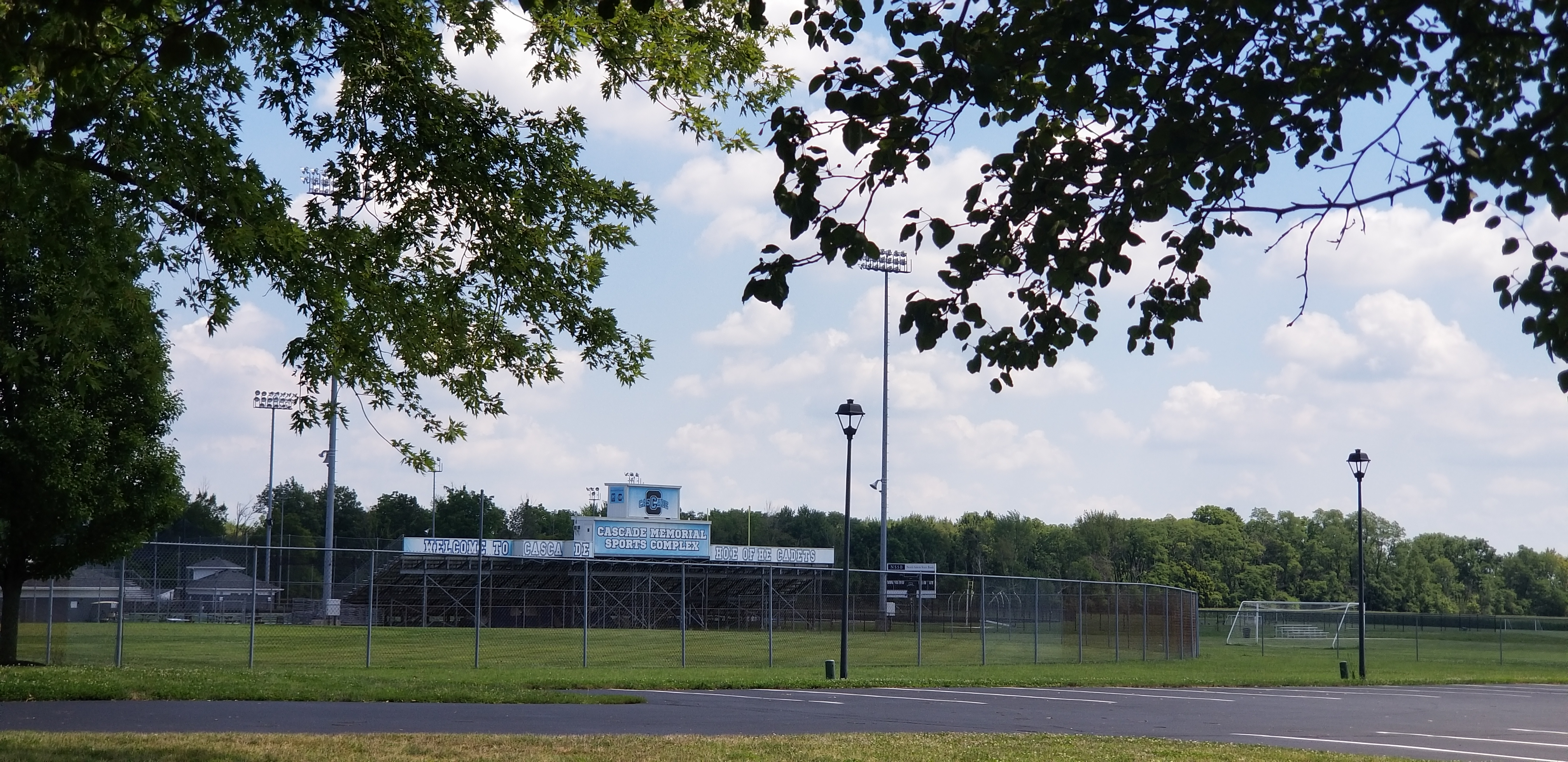
Cascade Memorial Sports Complex, the athletic field at Cascade High School.

The Cascade Cadets compete in the Indiana Crossroads Conference. School colors are Columbia blue and black. For 2019–20, the following Indiana High School Athletic Association (IHSAA) sanctioned sports were offered:

- Baseball
- Basketball
- Cross country
- Football
- Golf
- Soccer
- Softball
- Swimming and diving
- Track and field
- Volleyball
- Wrestling

In 2025, the men's football team won the 3A state championship against Bishop Luers High School with a score of 29–14 after finishing their season undefeated, which was their first football state championship in school history.

== See also ==
- List of high schools in Indiana
