= North Belleville =

North Belleville may refer to:

- North Belleville, Indiana
- North Belleville, Nova Scotia
