= Cartersburg Springs =

Cartersburg

Cartersburg Springs (or Magnetic Springs) is a site in Liberty Township, Hendricks County, Indiana, about a mile north of the town of Carterburg. The springs formerly at the site have ceased flowing.

== Geography ==
Cartersburg Springs (Magnetic Springs) is located at 39°42′32″N 86°28′23″W.
