= Wendell Holmes Stephenson =

American professor of history (1899–1970)

Wendell Holmes Stephenson (March 13, 1899 – April 14, 1970) was an American professor of history. He edited historical journals. Duke University has a collection of his papers.

== Early life and education ==
Stephenson grew up in Cartersburg, Indiana and Plainfield, Indiana. Prior to attending college, he worked as a teacher in Clayton, Indiana and as the principal of the Plainfield High School.

Stephenson received a A.B. degree in 1923 and an A.M. degree in 1924, both form Indiana University. Stephenson went on to earn a PhD from University of Michigan in 1928, with a dissertation entitled The Political Career of General James H. Lane. In 1930, Stephenson combined his master's thesis (about James H. Lane's political career in Indiana) and his PhD dissertation (about Lane's career as a Free-Stater) with content about James Lane's senatorial tenure, resulting in the monograph The Political Career of General James H. Lane, which was published by the Kansas State Historical Society.

== Career ==
From 1924 to 1926, Stephenson served as an instructor and assistant professor of history and political science at the University of Kentucky, and from 1927 to 1945, he served as an associate professor of history at Louisiana State University. From 1946 to 1953, he served as a professor of Southern history at Tulane University, and from 1953 until his death, he was a professor of history at the University of Oregon.

Stephenson edited the Journal of Southern History from 1935 until 1941 or 1940 to 1941. He was a resident of the Agricultural History Society from 1941 to 1944. He became dean of the College of Arts and Sciences at Louisiana State University and was president of the Southern Historical Association in 1944. He served as Managing editor of the Mississippi Valley Historical Review from 1953 to 1970. He was president of the Mississippi Valley Historical Association in 1970. He died in Eugene, Oregon.

== Bibliography ==
- 1930. The Political Career of General James H. Lane. Topeka, KS: Kansas State Historical Society.
- 1934. Alexander Porter: Whig Planter of Old Louisiana. Baton Rouge: Louisiana State University Press.
- 1938. Isaac Franklin, Slave Trader and Planter of the Old South: With Plantation Records. Baton Rouge: Louisiana State University Press.
- 1955. The South Lives in History: Southern Historians and their Legacy. Baton Rouge: Louisiana State University Press. (Reissued by Greenwood Press in 1969.)
- 1959. A Basic History of the Old South. Princeton, NJ: Van Nostrand.
- 1964. Southern History in the Making: Pioneer Historians of the South. Baton Rouge: Louisiana State University Press.
