= Fred C. Cole =

20th-century American historian

Cole in 1961

Fred Carrington Cole (April 12, 1912 – May 6, 1986) was an American librarian and historian. He was president of the Council on Library Resources and Washington and Lee University. In 1999, American Libraries named him one of the "100 Most Important Leaders We Had in the 20th Century".

Cole was born in Franklin, Texas. He attended Louisiana State University and earned an A.B. in 1934, an A.M. in 1936, and a Ph.D. in history in 1941. He served as editorial associate of the newly founded The Journal of Southern History under Wendell Holmes Stephenson from 1936 to 1941, and succeeded Stephenson as managing editor from 1941 to 1942. He also served as founding co-editor with Stephenson of the Southern Biography Series from Louisiana State University Press from 1938 to 1945 and was history editor of the Press from 1938 to 1942.

Cole served as a lieutenant in the United States Navy from 1942 to 1946. Initially a gunnery officer at sea, he later worked for the Office of the Surgeon General of the United States Navy, where he revised the Manual of the Medical Department (MANMED). He earned a special commendation from the Surgeon General in 1946.

Cole returned to academia at Tulane University in 1946, serving as associate professor, professor, dean, and vice president. As an administrator, Cole supported attempts to desegregate the school, though Tulane was not desegregated until after his departure, in 1963.

In 1959, Cole became the 20th president of Washington and Lee University. During his tenure at WLU, Cole was credited with raising educational standards and integrating libraries into the curriculum. He oversaw the university's first self-study and the integration of the school, with the first African-American student enrolling in 1966.

From 1954 to 1955, Cole took a leave of absence from Tulane to work for the Ford Foundation as their program officer for education. Through Cole, Louis B. Wright was able to secure initial funding for the Council on Library Resources, an organization dedicated to addressing the common problems faced by libraries. Cole joined the board of the CLR in 1962 and left WLU in 1967 to succeed Verner Clapp as president of the CLR, a post he held until 1977.

In 1976, he received a Special Centennial Citation from the American Library Association for "making Ford Foundation dollars for libraries achieve maximum impact." In 1978 he was awarded American Library Association Honorary Membership.

Following his retirement from the CLR, he moved to Chapel Hill, North Carolina, where he died from congestive heart failure in 1986, at the age of 74.
