= Clifton Wheeler =

American painter

- Born: 1883; Hadley, Indiana
- Died: 1953 (aged 69–70)
- Occupation: Painter

Clifton Wheeler (1883–1953) was an American Impressionist artist from Hadley, Indiana. Wheeler was known for having been a participant in the City Hospital mural project, and having been a member of the Hoosier Group and the Irvington Group. Wheeler was a private pupil of William Forsyth, and was also known for having contributed to Indianapolis’ public art scene multiple times throughout his career as an artist.

== Early life ==
Wheeler was born in Hadley, Indiana, but moved to Mooresville, Indiana at a young age. As a boy, Wheeler was a private pupil of William Forsyth, and they frequently went on sketching trips to the countryside together.

== Career ==
Wheeler began his art career when he began taking private lessons with William Forsyth. Forsyth was known to have taken the young Wheeler on sketching trips in the countryside of Indiana. Wheeler began studying at the New York School of Art in 1902, and studied with a few other successful American artists including William Merritt Chase, Robert Henri, and Kenneth Hayes Miller. He also spent time studying with Edward Hopper and Rockwell Kent.

Wheeler traveled to Europe twice to improve himself as an artist by studying abroad. In 1907, he went on his first trip to study the Old Masters. He went again to study the Old Masters in 1910, meeting his future wife on the second trip. In between Wheeler's two trips abroad, he was employed as a teacher and painter at the Herron School of Art and Design. Wheeler taught at Herron for many years until his retirement in 1933.

Wheeler's early work shows strong resemblance to Forsyth's impressionistic approach, but his later work becomes more bold and blocky. Both styles of Wheeler's work have been found in the collection of City Hospital paintings and murals. While working on the Indianapolis City Hospital project, Wheeler helped create a significant amount of art for the men's medical ward and the pediatric ward. A fragment of a larger impressionistic mural by Wheeler, nicknamed "Women and Children", can be found on display in the Sidney and Lois Eskenazi Hospital, part of the Eskenazi Health network.

Wheeler also painted several Mother Goose themed murals in the pediatric ward like his contemporaries in the mural project, Otto Stark and Carl Graf. These murals were lost from environmental damages, improper cleanings and restorations or subsequent renovations in the 1960s.

Four watercolor sketches, "Mary, Mary Quite Contrary", "Simple Simon Pussy Cat", "Pussy Cat" and "Hark! Hark! The Dogs do Bark" by Wheeler are in the collection of Eskenazi Health. The original murals were commissioned by A. L. Block for the L. Strauss and Company Store located downtown in Indianapolis, Indiana. Ten nursery rhyme murals by Wheeler and Otto Stark were donated to Eskenazi Health by the St. Margaret's Hospital Guild in 1937 and hung in the children's ward and occupational therapy. Since then several of the murals have ended up on display at IPS Brookside Elementary School #54.

Wheeler also contributed to Indianapolis’ Public Art Collection after completing the City Hospital project. He also painted the mural over the Circle Theater on Monument Circle in Indianapolis. Wheeler began teaching art courses at Shortridge High School and continued painting and sketching until his death in 1953.

== Awards ==
- Halcomb Prize, 1921
- Foulke Prize, 1917
