= McCormack-Bowman House =

Historic house in Indiana, United States

- U.S. National Register of Historic Places
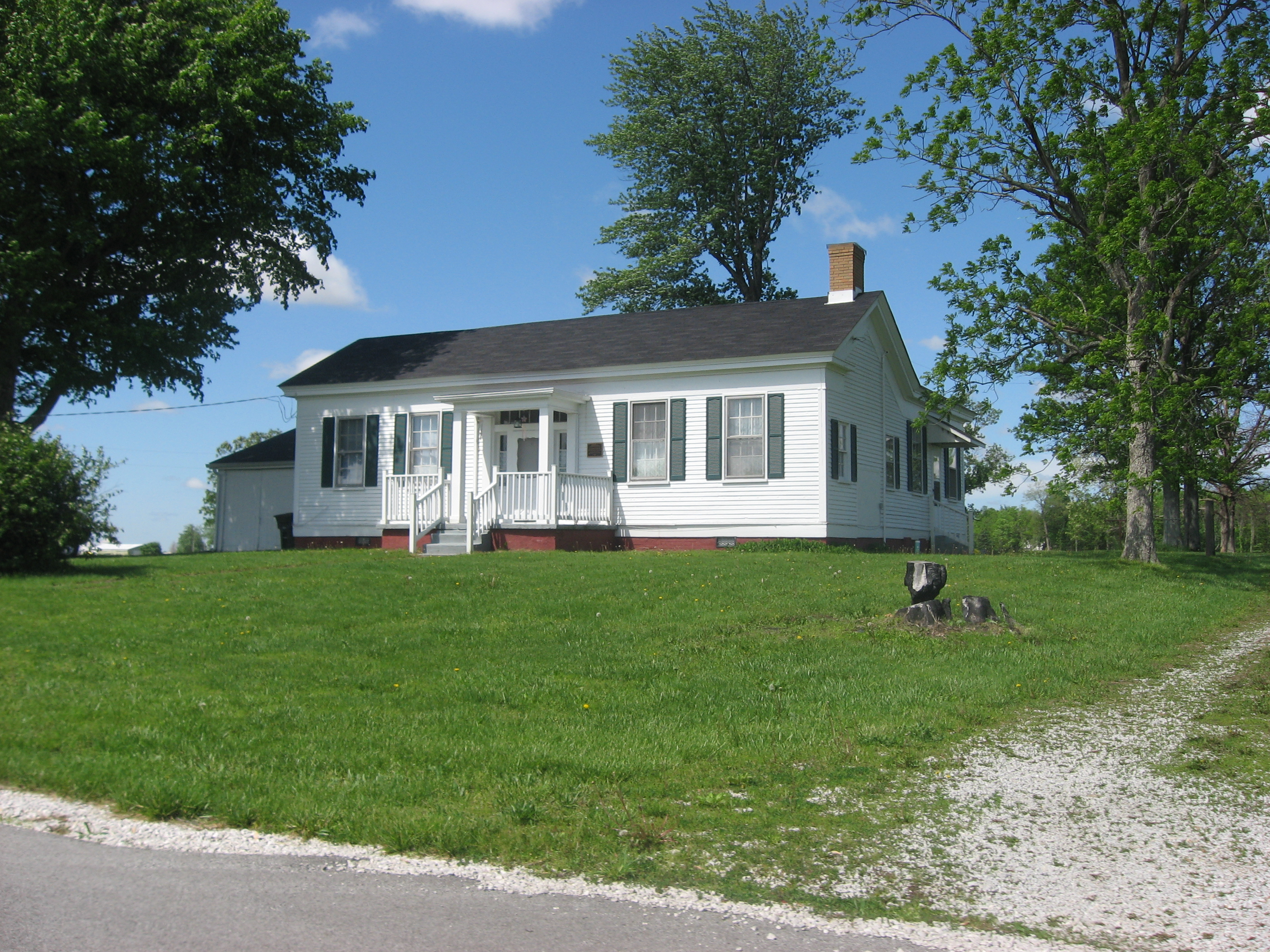
- McCormack-Bowman House, May 2011

- Location within Indiana Location within the United States
- Location: Co. Rd. 200 W, 0.5 mi. S of jct. with US 40, southwest of Clayton in Franklin Township, Hendricks County, Indiana
- Coordinates: 39°38′50″N 86°33′37″W
- Area: less than one acre
- Built: c. 1846
- Architectural style: Greek Revival, Central Passage
- NRHP reference No.: 95000200
- Added to NRHP: March 20, 1995

McCormack-Bowman House is a historic home located in Franklin Township, Hendricks County, Indiana. It was built about 1846, and is a one-story, central passage plan, frame dwelling with Greek Revival style design elements. It has a gable roof, sits on a brick foundation, and features a one-bay centrally placed entrance portico added in the 1930s.

It was added to the National Register of Historic Places in 1995.
