= Arthur Trester =

American basketball administrator

- Born: June 10, 1878; Pecksburg, Indiana, U.S.
- Died: September 18, 1944 (aged 66)
- Education: Earlham College and Columbia University

Arthur Leslie Trester (June 10, 1878 in Pecksburg, Indiana – September 18, 1944) was an American basketball administrator. Trester was the commissioner of the Indiana High School Athletic Association (IHSAA) from 1922 to 1944, that organization was the force behind Hoosier Hysteria in Indiana. During his tenure as commissioner of the IHSAA he excluded black and parochial schools from the IHSAA arguing that they were not public high schools. He was enshrined in the Basketball Hall of Fame as a contributor in 1961.

Trester graduated from Earlham College and obtained a master's degree from Columbia University.

From the Naismith Memorial Basketball Hall of Fame:

Leading basketball administrator and native of Pecksburg, Indiana, Arthur Trester was the driving force behind the Indiana High School Athletic Association. Under Trester's direction, the IHSAA became a model organization and the force behind “Hoosier Hysteria” in Indiana. The Indiana High School Athletic Association was in fact one of the finest scholastic organizations in the country during the time of Trester. Served as Commissioner of the Indiana High School Athletic Association from 1929 to 1944 and as its permanent secretary from 1913 to 1929. A strict disciplinarian, coach and referee, Trester also had strong personal integrity, a personal commitment to the game of basketball, and demonstrated an efficiency not often seen in governing organizations. Prior to joining the Indiana High School Athletic Association, Trester served as the superintendent for three Indiana city school systems. Called the “Czar” of Indiana high school athletics, Trester's engaging personality helped high school basketball flourish on a national level.
