= New Winchester, Indiana =

- Unincorporated community
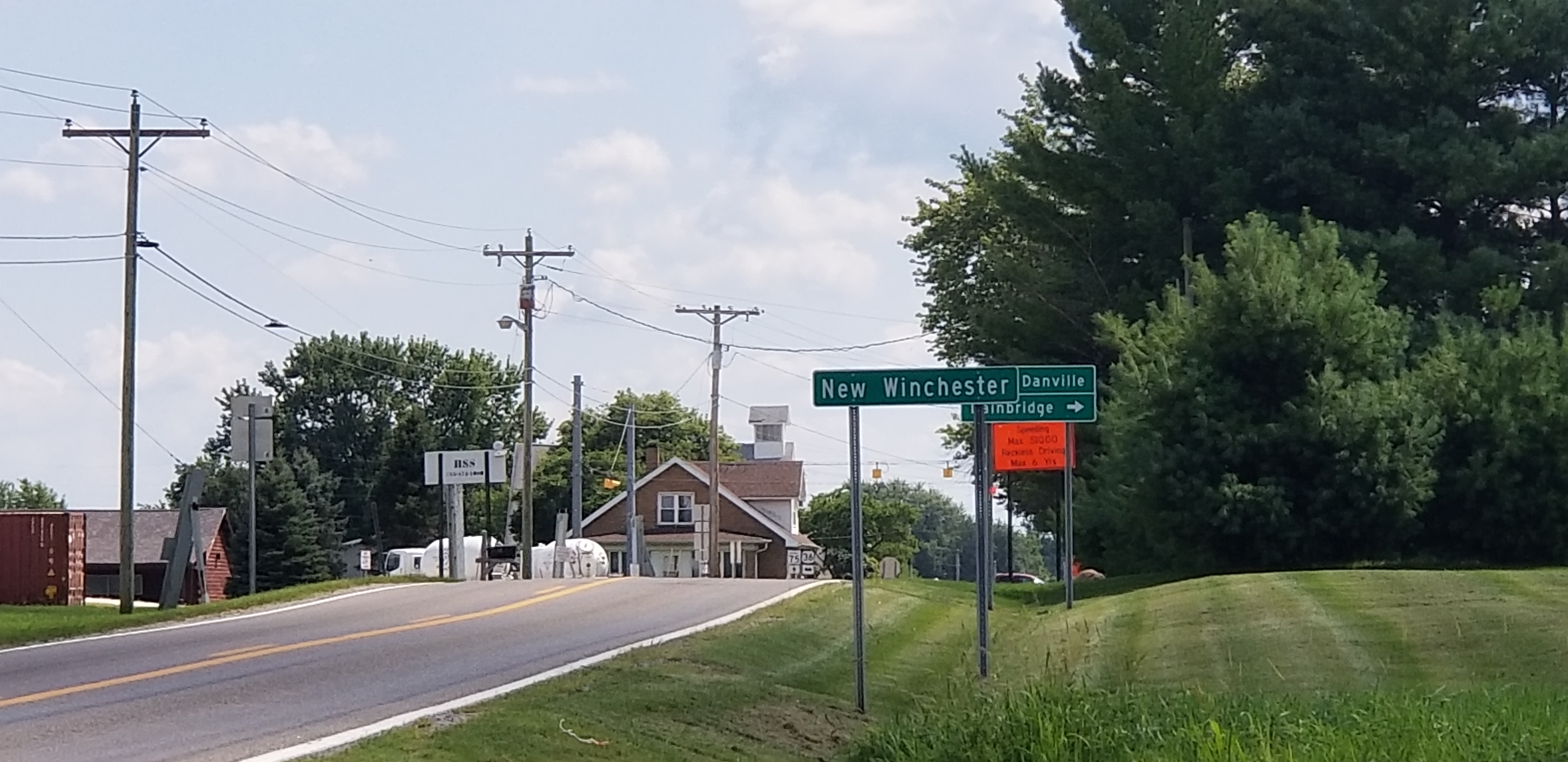

- Location within Indiana Location within the United States
- Coordinates: 39°45′38″N 86°39′03″W
- Country: United States
- State: Indiana
- County: Hendricks
- Township: Marion
- Elevation: 948 ft (289 m)
- ZIP code: 46122
- FIPS code: 18-53892
- GNIS feature ID: 440127

New Winchester is an unincorporated community in Marion Township, Hendricks County, Indiana.

== History ==
New Winchester was laid out in 1832. A post office was established at New Winchester in 1837, and remained in operation until it was discontinued in 1904.

The local high school operated from 1914 to 1963, before being consolidated into Danville High School for the 1963–64 school year.

== Geography ==
New Winchester is located at 39°45′38″N 86°39′03″W.
