= Reno, Indiana =

- Unincorporated community
- Location within Indiana Location within the United States
- Coordinates: 39°42′37″N 86°40′13″W
- Country: United States
- State: Indiana
- County: Hendricks
- Township: Clay
- Elevation: 909 ft (277 m)
- ZIP code: 46121
- FIPS code: 18-63774
- GNIS feature ID: 441898

Reno is an unincorporated community in Clay Township, Hendricks County, Indiana.

== History ==
Reno was platted in 1870 when the railroad was extended to that point. It was likely named for Jesse L. Reno, an officer who served in the Mexican–American War. A post office was established at Reno in 1870, and remained in operation until it was discontinued in 1912.

== Geography ==
Reno is located at 39°42′37″N 86°40′13″W.
