= Raintown, Indiana =

Unincorporated community in Indiana, U.S.

Coordinates: 39°52′42″N 86°30′36″W

Raintown is an unincorporated community in Hendricks County, Indiana, in the United States.

== History ==
A post office was established at Raintown in 1872, and remained in operation until it was discontinued in 1914. The community was named after Hiram Rain, the owner of a mill.
