= Springtown, Indiana =

- Unincorporated community
- Location within Indiana Location within the United States
- Coordinates: 39°42′08″N 86°36′22″W
- Country: United States
- State: Indiana
- County: Hendricks
- Township: Clay
- Elevation: 843 ft (257 m)
- ZIP code: 46122
- FIPS code: 18-72350
- GNIS feature ID: 444017

Springtown is an unincorporated community in Clay Township, Hendricks County, Indiana.

A post office was established at Springtown in 1843, and remained in operation until it was discontinued in 1865.

== Geography ==
Springtown is located at 39°42′08″N 86°36′22″W.
