= Pecksburg, Indiana =

Unincorporated community in Indiana, U.S.

Coordinates: 39°41′17″N 86°34′27″W

Pecksburg is an unincorporated community in Clay Township, Hendricks County, Indiana.

== History ==
Pecksburg was platted in 1853. It was named for a railroad official. Pecksburg contained a post office from 1852 until 1913.

== Notable person ==
Arthur Trester, a basketball official, was born in Pecksburg.
