= Marion Township, Hendricks County, Indiana =

Marion Township
- Township
- Location in Hendricks County
- Coordinates: 39°46′06″N 86°38′14″W
- Country: United States
- State: Indiana
- County: Hendricks

Government
  - Type: Indiana township

Area
  - Total: 38.62 sq mi (100.03 km^{2})
  - Land: 38.62 sq mi (100.03 km^{2})
  - Water: 0 sq mi (0 km^{2}) 0%
- Elevation: 968 ft (295 m)

Population (2020)
  - Total: 1,510
  - Density: 36/sq mi (14/km^{2})
- GNIS feature ID: 0453606

Marion Township is one of twelve townships in Hendricks County, Indiana, United States. As of the 2010 census, its population was 1,402.

== Geography ==
Marion Township covers an area of 38.62 square miles (100.0 km^{2}), all land.

=== Unincorporated towns ===
- Hadley
- New Winchester

(This list is based on USGS data and may include former settlements.)

=== Adjacent townships ===
- Eel River Township (north)
- Center Township (east)
- Clay Township (south)
- Floyd Township, Putnam County (west)
- Jackson Township, Putnam County (northwest)

=== Cemeteries ===
The township contains fifteen cemeteries: Abner-Ragan, Dickerson, Higgins, New Winchester Baptist, New Winchester, Noland Number 1, Peck, Robbins, Ryner, Sears, Shannon, Tinder, Turner, Turner Farm and Vannice.

=== Major highways ===
- U.S. Route 36
- Indiana State Road 75
- Indiana State Road 236

=== Airports and Landing strips ===
- Layne Field 5II1
