= Amo station =

- Amo THI & E Interurban Depot/Substation
- U.S. National Register of Historic Places
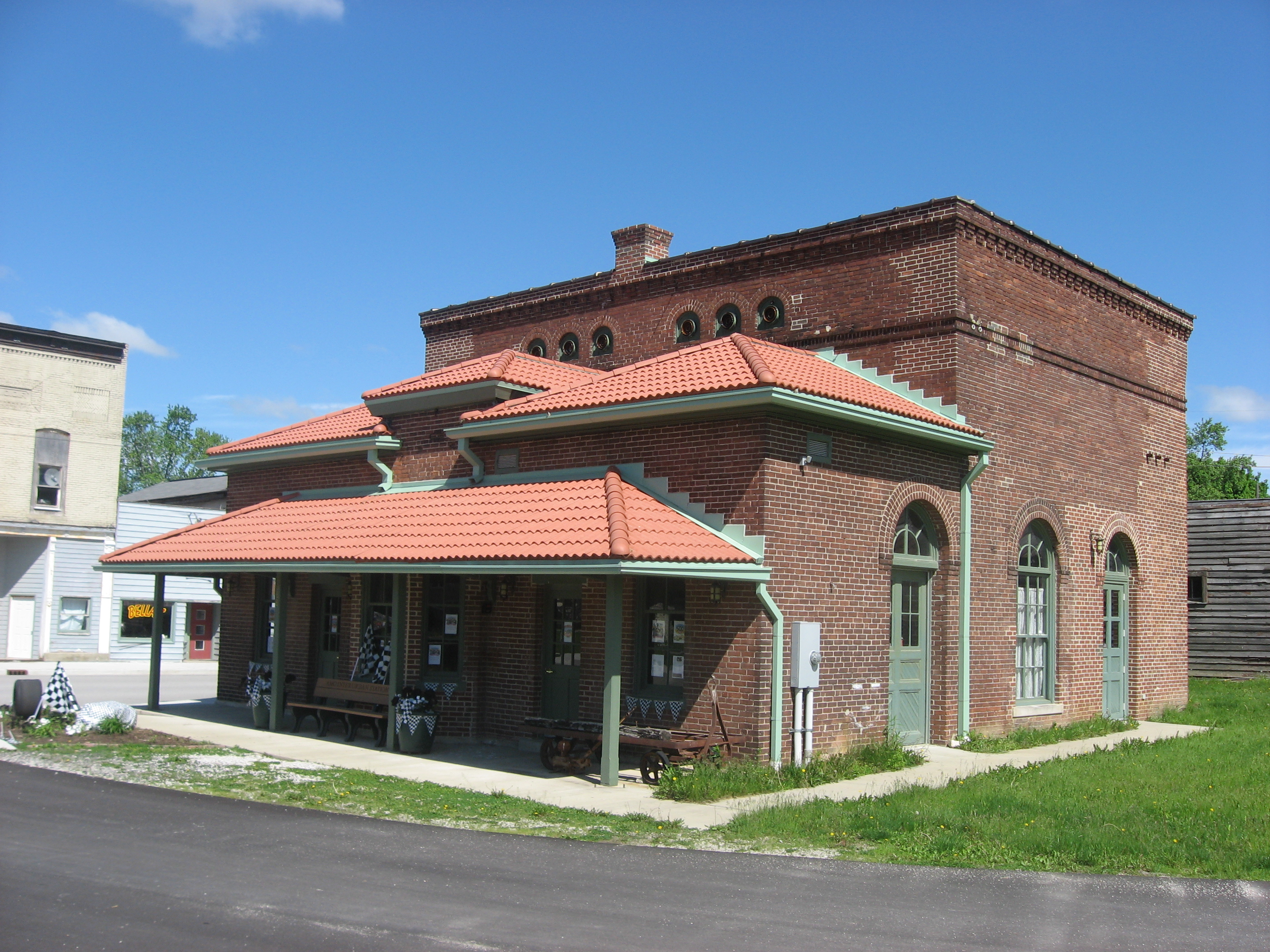
- Amo THI & E Interurban Depot-Substation, May 2011

- Location within Indiana Location within the United States
- Location: 4985 Railroad St., Amo, Indiana
- Coordinates: 39°41′18″N 86°36′48″W
- Area: less than one acre
- Built: 1907
- Architectural style: Romanesque, Queen Anne
- NRHP reference No.: 06001294
- Added to NRHP: January 25, 2007

Amo THI & E Interurban Depot/Substation, also known as Amo Interurban Depot, is a historic interurban train station located at Amo, Indiana.

== Design ==
The building consists of a small brick passenger/cargo depot with a large, two-story repair substation at the rear. It has Romanesque Revival and Queen Anne style design elements. The passenger depot section is topped by a series of red clay tile hipped roofs.

The building is of the same design as the company's Plainfield Depot.

== History ==
It was built in 1907 by the Terre Haute, Indianapolis and Eastern Traction Company. Interurban transportation for Amo ceased on January 10, 1940.

The building was renovated in the 2000s for use as a library and community center. It was added to the National Register of Historic Places in 2007.

Preceding station	Terre Haute, Indianapolis and Eastern Traction Company	Following station
Coatesville toward Terre Haute	Terre Haute–Indianapolis Line	Clayton toward Indianapolis

== See also ==
- THI and E Interurban Depot-Substation
