= Stilesville, Indiana =

- Town
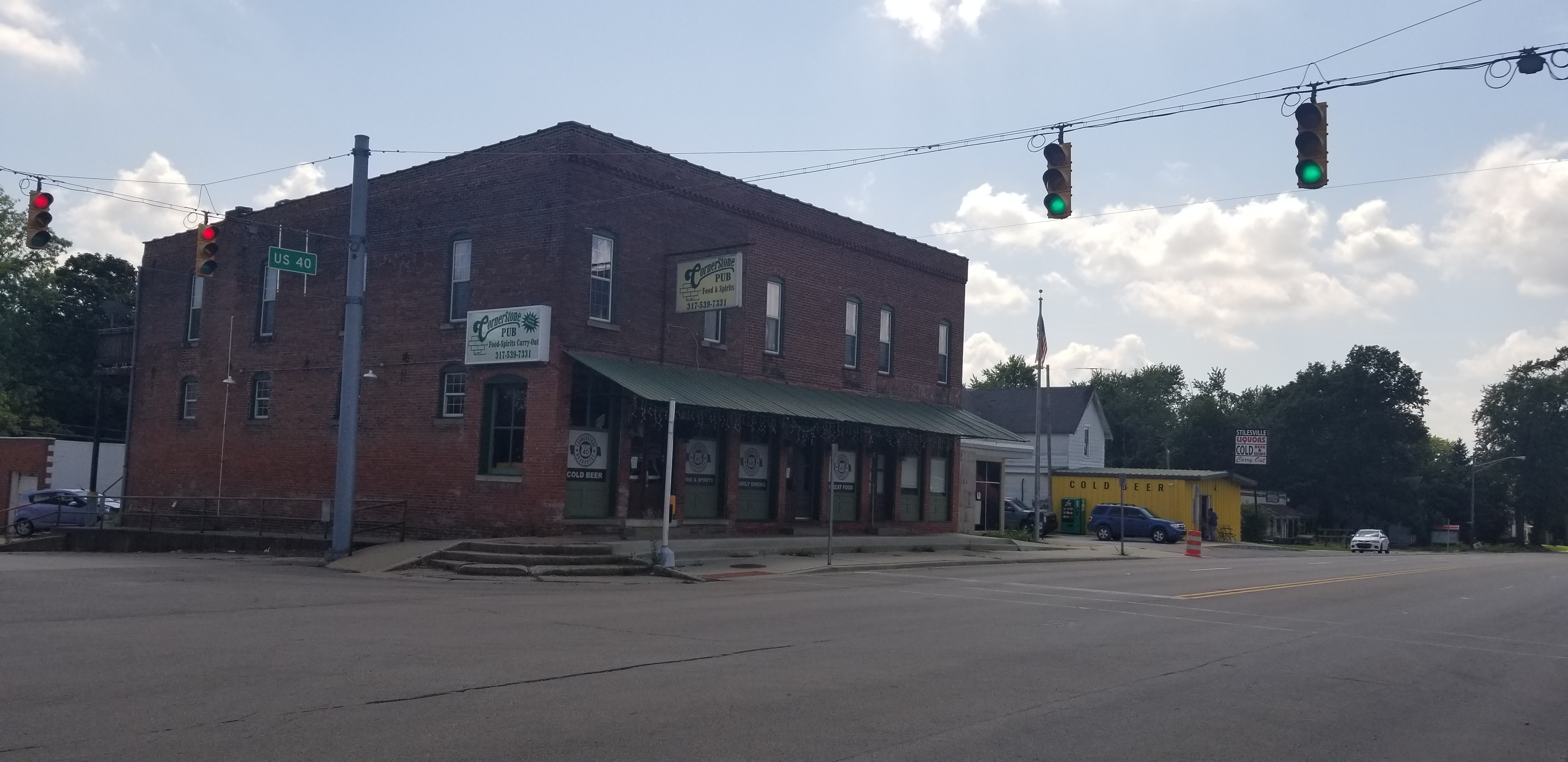
- U.S. Route 40 in Stilesville, Indiana

- Logo

- Location of Stilesville in Hendricks County, Indiana.
- Coordinates: 39°38′13″N 86°38′04″W
- Country: United States
- State: Indiana
- County: Hendricks
- Township: Franklin

Area
  - Total: 0.38 sq mi (0.98 km^{2})
  - Land: 0.37 sq mi (0.97 km^{2})
  - Water: 0.0077 sq mi (0.02 km^{2})
- Elevation: 794 ft (242 m)

Population (2020)
  - Total: 269
  - Density: 721.4/sq mi (278.54/km^{2})
- Time zone: UTC-5 (Eastern (EST))
  - Summer (DST): UTC-4 (EDT)
- ZIP code: 46180
- Area code: 317
- FIPS code: 18-73178
- GNIS feature ID: 2397682
- Website: www.in.gov/towns/stilesville/

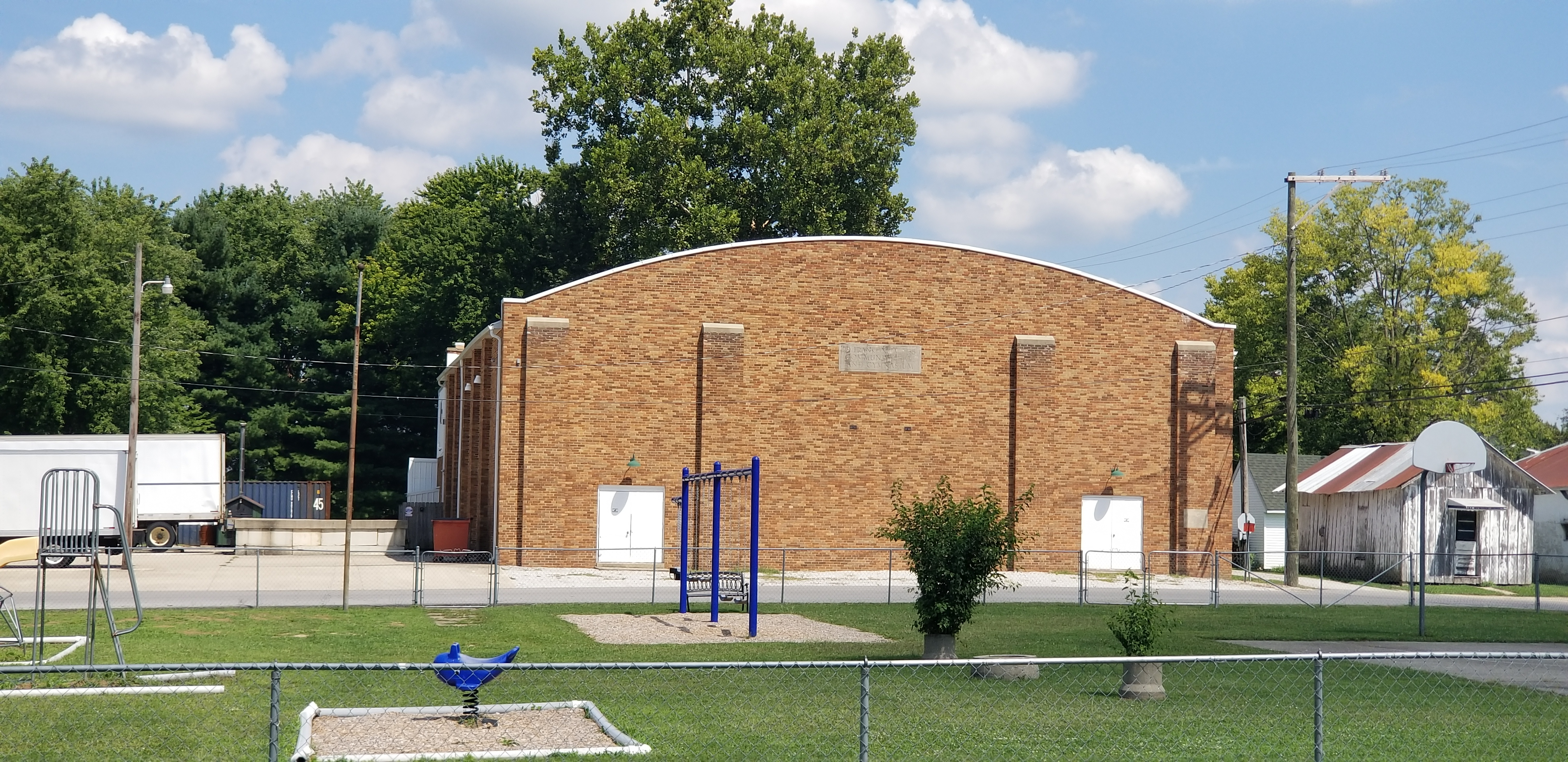
The former gymnasium for Stilesville Grade and High School, now used as a warehouse.

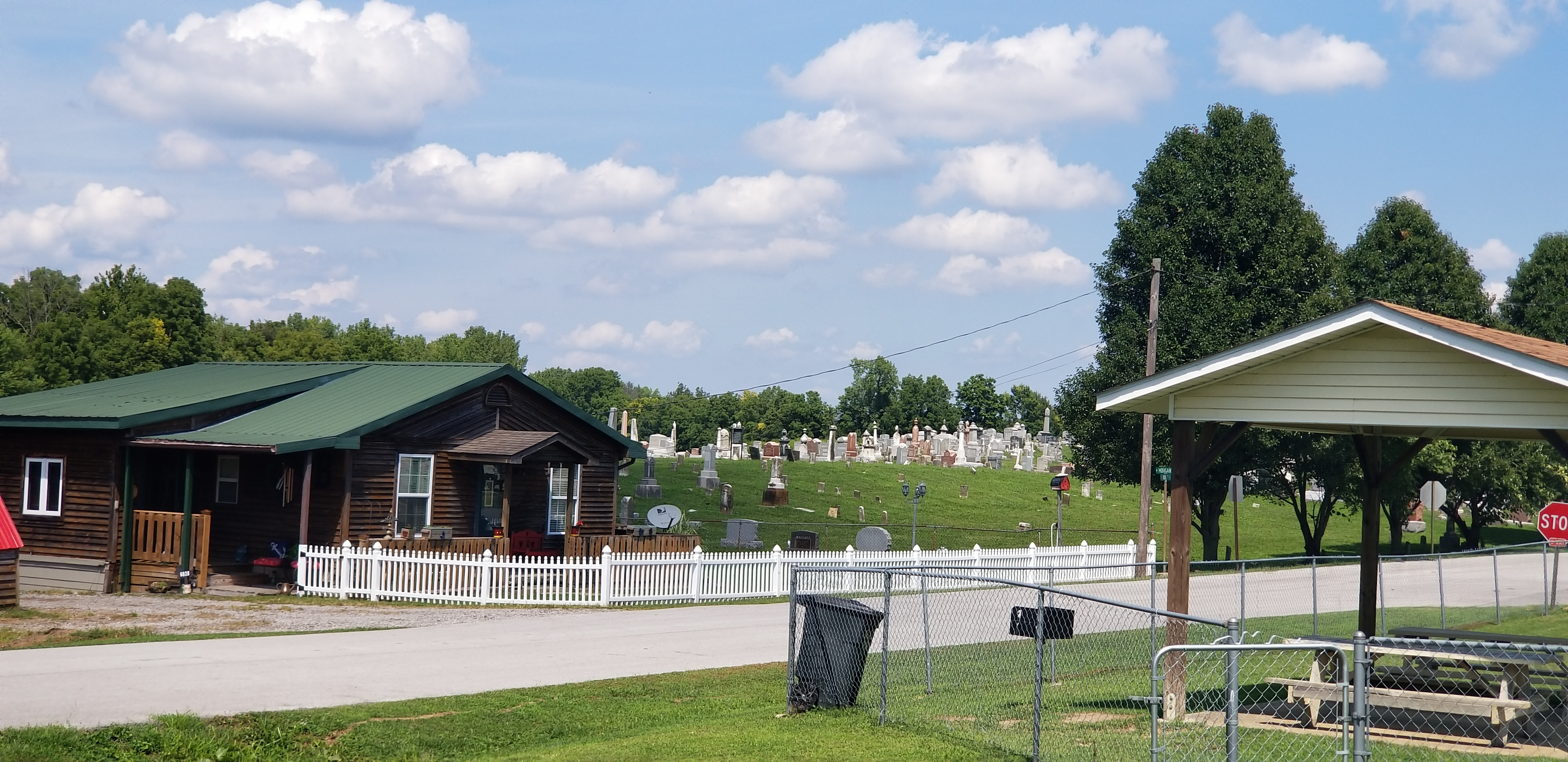
Cemetery in Stilesville, Indiana

Stilesville is a town in Franklin Township, Hendricks County, Indiana, United States. As of the 2020 census, Stilesville had a population of 269.

== History ==
Stilesville was laid out in 1828. It was named for Jeremiah Stiles, a pioneer settler. The National Road was built through Stilesville in 1830. The town of Stiles, Wisconsin is named after the town.

== Geography ==
According to the 2010 census, Stilesville has a total area of 0.376 square miles (0.97 km^{2}), of which 0.37 square miles (0.96 km^{2}) (or 98.4%) is land and 0.006 square miles (0.02 km^{2}) (or 1.6%) is water. U.S. Route 40 passes through Stilesville on its 2,285-mile (3,677 km) journey from Atlantic City, New Jersey to Silver Summit, Utah.

== Demographics ==
Historical population
Census	Pop.	Note	%±
1870	205		—
1880	295		43.9%
1930	318		—
1940	273		−14.2%
1950	330		20.9%
1960	361		9.4%
1970	352		−2.5%
1980	350		−0.6%
1990	298		−14.9%
2000	261		−12.4%
2010	316		21.1%
2020	269		−14.9%
U.S. Decennial Census

=== 2010 census ===
At the 2010 census there were 316 people, 124 households, and 89 families living in the town. The population density was 854.1 inhabitants per square mile (329.8/km^{2}). There were 139 housing units at an average density of 375.7 per square mile (145.1/km^{2}). The racial makeup of the town was 98.7% White, 0.3% African American, and 0.9% from other races. Hispanic or Latino of any race were 2.8%.

Of the 124 households 35.5% had children under the age of 18 living with them, 50.8% were married couples living together, 12.1% had a female householder with no husband present, 8.9% had a male householder with no wife present, and 28.2% were non-families. 23.4% of households were one person and 4.8% were one person aged 65 or older. The average household size was 2.55 and the average family size was 3.01.

The median age in the town was 41.9 years. 25.3% of residents were under the age of 18; 8.8% were between the ages of 18 and 24; 21.8% were from 25 to 44; 30.3% were from 45 to 64; and 13.6% were 65 or older. The gender makeup of the town was 49.1% male and 50.9% female.

=== 2000 census ===
At the 2000 census there were 261 people, 109 households, and 82 families living in the town. The population density was 925.7 inhabitants per square mile (357.4/km^{2}). There were 121 housing units at an average density of 429.1 per square mile (165.7/km^{2}). The racial makeup of the town was 98.85% White and 1.15% Native American. Hispanic or Latino of any race were 0.77%.

Of the 109 households 30.3% had children under the age of 18 living with them, 60.6% were married couples living together, 13.8% had a female householder with no husband present, and 23.9% were non-families. 21.1% of households were one person and 7.3% were one person aged 65 or older. The average household size was 2.39 and the average family size was 2.80.

The age distribution was 23.0% under the age of 18, 8.0% from 18 to 24, 29.9% from 25 to 44, 23.0% from 45 to 64, and 16.1% 65 or older. The median age was 40 years. For every 100 females, there were 96.2 males. For every 100 females age 18 and over, there were 95.1 males.

The median household income was $37,857 and the median family income was $48,750. Males had a median income of $34,500 versus $21,563 for females. The per capita income for the town was $20,494. None of the population or families were below the poverty line.

== Education ==
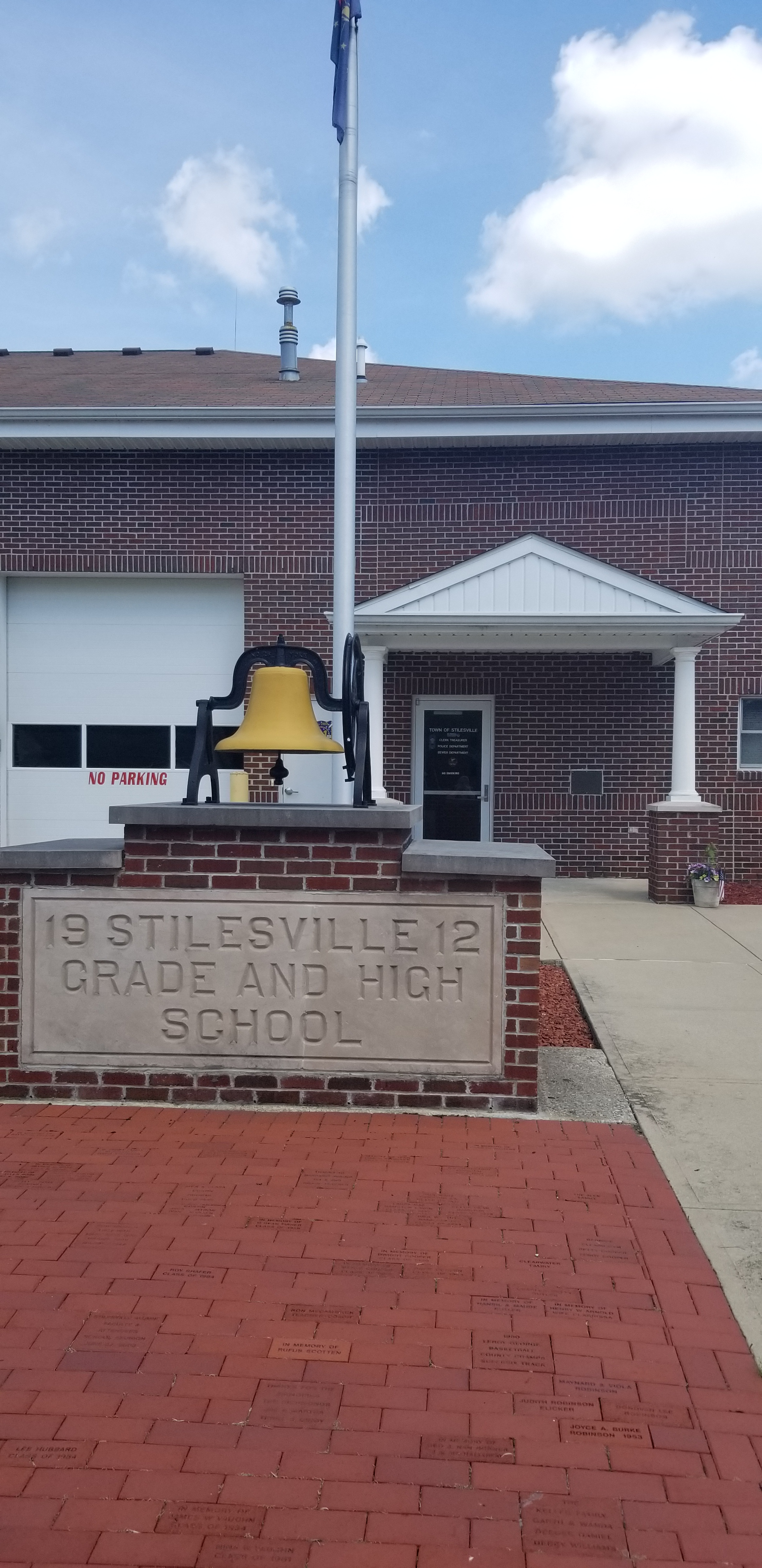
The town hall in Stilesville, Indiana, with a memorial for the old school.

Stilesville is in the Mill Creek Community School Corporation. The district's comprehensive high school is Cascade High School.
