= Amo, Indiana =

- Town
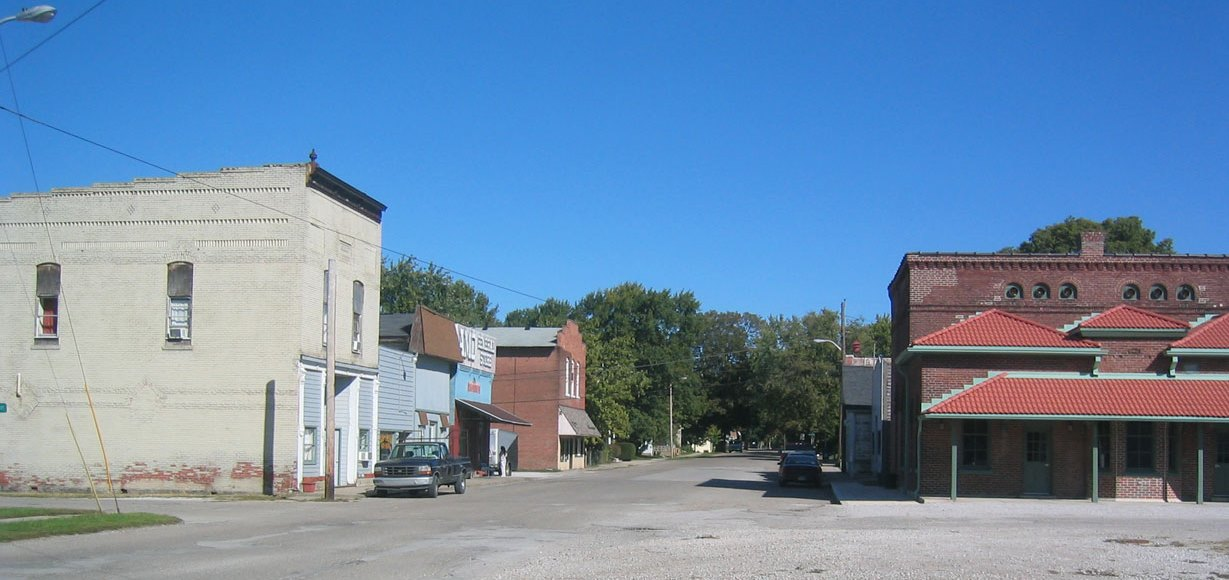
- Downtown Amo

- Seal

- Location of Amo in Hendricks County, Indiana.
- Coordinates: 39°41′20″N 86°36′46″W
- Country: United States
- State: Indiana
- County: Hendricks
- Township: Clay
- Founded: 1850
- Incorporated: 1913
- Founder: Joseph Morris

Area
  - Total: 0.61 sq mi (1.58 km^{2})
  - Land: 0.61 sq mi (1.58 km^{2})
  - Water: 0 sq mi (0.00 km^{2})
- Elevation: 830 ft (250 m)

Population (2020)
  - Total: 408
  - Density: 666.8/sq mi (257.45/km^{2})
- Time zone: UTC−5 (EST)
  - Summer (DST): UTC−4 (EST)
- ZIP code: 46103
- Area code: 317
- FIPS code: 18-01450
- GNIS ID: 2397430
- Website: amoin.net

Amo (/ˈeɪmoʊ/ EY-mo) is a town in Clay Township, Hendricks County, Indiana, United States. The population was 408 at the 2020 census.

== History ==
The town was laid out as Morristown in 1850 by Joseph Morris. The present name of Amo (meaning "I love" in Latin) was adopted in 1855. Amo was incorporated as a town in 1913.

The Amo THI & E Interurban Depot/Substation was added to the National Register of Historic Places in 2007.

=== Town seal ===
In 2000, the town celebrated its sesquicentennial anniversary in combination with the Hoosier Millennium celebration. The town council authorized a contest to design and adopt the official "Town Seal" open to all residents and any student enrolled in a public institution within the town boundaries of Amo. Officials from the Hoosier Millennium committee at the 500 Festival Parade in downtown Indianapolis reviewed the forty-two submissions on May 27, 2000, and selected that of town resident Randy L. Potts.

On June 3, 2000, U.S. Congressman and Gubernatorial candidate David M. McIntosh presented the finalized seal to the Amo Town Board during the Amo Annual Fish Fry.

The seal pictures the ol' Mill building with Mill Creek running to the left of the structure. A railroad track lies running to the skyline of Indianapolis next to a corn field. The seal is finalized with a freshly plowed field depicting the agricultural influence of the community. The outer ring of the seal states, "Town of Amo" and the year "1850" representing the town's founding.

== Geography ==
According to the 2010 census, Amo has a total area of 0.63 square miles (1.63 km^{2}), all land.

=== Vandalia Trail ===
The Vandalia Trail is a multipurpose rail trail used for recreational activities such as hiking, off-road bicycling, and horseback riding. It is currently, as of 2011, under development. The trail is planned to be connected to, and become part of, the National Road Heritage Trail, extending approximately 150 miles from Terre Haute to Richmond using the former Pennsylvania and Vandalia rail corridors, wherever possible, and closely follow the Historic National Road for much of its route. The three-mile (4.8 km) section connecting Amo to Coatesville is maintained by the Hendricks County Parks and Recreation and the Hendricks County Trail Association.

== Demographics ==
Historical population
Census	Pop.	Note	%±
1880	200		—
1920	274		—
1930	278		1.5%
1940	288		3.6%
1950	354		22.9%
1960	437		23.4%
1970	422		−3.4%
1980	444		5.2%
1990	380		−14.4%
2000	414		8.9%
2010	401		−3.1%
2020	408		1.7%
U.S. Decennial Census

=== 2010 census ===
As of the 2010 census, there were 401 people, 141 households, and 110 families living in the town. The population density was 636.5 inhabitants per square mile (245.8/km^{2}). There were 150 housing units at an average density of 238.1 per square mile (91.9/km^{2}). The racial makeup of the town was 98.8% White, 1.0% Native American, and 0.2% from two or more races. Hispanic or Latino of any race were 0.2% of the population.

There were 141 households, of which 44.0% had children under the age of 18 living with them, 58.2% were married couples living together, 13.5% had a female householder with no husband present, 6.4% had a male householder with no wife present, and 22.0% were non-families. 18.4% of all households were made up of individuals, and 10.7% had someone living alone who was 65 years of age or older. The average household size was 2.84 and the average family size was 3.23.

The median age in the town was 38.3 years. 29.2% of residents were under the age of 18; 6.2% were between the ages of 18 and 24; 23.9% were from 25 to 44; 24.7% were from 45 to 64; and 16% were 65 years of age or older. The gender makeup of the town was 49.9% male and 50.1% female.

=== 2000 census ===
As of the 2000 census, there were 414 people, 147 households, and 113 families living in the town. The population density was 679.1 inhabitants per square mile (262.2/km^{2}). There were 154 housing units at an average density of 252.6 per square mile (97.5/km^{2}). The racial makeup of the town was 99.52% White, 0.24% African American and 0.24% Native American.

There were 147 households, out of which 43.5% had children under the age of 18 living with them, 61.9% were married couples living together, 12.9% had a female householder with no husband present, and 23.1% were non-families. 16.3% of all households were made up of individuals, and 9.5% had someone living alone who was 65 years of age or older. The average household size was 2.82 and the average family size was 3.20.

In the town, the population was spread out, with 31.6% under the age of 18, 6.5% from 18 to 24, 34.3% from 25 to 44, 15.5% from 45 to 64, and 12.1% who were 65 years of age or older. The median age was 32 years. For every 100 females, there were 94.4 males. For every 100 females age 18 and over, there were 88.7 males.

The median income for a household in the town was $41,167, and the median income for a family was $41,083. Males had a median income of $35,313 versus $23,438 for females. The per capita income for the town was $15,994. About 4.9% of families and 6.7% of the population were below the poverty line, including 3.3% of those under age 18 and 5.9% of those age 65 or over.

== Education ==
It is in the Mill Creek Community School Corporation.

Mill Creek West Elementary is located in Amo. It is one of two elementary schools within the Mill Creek Community School Corporation.

The district's comprehensive high school is Cascade High School.

== Notable people ==
- Chase A. Clark, United States federal judge from Idaho and the 18th governor of Idaho.
