= Clay Township, Hendricks County, Indiana =

Clay Township
- Township
- Location in Hendricks County
- Coordinates: 39°41′49″N 86°37′03″W
- Country: United States
- State: Indiana
- County: Hendricks

Government
  - Type: Indiana township

Area
  - Total: 26.51 sq mi (68.66 km^{2})
  - Land: 26.51 sq mi (68.65 km^{2})
  - Water: 0.0039 sq mi (0.01 km^{2}) 0.01%
- Elevation: 863 ft (263 m)

Population (2020)
  - Total: 2,341
  - Density: 85/sq mi (32.9/km^{2})
- GNIS feature ID: 0453210

Clay Township is one of twelve townships in Hendricks County, Indiana, United States. As of the 2010 census, its population was 2,256.

== History ==
Clay Township was organized in 1845.

== Geography ==
Clay Township covers an area of 26.51 square miles (68.7 km^{2}); of this, 0.01 square miles (0.026 km^{2}) or 0.01 percent is water.

=== Cities and towns ===
- Amo
- Coatesville

=== Unincorporated towns ===
- Pecksburg
- Reno
- Springtown

(This list is based on USGS data and may include former settlements.)

=== Adjacent townships ===
- Marion Township (north)
- Center Township (northeast)
- Liberty Township (east)
- Franklin Township (south)
- Floyd Township, Putnam County (west)
- Marion Township, Putnam County (west)

=== Cemeteries ===
The township contains eight cemeteries: Amo, Bethel Lutheran, Coatesville, Hadley Friends, Moravian, Old Spring, Springtown Methodist and West Branch Friends.

=== Major highways ===
- Indiana State Road 75

=== Airports and landing strips ===
- Marcidale Airport 8IN9

== Education ==
Clay Township residents may obtain a free library card from the Coatesville-Clay Township Public Library in Coatesville.
