= Plainfield station (Indiana) =

- THI and E Interurban Depot-Substation
- U.S. National Register of Historic Places
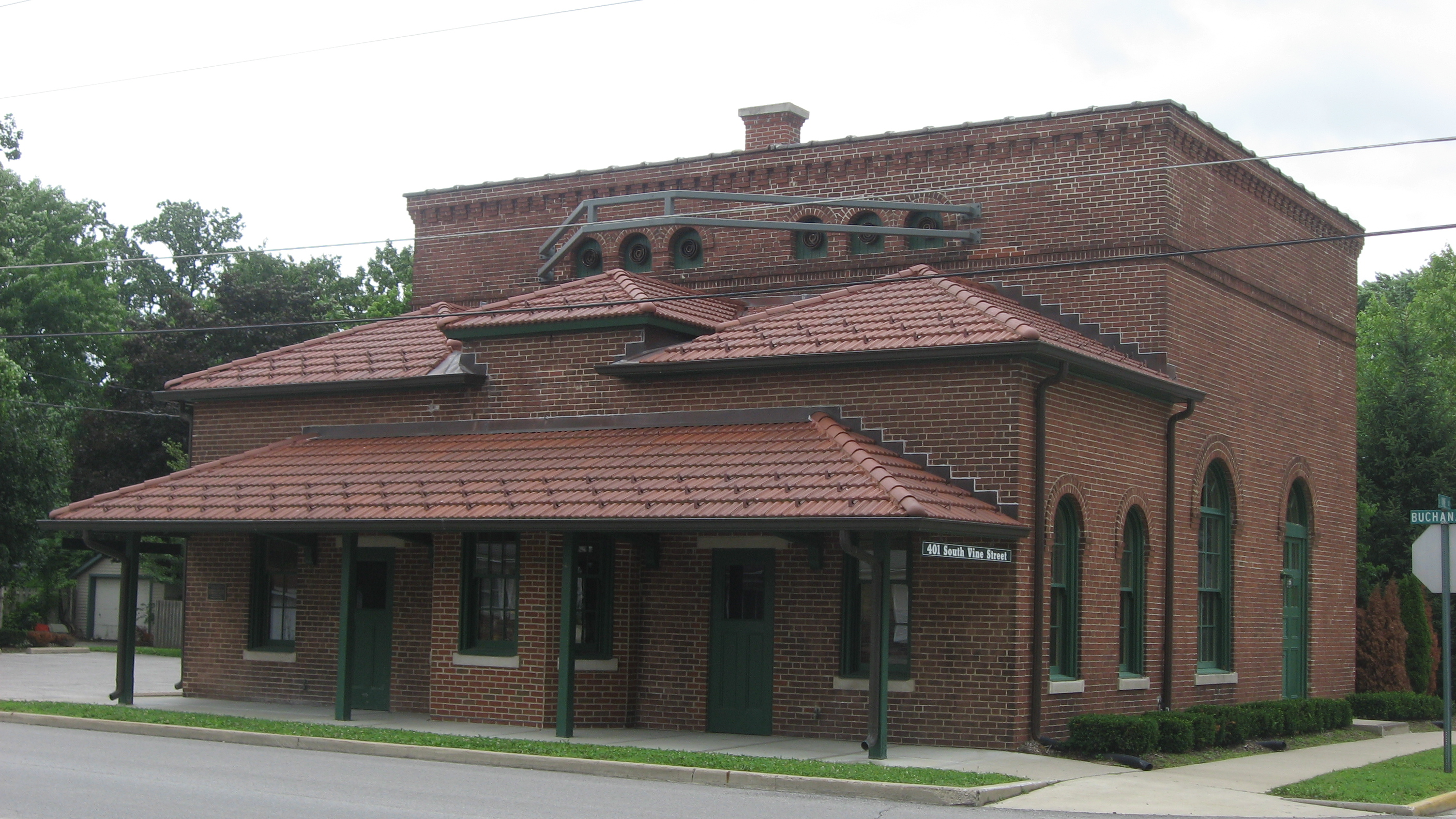
- THI and E Interurban Depot-Substation, June 2011

- Location within Indiana Location within the United States
- Location: 401 S. Vine St., Plainfield, Indiana
- Coordinates: 39°42′1″N 86°24′1″W
- Area: less than one acre
- Built: 1907
- Architectural style: Italianate
- NRHP reference No.: 02001562
- Added to NRHP: December 19, 2002

THI and E Interurban Depot-Substation, also known as Plainfield Interurban Depot, is a historic interurban train station located at Plainfield, Indiana.

== Design ==
The building consisted of a small brick passenger / cargo depot in the front facing the street and track plus a large, two-story repair facility and power conversion AC to DC substation at the rear. Holes in the upper part of the substation walls are where electrical transmission wires entered and left. It has Italianate style design elements in the round arched window openings. The passenger depot section is topped by a series of red clay tile hipped roofs.

The structure is of the same design as the Amo Depot.

== History ==
The station was built in 1907 by the Terre Haute, Indianapolis and Eastern Traction Company. Interurban transportation for Plainfield ceased on January 10, 1940.

The building was subsequently used as an American Legion post. It was added to the National Register of Historic Places in 2002.

Preceding station	Terre Haute, Indianapolis and Eastern Traction Company	Following station
Cartersburg toward Terre Haute	Terre Haute–Indianapolis Line	Indianapolis Terminus

== See also ==
- Amo THI & E Interurban Depot/Substation
