= Franklin Township, Hendricks County, Indiana =

Franklin Township
- Township
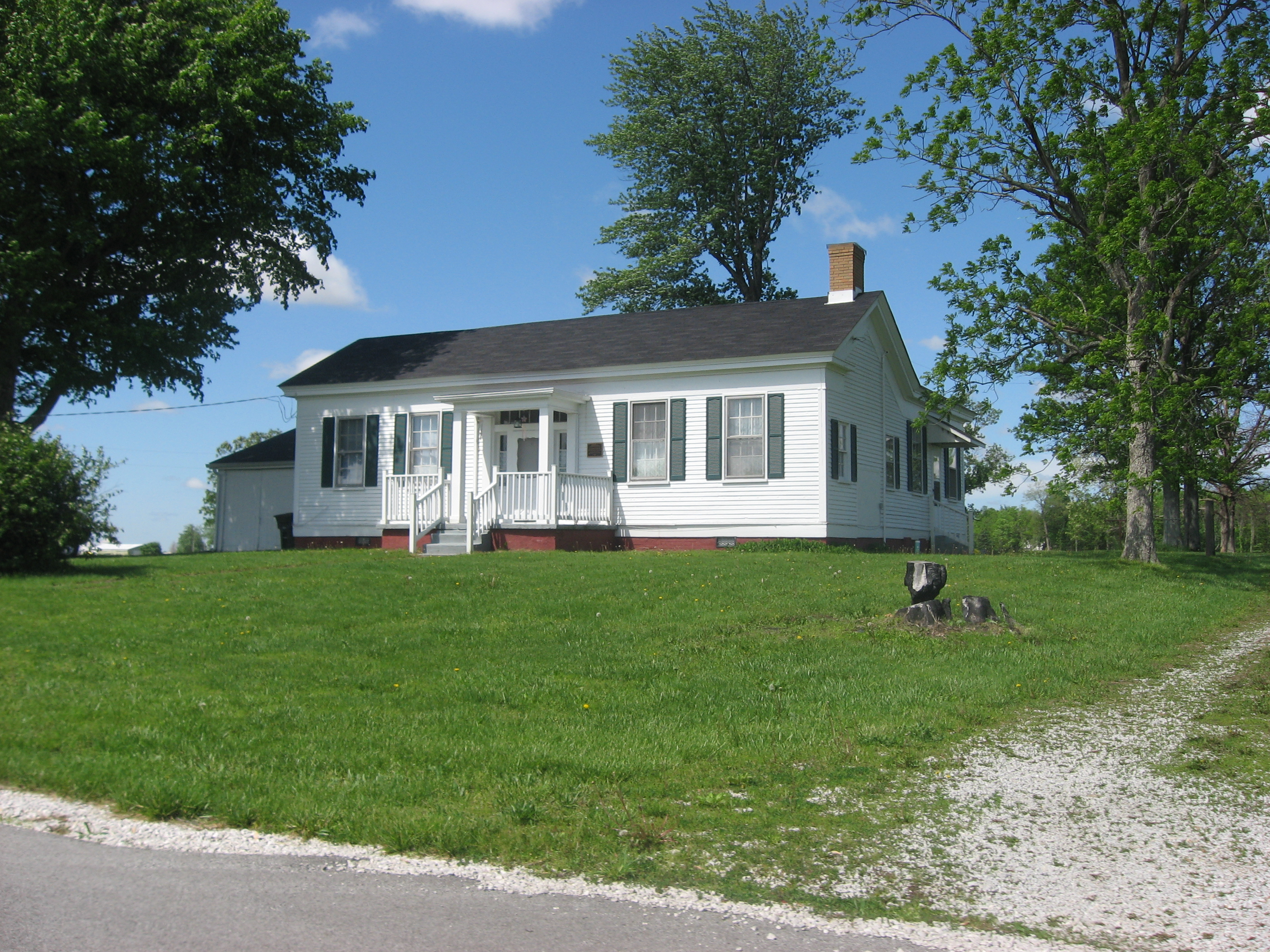
- The McCormack-Bowman House, a historic site in the township's northeastern corner

- Location in Hendricks County
- Coordinates: 39°38′36″N 86°37′22″W
- Country: United States
- State: Indiana
- County: Hendricks

Government
  - Type: Indiana township

Area
  - Total: 26.48 sq mi (68.57 km^{2})
  - Land: 26.44 sq mi (68.47 km^{2})
  - Water: 0.042 sq mi (0.11 km^{2}) 0.16%
- Elevation: 790 ft (240 m)

Population (2020)
  - Total: 1,269
  - Density: 49/sq mi (18.9/km^{2})
- GNIS feature ID: 0453304

Franklin Township is one of twelve townships in Hendricks County, Indiana, United States. As of the 2010 census, its population was 1,297.

== History ==
McCormack-Bowman House was added to the National Register of Historic Places in 1995.

== Geography ==
Franklin Township covers an area of 26.48 square miles (68.6 km^{2}); of this, 0.04 square miles (0.10 km^{2}) or 0.16 percent is water. The streams of Crittenden Creek and East Fork Mill Creek run through this township.

=== Cities and towns ===
- Stilesville

=== Adjacent townships ===
- Clay Township (north)
- Liberty Township (east)
- Monroe Township, Morgan County (east)
- Adams Township, Morgan County (south)
- Jefferson Township, Putnam County (southwest)
- Marion Township, Putnam County (west)

=== Cemeteries ===
The township contains five cemeteries: Hebron Presbyterian, Pleasant Hill, Snoddy Family, Stilesville and Walnut Grove.

=== Major highways ===
- U.S. Route 40
- State Road 75

=== Airports and landing strips ===
- Vaughn Airport
