= Hazelwood, Indiana =

- Unincorporated community
- Location within Indiana Location within the United States
- Coordinates: 39°36′56″N 86°31′19″W
- Country: United States
- State: Indiana
- County: Hendricks
- Township: Liberty
- Named for: Daniel Hazelwood
- Elevation: 817 ft (249 m)
- Time zone: UTC-5 (EST)
  - Summer (DST): UTC-4 (EDT)
- ZIP code: 46118
- Area code(s): 317, 463
- FIPS code: 18-32692
- GNIS feature ID: 435940

Hazelwood is an unincorporated community in Liberty Township, Hendricks County, Indiana.

== History ==
A post office was established at Hazelwood in 1884, and remained in operation until it was discontinued in 1937. The community was named for Daniel Hazelwood, a pioneer settler.

== Geography ==
Hazelwood is located at 39°36′56″N 86°31′19″W.
