= Hadley, Indiana =

- Unincorporated community
- Location within Indiana Location within the United States
- Coordinates: 39°43′53″N 86°36′10″W
- Country: United States
- State: Indiana
- County: Hendricks
- Township: Marion
- Elevation: 892 ft (272 m)
- ZIP code: 46122
- FIPS code: 18-30384
- GNIS feature ID: 435585

Hadley (/ˈhædliː/, HAD-lee) is an unincorporated community in Marion Township, Hendricks County, Indiana.

== History ==
Hadley was platted in 1872. It was named for the Hadley family of settlers.

== Geography ==
Hadley is located at 39°43′53″N 86°36′10″W.

== Notable person ==
- Barzilla W. Clark, 16th governor of Idaho 1937–1939; born in Hadley.
