= Liberty Township, Hendricks County, Indiana =

Liberty Township
- Township
- Logo

- Location in Hendricks County
- Coordinates: 39°40′13″N 86°29′52″W
- Country: United States
- State: Indiana
- County: Hendricks

Government
  - Type: Indiana township

Area
  - Total: 49.48 sq mi (128.14 km^{2})
  - Land: 49.46 sq mi (128.11 km^{2})
  - Water: 0.012 sq mi (0.03 km^{2}) 0.02%
- Elevation: 860 ft (262 m)

Population (2020)
  - Total: 6,055
  - Density: 117/sq mi (45.1/km^{2})
- Time zone: UTC-5 (Eastern (EST))
  - Summer (DST): UTC-4 (EDT)
- GNIS feature ID: 453555
- Website: hendrickslibertytownship.com

Liberty Township is one of twelve townships in Hendricks County, Indiana, United States. As of the 2010 census, its population was 5,772.

== Geography ==
Liberty Township covers an area of 49.48 square miles (128.2 km^{2}); of this, 0.01 square miles (0.026 km^{2}) or 0.02 percent is water. The stream of Cosner Branch runs through this township.

=== Cities and towns ===
- Clayton
- Plainfield (west edge)

=== Unincorporated towns ===
- Belleville
- Cartersburg
- Center Valley
- Hazelwood
- Magnetic Springs
- North Belleville
- Hello, Indiana

(This list is based on USGS data and may include former settlements.)

=== Adjacent townships ===
- Center Township (north)
- Washington Township (northeast)
- Guilford Township (east)
- Monroe Township, Morgan County (south)
- Adams Township, Morgan County (southwest)
- Clay Township (west)
- Franklin Township (west)

=== Cemeteries ===
The township contains twelve cemeteries: Buchanan, Center Valley Friendship Baptist, Clayton, Davis, Friendship Missionary Baptist, Irons, Jones, McCormack, Miles, Salem Methodist, Spring Hill and Ungles.

=== Major highways ===
- Interstate 70
- U.S. Route 40
- State Road 39

=== Airports and landing strips ===
- Cooper Airport 05IN

== Education ==
Liberty Township residents may obtain a free library card from the Clayton-Liberty Township Public Library in Clayton.
