= Clayton, Indiana =

- Town
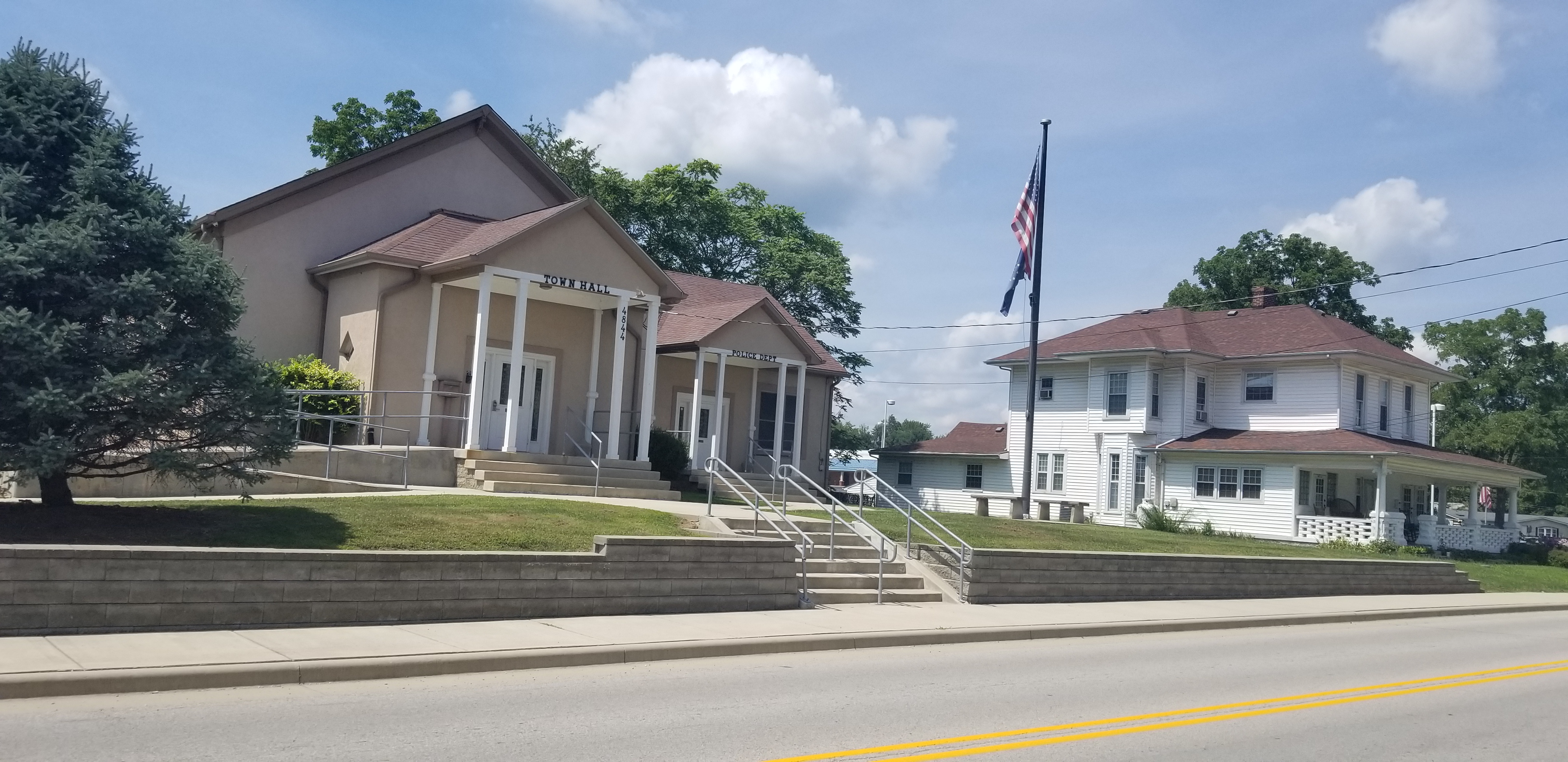
- Town Hall

- Logo

- Location of Clayton in Hendricks County, Indiana.
- Coordinates: 39°41′19″N 86°31′22″W
- Country: United States
- State: Indiana
- County: Hendricks
- Township: Liberty
- Founded: 1829
- Platted: 1851
- Incorporated: 1909

Area
  - Total: 0.65 sq mi (1.68 km^{2})
  - Land: 0.65 sq mi (1.68 km^{2})
  - Water: 0 sq mi (0.00 km^{2})
- Elevation: 876 ft (267 m)

Population (2020)
  - Total: 908
  - Density: 1,397.5/sq mi (539.58/km^{2})
- Time zone: UTC-5 (EST)
  - Summer (DST): UTC-5 (EST)
- ZIP code: 46118
- Area code: 317
- FIPS code: 18-13366
- GNIS feature ID: 2396652
- Website: www.townofclayton.us

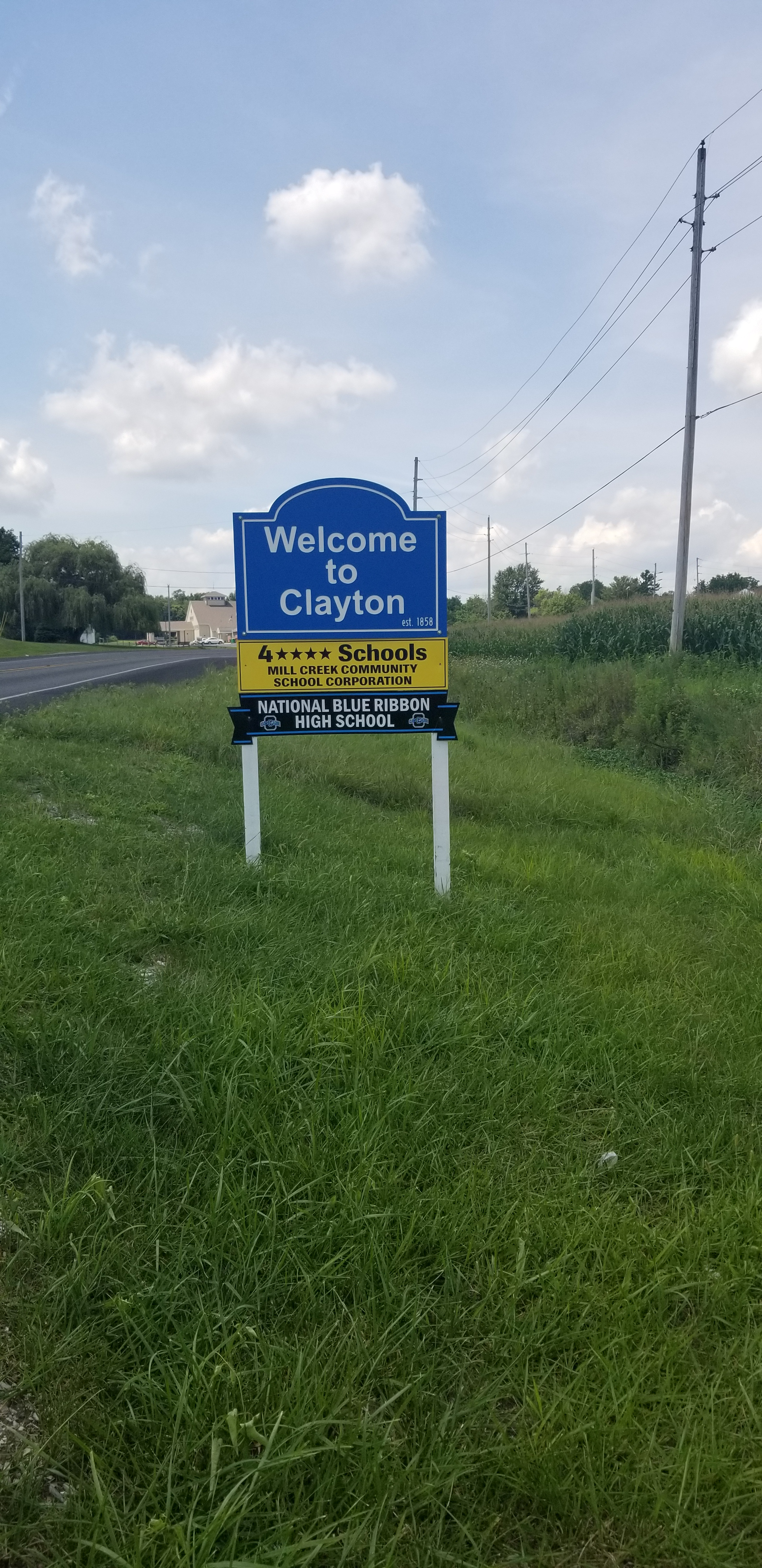
Sign welcoming people to Clayton, Indiana

Clayton is a small town in Liberty Township, Hendricks County, Indiana, United States. The population was 908 at the 2020 census.

== History ==
In 1829 a little town in Liberty Township was named "Clayville", honoring Henry Clay, the Kentucky statesman. In 1835, Clayville consisted of ten houses and 43 people. The Town of Clayville was platted in 1851 by George W. Wills. The name was changed to "Clayton" in 1858 because another Clayville already existed in Dubois County.

The first two houses in Clayton were built by Thomas Potts and Lewis T. Pounds, and Parker & Foote was the first store. George Wills built the first hotel, and John Miles and James Worrell developed the first flouring mill. The first train passed through in 1852. By the early 1900s, the town had electric service, supplied by the Danville Light, Heat and Power Co.

The first schoolhouse built in Clayton was erected in 1867. In the spring of 1868, Howard Mitchell started a subscription school in the new building. The first high school of the township was built in nearby Cartersburg in 1897. In the fall of 1901 the high school was transferred to Clayton, which made it nearer the middle of the township and the center of the school population.

In 1909 the town was incorporated and had a population of 497.

== Geography ==
Clayton is located in southern Hendricks County. Indiana State Road 39 is the main road through the town, leading north 5 miles (8 km) to Danville, the county seat, and southeast 2 miles (3 km) to U.S. Route 40 at Belleville. Via US-40, Plainfield is 7 miles (11 km) east of Clayton. Interstate 70 passes 6 miles (10 km) south of Clayton, with access from State Road 39. Downtown Indianapolis is 24 to 28 miles (39 to 45 km) east of Clayton, depending on which highway is taken.

According to the 2010 census, Clayton has a total area of 0.76 square miles (1.97 km^{2}), all land.

== Entertainment ==
Clayton is known for its annual Fall Festival sponsored by the Clayton Community Association in September, featuring horse pulls, tractor pulls, live bands, food, kids' games, bingo, a parade and more. Clayton also sponsors the annual "Triple F Ride" in June which is a non-profit bike rally starting in Lambert Park. The park is also home to a "Movies in the Park" series on Friday evenings.

== Education ==
It is in the Mill Creek Community School Corporation. Three of the district's four schools are located in Clayton: Mill Creek East Elementary, Cascade Middle School, and Cascade High School, home of the Cadets. In 2018 Cascade won National Blue Ribbon School for Exemplary Performance, the only High School to win in the state of Indiana for 2018.

The town has a lending library, the Clayton-Liberty Township Public Library.

== Demographics ==
Historical population
Census	Pop.	Note	%±
1880	145		—
1910	497		—
1920	493		−0.8%
1930	561		13.8%
1940	558		−0.5%
1950	598		7.2%
1960	653		9.2%
1970	736		12.7%
1980	703		−4.5%
1990	610		−13.2%
2000	693		13.6%
2010	972		40.3%
2020	908		−6.6%
U.S. Decennial Census

=== 2010 census ===
As of the census of 2010, there were 972 people, 358 households, and 255 families living in the town. The population density was 1,278.9 inhabitants per square mile (493.8/km^{2}). There were 383 housing units at an average density of 503.9 per square mile (194.6/km^{2}). The racial makeup of the town was 98.7% White, 0.3% African American, 0.1% Native American, 0.1% from other races, and 0.8% from two or more races. Hispanic or Latino of any race were 0.9% of the population.

There were 358 households, of which 39.4% had children under the age of 18 living with them, 55.9% were married couples living together, 10.6% had a female householder with no husband present, 4.7% had a male householder with no wife present, and 28.8% were non-families. 23.5% of all households were made up of individuals, and 9.2% had someone living alone who was 65 years of age or older. The average household size was 2.72 and the average family size was 3.24.

The median age in the town was 34.3 years. 29% of residents were under the age of 18; 8% were between the ages of 18 and 24; 27% were from 25 to 44; 25.5% were from 45 to 64; and 10.4% were 65 years of age or older. The gender makeup of the town was 51.4% male and 48.6% female.

=== 2000 census ===
As of the census of 2000, there were 693 people, 258 households, and 199 families living in the town. The population density was 1,394.7 inhabitants per square mile (538.5/km^{2}). There were 270 housing units at an average density of 543.4 per square mile (209.8/km^{2}). The racial makeup of the town was 98.41% White, 0.14% African American, 0.29% from other races, and 1.15% from two or more races. Hispanic or Latino of any race were 0.72% of the population.

There were 258 households, out of which 39.5% had children under the age of 18 living with them, 59.7% were married couples living together, 11.2% had a female householder with no husband present, and 22.5% were non-families. 20.2% of all households were made up of individuals, and 7.0% had someone living alone who was 65 years of age or older. The average household size was 2.69 and the average family size was 3.08.

In the town, the population was spread out, with 30.0% under the age of 18, 6.2% from 18 to 24, 34.3% from 25 to 44, 19.3% from 45 to 64, and 10.1% who were 65 years of age or older. The median age was 34 years. For every 100 females, there were 95.2 males. For every 100 females age 18 and over, there were 90.2 males.

The median income for a household in the town was $45,066, and the median income for a family was $47,039. Males had a median income of $40,417 versus $24,500 for females. The per capita income for the town was $21,387. About 2.8% of families and 4.9% of the population were below the poverty line, including 5.1% of those under age 18 and 5.6% of those age 65 or over.
