= Coatesville, Indiana =

- Town
- Town of Coatesville
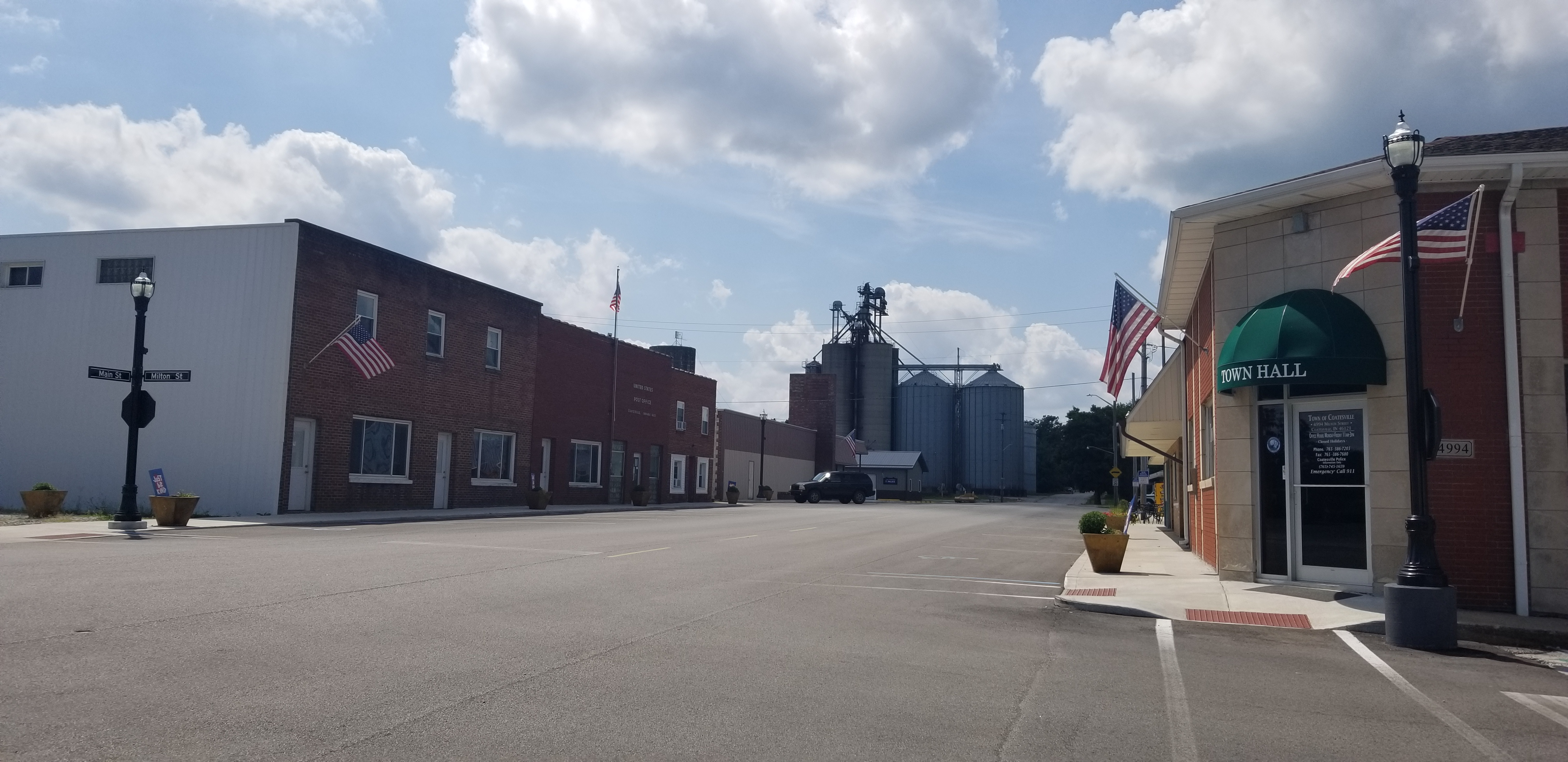
- View down Main Street

- Seal

- Location of Coatesville in Hendricks County, Indiana.
- Coordinates: 39°41′17″N 86°40′11″W
- Country: United States
- State: Indiana
- County: Hendricks
- Township: Clay
- Incorporated: 1909

Area
  - Total: 0.66 sq mi (1.72 km^{2})
  - Land: 0.65 sq mi (1.69 km^{2})
  - Water: 0.012 sq mi (0.03 km^{2})
- Elevation: 876 ft (267 m)

Population (2020)
  - Total: 555
  - Density: 849.4/sq mi (327.96/km^{2})
- Time zone: UTC-5 (EST)
  - Summer (DST): UTC-4 (EDT)
- ZIP code: 46121
- Area code: 765
- FIPS code: 18-14050
- GNIS feature ID: 2396657
- Website: www.coatesvillein.com

Coatesville is a town in Clay Township, Hendricks County, Indiana, United States. The population was 555 at the 2020 Census.

== History ==
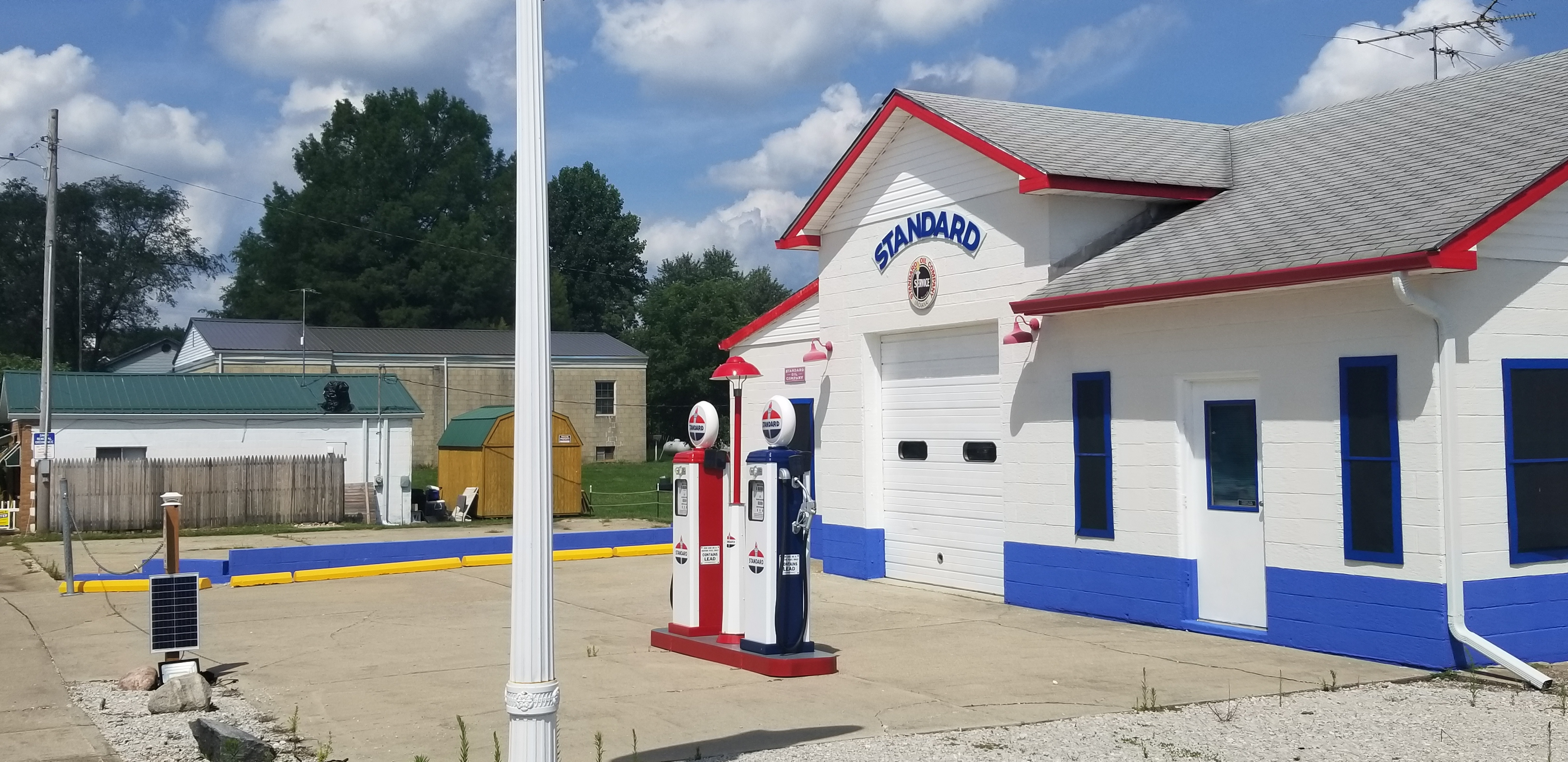
Replica of a 1950s era Standard Oil filling station

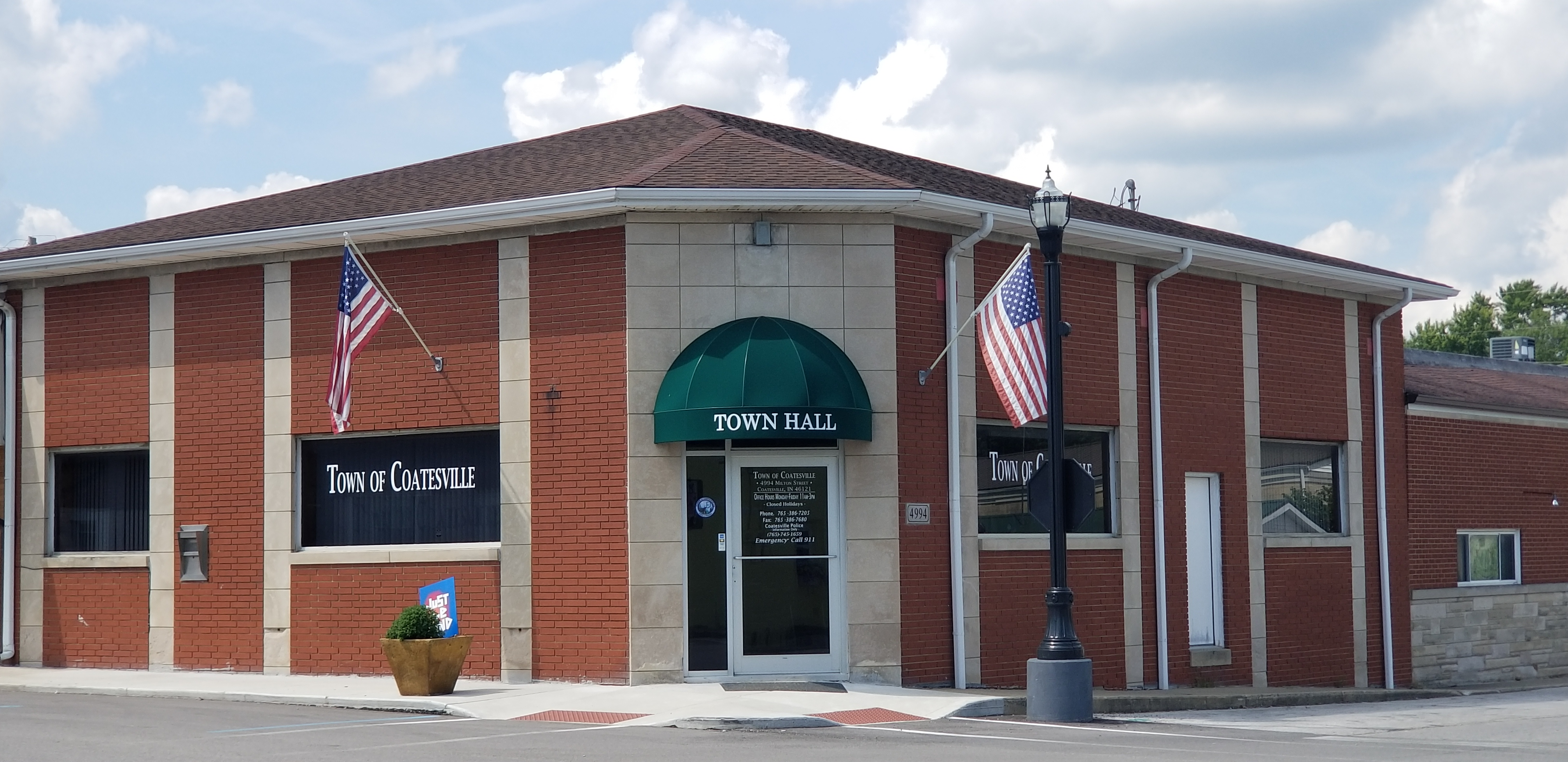
Coatesville Town Hall

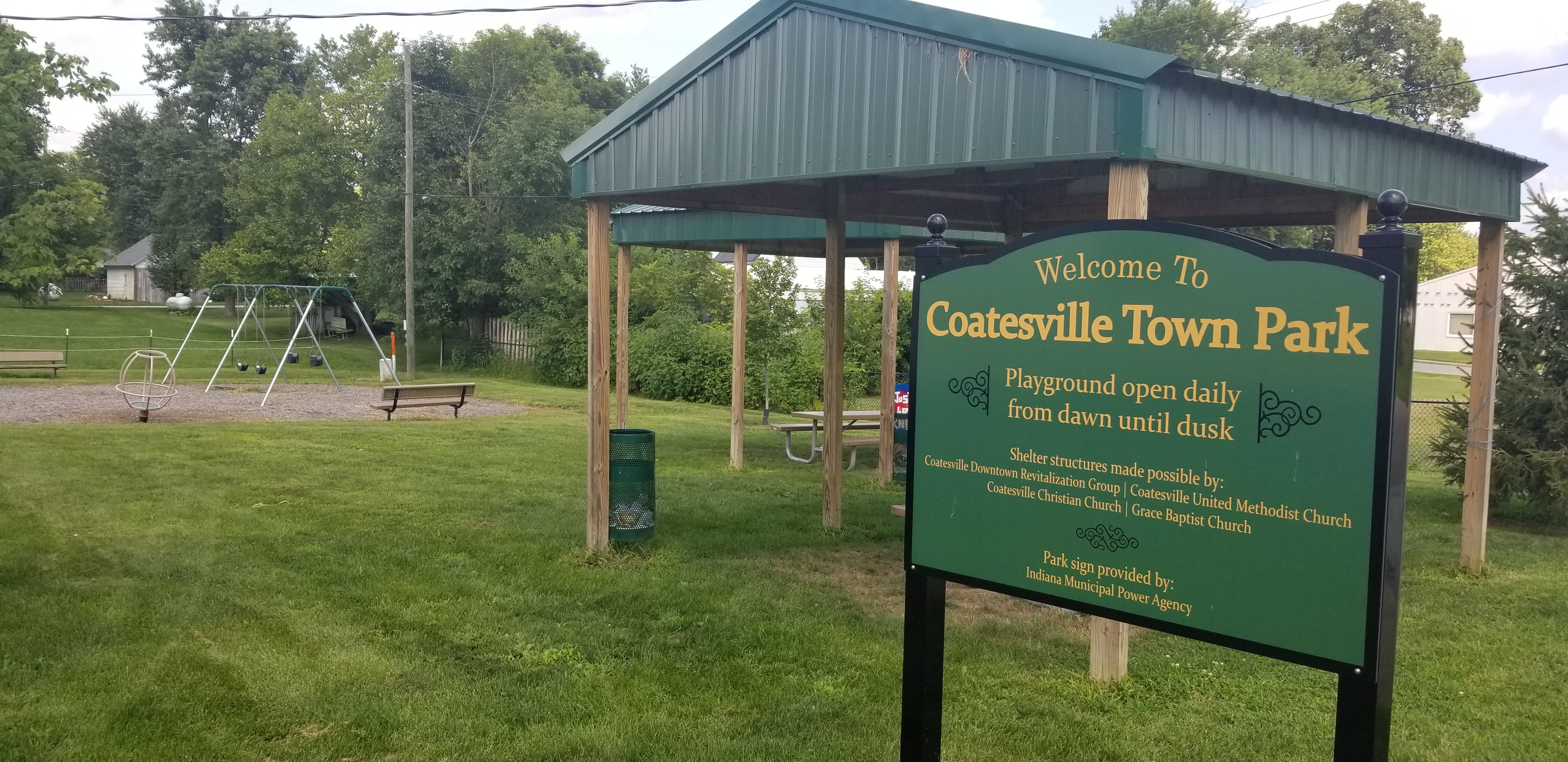
Coatesville Town Park

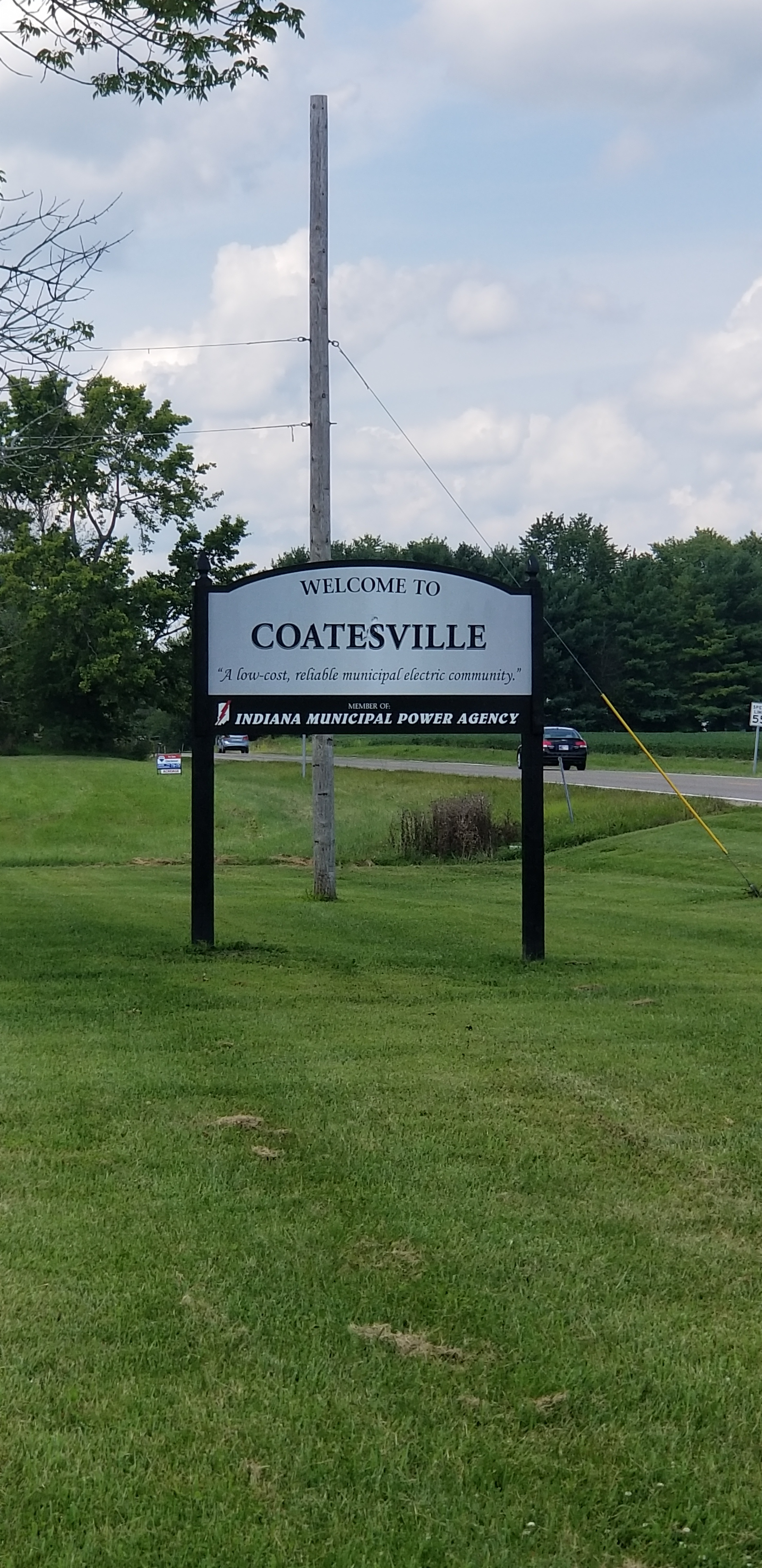
Sign welcoming people to Coatesville

Coatesville was founded in the late 1860s. It was incorporated as a town in 1909.

A filling station was opened in downtown Coatesville in the early 1900s. By 1958 it was operated by Standard Oil. At one time, Coatesville had three filling stations, but as of 2020 it has none. The location of the town's first filling station has been renovated into a replica of the Standard Oil station as it would have looked in the late 1950s.

On March 26, 1948 (Good Friday) a tornado destroyed most of the town, killing 14 residents. Damage and fatalities were widespread across west-central Indiana, and overall, 20 people perished.

== Geography ==
According to the 2010 census, Coatesville has a total area of 0.66 square miles (1.71 km^{2}), of which 0.65 square miles (1.68 km^{2}) (or 98.48%) is land and 0.01 square miles (0.03 km^{2}) (or 1.52%) is water.

== Demographics ==
Historical population
Census	Pop.	Note	%±
1880	499		—
1910	472		—
1920	522		10.6%
1930	434		−16.9%
1940	377		−13.1%
1950	444		17.8%
1960	497		11.9%
1970	453		−8.9%
1980	474		4.6%
1990	469		−1.1%
2000	516		10.0%
2010	523		1.4%
2020	555		6.1%
U.S. Decennial Census

=== 2010 census ===
As of the census of 2010, there were 523 people, 199 households, and 147 families living in the town. The population density was 804.6 inhabitants per square mile (310.7/km^{2}). There were 216 housing units at an average density of 332.3 per square mile (128.3/km^{2}). The racial makeup of the town was 96.7% White, 0.2% Asian, 1.5% from other races, and 1.5% from two or more races. Hispanic or Latino of any race were 1.3% of the population.

There were 199 households, of which 33.7% had children under the age of 18 living with them, 58.3% were married couples living together, 9.0% had a female householder with no husband present, 6.5% had a male householder with no wife present, and 26.1% were non-families. 23.1% of all households were made up of individuals, and 11.5% had someone living alone who was 65 years of age or older. The average household size was 2.63 and the average family size was 3.05.

The median age in the town was 41.4 years. 25.4% of residents were under the age of 18; 9.3% were between the ages of 18 and 24; 19.9% were from 25 to 44; 31.3% were from 45 to 64; and 14.1% were 65 years of age or older. The gender makeup of the town was 49.3% male and 50.7% female.

=== 2000 census ===
As of the census of 2000, there were 516 people, 185 households, and 145 families living in the town. The population density was 776.7 inhabitants per square mile (299.9/km^{2}). There were 201 housing units at an average density of 302.6 per square mile (116.8/km^{2}). The racial makeup of the town was 98.64% White, 0.19% African American, 0.19% Native American, 0.19% from other races, and 0.78% from two or more races. Hispanic or Latino of any race were 0.39% of the population.

There were 185 households, out of which 42.2% had children under the age of 18 living with them, 64.9% were married couples living together, 9.2% had a female householder with no husband present, and 21.6% were non-families. 19.5% of all households were made up of individuals, and 9.2% had someone living alone who was 65 years of age or older. The average household size was 2.79 and the average family size was 3.21.

In the town, the population was spread out, with 32.0% under the age of 18, 9.3% from 18 to 24, 30.8% from 25 to 44, 18.4% from 45 to 64, and 9.5% who were 65 years of age or older. The median age was 31 years. For every 100 females, there were 96.2 males. For every 100 females age 18 and over, there were 84.7 males.

The median income for a household in the town was $40,357, and the median income for a family was $47,000. Males had a median income of $31,842 versus $23,750 for females. The per capita income for the town was $15,387. About 3.0% of families and 4.2% of the population were below the poverty line, including 4.6% of those under age 18 and 6.7% of those age 65 or over.

== Education ==
It is in the Mill Creek Community School Corporation. The district's comprehensive high school is Cascade High School.

The town has a lending library, the Coatesville-Clay Township Public Library.
