= Belleville, Indiana =

- Unincorporated community and Census-designated place
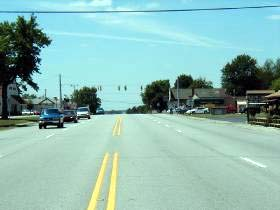
- This is downtown Belleville, looking west, one of few towns along the National Road west of Indianapolis.

- Location within Indiana Location within the United States
- Coordinates: 39°40′24″N 86°29′06″W
- Country: United States
- State: Indiana
- County: Hendricks
- Township: Liberty
- Elevation: 879 ft (268 m)
- ZIP code: 46118
- Area code: 317
- GNIS feature ID: 2830406

Belleville is an unincorporated community in Liberty Township, Hendricks County, Indiana.

== History ==
Belleville was laid out in 1829. The community experienced growth soon after by the building of the National Road through it, but declined in the 1850s when the new railroad missed it by more than a mile.

== Geography ==
Belleville is located between Plainfield and Stilesville at the junction of US 40 and SR 39.

== Demographics ==
The United States Census Bureau delineated Belleville as a census designated place in the 2022 American Community Survey.
