= Hendricks County, Indiana =

County in Indiana, United States

- County
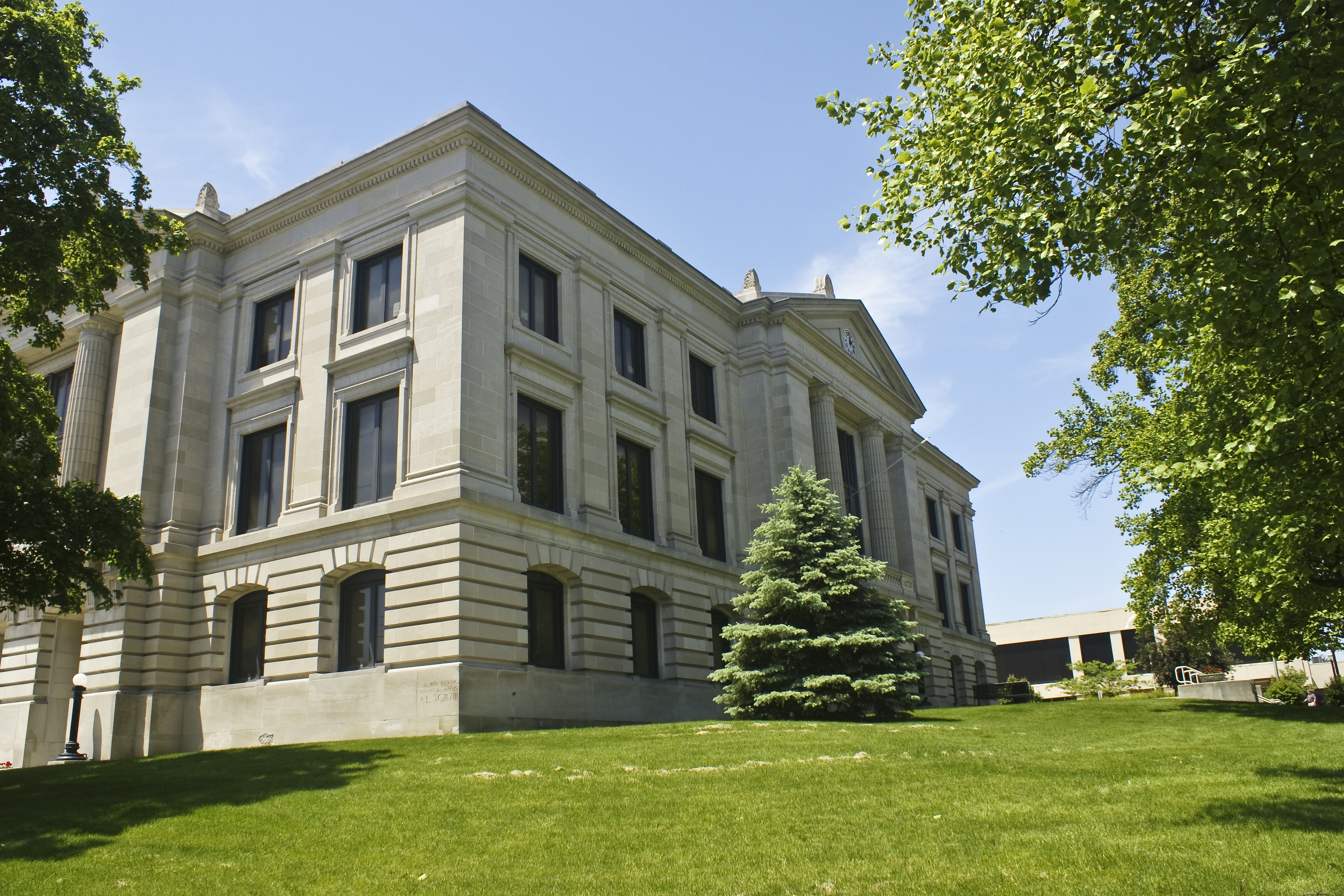
- Hendricks County Courthouse in Danville

- Flag Seal

- Location within the U.S. state of Indiana
- Coordinates: 39°46′N 86°31′W
- Country: United States
- State: Indiana
- Founded: December 20, 1823 (created); Summer 1824 (organized)
- Named for: William Hendricks
- Seat: Danville
- Largest town: Plainfield

Area
  - Total: 408.78 sq mi (1,058.7 km^{2})
  - Land: 406.91 sq mi (1,053.9 km^{2})
  - Water: 1.87 sq mi (4.8 km^{2}) 0.46%

Population (2020)
  - Total: 174,788
  - Estimate (2025): 193,510 ▲
  - Density: 429.55/sq mi (165.85/km^{2})
- Time zone: UTC−5 (Eastern)
  - Summer (DST): UTC−4 (EDT)
- Congressional district: 4th
- Website: www.co.hendricks.in.us
- Indiana county number 32

Hendricks County is a county in the U.S. state of Indiana. As of the 2020 United States census, the population was 174,788. The county seat is the town of Danville. Hendricks County is the third most populous county in the Indianapolis metropolitan area. Hendricks County is currently the second fastest-growing county in Indiana and 85th in the nation.

== History ==
After the American Revolutionary War established US sovereignty over the territory of the upper midwest, the new federal government defined the Northwest Territory in 1787 which included the area of present-day Indiana. In 1800, Congress separated Ohio from the Northwest Territory, designating the rest of the land as the Indiana Territory. President Thomas Jefferson chose William Henry Harrison as the governor of the territory, and Vincennes was established as the future capital. After the Michigan Territory was separated and the Illinois Territory was formed, Indiana was reduced to its current size and geography. By December 1816 the Indiana Territory was admitted to the Union as a state, although much of its territory was still in dispute as to possession by Native Americans. The land containing Hendricks County was brought into the possession of the United States by the Treaty of St. Mary's in 1818 (known as New Purchase).

The eighth General Assembly of the new state of Indiana met at its then-capital town, Corydon, in December 1823, and created three counties before the close of the session, among them being Hendricks, the state's fifty-first county. The bill creating Hendricks County was introduced in the Senate on December 9 and was signed on December 20 by Indiana Governor William Hendricks, in whose honor the new county was named. Until its governing structure was organized, the territory was assigned to neighboring counties for legislative and enforcement matters.

Prior to the New Purchase treaty, the territory of Hendricks County had been occupied by the Dakota tribe, although there were no significant native villages within its future borders. The treaty authorized the territory to be surveyed by the federal government, with land being available for settlement thereafter. This survey work began in the Hendricks County area in 1819, and settlers began moving in as soon thereafter (the first in future Hendricks County in Spring 1820) as land filing was authorized, such that by 1823 there were sufficient inhabitants to justify forming a county. Designated commissioners met in July 1824, and on July 12 selected Danville as its county seat. The town plat was filed for record in October 1824; a court house was erected and in operation there by 1826.

== Geography ==
The county's low rolling hills are entirely devoted to agriculture or urban development, except for wooded drainages. The West Fork of White Lick Creek flows southeastward through the western part of the county and the East Fork flows southward through the east part of the county; the two flows converge at the south county line. The highest point on the terrain (1,030 feet/310 meters ASL) is a small rise 1.5 miles (2.4 km) WNW from Danville.

According to the 2010 United States census, the county has a total area of 408.78 square miles (1,058.7 km^{2}), of which 406.91 square miles (1,053.9 km^{2}) (or 99.54%) is land and 1.87 square miles (4.8 km^{2}) (or 0.46%) is water.

=== Adjacent counties ===
- Boone County - north
- Marion County - east
- Morgan County - south
- Putnam County - west
- Montgomery County - northwest

=== Towns ===
- Amo
- Avon
- Brownsburg
- Clayton
- Coatesville
- Danville - county seat
- Lizton
- North Salem
- Pittsboro
- Plainfield
- Stilesville

=== Unincorporated communities ===
- Belleville
- Camby - part
- Cartersburg
- Clermont Heights
- Friendswood
- Gale
- Hadley
- Hazelwood
- Maplewood
- Montclair
- New Winchester
- Pecksburg
- Raintown
- Reno
- Six Points
- Springtown
- Tilden

=== Townships ===
- Brown
- Center
- Clay
- Eel River
- Franklin
- Guilford
- Liberty
- Lincoln
- Marion
- Middle
- Union
- Washington

== Climate ==
Danville, Indiana

Climate chart (precipitation, max. and min. temperature)
J	F	M	A	M	J	J	A	S	O	N	D
2.5 34 18	2.4 40 23	3.4 51 32	3.6 63 41	4.4 74 52	4.1 82 61	4.4 86 65	3.8 84 63	2.9 77 55	2.8 66 44	3.6 52 34	3 39 24
- █ Average max. and min. temperatures in °F
- █ Precipitation totals in inches
- Source: The Weather Channel
Metric conversion
J	F	M	A	M	J	J	A	S	O	N	D
63 1 −8	61 4 −5	87 11 0	92 17 5	111 23 11	105 28 16	112 30 18	97 29 17	73 25 13	70 19 7	92 11 1	77 4 −4
- █ Average max. and min. temperatures in °C
- █ Precipitation totals in mm

In recent years, average temperatures in Danville have ranged from a low of 18 °F (−8 °C) in January to a high of 86 °F (30 °C) in July, although a record low of −27 °F (−33 °C) was recorded in January 1994 and a record high of 106 °F (41 °C) was recorded in July 1936. Average monthly precipitation ranged from 2.41 inches (61 mm) in February to 4.42 inches (112 mm) in July.

== Transportation ==
=== Airport ===
- 2R2 - Hendricks County Airport

=== Major highways ===
- I-65
- I-70
- I-74
- US 36
- US 40
- US 136
- SR 39
- SR 67
- SR 75
- SR 234
- SR 236
- SR 267

=== Transit ===
- Central Indiana Regional Transportation Authority

== Demographics ==
Historical population
Census	Pop.	Note	%±
1830	3,975		—
1840	11,264		183.4%
1850	14,083		25.0%
1860	16,953		20.4%
1870	20,277		19.6%
1880	22,981		13.3%
1890	21,498		−6.5%
1900	21,292		−1.0%
1910	20,840		−2.1%
1920	20,291		−2.6%
1930	19,725		−2.8%
1940	20,151		2.2%
1950	24,594		22.0%
1960	40,896		66.3%
1970	53,974		32.0%
1980	69,804		29.3%
1990	75,717		8.5%
2000	104,093		37.5%
2010	145,448		39.7%
2020	174,788		20.2%
2025 (est.)	193,510	▲	10.7%
US Decennial Census; 1790-1960 1900-1990; 1990-2000 2010

Age and gender distribution in Hendricks County

=== Racial and ethnic composition ===
Hendricks County, Indiana – Racial and ethnic composition Note: the US Census treats Hispanic/Latino as an ethnic category. This table excludes Latinos from the racial categories and assigns them to a separate category. Hispanics/Latinos may be of any race.
Race / Ethnicity (NH = Non-Hispanic)	Pop 1980	Pop 1990	Pop 2000	Pop 2010	Pop 2020	% 1980	% 1990	% 2000	% 2010	% 2020
White alone (NH)	68,896	74,256	99,978	128,664	139,374	98.70%	98.07%	96.05%	88.46%	79.74%
Black or African American alone (NH)	344	679	1,143	6,988	13,350	0.49%	0.90%	1.10%	4.80%	7.64%
Native American or Alaska Native alone (NH)	64	146	235	231	264	0.09%	0.19%	0.23%	0.16%	0.15%
Asian alone (NH)	168	268	674	2,984	5,667	0.24%	0.35%	0.65%	2.05%	3.24%
Native Hawaiian or Pacific Islander alone (NH)	x	x	32	47	66	x	x	0.03%	0.03%	0.04%
Other race alone (NH)	60	15	61	193	729	0.09%	0.02%	0.06%	0.13%	0.42%
Mixed race or Multiracial (NH)	x	x	808	1,962	7,282	x	x	0.78%	1.35%	4.17%
Hispanic or Latino (any race)	272	353	1,162	4,379	8,056	0.39%	0.47%	1.12%	3.01%	4.61%
Total	69,804	75,717	104,093	145,448	174,788	100.00%	100.00%	100.00%	100.00%	100.00%

=== 2020 census ===
As of the 2020 census, the county had a population of 174,788. The median age was 38.4 years. 25.4% of residents were under the age of 18 and 15.0% of residents were 65 years of age or older. For every 100 females there were 98.5 males, and for every 100 females age 18 and over there were 96.1 males age 18 and over.

The racial makeup of the county was 80.7% White, 7.7% Black or African American, 0.2% American Indian and Alaska Native, 3.3% Asian, <0.1% Native Hawaiian and Pacific Islander, 1.8% from some other race, and 6.2% from two or more races. Hispanic or Latino residents of any race comprised 4.6% of the population.

84.8% of residents lived in urban areas, while 15.2% lived in rural areas.

There were 64,109 households in the county, of which 36.5% had children under the age of 18 living in them. Of all households, 57.9% were married-couple households, 14.2% were households with a male householder and no spouse or partner present, and 21.9% were households with a female householder and no spouse or partner present. About 22.0% of all households were made up of individuals and 9.2% had someone living alone who was 65 years of age or older.

There were 66,869 housing units, of which 4.1% were vacant. Among occupied housing units, 76.2% were owner-occupied and 23.8% were renter-occupied. The homeowner vacancy rate was 0.8% and the rental vacancy rate was 7.5%.

=== 2010 census ===
As of the 2010 United States census, there were 145,448 people, 52,368 households, and 39,698 families in the county. The population density was 357.4 inhabitants per square mile (138.0/km^{2}). There were 55,454 housing units at an average density of 136.3 per square mile (52.6/km^{2}). The racial makeup of the county was 90.1% white, 4.9% black or African American, 2.1% Asian, 0.2% American Indian, 1.1% from other races, and 1.6% from two or more races. Those of Hispanic or Latino origin made up 3.0% of the population. In terms of ancestry, 28.3% were German, 16.2% were English, 15.2% were Irish, and 9.4% were American.

Of the 52,368 households, 40.3% had children under the age of 18 living with them, 61.9% were married couples living together, 9.8% had a female householder with no husband present, 24.2% were non-families, and 19.8% of all households were made up of individuals. The average household size was 2.71 and the average family size was 3.12. The median age was 36.7 years.

The median income for a household in the county was $47,697 and the median income for a family was $77,397. Males had a median income of $54,945 versus $38,919 for females. The per capita income for the county was $28,880. About 4.3% of families and 5.7% of the population were below the poverty line, including 7.3% of those under age 18 and 5.3% of those age 65 or over.

== Government and politics ==
The county government is a constitutional body, and is granted specific powers by the Constitution of Indiana, and by the Indiana Code.

County Council: The legislative branch of the county government; controls spending and revenue collection in the county. Representatives are elected to four-year terms from county districts. They set salaries, the annual budget, and special spending. The council has limited authority to impose local taxes, in the form of an income and property tax that is subject to state level approval, excise taxes, and service taxes.

Board of Commissioners: The executive body of the county; commissioners are elected county-wide to staggered four-year terms. One commissioner serves as president. The commissioners execute acts legislated by the council, collect revenue, and manage the county government.

Courts: The county has six trial courts consisting of a circuit court and five superior courts, the judges of which are elected to 6-year terms in a countywide election. In addition, two magistrates appointed by the elected judges serve the county as judicial officers. There are currently three town courts that also operate in Hendricks County, one each in Avon, Brownsburg, and Plainfield.

County Officials: The county has other elected offices, including sheriff, coroner, auditor, treasurer, recorder, surveyor, and circuit court clerk. These officers are elected to four-year terms. Members elected to county government positions are required to declare party affiliations and to be residents of the county.

Hendricks County is part of Indiana's 4th congressional district, Indiana Senate districts 23 and 24, and Indiana House of Representatives districts 28, 40, 47, and 91.

Hendricks County is a Republican stronghold. In only one election (1912) was the county carried by a Democratic presidential candidate since 1888.

United States presidential election results for Hendricks County, Indiana
Year	Republican		Democratic		Third party(ies)	
Year	No.	%	No.	%	No.	%
1888	3,297	58.62%	2,083	37.04%	244	4.34%
1892	3,020	56.35%	2,028	37.84%	311	5.80%
1896	3,409	58.06%	2,365	40.28%	98	1.67%
1900	3,426	57.65%	2,359	39.69%	158	2.66%
1904	3,434	58.82%	2,164	37.07%	240	4.11%
1908	3,231	54.28%	2,571	43.19%	151	2.54%
1912	1,439	26.15%	2,372	43.10%	1,692	30.75%
1916	3,046	53.13%	2,453	42.79%	234	4.08%
1920	6,293	59.20%	4,192	39.44%	145	1.36%
1924	5,766	61.02%	3,489	36.92%	194	2.05%
1928	5,954	64.79%	3,181	34.61%	55	0.60%
1932	5,317	49.15%	5,293	48.93%	207	1.91%
1936	5,776	52.05%	5,237	47.19%	84	0.76%
1940	6,782	57.92%	4,883	41.70%	45	0.38%
1944	6,673	60.45%	4,297	38.93%	69	0.63%
1948	6,327	59.23%	4,280	40.07%	75	0.70%
1952	9,712	66.58%	4,793	32.86%	81	0.56%
1956	10,578	65.58%	5,521	34.23%	30	0.19%
1960	12,490	65.51%	6,481	33.99%	95	0.50%
1964	11,497	56.34%	8,857	43.41%	51	0.25%
1968	12,597	59.89%	5,155	24.51%	3,280	15.60%
1972	17,699	79.89%	4,384	19.79%	70	0.32%
1976	16,725	64.07%	9,066	34.73%	313	1.20%
1980	19,366	68.88%	7,412	26.36%	1,339	4.76%
1984	21,307	75.73%	6,659	23.67%	169	0.60%
1988	22,090	74.12%	7,643	25.65%	70	0.23%
1992	18,373	55.45%	7,071	21.34%	7,692	23.21%
1996	22,293	63.14%	9,392	26.60%	3,621	10.26%
2000	28,651	71.23%	10,786	26.82%	784	1.95%
2004	38,430	73.48%	13,548	25.90%	324	0.62%
2008	39,728	61.07%	24,548	37.73%	778	1.20%
2012	44,312	66.37%	21,112	31.62%	1,337	2.00%
2016	48,337	63.45%	22,600	29.67%	5,247	6.89%
2020	53,802	60.65%	32,604	36.76%	2,299	2.59%
2024	49,783	59.65%	31,917	38.25%	1,753	2.10%

== Education ==
School districts with territory in the county include:

- Avon Community School Corporation
- Brownsburg Community School Corporation
- Danville Community School Corporation
- Mill Creek Community School Corporation
- North West Hendricks Schools
- Plainfield Community School Corporation

== See also ==
- National Register of Historic Places listings in Hendricks County, Indiana
