= Cartersburg, Indiana =

- Unincorporated community and Census-designated place
- Location within Indiana Location within the United States
- Coordinates: 39°41′57″N 86°27′58″W
- Country: United States
- State: Indiana
- County: Hendricks
- Township: Liberty
- Elevation: 781 ft (238 m)
- ZIP code: 46168
- FIPS code: 18-10594
- GNIS feature ID: 2830407

Cartersburg is an unincorporated community in Liberty Township, Hendricks County, Indiana.

== History ==
Cartersburg had its start in the year 1850 by the building of the railroad through that territory. It was named for its founder, John Carter. Cartersburg contained a post office from 1852 until 1992.

== Geography ==
Cartersburg is located between Clayton and Plainfield. It has a community church. Cartersburg also has a small children's playground.

The Cartersburg Springs (also known as the Magnetic Springs) were located near the town; however, water no longer flows at the site.

== Demographics ==
The United States Census Bureau delineated Cartersburg as a census designated place in the 2022 American Community Survey.
