= Justice Hughes =

Justice Hughes may refer to:

- Anthony Hughes, Lord Hughes of Ombersley (born 1948), Lord Justice of Appeal of the Court of Appeal of England and Wales
- Charles Evans Hughes (1862–1948), chief justice of the United States Supreme Court
- Frank Joseph Hughes (1883–1967), associate justice of the Supreme Court of Canada
- Henry P. Hughes (1904–1968), associate justice of the Wisconsin Supreme Court
- James P. Hughes (1874–1961), associate justice of the Supreme Court of Indiana
- Jefferson D. Hughes III (born 1952), associate justice of the Louisiana Supreme Court
- Lisabeth Tabor Hughes (born 1955), associate justice of the Kentucky Supreme Court
- Richard J. Hughes (1909–1992), chief justice of the New Jersey Supreme Court
- Samuel Hughes (judge) (1913–2002), justice of the Supreme Court of Ontario

== See also ==
- Judge Hughes (disambiguation)
