= NBA Coach of the Month =

National Basketball Association award

The National Basketball Association's Coach of the Month award has been presented monthly by the National Basketball Association (NBA) since the 1982–83 NBA season. It recognizes coaches for their outstanding performance during a given month. Since the 2002-2003 NBA season, the award has honored two coaches each month—one from the Eastern Conference and one from the Western Conference—to equally recognize both conferences. The first recipient of the award in November 1982 was Scotty Robertson, coach of the Detroit Pistons, whose team held an 11–6 record that month.

As of March 2025, the most recent winners of the Coach of the Month award are Mark Daigneault of the Oklahoma City Thunder (Western Conference) and J.B. Bickerstaff of the Detroit Pistons (Eastern Conference).

Like the Coach of the Year award, the Coach of the Month award is determined through evaluation of a team's win-loss record, scoring, defense, and other performance factors. Over 23 years, the award has been presented 362 times, with several coaches receiving it multiple times within a single season. A total of 99 coaches have received the award, with coach Gregg Popovich earning it a record seventeen times.

== Notable recipients ==
Among the top five most recognized coaches, Popovich is the only one to have won exclusively with one team, the San Antonio Spurs. The other four most recognized coaches are Doc Rivers (fourteen wins), George Karl (twelve wins), Phil Jackson (eleven wins), and Pat Riley (eleven wins). Notably, George Karl holds the record for winning with six different teams during his tenure as a coach, while Doc Rivers and Pat Riley won with three teams, and Phil Jackson with two.

While there are approximately ten coaches who have won the award in back-to-back months of the same season, only four coaches have won the award three times in one season. These coaches are Tom Thibodeau with the Chicago Bulls during the 2010-2011 season, Mike Brown with the Cleveland Cavaliers during the 2008-2009 season, Doc Rivers with the Boston Celtics during the 2007-2008 season, and Flip Saunders with the Detroit Pistons during the 2005-2006 season, the first coach to ever do so. Of these four coaches, only Doc Rivers and the Boston Celtics went on to win the 2008 NBA Finals (4-2) against the Los Angeles Lakers.

== Winners ==
Season	Coach	Team	Conference	Month	Nationality
2024-2025	Mark Daigneault	Oklahoma City Thunder	West	February	United States
2024-2025	J.B. Bickerstaff	Detroit Pistons	East	February	United States
2024-2025	Ime Udoka	Houston Rockets	West	January	United States/Nigeria
2024-2025	Rick Carlisle	Indiana Pacers	East	January	United States
2024-2025	Mark Daignault	Oklahoma City Thunder	West	December	United States
2024-2025	Kenny Atkinson	Cleveland Cavaliers	East	December	United States
2024-2025	Ime Udoka	Houston Rockets	West	November	United States/Nigeria
2024-2025	Kenny Atkinson	Cleveland Cavaliers	East	November	United States
2023-2024	Ime Udoka	Houston Rockets	West	March	United States/Nigeria
2023-2024	Joe Mazzulla	Boston Celtics	East	March	United States
2023-2024	Steve Kerr	Golden State Warriors	West	February	United States
2023-2024	Erik Spoelstra	Miami Heat	East	February	United States
2023-2024	Tyronn Lue	Los Angeles Clippers	West	January	United States
2023-2024	Tom Thibodeau	New York Knicks	East	January	United States
2023-2024	Tyronn Lue	Los Angeles Clippers	West	December	United States
2023-2024	Joe Mazzulla	Boston Celtics	East	December	United States
2023-2024	Chris Finch	Minnesota Timberwolves	West	November	United States
2023-2024	Jamahl Mosley	Orlando Magic	East	November	United States
2022-2023	Taylor Jenkins	Memphis Grizzlies	West	March	United States
2022-2023	Doc Rivers	Philadelphia Sixers	East	March	United States
2022-2023	Mike Brown	Sacramento Kings	West	February	United States
2022-2023	Mike Budenholzer	Milwaukee Bucks	East	February	United States
2022-2023	Michael Malone	Denver Nuggets	West	January	United States
2022-2023	Doc Rivers	Philadelphia 76ers	East	January	United States
2022-2023	Willie Green	New Orleans Pelicans	West	December	United States
2022-2023	Jacque Vaughn	Brooklyn Nets	East	December	United States
2022-2023	Monty Williams	Phoenix Suns	West	November	United States
2022-2023	Joe Mazzulaa	Boston Celtics	East	November	United States
2021-2022	Jason Kidd	Dallas Mavericks	West	March	United States
2021-2022	Ime Udoka	Boston Celtics	East	March	United States/Nigeria
2021-2022	Quin Snyder	Utah Jazz	West	February	United States
2021-2022	Ime Udoka	Boston Celtics	East	February	United States/Nigeria
2021-2022	Monty Williams	Phoenix Suns	West	January	United States
2021-2022	J.B. Bickerstaff	Cleveland Cavaliers	East	January	United States
2021-2022	Taylor Jenkins	Memphis Grizzlies	West	December	United States
2021-2022	Erik Spoelstra	Miami Heat	East	December	United States
2021-2022	Monty Williams	Phoenix Suns	West	November	United States
2021-2022	Billy Donovan	Chicago Bulls	East	November	United States
2020-2021	Terry Stotts	Portland Trail Blazers	West	May	United States
2020-2021	Tom Thibodeau	New York Knicks	East	May	United States
2020-2021	Michael Malone	Denver Nuggets	West	April	United States
2020-2021	Scott Brooks	Washington Wizards	East	April	United States
2020-2021	Monty Williams	Phoenix Suns	West	March	United States
2020-2021	Nate McMillan	Atlanta Hawks	East	March	United States
2020-2021	Quin Snyder	Utah Jazz	West	February	United States
2020-2021	Steve Nash	Brooklyn Nets	East	February	United States
2020-2021	Quin Snyder	Utah Jazz	West	January	United States
2020-2021	Doc Rivers	Philadelphia 76ers	East	January	United States
2019-2020	Mike D'Antoni	Houston Rockets	West	February	United States/Italy
2019-2020	Mike Budenholzer	Milwaukee Bucks	East	February	United States
2019-2020	Taylor Jenkins	Milwaukee Bucks	West	January	United States
2019-2020	Nick Nurse	Toronto Raptors	East	January	United States
2019-2020	Billy Donovan	Oklahoma City Thunder	West	December	United States
2019-2020	Mike Budenholzer	Milwaukee Bucks	East	December	United States
2019-2020	Frank Vogel	Los Angeles Lakers	West	November	United States
2019-2020	Nick Nurse	Toronto Raptors	East	November	United States
2018-2019	Terry Stotts	Portland Trail Blazers	West	March	United States
2018-2019	Steve Clifford	Orlando Magic	East	March	United States
2018-2019	Terry Stotts	Portland Trail Blazers	West	February	United States
2018-2019	Mike Budenholzer	Milwaukee Bucks	East	February	United States
2018-2019	Steve Kerr	Golden State Warriors	West	January	United States
2018-2019	Mike Budenholzer	Milwaukee Bucks	East	January	United States
2018-2019	Mike D'Antoni	Houston Rockets	West	December	United States/Italy
2018-2019	Nate McMillan	Indiana Pacers	East	December	United States
2018-2019	Doc Rivers	Los Angeles Clippers	West	November	United States
2018-2019	Nick Nurse	Toronto Raptors	East	November	United States
2017-2018	Quin Snyder	Utah Jazz	West	March	United States
2017-2018	Brett Brown	Philadelphia 76ers	East	March	United States
2017-2018	Mike D'Antoni	Houston Rockets	West	February	United States/Italy
2017-2018	Scott Brooks	Washington Wizards	East	February	United States
2017-2018	Terry Stotts	Portland Trail Blazers	West	January	United States
2017-2018	Erik Spoelstra	Miami Heat	East	January	United States
2017-2018	Steve Kerr	Golden State Warriors	West	December	United States
2017-2018	Dwane Casey	Toronto Raptors	East	December	United States
2017-2018	Mike D'Antoni	Houston Rockets	West	November	United States/Italy
2017-2018	Brad Stevens	Boston Celtics	East	November	United States
2016-2017	Doc Rivers	Los Angeles Clippers	West	April	United States
2016-2017	Nate McMillan	Indiana Pacers	West	April	United States
2016-2017	Terry Stotts	Portland Trail Blazers	West	March	United States
2016-2017	Jason Kidd	Milwaukee Bucks	East	March	United States
2016-2017	Gregg Popovich	San Antonio Spurs	West	February	United States
2016-2017	Erik Spoelstra	Miami Heat	East	February	United States
2016-2017	Steve Kerr	Golden State Warriors	West	January	United States
2016-2017	Scott Brooks	Washington Wizards	East	January	United States
2016-2017	Mike D'Antoni	Houston Rockets	West	December	United States/Italy
2016-2017	Dwane Casey	Toronto Raptors	East	December	United States
2016-2017	Steve Kerr	Golden State Warriors	West	November	United States
2016-2017	Tyronn Lue	Cleveland Cavaliers	East	November	United States
2015-2016	Doc Rivers	Los Angeles Clippers	West	April	United States
2015-2016	Frank Vogel	Indiana Pacers	East	April	United States
2015-2016	Steve Kerr	Golden State Warriors	West	March	United States
2015-2016	Steve Clifford	Charlotte Hornets	East	March	United States
2015-2016	Terry Stotts	Portland Trail Blazers	West	February	United States
2015-2016	Brad Stevens	Boston Celtics	East	February	United States
2015-2016	Doc Rivers	Los Angeles Clippers	West	January	United States
2015-2016	Dwane Casey	Toronto Raptors	East	January	United States
2015-2016	Gregg Popovich	San Antonio Spurs	West	December	United States
2015-2016	Scott Skiles	Orlando Magic	East	December	United States
2015-2016	Luke Walton	Golden State Warriors	West	November	United States
2015-2016	David Blatt	Cleveland Cavaliers	East	November	United States
2014-2015	Doc Rivers	Los Angeles Clippers	West	April	United States
2014-2015	Brad Stevens	Boston Celtics	East	April	United States
2014-2015	Steve Kerr	Golden State Warriors	West	March	United States
2014-2015	David Blatt	Cleveland Cavaliers	East	March	United States
2014-2015	Scott Brooks	Washington Wizards	West	February	United States
2014-2015	Frank Vogel	Indiana Pacers	East	February	United States
2014-2015	Steve Kerr	Golden State Warriors	West	January	United States
2014-2015	Mike Budenholzer	Atlanta Hawks	East	January	United States
2014-2015	Terry Stotts	Portland Trail Blazers	West	December	United States
2014-2015	Mike Budenholzer	Atlanta Hawks	East	December	United States
2014-2015	Dave Joerger	Memphis Grizzlies	West	November	United States
2014-2015	Dwane Casey	Toronto Raptors	East	November	United States
2013-2014	Dave Joerger	Memphis Grizzlies	West	April	United States
2013-2014	Steve Clifford	Charlotte Bobcats	East	April	United States
2013-2014	Gregg Popovich	San Antonio Spurs	West	March	United States
2013-2014	Jason Kidd	Brooklyn Nets	East	March	United States
2013-2014	Kevin McHale	Houston Rockets	West	February	United States
2013-2014	Erik Spoelstra	Miami Heat	East	February	United States
2013-2014	Dave Joerger	Memphis Grizzlies	West	January	United States
2013-2014	Jason Kidd	Brooklyn Nets	East	January	United States
2013-2014	Jeff Hornacek	Phoenix Suns	West	December	United States
2013-2014	Dwane Casey	Toronto Raptors	East	December	United States
2013-2014	Terry Stotts	Portland Trail Blazers	West	November	United States
2013-2014	Frank Vogel	Indiana Pacers	East	November	United States
2012-2013	Mike D'Antoni	Los Angeles Lakers	West	April	United States/Italy
2012-2013	Mike Woodson	New York Knicks	East	April	United States
2012-2013	George Karl	Denver Nuggets	West	March	United States
2012-2013	Erik Spoelstra	Miami Heat	East	March	United States
2012-2013	Lionel Hollins	Memphis Grizzlies	West	February	United States
2012-2013	Erik Spoelstra	Miami Heat	East	February	United States
2012-2013	George Karl	Denver Nuggets	West	January	United States
2012-2013	Tom Thibodeau	Chicago Bulls	East	January	United States
2012-2013	Vinny Del Negro	Los Angeles Clippers	West	December	United States
2012-2013	Larry Drew	Atlanta Hawks	East	December	United States
2012-2013	Lionel Hollins	Memphis Grizzlies	West	November	United States
2012-2013	Avery Johnson	Brooklyn Nets	East	November	United States
2011-2012	Lionel Hollins	Memphis Grizzlies	West	April	United States
2011-2012	Frank Vogel	Indiana Pacers	East	April	United States
2011-2012	Gregg Popovich	San Antonio Spurs	West	March	United States
2011-2012	Tom Thibodeau	Chicago Bulls	East	March	United States
2011-2012	Gregg Popovich	San Antonio Spurs	West	February	United States
2011-2012	Erik Spoelstra	Miami Heat	East	February	United States
2011-2012	Scott Brooks	Oklahoma City Thunder	West	January	United States
2011-2012	Tom Thibodeau	Chicago Bulls	East	January	United States
2010-2011	Nate McMillan	Portland Trail Blazers	West	April	United States
2010-2011	Tom Thibodeau	Chicago Bulls	East	April	United States
2010-2011	Phil Jackson	Los Angeles Lakers	West	March	United States
2010-2011	Tom Thibodeau	Chicago Bulls	East	March	United States
2010-2011	Rick Carlisle	Dallas Mavericks	West	February	United States
2010-2011	Doug Collins	Philadelphia 76ers	East	February	United States
2010-2011	Monty Williams	New Orleans Hornets	West	January	United States
2010-2011	Tom Thibodeau	Chicago Bulls	East	January	United States
2010-2011	Gregg Popovich	San Antonio Spurs	West	December	United States
2010-2011	Erik Spoelstra	Miami Heat	East	December	United States
2010-2011	Gregg Popovich	San Antonio Spurs	West	November	United States
2010-2011	Doc Rivers	Boston Celtics	East	November	United States
2009-2010	Rick Carlisle	Dallas Mavericks	West	April	United States
2009-2010	Stan Van Gundy	Orlando Magic	East	April	United States
2009-2010	Alvin Gentry	Phoenix Suns	West	March	United States
2009-2010	Erik Spoelstra	Miami Heat	East	March	United States
2009-2010	Scott Brooks	Oklahoma City Thunder	West	February	United States
2009-2010	Scott Skiles	Milwaukee Bucks	East	February	United States
2009-2010	George Karl	Denver Nuggets	West	January	United States
2009-2010	Larry Brown	Charlotte Bobcats	East	January	United States
2009-2010	Lionel Hollins	Memphis Grizzlies	West	December	United States
2009-2010	Mike Brown	Cleveland Cavaliers	East	December	United States
2009-2010	Alvin Gentry	Phoenix Suns	West	November	United States
2009-2010	Stan Van Gundy	Orlando Magic	East	November	United States
2008-2009	Nate McMillan	Portland Trail Blazers	West	April	United States
2008-2009	Doc Rivers	Boston Celtics	East	April	United States
2008-2009	Rick Adelman	Houston Rockets	West	March	United States
2008-2009	Mike Brown	Cleveland Cavaliers	East	March	United States
2008-2009	Jerry Sloan	Utah Jazz	West	February	United States
2008-2009	Mike Brown	Cleveland Cavaliers	East	February	United States
2008-2009	Kevin McHale	Minnesota Timberwolves	West	January	United States
2008-2009	Stan Van Gundy	Orlando Magic	East	January	United States
2008-2009	Byron Scott	New Orleans Hornets	West	December	United States
2008-2009	Mike Brown	Cleveland Cavaliers	East	December	United States
2008-2009	Phil Jackson	Los Angeles Lakers	West	November	United States
2008-2009	Doc Rivers	Boston Celtics	East	November	United States
2007-2008	Phil Jackson	Los Angeles Lakers	West	April	United States
2007-2008	Doc Rivers	Boston Celtics	East	April	United States
2007-2008	Jerry Sloan	Utah Jazz	West	March	United States
2007-2008	Doc Rivers	Boston Celtics	East	March	United States
2007-2008	Rick Adelman	Houston Rockets	West	February	United States
2007-2008	Flip Saunders	Detroit Pistons	East	February	United States
2007-2008	Byron Scott	New Orleans Hornets	West	January	United States
2007-2008	Mike Brown	Cleveland Cavaliers	East	January	United States
2007-2008	Nate McMillan	Portland Trail Blazers	West	December	United States
2007-2008	Flip Saunders	Detroit Pistons	East	December	United States
2007-2008	Gregg Popovich	San Antonio Spurs	West	November	United States
2007-2008	Doc Rivers	Boston Celtics	East	November	United States
2006-2007	Don Nelson	Golden State Warriors	West	April	United States
2006-2007	Lawrence Frank	New Jersey Nets	East	April	United States
2006-2007	Gregg Popovich	San Antonio Spurs	West	March	United States
2006-2007	Pat Riley	Miami Heat	East	March	United States
2006-2007	Avery Johnson	Dallas Mavericks	West	February	United States
2006-2007	Flip Saunders	Detroit Pistons	East	February	United States
2006-2007	Mike D'Antoni	Phoenix Suns	West	January	United States/Italy
2006-2007	Sam Mitchell	Toronto Raptors	East	January	United States
2006-2007	Mike D'Antoni	Phoenix Suns	West	December	United States/Italy
2006-2007	Eddie Jordan	Washington Wizards	East	December	United States
2006-2007	Jerry Sloan	Utah Jazz	West	November	United States
2006-2007	Brian Hill	Orlando Magic	East	November	United States
2005-2006	Mike Fratello	Memphis Grizzlies	West	April	United States
2005-2006	Scott Skiles	Chicago Bulls	East	April	United States
2005-2006	Gregg Popovich	San Antonio Spurs	West	March	United States
2005-2006	Lawrence Frank	New Jersey Nets	East	March	United States
2005-2006	Mike D'Antoni	Phoenix Suns	West	February	United States/Italy
2005-2006	Pat Riley	Miami Heat	East	February	United States
2005-2006	Avery Johnson	Dallas Mavericks	West	January	United States
2005-2006	Flip Saunders	Detroit Pistons	East	January	United States
2005-2006	Gregg Popovich	San Antonio Spurs	West	December	United States
2005-2006	Flip Saunders	Detroit Pistons	East	December	United States
2005-2006	Avery Johnson	Dallas Mavericks	West	November	United States
2005-2006	Flip Saunders	Detroit Pistons	East	November	United States
2004-2005	Avery Johnson	Dallas Mavericks	West	April	United States
2004-2005	Lawrence Frank	New Jersey Nets	East	April	United States
2004-2005	George Karl	Detroit Pistons	West	March	United States
2004-2005	Stan Van Gundy	Miami Heat	East	March	United States
2004-2005	George Karl	Detroit Pistons	West	February	United States
2004-2005	Larry Brown	Detroit Pistons	East	February	United States
2004-2005	Mike Fratello	Memphis Grizzlies	West	January	United States
2004-2005	Scott Skiles	Chicago Bulls	East	January	United States
2004-2005	Mike D'Antoni	Phoenix Suns	West	December	United States/Italy
2004-2005	Stan Van Gundy	Miami Heat	East	December	United States
2004-2005	Nate McMillan	Seattle SuperSonics	West	November	United States
2004-2005	Johnny Davis	Orlando Magic	East	November	United States
2003-2004	Flip Saunders	Minnesota Timberwolves	West	April	United States
2003-2004	Larry Brown	Detroit Pistons	East	April	United States
2003-2004	Hubie Brown	Memphis Grizzlies	West	March	United States
2003-2004	Stan Van Gundy	Miami Heat	East	March	United States
2003-2004	Hubie Brown	Memphis Grizzlies	West	February	United States
2003-2004	Lawrence Frank	New Jersey Nets	East	February	United States
2003-2004	Rick Adelman	Sacramento Kings	West	January	United States
2003-2004	Larry Brown	Detroit Pistons	East	January	United States
2003-2004	Gregg Popovich	San Antonio Spurs	West	December	United States
2003-2004	Byron Scott	New Jersey Nets	East	December	United States
2003-2004	Phil Jackson	Los Angeles Lakers	West	November	United States
2003-2004	Rick Carlisle	Indiana Pacers	East	November	United States
2002-2003	Phil Jackson	Los Angeles Lakers	West	April	United States
2002-2003	Paul Silas	New Orleans Hornets	East	April	United States
2002-2003	Gregg Popovich	San Antonio Spurs	West	March	United States
2002-2003	Larry Brown	Philadelphia 76ers	East	March	United States
2002-2003	Flip Saunders	Minnesota Timberwolves	West	February	United States
2002-2003	Larry Brown	Philadelphia 76ers	East	February	United States
2002-2003	Gregg Popovich	San Antonio Spurs	West	January	United States
2002-2003	George Karl	Milwaukee Bucks	East	January	United States
2002-2003	Frank Johnson	Phoenix Suns	West	December	United States
2002-2003	Byron Scott	New Jersey Nets	East	December	United States
2002-2003	Don Nelson	Dallas Mavericks	West	November	United States
2002-2003	Isiah Thomas	Indiana Pacers	East	November	United States
2001-2002	Lenny Wilkens	Toronto Raptors	East	April	United States
2001-2002	Gregg Popovich	San Antonio Spurs	West	March	United States
2001-2002	Rick Carlisle	Detroit Pistons	East	February	United States
2001-2002	Rick Adelman	Sacramento Kings	West	January	United States
2001-2002	Doug Collins	Washington Wizards	East	December	United States
2001-2002	Larry Brown	Philadelphia 76ers	East	November	United States
2000-2001	Isiah Thomas	Indiana Pacers	East	April	United States
2000-2001	Gregg Popovich	San Antonio Spurs	West	March	United States
2000-2001	Jerry Sloan	Utah Jazz	West	February	United States
2000-2001	Flip Saunders	Minnesota Timberwolves	West	January	United States
2000-2001	Pat Riley	Miami Heat	East	December	United States
2000-2001	Larry Brown	Philadelphia 76ers	East	November	United States
1999-2000	Paul Silas	Charlotte Hornets	East	April	United States
1999-2000	Jerry Sloan	Utah Jazz	West	March	United States
1999-2000	Phil Jackson	Los Angeles Lakers	West	February	United States
1999-2000	Flip Saunders	Minnesota Timberwolves	West	January	United States
1999-2000	Phil Jackson	Los Angeles Lakers	West	December	United States
1999-2000	Mike Dunleavy	Portland Trail Blazers	West	November	United States
1998-1999	Gregg Popovich	San Antonio Spurs	West	April	United States
1998-1999	Mike Dunleavy	Portland Trail Blazers	West	March	United States
1998-1999	Jerry Sloan	Utah Jazz	West	February	United States
1997-1998	Del Harris	Los Angeles Lakers	West	April	United States
1997-1998	Jerry Sloan	Utah Jazz	West	March	United States
1997-1998	Pat Riley	Miami Heat	East	February	United States
1997-1998	Larry Bird	Indiana Pacers	East	January	United States
1997-1998	George Karl	Seattle SuperSonics	West	December	United States
1997-1998	Lenny Wilkens	Atlanta Hawks	East	November	United States
1996-1997	Dave Cowens	Charlotte Hornets	East	April	United States
1996-1997	Jerry Sloan	Utah Jazz	West	March	United States
1996-1997	Doug Collins	Detroit Pistons	East	February	United States
1996-1997	Lenny Wilkens	Atlanta Hawks	East	January	United States
1996-1997	Pat Riley	Miami Heat	East	December	United States
1996-1997	Rudy Tomjanovich	Houston Rockets	West	November	United States
1995-1996	Phil Jackson	Chicago Bulls	East	April	United States
1995-1996	Bob Hill	San Antonio Spurs	West	March	United States
1995-1996	George Karl	Seattle SuperSonics	West	February	United States
1995-1996	Phil Jackson	Chicago Bulls	East	January	United States
1995-1996	Mike Fratello	Cleveland Cavaliers	East	December	United States
1995-1996	Garry St. Jean	Sacramento Kings	West	November	United States
1994-1995	Bob Hill	San Antonio Spurs	West	April	United States
1994-1995	Bernie Bickerstaff	Denver Nuggets	West	March	United States
1994-1995	Bob Hill	San Antonio Spurs	West	February	United States
1994-1995	Jerry Sloan	Utah Jazz	West	January	United States
1994-1995	Mike Fratello	Cleveland Cavaliers	East	December	United States
1994-1995	Dick Motta	Dallas Mavericks	West	November	United States
1993-1994	George Karl	Seattle SuperSonics	West	April	United States
1993-1994	Pat Riley	New York Knicks	East	March	United States
1993-1994	Larry Brown	Indiana Pacers	East	February	United States
1993-1994	Phil Jackson	Chicago Bulls	East	January	United States
1993-1994	Jerry Sloan	Utah Jazz	West	December	United States
1993-1994	Rudy Tomjanovich	Houston Rockets	West	November	United States
1992-1993	Rudy Tomjanovich	Houston Rockets	West	April	United States
1992-1993	Bob Weiss	Atlanta Hawks	East	March	United States
1992-1993	Lenny Wilkens	Cleveland Cavaliers	East	February	United States
1992-1993	John Lucas	San Antonio Spurs	West	January	United States
1992-1993	Paul Westphal	Phoenix Suns	West	December	United States
1992-1993	Mike Dunleavy	Los Angeles Lakers	West	November	United States
1991-1992	Chris Ford	Boston Celtics	East	April	United States
1991-1992	Larry Brown	Los Angeles Clippers	West	March	United States
1991-1992	George Karl	Seattle SuperSonics	West	February	United States
1991-1992	Phil Jackson	Chicago Bulls	East	January	United States
1991-1992	Cotton Fitzsimmons	Phoenix Suns	West	December	United States
1991-1992	Mike Dunleavy	Los Angeles Lakers	West	November	United States
1990-1991	Rick Adelman	Portland Trail Blazers	West	April	United States
1990-1991	Don Chaney	Houston Rockets	West	March	United States
1990-1991	Don Chaney	Houston Rockets	West	February	United States
1990-1991	Mike Dunleavy	Los Angeles Lakers	West	January	United States
1990-1991	Bob Weiss	Atlanta Hawks	East	December	United States
1990-1991	Rick Adelman	Portland Trail Blazers	West	November	United States
1989-1990	Jimmy Rodgers	Boston Celtics	East	April	United States
1989-1990	Rick Adelman	Portland Trail Blazers	West	March	United States
1989-1990	Cotton Fitzsimmons	Phoenix Suns	West	February	United States
1989-1990	Jim Lynam	Philadelphia 76ers	East	January	United States
1989-1990	Stu Jackson	New York Knicks	East	December	United States
1989-1990	Dick Versace	Indiana Pacers	East	November	United States
1988-1989	Cotton Fitzsimmons	Phoenix Suns	West	April	United States
1988-1989	Chuck Daly	Detroit Pistons	East	March	United States
1988-1989	Don Nelson	Golden State Warriors	West	February	United States
1988-1989	Del Harris	Milwaukee Bucks	East	January	United States
1988-1989	Lenny Wilkens	Cleveland Cavaliers	East	December	United States
1988-1989	Chuck Daly	Detroit Pistons	East	November	United States
1987-1988	Lenny Wilkens	Cleveland Cavaliers	East	April	United States
1987-1988	Doug Moe	Denver Nuggets	West	March	United States
1987-1988	Pat Riley	Los Angeles Lakers	West	February	United States
1987-1988	Wes Unseld	Washington Bullets	East	January	United States
1987-1988	Chuck Daly	Detroit Pistons	East	December	United States
1987-1988	Doug Collins	Chicago Bulls	East	November	United States
1986-1987	George Karl	Golden State Warriors	West	March	United States
1986-1987	Mike Schuler	Portland Trail Blazers	West	February	United States
1986-1987	Bill Fitch	Houston Rockets	West	January	United States
1986-1987	Frank Layden	Utah Jazz	West	December	United States
1986-1987	Pat Riley	Los Angeles Lakers	West	November	United States
1985-1986	K.C. Jones	Boston Celtics	East	March	United States
1985-1986	Chuck Daly	Detroit Pistons	East	February	United States
1985-1986	Mike Fratello	Atlanta Hawks	East	January	United States
1985-1986	Cotton Fitzsimmons	San Antonio Spurs	West	December	United States
1985-1986	Pat Riley	Los Angeles Lakers	West	November	United States
1984-1985	Pat Riley	Los Angeles Lakers	West	March	United States
1984-1985	George Karl	Cleveland Cavaliers	East	February	United States
1984-1985	Chuck Daly	Detroit Pistons	East	January	United States
1984-1985	Don Nelson	Milwaukee Bucks	East	December	United States
1984-1985	Doug Moe	Denver Nuggets	West	November	United States
1983-1984	Jack Ramsay	Portland Trail Blazers	West	March	United States
1983-1984	Chuck Daly	Detroit Pistons	East	February	United States
1983-1984	K.C. Jones	Boston Celtics	East	January	United States
1983-1984	Frank Layden	Utah Jazz	West	December	United States
1983-1984	Dick Motta	Dallas Mavericks	West	November	United States
1982-1983	Stan Albeck	San Antonio Spurs	West	March	United States
1982-1983	Hubie Brown	New York Knicks	East	February	United States
1982-1983	Pat Riley	Los Angeles Lakers	West	January	United States
1982-1983	Billy Cunningham	Philadelphia 76ers	East	December	United States
1982-1983	Scotty Robertson	Detroit Pistons	East	November	United States
