= Jason Pociask =

American football player (born 1983)

No. 82, 80
- Position: Tight end

Personal information
- Born: February 9, 1983 (age 43); Indianapolis, Indiana, U.S.
- Listed height: 6 ft 3 in (1.91 m)
- Listed weight: 259 lb (117 kg)

Career information
- High school: Plainfield (Plainfield, Indiana)
- College: Wisconsin (2001–2005)
- NFL draft: 2006: 5th round, 150th overall pick

Career history
- New York Jets (2006–2007); New England Patriots (2008)*; Tampa Bay Buccaneers (2008-2009)*; Indianapolis Colts (2009)*; Carolina Panthers (2009)*; Seattle Seahawks (2009-2010)*; Florida Tuskers (2010); Dallas Cowboys (2010–2011)*
- * Offseason or practice squad member only

Career NFL statistics
- Receptions: 1
- Receiving yards: 7
- Stats at Pro Football Reference

Jason Pociask (/ˈpoʊzi.æk/; born February 9, 1983) is an American former professional football player who was a tight end in the National Football League (NFL) for the New York Jets, New England Patriots, Tampa Bay Buccaneers, Indianapolis Colts, Carolina Panthers, Seattle Seahawks and Dallas Cowboys. He was selected by the New York Jets in the fifth round of the 2006 NFL draft. He also was a member of the Florida Tuskers in the United Football League (UFL). He played college football for the Wisconsin Badgers.

== Early life ==
Pociask attended Plainfield High School in Plainfield, Indiana. As a senior, he tallied 47 receptions for 721 yards and 128 tackles. He contributed to a 14–1 record and an appearance in the state finals. He received Associated Press All-state and 4A Defensive Player of the Year honors.

== College career ==
Pociask accepted a football scholarship from the University of Wisconsin. As a redshirt freshman, he appeared in 5 games as a backup tight end and playing on special teams.

As a sophomore he appeared in 13 games (5 starts), collecting one reception for 5 yards. As a junior, he appeared in 11 contests (4 starts), making 4 receptions for 60 yards.

As a senior, he started 12 games, posting 7 receptions for 79 yards. He finished his college career with 41 games (21 starts) and 12 receptions for 144 yards.

== Professional career ==
Pre-draft measurables
Height	Weight	Arm length	Hand span	40-yard dash	10-yard split	20-yard split	20-yard shuttle	Three-cone drill	Vertical jump	Broad jump	Bench press
6 ft 3 in (1.91 m)	266 lb (121 kg)	32 3/8 in (0.82 m)	9 5/8 in (0.24 m)	4.84 s	1.71 s	2.86 s	4.30 s	7.31 s	32.5 in (0.83 m)	9 ft 7 in (2.92 m)	23 reps
All values from NFL Combine

=== New York Jets ===
Pociask was selected by the New York Jets in the fifth round (150th overall) of the 2006 NFL draft. On August 5, 2006, he was placed on the injured reserve list with a season ending shoulder injury. In 2007, he appeared in 4 games as a backup tight end, making one reception for 7 yards. He was released on August 30, 2008.

=== New England Patriots ===
On September 1, 2008, he was claimed off waivers by the New England Patriots. He was released three days later on September 4.

=== Tampa Bay Buccaneers ===
On October 27, 2008, he was signed to the Tampa Bay Buccaneers practice squad. He was promoted to the active roster on December 30. He was released on September 5, 2009.

=== Indianapolis Colts ===
On September 8, 2009, he was signed to the Indianapolis Colts practice squad. He was released on September 12. He was re-signed on September 16. He was released on September 17.

=== Carolina Panthers ===
On October 27, 2009, he was signed to the Carolina Panthers practice squad. He was released on November 17.

=== Seattle Seahawks ===
On December 31, 2009, he was signed to the Seattle Seahawks practice squad. On January 5, 2010, he was promoted to the active roster for the playoffs. He was released on May 17, 2010.

=== Florida Tuskers ===
On July 21, 2010, he signed with the Florida Tuskers of the United Football League. He registered 12 receptions for 153 yards in 9 games (6 starts). He also contributed to the team winning the UFL Championship.

=== Dallas Cowboys ===
On August 15, 2010, he was signed as a free agent by the Dallas Cowboys. He spent the final few weeks of training camp with the team before being released on September 3. He was signed to the practice squad on December 8.
