= Thomas B. Harvey =

American physician (1827–1889)

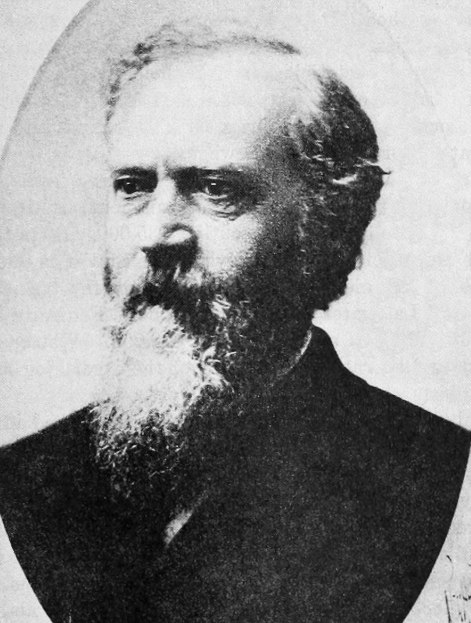
- Born: November 29, 1827; Clinton County, Ohio, US
- Died: December 5, 1889 (aged 62); Indianapolis, Indiana, US
- Occupation: Physician
- Spouse: Delitha Butler
- Children: Lawson Harvey

Thomas B. Harvey (November 29, 1827 – December 5, 1889) was a medical doctor who served as the examining surgeon for Union soldiers in Indianapolis during the American Civil War.

== Education and career ==
Born in Clinton County, Ohio, his father was a physician and teacher, and his education began in his father's school at Harveysburg, in Warren County, Ohio. In 1846 be began the study of medicine, and two years later graduated from the Medical College of Ohio at Cincinnati. He moved to Plainfield, Indiana, and built up a large private practice in Indianapolis. In 1862, during the American Civil War, he was appointed by President Abraham Lincoln to be the examining surgeon for Union soldiers in Indianapolis.

When the Indiana Medical College was organized in Indianapolis in 1869, he became a professor of children's and women's health, and in 1880, he was elected president of the state medical association.

== Personal life ==
Harvey married Delitha Butler, originally from Liberty, Indiana, who was noted for her involvement in many philanthropic organizations. Their son, Lawson Harvey, served as a justice of the Indiana Supreme Court; another son, Frank, drowned while skating at Harvard College.

On the afternoon of December 5, 1827, Harvey was lecturing on the effects of blood clots when he collapsed in the lecture room. He tried to continue the lecture, but lapsed into unconsciousness, and died at his home later that evening, at the age of 62.
