= NBA Coach of the Year =

National Basketball Association award

- Sport: Basketball
- League: National Basketball Association
- Awarded for: Coach deemed most integral to their team's success in regular season of the National Basketball Association

History
- First award: 1962–63
- Most wins: Don Nelson; Pat Riley; Gregg Popovich (tied, 3)
- Most recent: Joe Mazzulla, Boston Celtics (2026)

The National Basketball Association's Coach of the Year is an annual National Basketball Association (NBA) award given since the 1962–63 NBA season. The winner receives the Red Auerbach Trophy, which is named in honor of the head coach who led the Boston Celtics to nine NBA championships from 1956 to 1966. The winner is selected at the end of the regular season by a panel of sportswriters from the United States and Canada, each of whom casts a vote for first, second and third place selections. Each first-place vote is worth five points; each second-place vote is worth three points; and each third-place vote is worth one point. The person with the highest point total, regardless of the number of first-place votes, wins the award.

Since its inception, the award has been given to 41 different coaches. The most recent award winner is current Boston Celtics head coach Joe Mazzulla. Gregg Popovich, Don Nelson and Pat Riley have each won the award three times, while Hubie Brown, Mike Brown, Mike Budenholzer, Mike D'Antoni, Bill Fitch, Cotton Fitzsimmons, Gene Shue, and Tom Thibodeau have each won it twice. No coach has won consecutive Coach of the Year awards. Riley is the only coach to be named Coach of the Year with three franchises. Tom Heinsohn, Bill Sharman, and Lenny Wilkens are the only recipients to have been inducted to the Naismith Memorial Basketball Hall of Fame as both player and coach. Johnny Kerr is the only person to win the award with a losing record (33–48 with the Chicago Bulls in 1966–67). Kerr was honored because he had guided the Bulls to the NBA Playoffs in their first season in the league. Doc Rivers is the only person to win the award despite his team not making the playoffs (41–41 with the Orlando Magic in 1999–2000). Only five recipients also coached the team that won the championship the same season: Red Auerbach, Red Holzman, Bill Sharman, Phil Jackson, and Gregg Popovich. Popovich is the only NBA Coach of the Year recipient to win the championship in the same season twice, winning the NBA title with the San Antonio Spurs in 2003 and 2014. 2020 winner and former Toronto Raptors head coach Nick Nurse is the only coach to receive this honor in both the NBA and the NBA G League, having received the G League award in 2011.

2015–16 recipient Steve Kerr only coached 39 of the 82 games in the season due to complications from offseason back surgery, though he received credit for all of the Golden State Warriors' 73 wins that season. Assistant coach Luke Walton served as interim head coach for the other 43 games for the Warriors, receiving one second-place vote and two third-place votes. Steve Kerr and Luke Walton both won NBA Coach of the Month during the 2015–16 season, Kerr in March and Walton in November. Kerr asked the league to award Walton with the wins accumulated during Kerr's medical recovery time, but the NBA refused to do so because under league rules interim head coaches do not have win-loss records at all. Mike Brown became the first unanimous Coach of the Year recipient in NBA history in the 2022–23 season.

== Winners ==
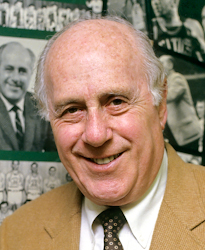
Hall of Famer Red Auerbach won the award in the 1964–65 season. The award was later named after him.

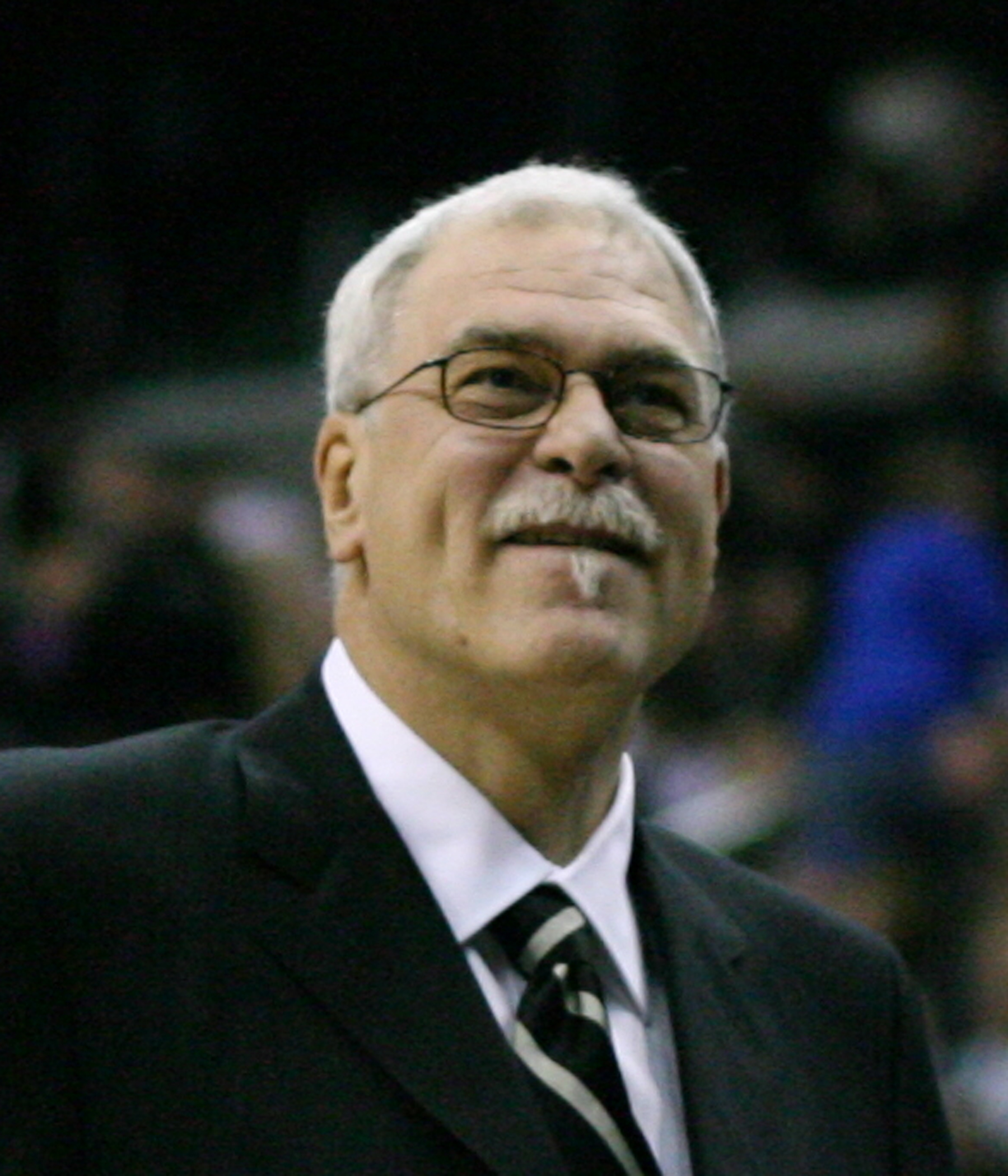
Hall of Famer Phil Jackson won the award in the 1995–96 season, coaching the Chicago Bulls to 72 wins in a season.

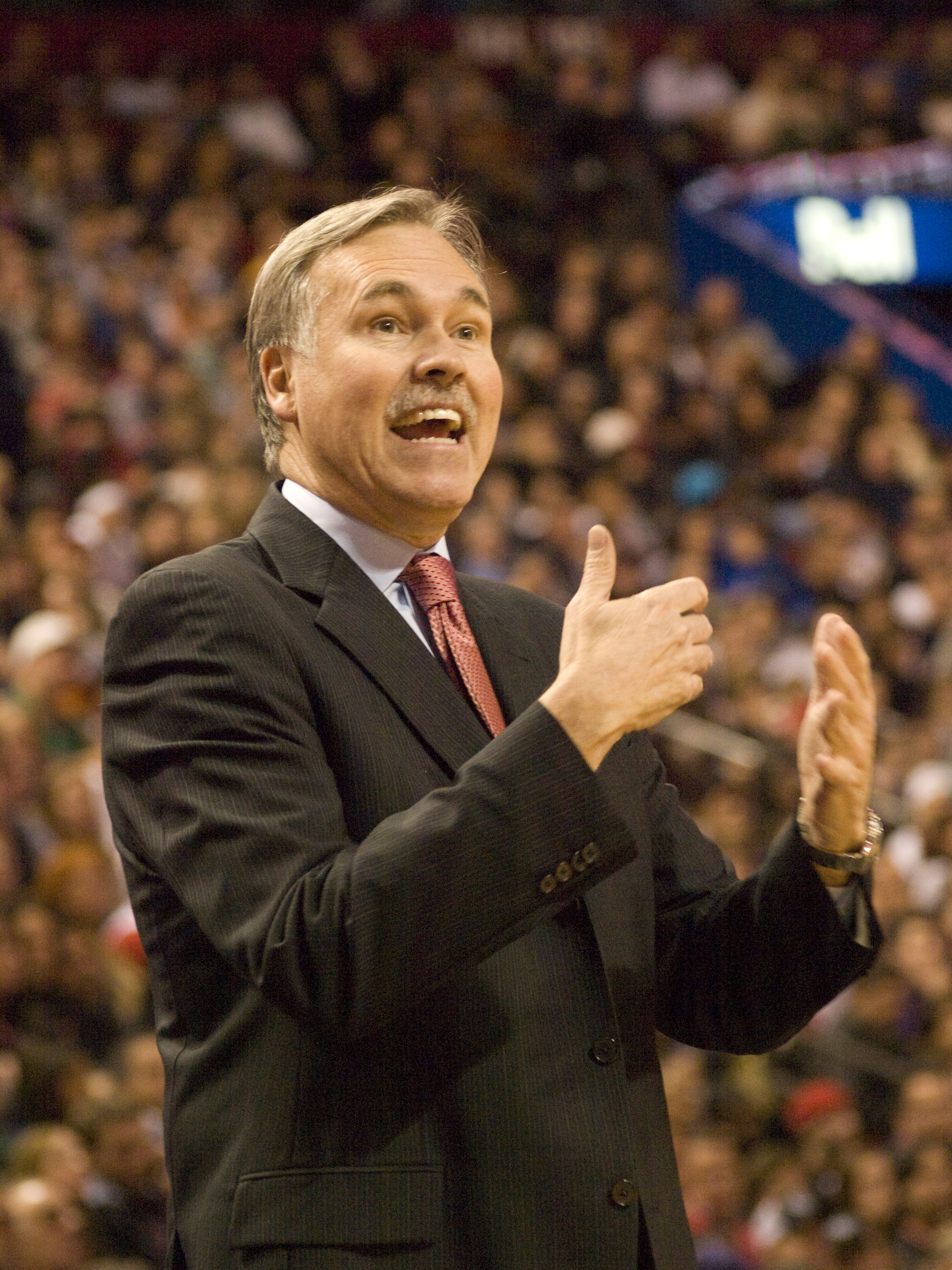
Mike D'Antoni led the 2004–05 Phoenix Suns to a 33-win increase from the previous season.

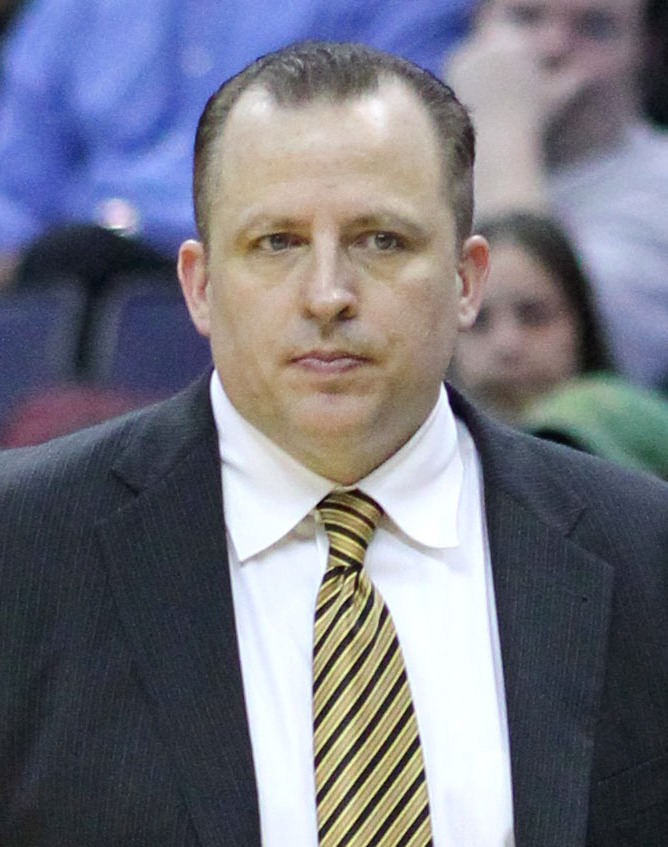
Chicago Bulls and New York Knicks head coach Tom Thibodeau won the award in the 2010–11 and 2020–21 seasons.

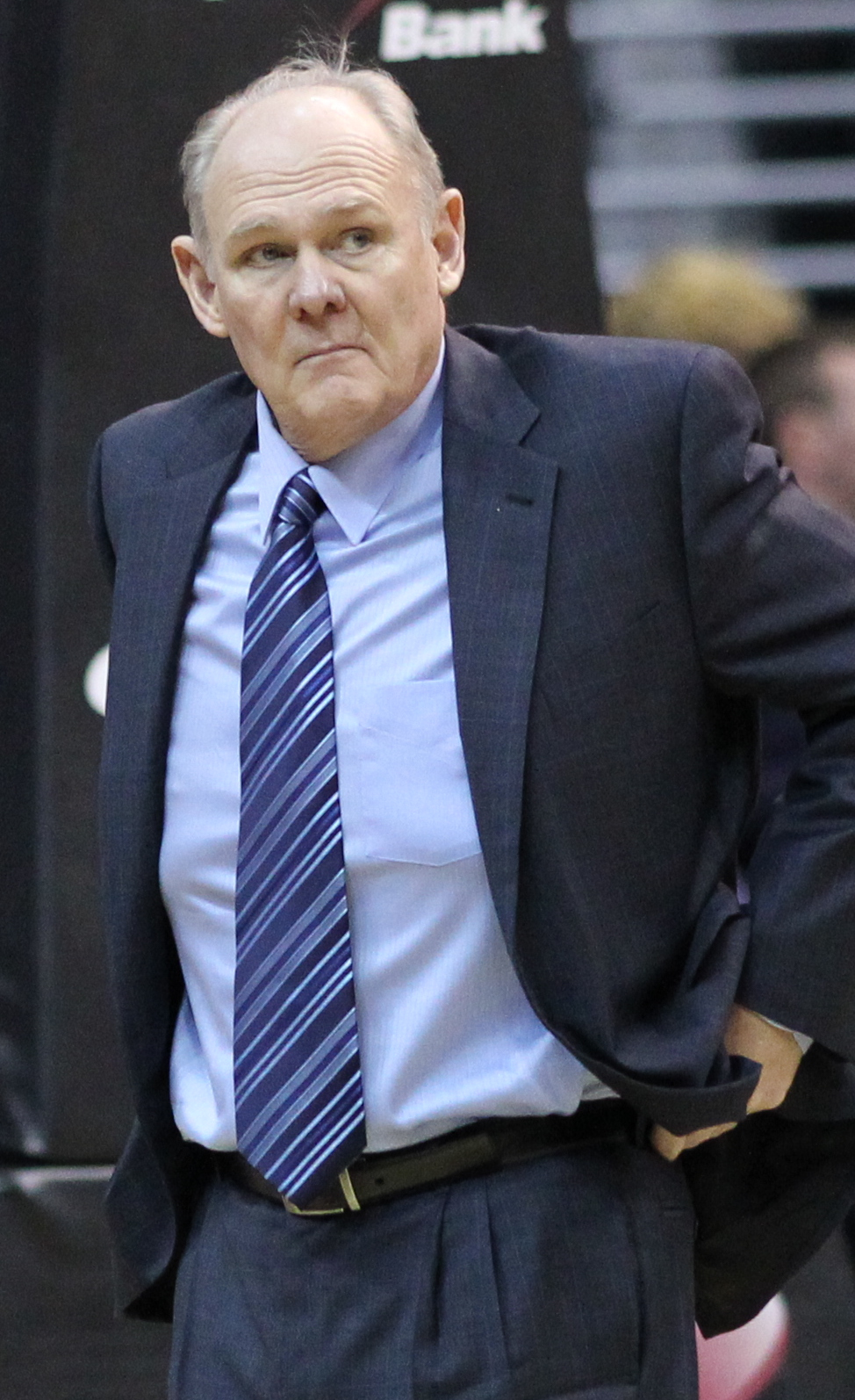
George Karl led the 2012–13 Denver Nuggets to a 57–25 record without an NBA All-Star.

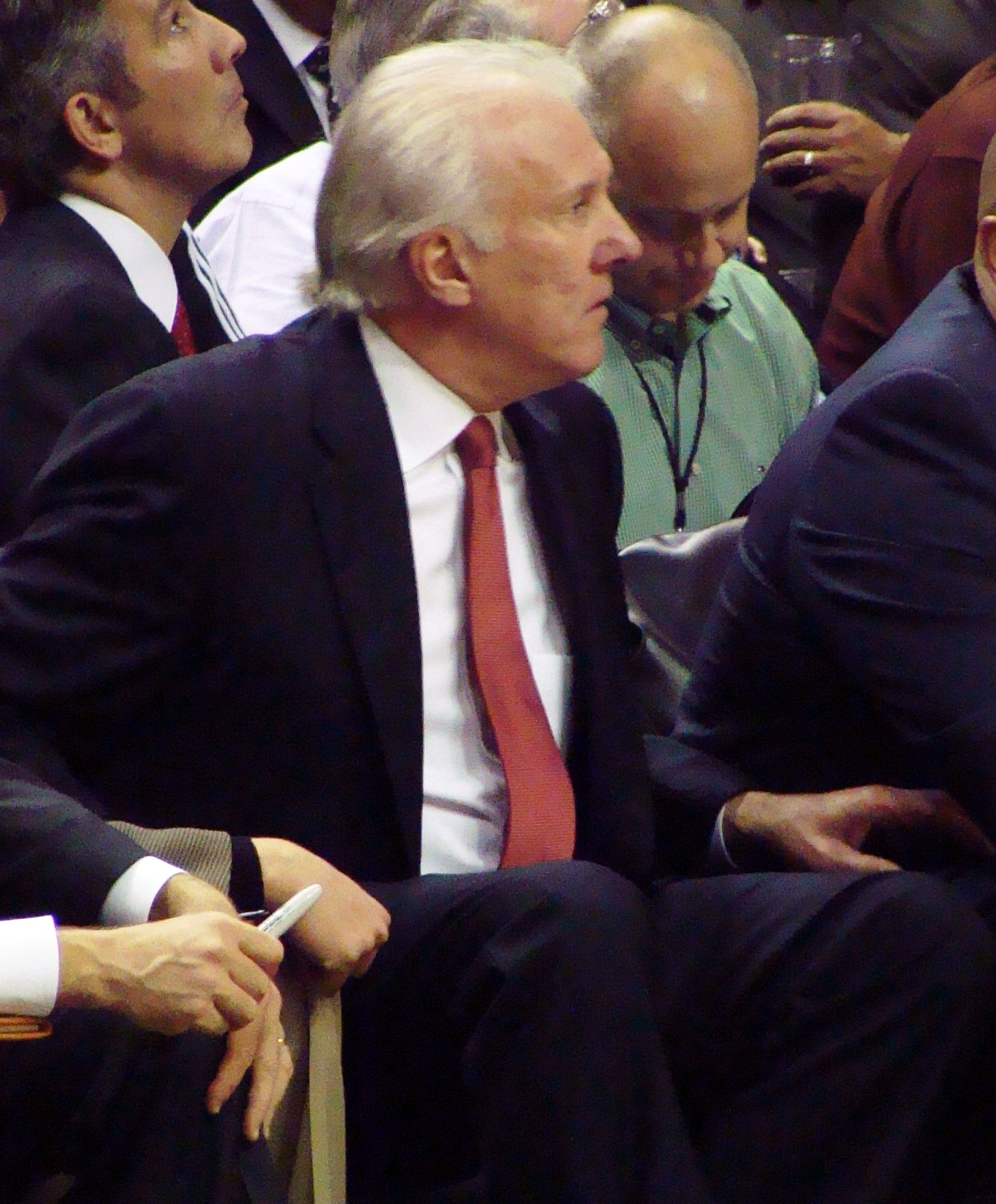
Gregg Popovich led the 2013–14 San Antonio Spurs to their 5th NBA championship, and earned his 3rd NBA Coach of the Year Award that same season.

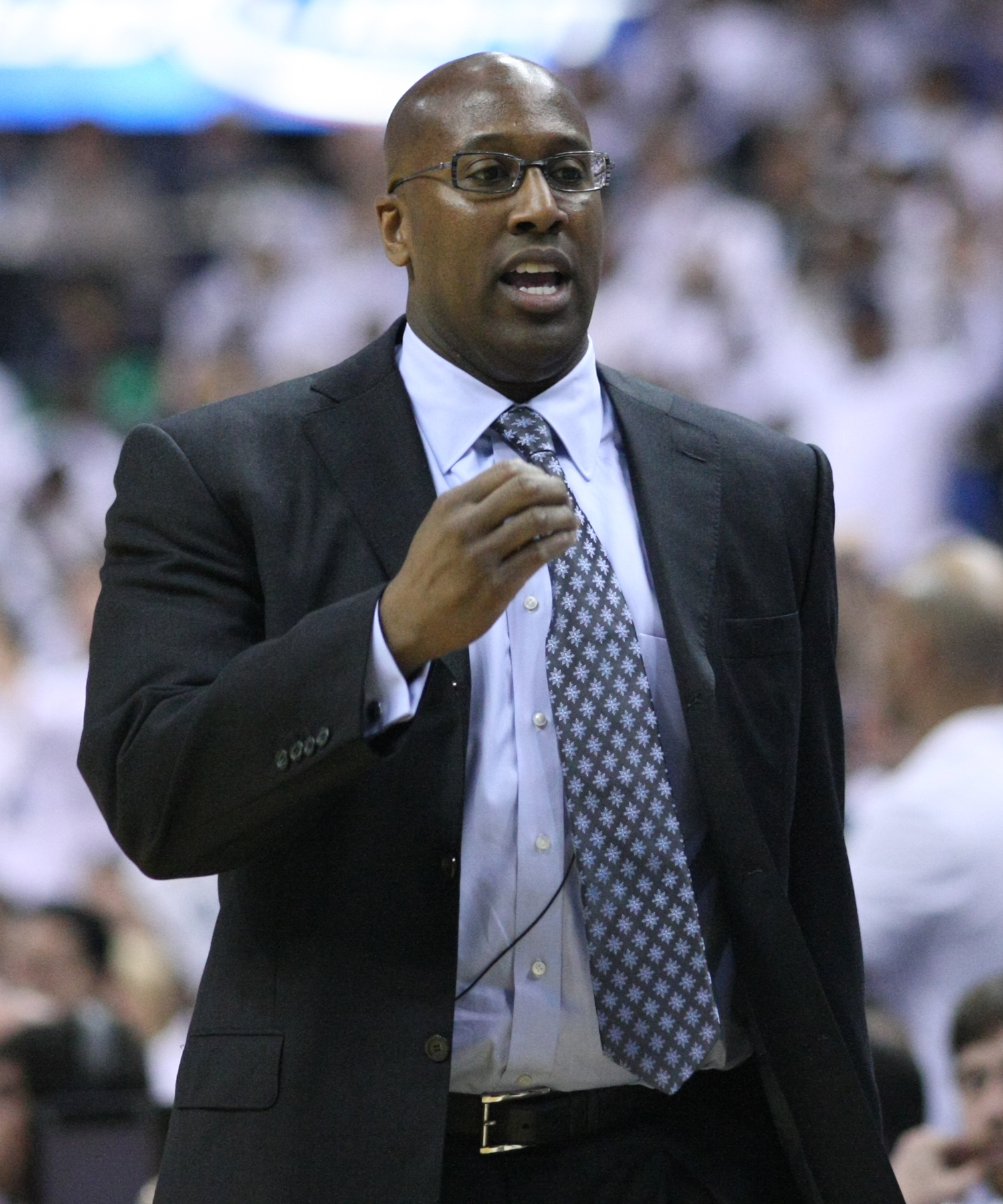
Mike Brown won the award unanimously in the 2022–23 season. He remains the only coach in NBA history to have achieved that feat.

^	Denotes head coach who is currently active in the NBA as a head coach
*	Elected to the Naismith Memorial Basketball Hall of Fame as a coach
†	Denotes coach was a unanimous winner
**Bold**	Team won NBA championship for that season
Coach (#)	Denotes the number of times the coach has been selected
Team (#)	Denotes the number of times a coach from this team has won
W–L	Win–loss record for that season
Win%	Winning percentage for that season
Win% ±	Winning percentage change from previous season

Season	Coach	Nationality	Team	W–L	Win%	Win% ±
1962–63	Harry Gallatin	United States	St. Louis Hawks	48–32	.600	+.237
1963–64	Alex Hannum*	United States	San Francisco Warriors	48–32	.600	+.212
1964–65	Red Auerbach* (Note: Was selected as one of the Top 10 Coaches in NBA History)	United States	**Boston Celtics**	62–18	.775	+.037
1965–66	Dolph Schayes	United States	Philadelphia 76ers	55–25	.688	+.188
1966–67	Johnny Kerr	United States	Chicago Bulls	33–48	.407	–
1967–68	Richie Guerin	United States	St. Louis Hawks (2)	56–26	.683	+.202
1968–69	Gene Shue	United States	Baltimore Bullets	57–25	.695	+.256
1969–70	Red Holzman*	United States	**New York Knicks**	60–22	.732	+.073
1970–71	Dick Motta	United States	Chicago Bulls (2)	51–31	.622	+.146
1971–72	Bill Sharman*	United States	**Los Angeles Lakers**	69–13	.841	+.256
1972–73	Tom Heinsohn*	United States	Boston Celtics (2)	68–14	.829	+.146
1973–74	Ray Scott	United States	Detroit Pistons	52–30	.634	+.146
1974–75	Phil Johnson	United States	Kansas City–Omaha Kings	44–38	.537	+.135
1975–76	Bill Fitch*	United States	Cleveland Cavaliers	49–33	.598	+.110
1976–77	Tom Nissalke	United States	Houston Rockets	49–33	.598	+.110
1977–78	Hubie Brown	United States	Atlanta Hawks (3)	41–41	.500	+.122
1978–79	Cotton Fitzsimmons*	United States	Kansas City Kings (2)	48–34	.585	+.207
1979–80	Bill Fitch* (2)	United States	Boston Celtics (3)	61–21	.744	+.390
1980–81	Jack McKinney	United States	Indiana Pacers	44–38	.537	+.086
1981–82	Gene Shue (2)	United States	Washington Bullets (2)	43–39	.524	+.048
1982–83	Don Nelson*	United States	Milwaukee Bucks	51–31	.622	-.049
1983–84	Frank Layden	United States	Utah Jazz	45–37	.549	+.183
1984–85	Don Nelson* (2)	United States	Milwaukee Bucks (2)	59–23	.720	+.110
1985–86	Mike Fratello	United States	Atlanta Hawks (4)	50–32	.610	+.195
1986–87	Mike Schuler	United States	Portland Trail Blazers	49–33	.598	+.110
1987–88	Doug Moe	United States	Denver Nuggets	54–28	.659	+.208
1988–89	Cotton Fitzsimmons* (2)	United States	Phoenix Suns	55–27	.671	+.330
1989–90	Pat Riley*	United States	Los Angeles Lakers (2)	63–19	.768	+.073
1990–91	Don Chaney	United States	Houston Rockets (2)	52–30	.634	+.134
1991–92	Don Nelson* (3)	United States	Golden State Warriors (2)	55–27	.671	+.134
1992–93	Pat Riley* (2)	United States	New York Knicks (2)	60–22	.732	+.110
1993–94	Lenny Wilkens*	United States	Atlanta Hawks (5)	57–25	.695	+.171
1994–95	Del Harris	United States	Los Angeles Lakers (3)	48–34	.585	+.183
1995–96	Phil Jackson*	United States	**Chicago Bulls** (3)	72–10	.878	+.305
1996–97	Pat Riley* (3)	United States	Miami Heat	61–21	.744	+.232
1997–98	Larry Bird	United States	Indiana Pacers (2)	58–24	.707	+.231
1998–99	Mike Dunleavy	United States	Portland Trail Blazers (2)	35–15	.700	+.139
1999–00	Doc Rivers*	United States	Orlando Magic	41–41	.500	-.160
2000–01	Larry Brown*	United States	Philadelphia 76ers (2)	56–26	.683	+.085
2001–02	Rick Carlisle^	United States	Detroit Pistons (2)	50–32	.610	+.220
2002–03	Gregg Popovich*	United States	**San Antonio Spurs**	60–22	.732	+.025
2003–04	Hubie Brown (2)	United States	Memphis Grizzlies	50–32	.610	+.269
2004–05	Mike D'Antoni	United States; Italy (Note: D'Antoni also holds Italian citizenship and has represented Italy at international level.)	Phoenix Suns (2)	62–20	.756	+.402
2005–06	Avery Johnson	United States	Dallas Mavericks	60–22	.732	+.025
2006–07	Sam Mitchell	United States	Toronto Raptors	47–35	.573	+.244
2007–08	Byron Scott	United States	New Orleans Hornets	56–26	.683	+.207
2008–09	Mike Brown^	United States	Cleveland Cavaliers (2)	66–16	.805	+.256
2009–10	Scott Brooks	United States	Oklahoma City Thunder	50–32	.610	+.330
2010–11	Tom Thibodeau	United States	Chicago Bulls (4)	62–20	.756	+.256
2011–12	Gregg Popovich* (2)	United States	San Antonio Spurs (2)	50–16	.758	+.014
2012–13	George Karl*	United States	Denver Nuggets (2)	57–25	.695	+.119
2013–14	Gregg Popovich* (3)	United States	**San Antonio Spurs** (3)	62–20	.756	+.049
2014–15	Mike Budenholzer	United States	Atlanta Hawks (6)	60–22	.732	+.269
2015–16	Steve Kerr^	United States	Golden State Warriors (3)	73–9	.890	+.073
2016–17	Mike D'Antoni (2)	United States; Italy	Houston Rockets (3)	55–27	.671	+.171
2017–18	Dwane Casey	United States	Toronto Raptors (2)	59–23	.720	+.098
2018–19	Mike Budenholzer (2)	United States	Milwaukee Bucks (3)	60–22	.732	+.195
2019–20	Nick Nurse^	United States	Toronto Raptors (3)	46–18 (Note: Record reflects games played before the NBA suspended its 2019–20 season due to the COVID-19 pandemic. Before the season resumed on July 30, 2020, the NBA announced that voting for that season's awards would be based solely on games played before the season was halted.)	.719	+.012
2020–21	Tom Thibodeau (2)	United States	New York Knicks (3)	41–31	.569	+.251
2021–22	Monty Williams	United States	Phoenix Suns (3)	64–18	.780	+.072
2022–23	Mike Brown^† (2)	United States	Sacramento Kings (3)	48–34	.585	+.219
2023–24	Mark Daigneault^	United States	Oklahoma City Thunder (2)	57–25	.695	+.207
2024–25	Kenny Atkinson^	United States	Cleveland Cavaliers (3)	64–18	.780	+.195
2025–26	Joe Mazzulla^	United States	Boston Celtics (4)	56–26	.683	-.061

== Multi-time winners ==
Awards	Coach	Team(s)	Years
3	(United States) Don Nelson	Milwaukee Bucks (2), Golden State Warriors (1)	1983, 1985, 1992
3	(United States) Pat Riley	Los Angeles Lakers (1), New York Knicks (1), Miami Heat (1)	1990, 1993, 1997
3	(United States) Gregg Popovich	San Antonio Spurs	2003, 2012, 2014
2	(United States) Gene Shue	Baltimore Bullets (1), Washington Bullets (1)	1969, 1982
2	(United States) Bill Fitch	Cleveland Cavaliers (1), Boston Celtics (1)	1976, 1980
2	(United States) Hubie Brown	Atlanta Hawks (1), Memphis Grizzlies (1)	1978, 2004
2	(United States) Cotton Fitzsimmons	Kansas City Kings (1), Phoenix Suns (1)	1979, 1989
2	(United States) Mike D'Antoni	Phoenix Suns (1), Houston Rockets (1)	2005, 2017
2	(United States) Mike Budenholzer	Atlanta Hawks (1), Milwaukee Bucks (1)	2015, 2019
2	(United States) Tom Thibodeau	Chicago Bulls (1), New York Knicks (1)	2011, 2021
2	(United States) Mike Brown	Cleveland Cavaliers (1), Sacramento Kings (1)	2009, 2023

== Teams ==
Awards	Teams	Years
6	Atlanta Hawks / St. Louis Hawks	1963, 1968, 1978, 1986, 1994, 2015
4	Boston Celtics	1965, 1973, 1980, 2026
4	Chicago Bulls	1967, 1971, 1996, 2011
3
3	Cleveland Cavaliers	1976, 2009, 2025
3	Golden State Warriors	1964, 1992, 2016
3	Houston Rockets	1977, 1991, 2017
3	Los Angeles Lakers	1972, 1990, 1995
3	Milwaukee Bucks	1983, 1985, 2019
3	New York Knicks	1970, 1993, 2021
3	Phoenix Suns	1989, 2005, 2022
3	Sacramento Kings / Kansas City–Omaha Kings	1975, 1979, 2023
3	San Antonio Spurs	2003, 2012, 2014
3	Toronto Raptors	2007, 2018, 2020
2	Denver Nuggets	1988, 2013
2	Detroit Pistons	1974, 2002
2	Indiana Pacers	1981, 1998
2	Oklahoma City Thunder	2010, 2024
2	Philadelphia 76ers	1966, 2001
2	Portland Trail Blazers	1987, 1999
2	Washington Wizards / Baltimore Bullets / Washington Bullets	1969, 1982
1	Dallas Mavericks	2006
1	Memphis Grizzlies	2004
1	Miami Heat	1997
1	New Orleans Pelicans / New Orleans Hornets	2008
1	Orlando Magic	2000
1	Utah Jazz	1984
0	Brooklyn Nets	None
0	Los Angeles Clippers	None
0	Minnesota Timberwolves	None

== See also ==
- List of NBA awards
- NBA records
- NBCA Coach of the Year Award, awarded by NBA coaches' union
- NBL (United States) Coach of the Year Award
