= Plainfield Community School Corporation =

School district in Indiana, US

Coordinates: 39°41′39.7″N 86°23′43.5″W

Plainfield Community School Corporation (PCSC) is a school district headquartered in Plainfield, Indiana.

The district is coextensive with Guilford Township and includes the vast majority of Plainfield.

== Schools ==
Secondary:

- Plainfield High School
- Plainfield Community Middle School

Elementary:

- Brentwood Elementary
- Central Elementary
- Clarks Creek Elementary
- Van Buren Elementary
- Guilford Elementary

Preschool:

- Little Quakers Academy Preschool

Source: Indiana Department of Education
