= Ron McQueeney =

American sports photographer

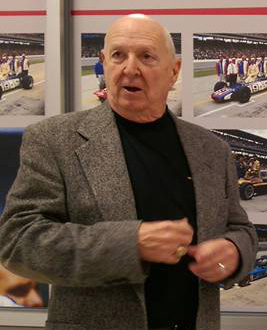
Ron McQueeney speaking at the Indianapolis Motor Speedway Hall of Fame Museum in 2015

Ron McQueeney was an American sports photographer. He served as Director of Photography at the Indianapolis Motor Speedway starting in 1977 until his retirement in 2011.

== Early life and education ==
Ron McQueeney was born in Denver, Colorado. He was raised in Plainfield, Indiana.

== Career ==
McQueeney started working at the Indianapolis Motor Speedway (IMS) as a part-time photographer in 1972. He became Director of Photography at the IMS in 1977. Until his retirement, he annually photographed the Indianapolis 500, Brickyard 400, the United States Grand Prix (when it was in Indianapolis), and the MotoGP. He also managed Indy Racing League's traveling photography staff starting in 1996 until his retirement. He also managed the photo archive at IMS which has over 4 million images in the collection.

He is credited with moving the IMS into digital photography. The first digital photography shot at the track was in 1998 with a Canon that cost $20,000. In 2003, the track stopped using film. He managed photography at other events, including all Team Penske owned race tracks and the Detroit Grand Prix and Dallas Grand Prix. McQueeney has spoken internationally about photo safety at racing events.

McQueeney's work has been used in IndyCar video games. His work has been published in and/or used by National Speed Sports News, Indianapolis Monthly, Motor Trend, USA Today, Street Tech, Today, The Birmingham News and other publications and books.

=== Notable works ===
McQueeney was responsible for staging many legendary photographs at the track. In the winter of 1983, he received permission from then IMS track superintendent Charlie Thompson to bring Gordon Johncock's winning car from the 1982 Indianapolis 500 to the track for a photo shoot at the track in snow. In 1989, Emerson Fittipaldi became the first Indy 500 winner to win more than $1 million. Two days after the race, McQueeney set up Fittipaldi's winning car on the track with the Borg-Warner Trophy and had more than $1 million in cash piled upon the car to celebrate the win. The piece has been nicknamed "the money shot."

== Awards and recognition ==
McQueeney collected Corvettes and in 2007, he was named an honorary member of the Chevrolet Corvette Pace Car Registry.

=== Personal life ===
McQueeney lived in Indianapolis, Indiana, and was married. He died on July 14, 2025, after complications from a stroke.
