= Clarence R. Martin =

American judge (1886–1972)

Justice of Indiana Supreme Court
- In office January 3, 1927 – January 3, 1933
- Preceded by: Louis Ewbank
- Succeeded by: James P. Hughes

Personal details
- Born: December 10, 1886
- Died: May 2, 1972 (aged 85) Indianapolis, Indiana, U.S
- Party: Republican
- Education: University of Michigan (JD)

Military service
- Allegiance: United States of America
- Branch/service: United States Army
- Rank: Major
- Battles/wars: World War I

Clarence R. Martin (December 10, 1886 – May 2, 1972) was a justice of the Indiana Supreme Court from January 3, 1927, to January 3, 1933.

Martin began the practice of law in Indiana in 1907, and served in the United States Army during World War I, from 1917 to 1918, attaining the rank of major and commanding an infantry battalion at the front. In 1920, he "served as counsel for a U.S. Senate committee investigating radical activities". Despite his experience in practice, he did not obtain a Juris Doctor degree until 1922, when he graduated from the University of Michigan Law School. Following his law school graduation, he served as campaign manager for Senator Albert J. Beveridge. In 1926, Martin was elected as a Republican to the state supreme court, serving for a time as chief justice.

Martin died at his home in Indianapolis at the age of 85, survived by his wife Nellie, and a son and two daughters.

Political offices
| Preceded by Louis B. Ewbank | Justice of the Indiana Supreme Court; 1927–1933 | Succeeded by James P. Hughes |
