= Plainfield Historic District =

Historic district in Indiana, United States

- U.S. National Register of Historic Places
- U.S. Historic district
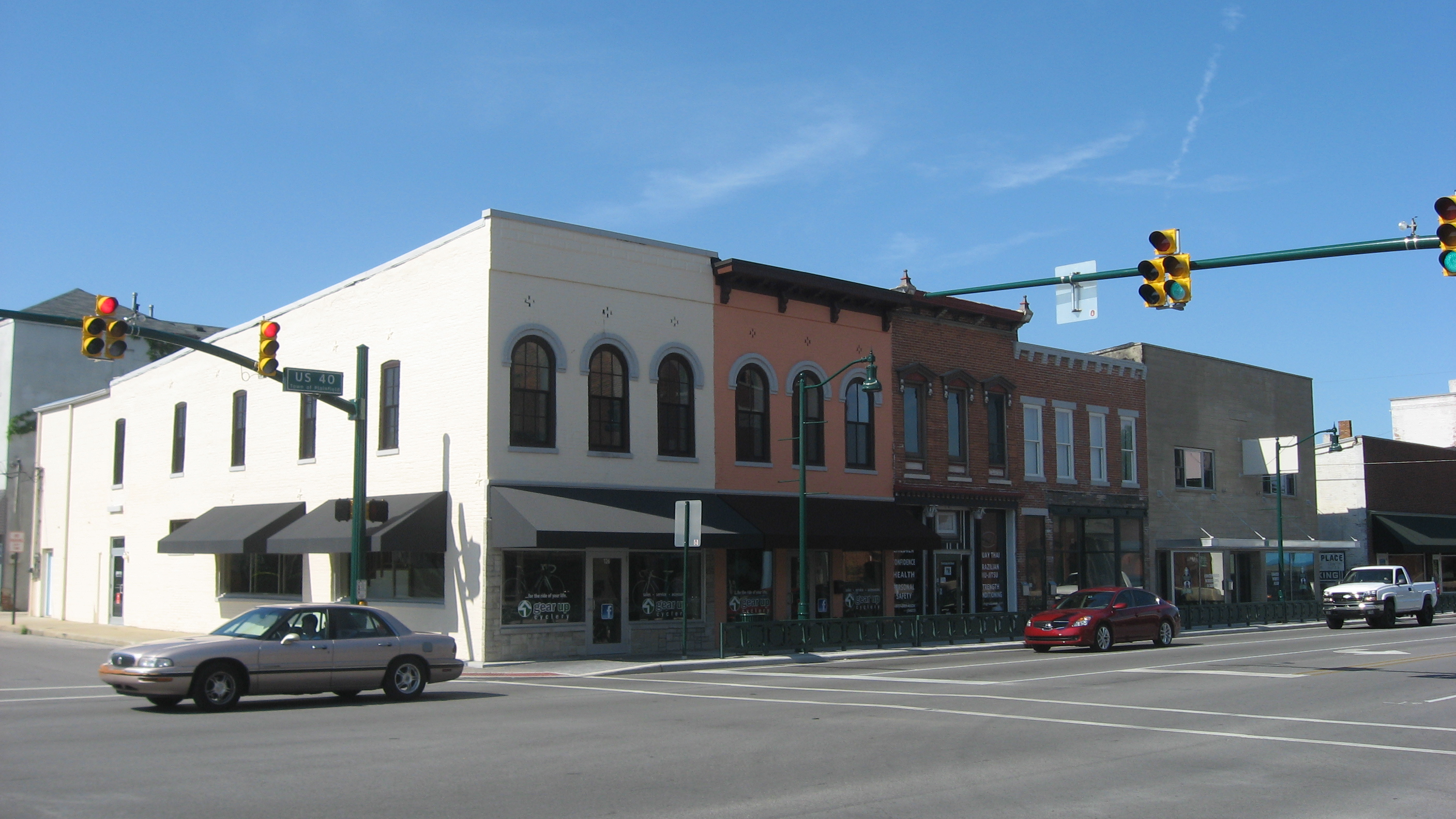
- Main near Center in Plainfield, June 2011

- Location within Indiana Location within the United States
- Location: Roughly bounded by Lincoln St to the N; SE St. to the E; Ash St. to the S.; and S. Mill St to the W., Plainfield, Indiana
- Coordinates: 39°42′11″N 86°24′09″W
- Area: 58.2 acres (23.6 ha)
- Architectural style: Late Victorian, Mid 19th Century Revival
- NRHP reference No.: 10000121
- Added to NRHP: March 31, 2010

Plainfield Historic District is a national historic district located at Plainfield, Indiana. The district encompasses 174 contributing buildings in the central business district and surrounding residential area of Plainfield. The district developed between about 1840 and 1959 and includes notable examples of Greek Revival, Gothic Revival, Italianate, Queen Anne, and Bungalow / American Craftsman style architecture. Notable buildings include the Ezra Cox House (c. 1861–1863), Oscar Hadley House (1891), Plainfield Carnegie Library (1912), Plainfield Methodist Episcopal Church (1891), Bly Bros. Dry Goods Store (c. 1880), Knights of Pythias Building (c. 1900), Prewitt Theater (1927), First National Bank of Plainfield (1903), Mansion House Hotel (1874), Fisher's Tavern (c. 1840), and Quaker Meeting House (1857–1858).

It was added to the National Register of Historic Places in 2010.
