= Judge Hughes (disambiguation) =

Judge Hughes (1944–2013) was an American football player and coach. Judge Hughes may also refer to:

- James Hughes (representative) (1823–1873), judge of the United States Court of Claims
- Lynn Hughes (born 1941), judge of the United States District Court for the Southern District of Texas
- Robert William Hughes (1821–1901), judge of the United States District Court for the Eastern District of Virginia
- Sarah T. Hughes (1896–1985), judge who served on the United States District Court for the Northern District of Texas
- Séamus Hughes (1952–2022), Irish District Court judge
- Ted Hughes (judge) (1927–2020), Canadian judge of the Saskatchewan Court of Queen's Bench
- Todd M. Hughes (born 1966), judge of the United States Court of Appeals for the Federal Circuit

== See also ==
- Justice Hughes (disambiguation)
