= Louis Ewbank =

American judge (1864–1953)

Justice of the Indiana Supreme Court
- In office January 1, 1920 – January 3, 1927
- Appointed by: James P. Goodrich
- Preceded by: Lawson Harvey
- Succeeded by: Clarence R. Martin

Louis Blasdel Ewbank (September 5, 1864 – March 6, 1953) was an American lawyer, politician, judge, and jurist. He served as a justice of the Indiana Supreme Court from January 1, 1920, to January 3, 1927. He was considered by President Warren G. Harding as a potential nominee to the U.S. Supreme Court.

== Biography ==
=== Early life, education, and career ===
Ewbank was born in Guilford, Indiana. He is a descendant of the early Indiana pioneer, John Ewbank, an immigrant from England who settled in Dearborn County in 1811. Louis Ewbank's parents were John William "Will" Ewbank, who worked for the local railroad company, and Betsy Ewbank (née Blasdel).

Louis Ewbank was educated in the schools of Dearborn County. He then became a school teacher. In 1891, Ewbank began reading law at the offices of William Watson Woollen in Lawrenceburg. He attended and graduated from Indiana Law School in Indianapolis (today known as the Indiana University Robert H. McKinney School of Law). From 1910 to 1912, Ewbank practiced law at the firm of Hanan, Ewbank & Hanan in LaGrange before moving to Indianapolis.

From 1897 to 1914, Ewbank was a professor at Indiana Law School and was also a member of the school's board of trustees. He also lectured at Indiana University School of Law Bloomington (now known as Indiana University Maurer School of Law, in Bloomington).

=== Judicial service and later life ===
In 1914, Ewbank was elected judge of the Marion County Circuit Court, a position he held until 1920.

In 1920, Governor James P. Goodrich appointed Ewbank to the Indiana Supreme Court after the death of Justice Lawson Harvey. Ewbank became the most prolific writer of opinions during his time on the court, authoring more than three hundred of them. Ewbank's time on the bench saw the court deal with several cases regarding new Prohibition laws, including people being arrested for possession of alcohol after having their homes searched illegally, without a warrant. The court also tackled a case regarding eugenics, upholding a lower court's ruling that a law allowing for the compulsory sterilization of certain convicted felons was unconstitutional. Ewbank was later re-elected to the court, serving on the bench until 1927, when he chose to retire from the court. He was succeeded by Justice Clarence R. Martin.

After leaving the court, Ewbank continued to practice law at the firm of Whitcomb, Ewbank & Dowden. In 1940, Ewbank began a private practice in partnership with his brother, Richard L. Ewbank. Ewbank retired from law in 1951 due to his failing health. Following the election of Warren G. Harding to the presidency, Ewbank was floated as a possible nominee to the U.S. Supreme Court, but was ultimately not selected.

Ewbank wrote and published many works about Indiana law, including Manual of Indiana Appellate Practice, Indiana Trial Practice, and Indiana Criminal Law (known to many Hoosier lawyers as "the prosecutor's Bible"). He also co-authored Modern Business Corporations and was an editor for Indiana Cumulative Digest from 1910 to 1914. Ewbank also wrote several books about Indiana history and his family's genealogy.

=== Personal life and death ===
In 1893, Ewbank married Mary Effie Shoemaker, who died in 1900.

Many of Ewbank's descendants became lawyers. Ewbank was the great-uncle of Thomas P. Ewbank, a lawyer and patron of the IU Robert H. McKinney School of Law, who is a member of the Indiana University Presidents Circle. Louis Ewbank is also related to Wilbur "Weeb" Ewbank, a prominent football coach who led the Baltimore Colts to two Super Bowl victories.

Ewbank died in Guilford in 1953.

Political offices
Preceded by Lawson Harvey	Justice of the Indiana Supreme Court; 1920–1927	Succeeded by Clarence R. Martin
