= Lawson Harvey =

American judge (1856–1920)

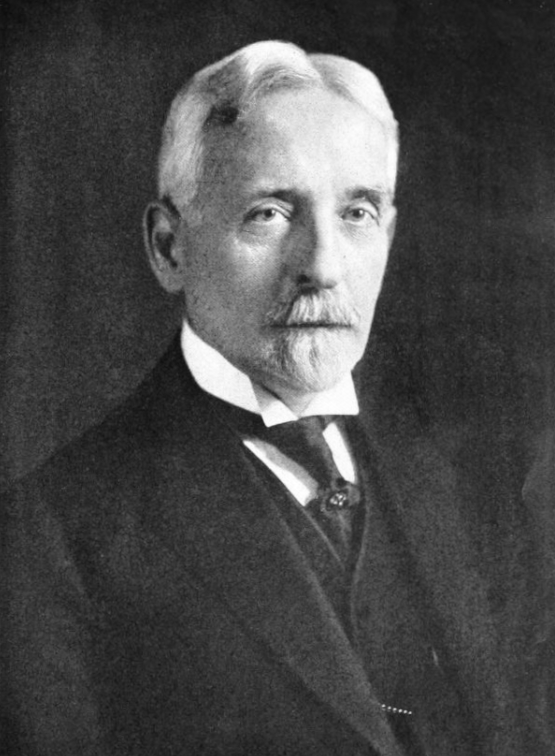

Justice of the Indiana Supreme Court
- In office January 1, 1917 – June 25, 1920
- Preceded by: Charles E. Cox
- Succeeded by: Louis Ewbank

Personal details
- Born: Lawson Moreau Harvey; December 5, 1856; Plainfield, Indiana, United States
- Died: June 25, 1920 (aged 63); Indianapolis, Indiana, United States
- Spouse: Kate Parrott (m. 1882)
- Relations: Thomas B. Harvey (father)
- Children: 3
- Education: Butler University, Haverford College, Indiana University Robert H. McKinney School of Law
- Occupation: Lawyer, politician, judge

Lawson Moreau Harvey (December 5, 1856 – June 25, 1920) was an American lawyer, politician, and judge who served as a justice of the Indiana Supreme Court from January 1, 1917, to June 25, 1920.

== Early life and education ==
Harvey was born in Plainfield, Indiana, to a Quaker family. His father was Dr. Thomas B. Harvey, a prominent medical doctor originally from Harveysburg, Ohio who moved to Plainfield. The elder Harvey built up a large private practice in Indianapolis, was appointed by President Abraham Lincoln to be the examining surgeon for Union soldiers in Indianapolis, and became a professor of children's and women's health at Indiana Medical College in Indianapolis. His mother was Delitha Butler, originally from Liberty, Indiana, noted for her involvement in many philanthropic organizations.

Harvey was educated in Indianapolis public schools and attended Indianapolis Classical School. He then attended Butler University (also in Indianapolis) and Haverford College (in Haverford, Pennsylvania). He received his legal education from Central Law School (in Indianapolis, now known as Indiana University Robert H. McKinney School of Law), graduating in 1882.

== Career ==
Harvey began a private law practice in Indianapolis in 1886 (Ayres, Brown, & Harvey) before being elected judge of the Marion County Superior Court in 1894. Harvey was a Republican. He left the position in 1898 and returned to his private practice before briefly returning to the same bench in 1907, appointed by Governor J. Frank Hanly. His return to the Marion County Superior Court lasted only a year before he again returned to his private practice.

Harvey became a justice of the Indiana Supreme Court in 1917. In October 1917, Harvey wrote a dissenting opinion in the case of Board of Election Commissioners v. Knight, where the court declared a bill in the Indiana Senate that granted women the right to vote in municipal elections was unconstitutional. Harvey stated in his opinion that the General Assembly did have the power to pass such a bill. Another important decision from Harvey came in a case regarding whether the General Assembly had the right to call for a constitutional convention to be held. Harvey was part of the three judge majority that declared the General Assembly did not have the power to do so.

Harvey was involved with a number of charitable organizations throughout his life. He served on the board of directors for the Bertha Esther Ballard Home Association, which provided affordable housing to self-dependent young women. He was also on the board of directors for the Home for Friendless Colored Children. Both of these were Quaker organizations. Harvey also served as secretary and president of the Indianapolis Bar Association and was a member of the Columbia Club. Additionally, he taught medical jurisprudence at the now defunct Medical College of Indiana (in Indianapolis).

== Personal life and death ==
Harvey married Kate Parrott in 1882. They had three children, two sons and one daughter. Their son, Thomas Parrott Harvey, studied law at Haverford College and was a member of the Indiana House of Representatives.

Harvey served on the court until 1920, when he died in office of a stroke.

Political offices
Preceded by Charles E. Cox	Justice of the Indiana Supreme Court; 1917–1920	Succeeded by Louis Ewbank
