= Plainfield High School (Plainfield, Indiana) =

Location
- 1 Red Pride Drive; Plainfield, Indiana 46168; United States; 39°40′45″N 86°22′44″W

Information
- Type: Public high school
- Established: 1897
- School district: Plainfield Community School Corporation
- Principal: Brent Schwanekamp
- Teaching staff: 91.86 (on an FTE basis)
- Grades: 9–12
- Enrollment: 1,781 (2023-2024)
- Student to teacher ratio: 19.39
- Campus: Large suburb
- Color
- Athletics conference: Mid-State
- Nickname: Quakers
- Newspaper: The Quaker Shaker
- Website: www.plainfield.k12.in.us/o/plainfield-high-school

Plainfield High School (PHS), is a public high school in Plainfield, Indiana, United States. The vast majority of the town of Plainfield is within the Plainfield Community School Corporation.

== History ==
In March 2008, the school hosted then-Democratic candidate for President Barack Obama.

== Athletics ==
Plainfield is a part of the Mid-State Conference. They compete under the name "Quakers" (or Lady Quakers), and the school colors are scarlet and royal blue.

The following IHSAA sports are offered at Plainfield (unless marked, there are separate boys' and girls' teams):

- Baseball (boys')
- Basketball
  - Boys' state 3A champion - 1999
- Cross country
- Football (boys')
- Golf
- Soccer
- Softball (girls')
  - State 4A champion - 2012
- Swimming
- Tennis
- Track
  - Boys' state champion - 2022
- Volleyball (girls')
- Wrestling (boys')

== Notable alumni ==
- Dee Bell - jazz singer
- Edd Cantrell - former police officer
- Del Harris - current vice-president of Texas Legends of NBA Development League; former head coach of the NBA's Houston Rockets, Milwaukee Bucks, and Los Angeles Lakers; assistant coach for various NBA teams, including Rockets, Bucks, Dallas Mavericks, Chicago Bulls, and New Jersey Nets
- James Hurst - retired NFL offensive tackle
- Jason Pociask - former NFL fullback and tight end for New York Jets, New England Patriots, Tampa Bay Buccaneers, Indianapolis Colts, Carolina Panthers, Seattle Seahawks and Dallas Cowboys; played one season for Florida Tuskers of UFL
- Haris Suleman - Pakistani-American aviator who died while attempting to circumnavigate the world as the youngest pilot in history
- Brad Wright - 2020 Indianapolis 500 winning Crew Chief
- Dr. Chris Stout ('77) - psychologist

== See also ==
- List of high schools in Indiana
