= Babar and Haris Suleman =

American pilot (1996–2014)

- Born: December 27, 1958 in Pakistan (Babar Suleman); October 3, 1996 in Plainfield, Indiana, United States (Haris Suleman)
- Died: July 22, 2014 (aged 55) (Babar Suleman); July 22, 2014 (aged 17) (Haris Suleman); Pago Pago, American Samoa, United States
- Burial place: Maple Hill Cemetery, Plainfield, Indiana (Haris Suleman)
- Occupation: Aviators
- Known for: Attempted around-the-world flight
- Relatives: Rao Qamar Suleman
- Awards: Sitara-i-Imtiaz (2015)

Babar Suleman (Urdu: بابر سلیمان; December 27, 1958 – July 22, 2014) and Haris Suleman (Urdu: حارث سلیمان; October 3, 1996 – July 22, 2014) were a Pakistani-American father-son pilot duo who were attempting to fly around the world in 30 days to promote education, when their single-engine plane crashed into the South Pacific Ocean near Pago Pago on 22 July 2014 on the final leg of their journey, killing Haris and leaving his father Babar, also on board, missing.

Had Babar and Haris completed the trip, they would have set the world record for the fastest circumnavigation of the world in a single-engine plane; Haris, at age 17, would have also become the youngest pilot to lead such a journey. Haris' body was retrieved during a search-and-rescue effort, however Babar was never found. Their mission was highlighted in the media, and over $3.1 million worth of donations were raised for their charity project following their death. In recognition of their work, Babar and Haris Suleman were posthumously conferred the Sitara-i-Imtiaz civil award by the government of Pakistan in 2015.

== Background ==
The Sulemans belonged to a family of aviators. Their hometown is Okara, located in Punjab. Babar's elder brother, Rao Qamar Suleman, served as the Chief of Air Staff of the Pakistan Air Force (PAF) from 2009 to 2012. His brother-in-law, Abid Rao is also a former air vice-marshal in the PAF and a defence analyst. Babar was married to Shamim Babar. The couple had two sons – Cyrus and Haris, and daughter Hiba. Haris was the youngest of the three children.

=== Babar Suleman ===
Babar studied at the PAF College Sargodha and aspired to join the PAF, but was unable to clear a medical fitness test. He then pursued a degree in engineering at the University of Engineering and Technology in Taxila and migrated to the United States in 1983–84 at age 25, shortly after marriage, to undertake postgraduate studies at the University of Wisconsin. After his graduation, the Sulemans settled in the New York metropolitan area and Babar worked in various jobs as a civil and construction engineer. They became naturalised American citizens soon after. In the early 1990s, they decided to move from the fast-paced life of New York and settled in the town of Plainfield, Indiana, where Babar took up a job with an energy company. It was to become their final destination, and where Haris was born in October 1996. Babar was well known in the local community, partaking in multiple extracurricular activities and coaching the boys and girls' soccer teams at Plainfield High School. While in Plainfield, Babar also rediscovered his passion for flying. In 2004–05, he began taking flying lessons and obtained his private pilot's license. He later purchased his own aircraft and began taking consulting assignments around the country which required flying.

In early 2014, he expressed his interest to plan an around-the-world trip and began discussing the idea with other pilots, who encouraged him by mentioning how common such flights were. He also decided to dedicate the trip toward the cause of education in Pakistan, pledging to fundraise $1 million by flying around the world in 30 days. According to his family, he had often floated the idea of flying to his native Pakistan in his own plane, which was usually met with ridicule and dissuasion. Babar however appeared content with the plan and was not overly concerned with the safety implications that, as insisted by his family, such a long journey could bring, once remarking: "If it’s not your time, it’s not your time. But when it is – no matter how many iron curtains you hide behind, the grim reaper will get you. But if you go supporting a noble cause, you have made a point and achieved your goal." According to Babar, the purpose of the trip was not to make or break a record; in fact, it did not matter much to him if the trip took longer, as the key focus was on the "mission" which was to help develop schools in rural Pakistan.

=== Haris Suleman ===
Haris Suleman was born on 3 October 1996 in Plainfield, Indiana. He was a student at Plainfield High School. Haris was inspired by his father and wanted to learn flying like him too. At the age of eight, he began accompanying his father on his flights on their private plane. Thus, when the "opportunity arose to join [his father] to achieve a life-long dream, Haris jumped at the chance." At age 17, Haris finished flight school and attained his private pilot's license, logging around 50 hours of flying time prior to their world tour.

== Flight ==
The father-son duo were raising money for a charity organisation based in Pakistan, The Citizens Foundation, which educates Pakistan's poorest children. They departed Indiana on 19 June 2014 and were attempting to fly around the world in 30 days – a 26,500-mile (42,673-km) journey with 25 stops in 15 countries – and with Haris on board, they hoped to break the world record for the youngest pilot-in-command in history to circumnavigate the Earth in a single-engine plane in 30 days. The Sulemans made pit stops in Iceland, London, Rome, Cairo and Al Ain, before landing in their native Pakistan, where they were given a warm reception and interviewed by local press. They then continued their journey en route to Colombo, Kuala Lumpur, Bali, Australia and Fiji, before landing in Pago Pago in American Samoa. During their stopovers, they visited the local sites and caught up with family and friends. Around 60 percent of their journey was over the vast waters of the Atlantic, Pacific and Indian oceans.

The Sulemans were on the final leg of their trip, flying from Pago Pago to Hawaii via Kiribati in their Hawker Beechcraft Bonanza A36 (registration N20TC) – also planning a stop in California before returning to Indiana – when their plane crashed into the South Pacific Ocean on 22 July 2014 at 9.58 pm local time (23 July, 8:58 am UTC), only two days before their scheduled return home, shortly after taking off from Pago Pago International Airport. Prior to departure, the duo completed their preflight checks and Babar appeared satisfied with the weather conditions. The departure time was reportedly set for night so that they could take advantage of daylight hours when landing in Hawaii. Soon after takeoff, witnesses present at the airport reported seeing the aircraft bear right and then suddenly descend into the ocean before disappearing, instead of gaining altitude.

== Aftermath ==
Following the crash, the US Coast Guard launched a search operation in the area and recovered Haris' body on 23 July at 12.40 am local time along with some debris. However, they were unable to locate Babar and the plane wreckage. After days of searching unsuccessfully, the operation was called off on 27 July. A memorial service and wreath laying ceremony was held at sea, at the site where the plane crashed. It was attended by members of the Suleman family. Haris Suleman was buried at Maple Hill Cemetery in Plainfield, Indiana on 1 August.

Their death was condoled by political leaders in Pakistan, including prime minister Nawaz Sharif, Sindh governor Ishratul Ibad and former president Asif Ali Zardari, who paid tribute by comparing Haris' efforts for education in Pakistan with those of teenage activist Malala Yousafzai. In the United States, Haris' feat was mentioned by André Carson during a proceeding of the Congress. On August 20, 2014, the government of Pakistan posthumously conferred the Sitara-i-Imtiaz, the third highest civil award in Pakistan, by president Mamnoon Hussain to both Babar and Haris Suleman in honour of their public service efforts. The ceremony was held on 23 March 2015.

Pakistani-American actor Faran Tahir announced he would produce a documentary on the lives of the Sulemans. At the time of their death, the Sulemans had raised about half of their target of $1 million that they were aiming to collect for their cause during the journey. A childhood friend of Babar's, Ashar Aziz, pledged the remaining half. A large amount of donations continued to pour in after their death, eventually fundraising up to $3.1 million. The money was used to fund two new school campuses in Okara and Islamabad. The Suleman family also set up a scholarship fund for students of Plainfield High School, where Haris studied.

== See also ==
- Fakhar-e-Alam, first Pakistani to circumnavigate the world in a solo flight.
- Shahzada Dawood, British-Pakistani businessman who died in the Titan submersible implosion
