= Del Harris =

American basketball coach (born 1937)

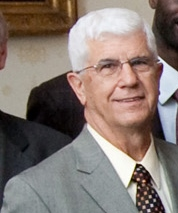
- Harris with the Chicago Bulls in 2009

Texas Legends
- Title: Vice president
- League: NBA G League

Personal information
- Born: June 18, 1937 (age 89) Dale, Indiana, U.S.
- Listed height: 6 ft 4 in (1.93 m)
- Listed weight: 205 lb (93 kg)

Career information
- High school: Plainfield (Plainfield, Indiana)
- College: Milligan (1955–1959)
- Position: Forward
- Coaching career: 1961–2012

Career highlights
- As coach: NBA Coach of the Year (1995); Chuck Daly Lifetime Achievement Award (2020); Coach Wooden "Keys to Life" Award (2014); 3× Puerto Rican League champion (1973–1975)

Career coaching record
- NBA: 556–457 (.549)
- Record at Basketball Reference
- Basketball Hall of Fame
Medals
Representing United States
Basketball
FIBA World Championship
Bronze medal – third place	1998 Greece	National team

Delmer William Harris (born June 18, 1937) is an American basketball coach who is currently the vice president of the Texas Legends, the NBA G League affiliate of the Dallas Mavericks. He served as a head coach for the NBA's Houston Rockets, Milwaukee Bucks, and Los Angeles Lakers, as well as the Legends. He was also an assistant coach for the National Basketball Association's New Jersey Nets, Chicago Bulls, Dallas Mavericks, Milwaukee Bucks, and the Houston Rockets.

== Early life and college career ==
Harris is a 1955 graduate of Plainfield High School in Plainfield, Indiana. He was inducted into the first class of Plainfield High School's Hall of Fame.

Harris graduated from Milligan College in 1959 cum laude with a bachelor's degree in religious studies. He was a 3-time All-Conference basketball player for Coach Duard Walker, in addition to the Honorable Mention Little All-American recognition while at Milligan. In 1965, Harris earned a master's degree in history from Indiana University.

== High school coach ==
He began his coaching career at the Junior High School level in Johnson City, Tennessee but is best known for his tenure in his native Indiana; in four years in the Indiana ranks he built a record of 54–15 over his last three seasons, winning two Conference titles and a Sectional title.

He coached at three different high schools in Indiana; the Roachdale Hawks, the Dale Golden Aces and the Spencer Cops; his greatest success came at Dale, as he led the Golden Aces to a 2-year record of 35–9 and a Pocket Athletic Conference title. He also coached the Dale baseball team to a PAC title and a record of 26–7; his success built using players such as Roger Kaiser and Bob Reinhart. He moved to Spencer for the 1964–65 season where they had a 19–6 record, winning another Conference title and an IHSAA Sectional title but lost in the Regional finals to Bloomington. The following year, he was hired by Earlham College.

== College coach ==
Harris was coach at Earlham College in Richmond, Indiana for nine seasons, building a record of 175–70 (.714) as he led the Quakers to three Conference (2 Hoosier Collegiate Conf. & 1 Hoosier-Buckeye Collegiate Conf) titles and two Top-12 rankings. His best seasons were 1967–68 when they were ranked 6th in the NAIA final polls with a 25–3 record, making him a finalist for NAIA national coach of the year, and in 1970–71, when the Quakers achieved a record of 24–5. In that year they won the HBCC and reached the National tournament, losing in the 2nd round. He remains, today, as the Earlham coaching leader in wins and winning percentage. He led the Quakers to 15 conference or tournament titles during his tenure.

== Professional coach ==
Harris coached seven summers in the Superior League of Puerto Rico while at Earlham, winning three national titles while coaching against various ABA, NBA and NCAA coaches. He coached the Iberia Superstars of the European Professional Basketball League in early 1975.

After becoming acquainted with Utah Stars head coach Tom Nissalke, he was invited into the professional ranks in 1975 as an assistant coach for Nissalke at the Utah Stars of the American Basketball Association (ABA). When that franchise folded, Nissalke and Harris were hired as head and assistant coach, respectively, for the NBA's Houston Rockets at the start of the 1976–77 season. They won the Central Division that year, Nissalke earning Coach of the Year honors.

When Nissalke was let go by the club after the 1979 season, Harris was asked to take over head coaching duties for the 1979–80 season. Harris led the Rockets to the NBA Finals in the 1981 season, where they were defeated by the Boston Celtics four games to two in Larry Bird's first championship. Hall of Famer Moses Malone made Harris the Rockets' winningest coach in the first three years with 128 wins and three trips to the playoffs, but when Philadelphia acquired Malone in free agency, the Rockets sacrificed the season to get Ralph Sampson in the draft. Not signing any of their own free agents, the Rockets finished last and Harris was replaced with Bill Fitch.

Don Nelson hired Harris for the Milwaukee Bucks team, where he became head coach four years later when Nelson left for Golden State after experiencing a rift with Bucks owner Herb Kohl. A year later Harris was also named Vice President of Basketball Operations. Harris would resign from his coaching position near the beginning of the 1991–92 season, and then a few months later step down as Vice President.

After his stint with the Bucks, Harris became head coach of the Los Angeles Lakers, winning NBA Coach of the Year honors in 1994–95, winning 48 games a year removed from being in the NBA lottery. In his four full seasons the Lakers won more each successive season, following 48 wins with 53, 56 and 61. In his third season the Lakers acquired 18-year-old Kobe Bryant and 24-year-old Shaquille O'Neal. Despite being the youngest team in the league and O'Neal missing 53 games due to injuries those two seasons, the Lakers eliminated the 61-win Seattle SuperSonics in the playoffs before being eliminated by the Utah Jazz with Karl Malone and John Stockton in the 1997–98 season. The Lakers fired Harris after leading them to a 6–6 start at the beginning of the lockout-shortened 1998–99 season following a loss to the Vancouver Grizzlies.

Harris was an assistant coach for the Dallas Mavericks from 2000 to 2007.

On July 3, 2008, the Chicago Tribune reported that Harris agreed to become an assistant coach for the Chicago Bulls along with former Charlotte Bobcats head coach Bernie Bickerstaff and longtime NBA assistant Bob Ociepka. Along with Bickerstaff and Ociepka, Harris was expected to help establish a veteran presence on the coaching staff and help rookie head coach Vinny Del Negro. In June 2009, it was reported that Harris would step down as assistant coach to the Bulls, and retire after a career spanning 50 years.

On November 30, 2009, after the New Jersey Nets had lost their first 18 games and removed coach Lawrence Frank, GM Kiki VanDeWeghe asked Harris to come help him as he took over the coaching reins. Harris stayed until the week before the All-Star game and announced he would not continue on the rest of the season. He returned to his home in the Dallas area to be the General Manager of the Texas Legends of the NBA Development League, the Mavericks minor league affiliate.

On October 3, 2011, it was announced that Harris would take over as the head coach for the Dallas Mavericks' NBA Development League affiliate the Texas Legends. At age 74 he was the oldest head coach in the history of the NBA system. The following year, he returned to being GM and Eduardo Najera was named head coach. Currently Harris is the Vice President of the Legends.

Starting with the 2017–2018 season, he is serving as a pregame and postgame analyst on Mavs Live on Fox Sports Southwest.

== International ==
Harris coached seven seasons in Puerto Rico's National Superior League (1969–75), posting a 176–61 record and winning three national championships (1973–75). His club team, the Bayamón Vaqueros, won bronze in the FIBA Will Jones Cup in 1973 in São Paulo Brazil, the championships for World Club team. He also served as head coach of the National Team for the CentroBasket games in El Salvador in 1973, winning the first international gold in Puerto Rico's history. He also coached the team to a silver in the FIBA Copa do America X Europa in São Paulo, Brazil in 1974.

In 1994, he served as consultant for Canada and assisted head coach, Ken Shields, in the World Games in Toronto.

He was an assistant coach under Rudy Tomjanovich with the US national team in the 1998 FIBA World Championship, winning the bronze medal. The team was handicapped by only using college players as there was a lockout in the NBA.

Harris also served as the first foreigner to become coach of the Chinese national men's team, where he coached NBA All-Star center Yao Ming and led China to a surprising upset victory over Serbia and Montenegro in the 2004 Athens Olympic basketball tournament.

In the fall of 2011, Harris assisted coach John Calipari with the Dominican Republic national team. They won bronze in 2011 FIBA Americas Championship in Mar del Plata, Argentina (the first major basketball medal in the Dominic Republic's history). In winning the bronze medal they qualified for the 2012 World Olympic qualifier in Caracas, Venezuela. They finished fourth, thus missing to qualify for the Olympics by one game in both years. They did win the gold medal at the CentroBasket Games held in Puerto Rico prior to the World Qualifier, beating the host time for the first time ever on their home court.

In 2010, he was awarded the Jerry Colangelo Award for Leadership and character on and off the court at the NBA All-Star Game in Los Angeles. In 2014, he received the Coach John Wooden "Keys to Excellence" Award the NCAA Final Four in Dallas.

He is a member of the Indiana Basketball Hall of Fame, the NAIA Basketball Hall of Fame as well as those of Milligan College and Earlham College.

== Personal life ==
Harris is the father of five children including Golden State Warriors Assistant General manager Larry Harris.

Harris is a devout Christian and is involved in several Christian organizations, among those organizations is the Del and Ann Harris Foundation, which promotes Christian education and missions.

== Legacy ==
On February 15, 2019, Harris was named as one of two 2019 recipients of the John Bunn Award (with Harry Glickman), awarded by the Naismith Memorial Basketball Hall of Fame as a lifetime achievement honor for those "whose outstanding accomplishments have impacted the high school, college, professional and/or the international game."

On April 2, 2022, Harris was announced as one of sixteen members to be inducted into the Naismith Basketball Hall of Fame for the Class of 2022 and inducted September 10, 2022.

== Acting ==
Harris appeared in some minor roles in Space Jam, Over the Top, In the House, and Diagnosis Murder.

== Head coaching record ==
=== College ===
Record table
Season	Team	Overall	Conference	Standing	Postseason
Earlham Quakers (NAIA independent) (1965–1966)
1965–66	Earlham	14–8			
Earlham Quakers (Hoosier College Conference / Hoosier–Buckeye Conference) (1966–1975)
1966–67	Earlham	15–9	6–6	4th	
1967–68	Earlham	25–3	11–1	1st	NAIA District 21 Playoffs
1968–69	Earlham	18–8	9–3	2nd	NAIA District 21 Playoffs
1969–70	Earlham	22–8	10–2	2nd	NAIA District 21 Playoffs
1970–71	Earlham	24–5	7–1	1st	NAIA Second Round
1971–72	Earlham	21–9	7–1	1st	NAIA District 21 Playoffs
1972–73	Earlham	17–11	10–6	3rd	NAIA District 21 Playoffs
1973–74	Earlham	19–9	10–6	3rd	NAIA District 21 Playoffs
Earlham:		175–70	70–26		
Total:		175–70			
National champion Postseason invitational champion Conference regular season champion Conference regular season and conference tournament champion Division regular season champion Division regular season and conference tournament champion Conference tournament champion

=== NBA ===
Legend
Regular season	G	Games coached	W	Games won	L	Games lost	W–L %	Win–loss %
Playoffs	PG	Playoff games	PW	Playoff wins	PL	Playoff losses	PW–L %	Playoff win–loss %

Team	Year	G	W	L	W–L%	Finish	PG	PW	PL	PW–L%	Result
Houston	1979–80	82	41	41	.500	2nd in Central	7	2	5	.286	Lost in Conference semifinals
Houston	1980–81	82	40	42	.488	2nd in Midwest	21	12	9	.571	Lost in NBA Finals
Houston	1981–82	82	46	36	.561	2nd in Midwest	3	1	2	.333	Lost in First round
Houston	1982–83	82	14	68	.171	6th in Midwest	—	—	—	—	Missed Playoffs
Milwaukee	1987–88	82	42	40	.512	4th in Central	5	2	3	.400	Lost in First round
Milwaukee	1988–89	82	49	33	.598	4th in Central	9	3	6	.333	Lost in Conference semifinals
Milwaukee	1989–90	82	44	38	.537	3rd in Central	4	1	3	.250	Lost in First round
Milwaukee	1990–91	82	48	34	.585	3rd in Central	3	0	3	.000	Lost in First round
Milwaukee	1991–92	17	8	9	.471	(resigned)	—	—	—	—	—
L.A. Lakers	1994–95	82	48	34	.585	3rd in Pacific	10	5	5	.500	Lost in Conference semifinals
L.A. Lakers	1995–96	82	53	29	.646	2nd in Pacific	4	1	3	.250	Lost in First round
L.A. Lakers	1996–97	82	56	26	.683	2nd in Pacific	9	4	5	.444	Lost in Conference semifinals
L.A. Lakers	1997–98	82	61	21	.744	1st in Pacific	13	7	6	.538	Lost in Conference finals
L.A. Lakers	1998–99	12	6	6	.500	(fired)	—	—	—	—	—
Career		1,013	556	457	.549		88	38	50	.432	

=== D-League ===
Legend
Regular season	G	Games coached	W	Games won	L	Games lost	W–L %	Win–loss %
Playoffs	PG	Playoff games	PW	Playoff wins	PL	Playoff losses	PW–L %	Playoff win–loss %

Team	Year	G	W	L	W–L%	Finish	PG	PW	PL	PW–L%	Result
Texas Legends	2011–12	50	24	26	.480	4th in Western	—	—	—	—	Missed Playoffs
Career		50	24	26	.480	—	—	—	—	—	

== Awards ==
Harris has been inducted into the Plainfield High School Hall of Fame, the Indiana Basketball Hall of Fame, the Milligan College Hall of Fame, and the National Association of Intercollegiate Athletics Hall of Fame. On April 2, 2022, he was elected to the National Basketball Hall of Fame.
