= James Hurst (American football) =

American football player (born 1991)

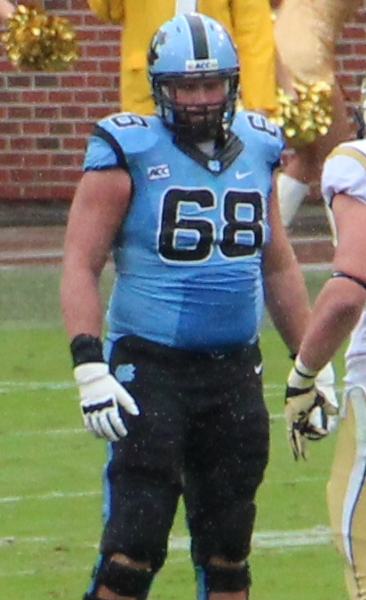
- Hurst with North Carolina in 2013

No. 74
- Position: Offensive tackle

Personal information
- Born: December 17, 1991 (age 34); Danville, Indiana, U.S.
- Listed height: 6 ft 5 in (1.96 m)
- Listed weight: 310 lb (141 kg)

Career information
- High school: Plainfield (IN)
- College: North Carolina (2010–2013)
- NFL draft: 2014: undrafted

Career history
- Baltimore Ravens (2014–2019); New Orleans Saints (2020–2023)

Awards and highlights
- First-team All-ACC (2013); 2× Second-team All-ACC (2011, 2012); Freshman All-American (2010)

Career NFL statistics
- Games played: 150
- Games started: 95
- Stats at Pro Football Reference

James Hurst (born December 17, 1991) is an American former professional football player who was an offensive tackle in the National Football League (NFL). He played college football for the North Carolina Tar Heels and was signed by the Baltimore Ravens as an undrafted free agent in 2014. He also played in the NFL for the New Orleans Saints.

== Early life ==
A former standout at Plainfield High School, Hurst was named to the 2009 USA Today All-American team, and played in the Under Armour All-America Game. He earned his undergraduate degree in exercise and sport science from University of North Carolina at Chapel Hill and later earned Master of Business Administration from Kelley School of Business at Indiana University Bloomington.

== College career ==
As a freshman, Hurst earned freshman All-American honors by Rivals.com, Phil Steele, and The Sporting News. He appeared in all 13 games and started at left tackle in all but the first game. He graded out at a team high of 83% and was third on the team with 33 knock-down blocks.

== Professional career ==
Pre-draft measurables
Height	Weight	Arm length	Hand span	40-yard dash	10-yard split	20-yard split	20-yard shuttle	Vertical jump	Bench press
6 ft 5 1/4 in (1.96 m)	296 lb (134 kg)	33 3/4 in (0.86 m)	10 1/8 in (0.26 m)	5.59 s	1.93 s	3.25 s	4.73 s	22.0 in (0.56 m)	20 reps
All values from NFL Combine/Pro Day

=== Baltimore Ravens ===
Hurst signed with the Baltimore Ravens as an undrafted free agent on May 10, 2014.

Hurst became a full-time starter for the Ravens in 2017, starting all 16 games at left guard.

On March 12, 2018, Hurst signed a four-year contract extension with the Ravens.

In 2019, Hurst was demoted to a backup role after being overtaken on the depth chart, starting only two games at left tackle.

On February 14, 2020, Hurst was suspended the first four games of the 2020 season for violating the NFL's policy on performance-enhancing substances. He was released on March 16, 2020.

=== New Orleans Saints ===
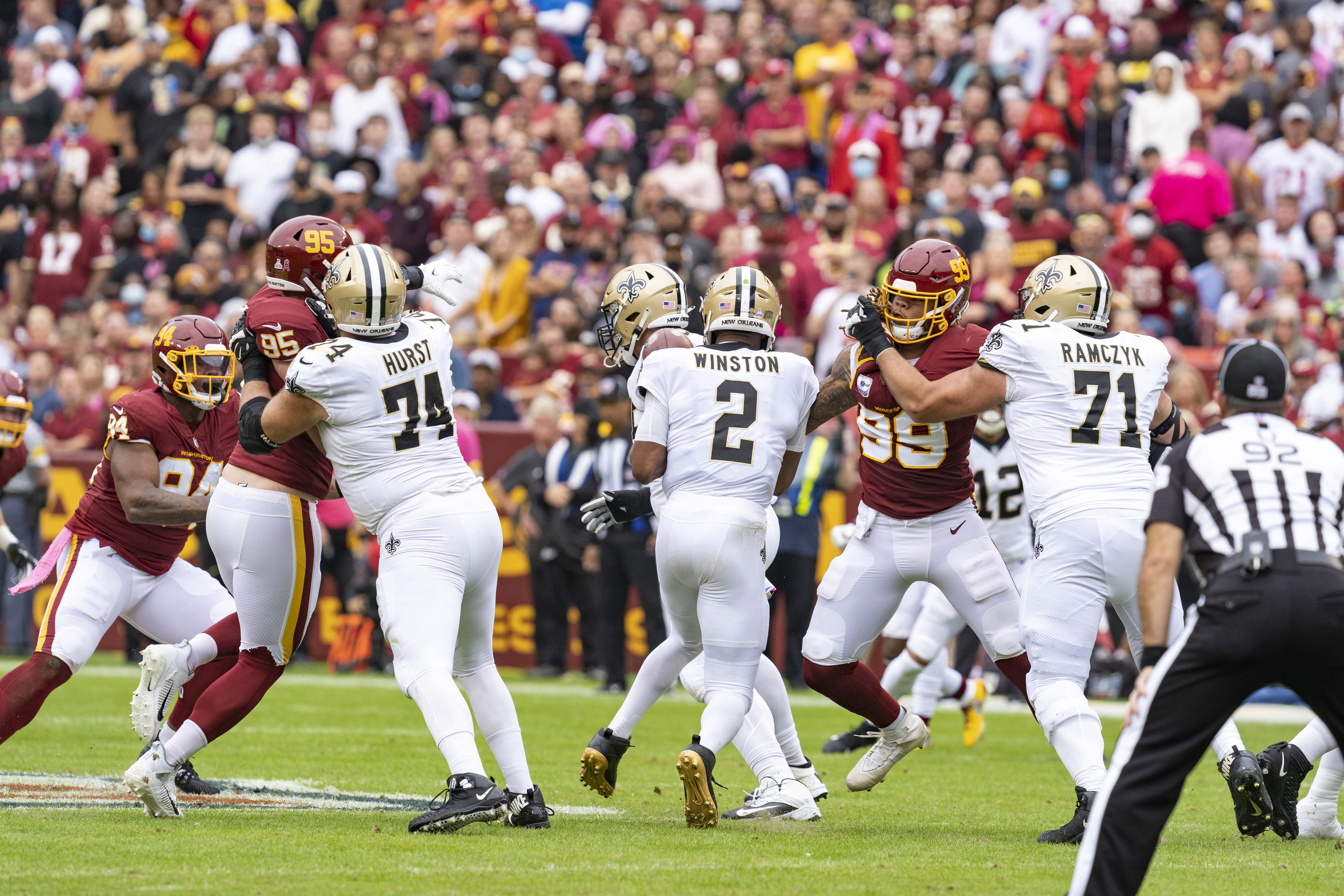
Hurst (left) playing for the Saints in 2021.

Hurst signed with the New Orleans Saints on May 28, 2020. He was reinstated from suspension on October 5, and was activated on October 12.

On March 15, 2021, Hurst signed a three-year contract extension with the Saints.

On April 24, 2024, Hurst announced his retirement from professional football.

=== NFL career statistics ===
Year	Team	Games	Starts
2014	BAL	16	5
2015	BAL	16	8
2016	BAL	16	3
2017	BAL	16	16
2018	BAL	10	10
2019	BAL	16	2
2020	NO	12	5
2021	NO	17	15
2022	NO	16	16
2023	NO	15	15
Career		150	95
