= Plainfield, Indiana =

- Town
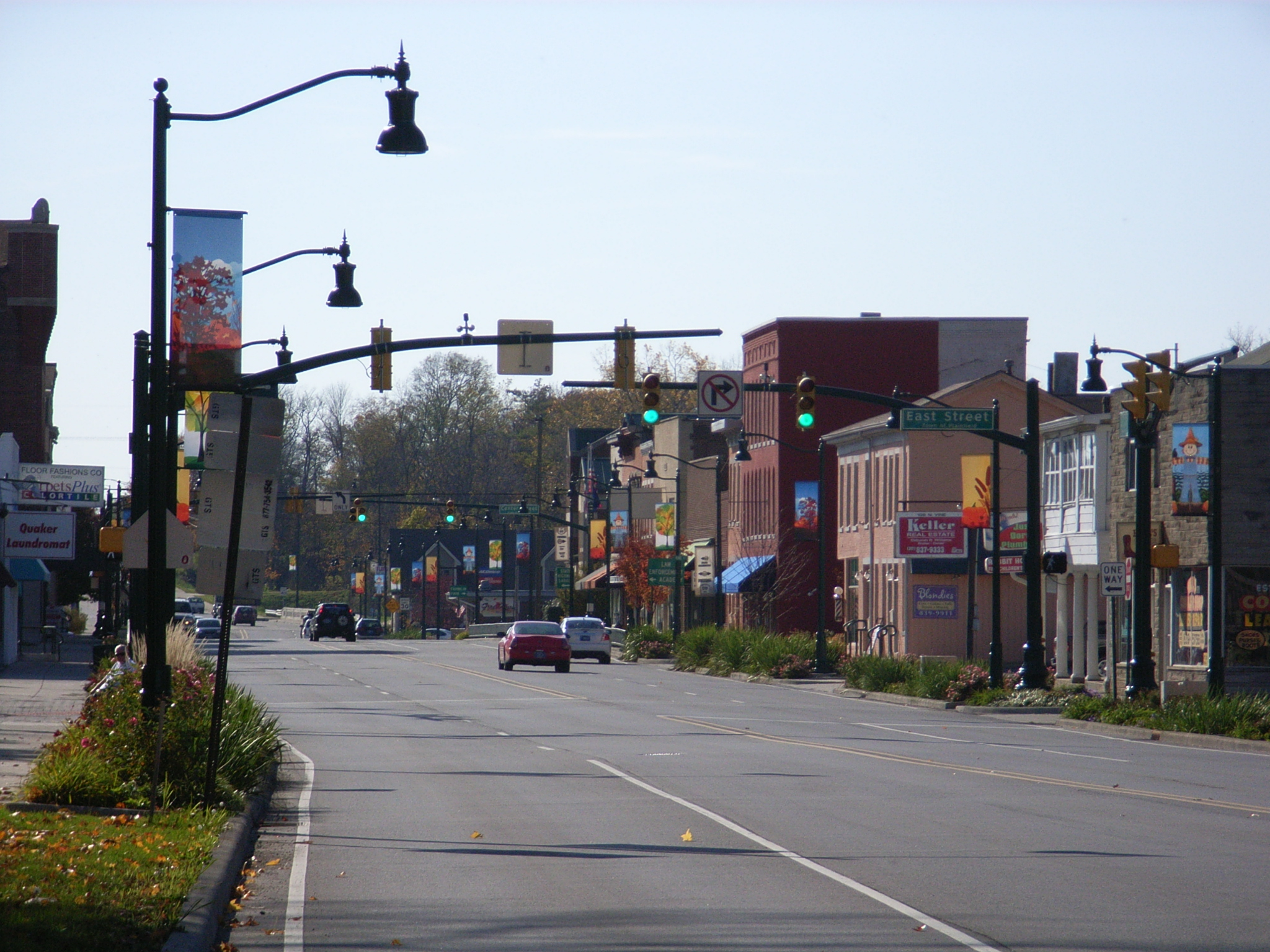
- Plainfield Town Center

- Flag Seal
- Motto: "A Community of Values"
- Location of Plainfield in Hendricks County, Indiana.
- Coordinates: 39°41′51″N 86°23′15″W
- Country: United States
- State: Indiana
- County: Hendricks
- Township: Guilford, Liberty, Washington
- Incorporated: 1839

Government
  - Type: Town council
  - Town manager: Andrew Klinger

Area
  - Total: 26.12 sq mi (67.66 km^{2})
  - Land: 26.00 sq mi (67.33 km^{2})
  - Water: 0.13 sq mi (0.33 km^{2})
- Elevation: 745 ft (227 m)

Population (2020)
  - Total: 34,625
  - Density: 1,332.0/sq mi (514.28/km^{2})
- Time zone: UTC−5 (EST)
  - Summer (DST): UTC−4 (EDT)
- ZIP code: 46168
- Area codes: 317/463
- FIPS code: 18-60246
- GNIS feature ID: 2396859
- Website: www.townofplainfield.com

Plainfield is a town in Guilford, Liberty, and Washington townships, Hendricks County, Indiana, United States. The population was 27,631 at the 2010 census, and in 2022 the estimated population was 36,074.

== History ==
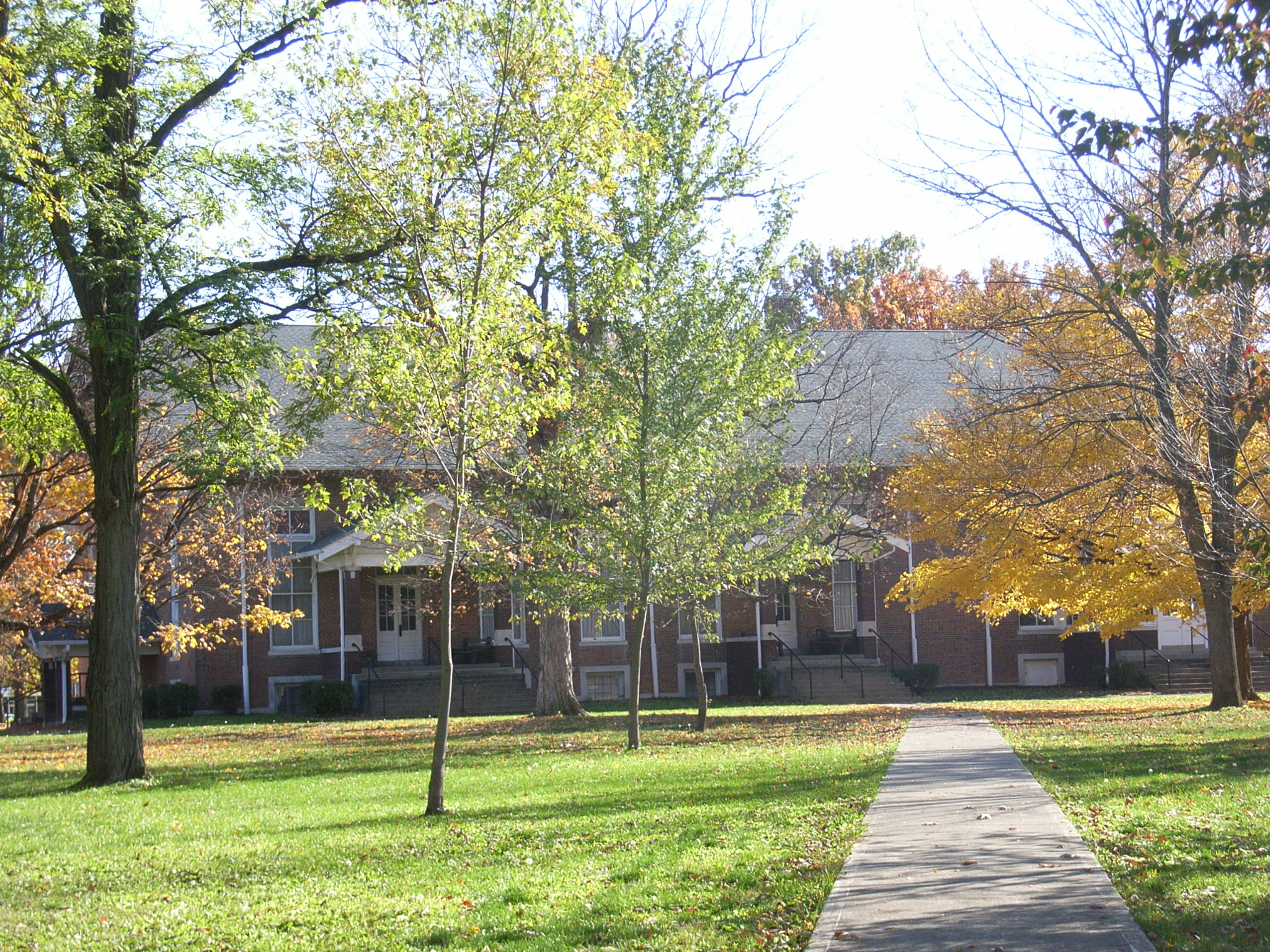
Plainfield Friends Meeting

In 1822, a tract of land which included the area now known as Plainfield was obtained by Jeremiah Hadley of Preble County, Ohio. Ten years later he sold it to his son, Elias Hadley. Levi Jessup and Elias Hadley laid out the town in 1839. Plainfield was incorporated as a town in 1839. The town got its name from the early Friends (Quakers) who settled around the area and established several meetinghouses throughout the county, including the important Western Yearly Meeting of Friends in Plainfield. The Friends were "plain" people, and thus the name "Plainfield". The high school continues to honor the Quakers, using the name for the school's mascot.

Plainfield has long been associated with the National Road, U.S. Route 40, which goes through town as Main Street. One incident which brought Plainfield national attention occurred in 1842 when former President Martin Van Buren was spilled deliberately from his stagecoach into the thick mud of the highway. The practical joke came as a result of Van Buren's vetoing a bill from Congress to improve the highway, a move which angered Western settlers. When Van Buren came through Plainfield on a swing to shore up his popularity for the 1844 election, a group of perpetrators set up the incident. The elm tree whose roots caused the president's carriage to topple became known as the Van Buren Elm. An elementary school near this site is named Van Buren Elementary School.

In the 1980s Plainfield became the headquarters of the Islamic Society of North America.

== Geography ==
According to the 2010 census, Plainfield has a total area of 22.38 square miles (57.96 km^{2}), of which 22.27 square miles (57.68 km^{2}) (or 99.51%) is land and 0.11 square miles (0.28 km^{2}) (or 0.49%) is water.

Plainfield is located in the Central Till Plains region of the United States. There are few moderately sized hills, and a mix of deciduous forests and prairie covers much of the area within the town limits. White Lick Creek, a tributary of the White River, flows north to south through the western side of Plainfield. On the eastern side of town, Clark's Creek, a tributary of White Lick Creek, flows towards the south.

== Demographics ==
Historical population
Census	Pop.	Note	%±
1850	251		—
1870	795		—
1880	50		−93.7%
1890	909		1,718.0%
1910	1,303		—
1920	1,373		5.4%
1930	1,617		17.8%
1940	1,811		12.0%
1950	2,585		42.7%
1960	5,460		111.2%
1970	8,211		50.4%
1980	9,191		11.9%
1990	10,433		13.5%
2000	18,396		76.3%
2010	27,631		50.2%
2020	34,625		25.3%
Source: US Census Bureau

=== 2020 census ===
As of the 2020 census, Plainfield had a population of 34,625. The median age was 37.6 years. 22.9% of residents were under the age of 18 and 15.4% of residents were 65 years of age or older. For every 100 females there were 109.2 males, and for every 100 females age 18 and over there were 110.2 males age 18 and over.

99.6% of residents lived in urban areas, while 0.4% lived in rural areas.

There were 12,834 households in Plainfield, of which 33.0% had children under the age of 18 living in them. Of all households, 48.5% were married-couple households, 17.7% were households with a male householder and no spouse or partner present, and 27.0% were households with a female householder and no spouse or partner present. About 28.6% of all households were made up of individuals and 12.2% had someone living alone who was 65 years of age or older.

There were 13,512 housing units, of which 5.0% were vacant. The homeowner vacancy rate was 1.0% and the rental vacancy rate was 7.1%.

Racial composition as of the 2020 census
Race	Number	Percent
White	27,080	78.2%
Black or African American	3,147	9.1%
American Indian and Alaska Native	81	0.2%
Asian	1,498	4.3%
Native Hawaiian and Other Pacific Islander	6	0.0%
Some other race	719	2.1%
Two or more races	2,094	6.0%
Hispanic or Latino (of any race)	1,710	4.9%

=== 2010 census ===
As of the census of 2010, there were 27,631 people, 9,747 households, and 6,756 families residing in the town. The population density was 1,240.7 inhabitants per square mile (479.0/km^{2}). There were 10,386 housing units at an average density of 466.4 per square mile (180.1/km^{2}). The racial makeup of the town was 85.7% White, 7.8% African American, 0.1% Native American, 3.2% Asian, 1.4% from other races, and 1.7% from two or more races. Hispanic or Latino of any race were 3.9% of the population.

There were 9,747 households, of which 37.1% had children under the age of 18 living with them, 52.0% were married couples living together, 12.3% had a female householder with no husband present, 5.0% had a male householder with no wife present, and 30.7% were non-families. 25.7% of all households were made up of individuals, and 8.7% had someone living alone who was 65 years of age or older. The average household size was 2.57 and the average family size was 3.08.

The median age in the town was 35.5 years. 24.5% of residents were under the age of 18; 9% were between the ages of 18 and 24; 30.9% were from 25 to 44; 24.3% were from 45 to 64; and 11.3% were 65 years of age or older. The gender makeup of the town was 52.8% male and 47.2% female.

== Economy ==
A 1,033-acre (418 ha) warehouse district on the east side of Plainfield, close to Indianapolis International Airport, employs around 5,000 people which is roughly 50 percent of all warehouse jobs in central Indiana.

"The Shops at Perry Crossing" is a 600,000-square-foot (56,000 m^{2}) open-air retail mall.

The Plainfield Correctional Facility of the Indiana Department of Correction is in the western part of Plainfield. As of 2019, the prison housed 1,497 inmates, and employed 341 staff.

== Arts and culture ==
The town has a lending library, the Plainfield-Guilford Township Public Library.

The Hendricks County Bridge Number 316, Plainfield Historic District, and THI and E Interurban Depot-Substation are listed on the National Register of Historic Places.

== Parks and recreation ==
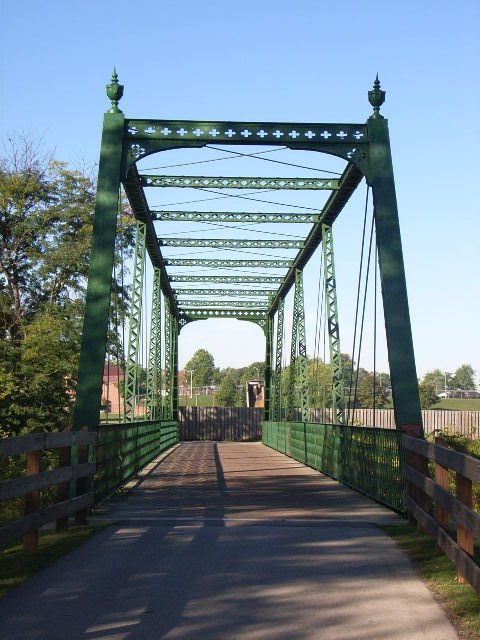
Restored truss bridge along the White Lick Creek Trail in Plainfield

Plainfield maintains approximately 20 miles (32 km) of trails in the town. The 4.6 miles (7.4 km) eastern segment of the Vandalia Trail contains re-purposed portions of the former Vandalia Railroad.

The Richard A. Carlucci Recreation and Aquatic Center is 11,300 square feet (1,050 m^{2}) and includes basketball courts, an indoor walk/run track, a waterpark, a fitness center, indoor play area.

Hummel Park is a 205-acre (83 ha) park that features sports venues, basketball and volleyball courts, baseball diamonds, nature trails, fishing lakes, an amphitheater, and a 300-foot (91 m) wooden bridge across White Lick Creek.

== Education ==
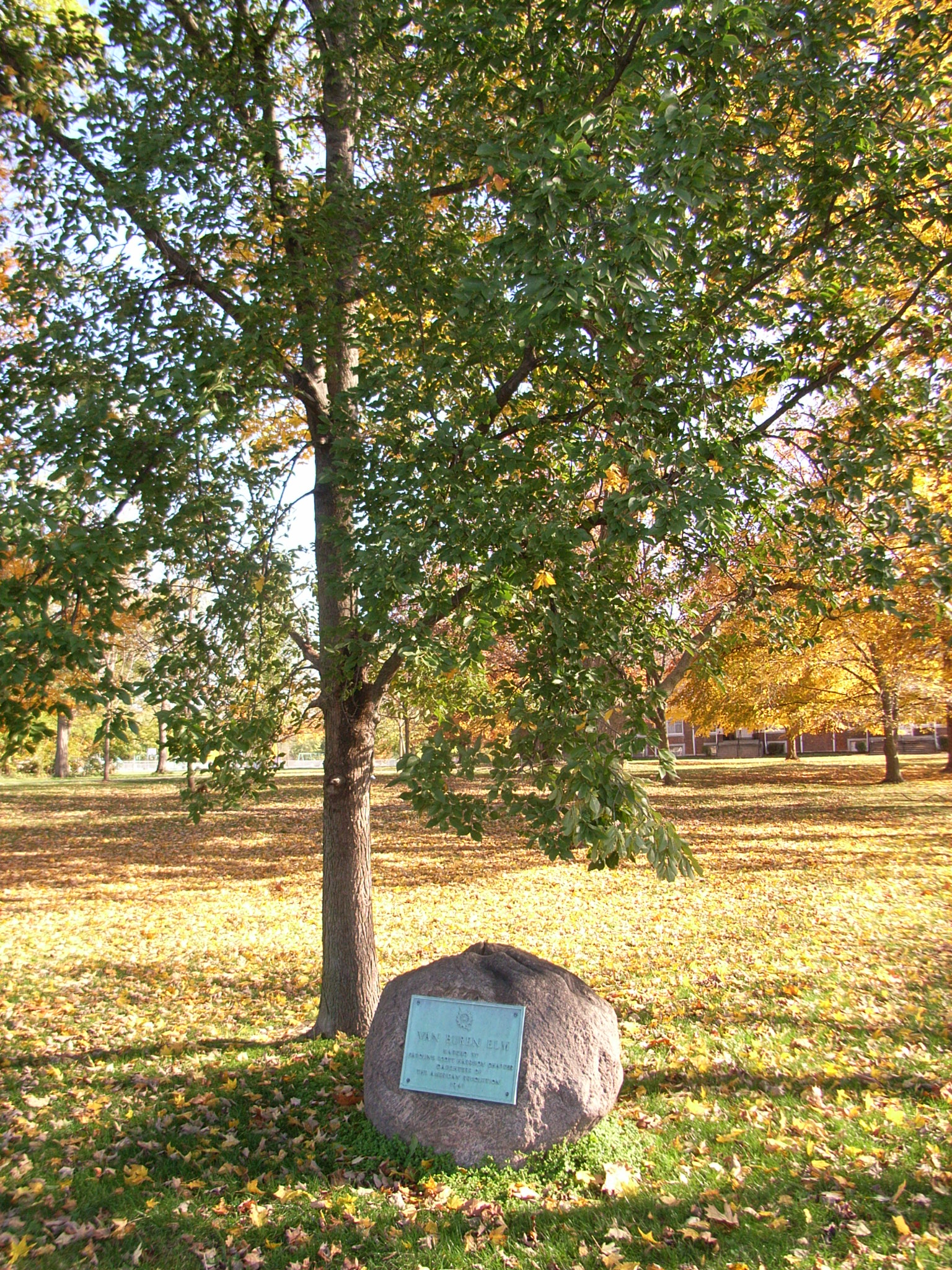
The site of the Van Buren Elm

=== Higher education ===
Plainfield is home to an Ivy Tech Community College satellite location that is associated with the Indianapolis main campus.

=== K-12 schools ===
The vast majority of Plainfield is in the Plainfield Community School Corporation. The schools under this body include:

- Guilford Elementary School
- Brentwood Elementary School
- Central Elementary School
- Van Buren Elementary School
- Clarks Creek Elementary School
- Plainfield Community Middle School
- Plainfield High School

Some portions of Plainfield extend into the Avon Community School Corporation and the Mill Creek Community School Corporation. The Avon district operates Avon High School and the Mill Creek district operates Cascade High School.

=== Private school systems ===
Private schools in Plainfield include St. Susanna Catholic School, which is run by St. Susanna Catholic Church of Plainfield.

== Infrastructure ==
=== Transportation ===
==== Transit ====
The Central Indiana Regional Transportation Authority operates a commuter bus serving major employers in the town.

==== Highways ====
- Interstate 70 - I-70 runs east to west along the southern edge of Plainfield.
- US 40 - also known as the Historic National Road and the Cumberland Road, US 40 passes through the middle of Plainfield and is the main arterial route running east to west in the town. Plainfield's town center is situated around the intersection of US 40 and Center Street, also known as Old State Highway 267.
- State Road 267 (former) - Plainfield's primary north to south arterial is Quaker Boulevard, formerly SR 267.
- Ronald Reagan Parkway - This route is a secondary north to south arterial on Plainfield's east side.

==== Airports ====
Indianapolis International Airport is located immediately east of Plainfield. Hendricks County Airport is 5 mi (8.0 km) northwest of Plainfield.

== Notable people ==
- William Temple Hornaday, nineteenth-century conservationist, was born in Plainfield.
- Mark Hampton, notable interior designer, was from Plainfield.
- Del Harris, basketball coach, was raised in Plainfield.
- Lawson Harvey, Justice of the Indiana Supreme Court
- James Hurst, retired offensive lineman who played for the Baltimore Ravens and New Orleans Saints.
- Ron McQueeney, director of photography at Indianapolis Motor Speedway, was raised in Plainfield.
- Chris Stout, founding director of the Center for Global Initiatives, graduated from Plainfield High School.
- Forrest Tucker, actor, was born in Plainfield.
- Patricia "Pat" Williams known as "Ms. Pat", comedian, moved to Plainfield in 2006
- Babar and Haris Suleman Pakistani-American father-son pilot duo, buried at Maple Hill Cemetery in 2014
