= James P. Hughes =

American judge (1874–1961)

Justice of Indiana Supreme Court
- In office January 3, 1933 – January 3, 1939
- Preceded by: Clarence R. Martin
- Succeeded by: Hardress N. Swaim

Personal details
- Born: December 18, 1874 Vigo County, Indiana, U.S.
- Died: August 30, 1961 (aged 86) Greencastle, Indiana, U.S.
- Party: Republican
- Education: DePauw University; Indiana University (JD)

James Peter Hughes (December 18, 1874 – August 30, 1961) was a justice of the Indiana Supreme Court from January 3, 1933, to January 1, 1939.

== Biography ==
Born in Vigo County, Indiana, Hughes attended DePauw University and the Indiana University Maurer School of Law.

In 1911, Governor Thomas R. Marshall appointed Hughes as the first judge to serve on the newly established 64th Indiana judicial circuit, encompassing Putnam County, Indiana. Hughes served in that capacity until his election to the Indiana Supreme Court in 1932, for which he took office in January 1933. He declined to run for re-election in 1938, and instead accepted a posting as an assistant attorney general of the state, working under Omer Stokes Jackson. He later resumed the practice of law in Greencastle, Indiana. From 1942 to 1943, Hughes served on a federal railway strike panel.

Hughes died at his country home near Greencastle, Indiana.

Political offices
Preceded by Clarence R. Martin	Justice of the Indiana Supreme Court; 1933–1939	Succeeded by Hardress Nathaniel Swaim
