= National Register of Historic Places listings in Hendricks County, Indiana =

Location of Hendricks County in Indiana

This is a list of the National Register of Historic Places listings in Hendricks County, Indiana.

This is intended to be a complete list of the properties and districts on the National Register of Historic Places in Hendricks County, Indiana, United States. Latitude and longitude coordinates are provided for many National Register properties and districts; these locations may be seen together in a map.

There are 20 properties and districts listed on the National Register in the county, and two former listings.

Properties and districts located in incorporated areas display the name of the municipality, while properties and districts in unincorporated areas display the name of their civil township. Properties and districts split between multiple jurisdictions display the names of all jurisdictions.

This National Park Service list is complete through NPS recent listings posted August 29, 2025.

== Current listings ==
	Name on the Register	Image	Date listed	Location	City or town	Description
1	Ora Adams House	Ora Adams House	June 17, 2009 (#09000425)	301-303 E. Main St. 39°45′39″N 86°31′13″W	Danville	
2	Amo THI & E Interurban Depot/Substation	Amo THI & E Interurban Depot/Substation	January 25, 2007 (#06001294)	4985 Railroad St. 39°41′18″N 86°36′48″W	Amo	
3	Forest W. and Jeannette Wales Blanton House	Forest W. and Jeannette Wales Blanton House	September 12, 2016 (#16000612)	625 N. Washington St. 39°46′14″N 86°31′23″W	Danville	
4	Leander Campbell House	Leander Campbell House	September 28, 2003 (#03000981)	498 E. Broadway St. 39°45′29″N 86°30′58″W	Danville	
5	Danville Courthouse Square Historic District	Danville Courthouse Square Historic District	December 27, 2010 (#02001559)	Roughly bounded by Clinton, Tennessee, Broadway, and Cross Sts. 39°45′37″N 86°31′26″W	Danville	
6	Danville Main Street Historic District	Danville Main Street Historic District	September 8, 1994 (#94001109)	Bounded by East, Main, Cross, and Marion Sts. 39°45′37″N 86°31′42″W	Danville	
7	Dr. Jeremiah and Ann Jane DePew House	Dr. Jeremiah and Ann Jane DePew House	September 20, 2006 (#06000850)	292 E. Broadway St. 39°45′33″N 86°31′14″W	Danville	
8	Hendricks County Bridge Number 316	Hendricks County Bridge Number 316	March 26, 2003 (#03000140)	Center Rd., Friendship Gardens over White Lick Creek; 39°41′47″N 86°24′07″W	Plainfield	
9	Hendricks County Jail and Sheriff's Residence	Hendricks County Jail and Sheriff's Residence	June 30, 1983 (#83000125)	170 S. Washington St. 39°45′32″N 86°31′27″W	Danville	
10	Hendricks County Poor Asylum		December 3, 2018 (#100003181)	865 E. Main St. 39°45′28″N 86°30′18″W	Center Township	
11	Joel Jessup Farm	Joel Jessup Farm	August 14, 1998 (#98001049)	County Road 800S near County Road 1050E, northwest of Friendswood; 39°38′44″N 86°20′09″W	Guilford Township	
12	Noah and Hannah Hadley Kellum House	Noah and Hannah Hadley Kellum House	March 3, 1995 (#95000204)	7290 S. County Road 1050E, northwest of Friendswood; 39°39′25″N 86°20′11″W	Guilford Township	
13	John W. McClain House	John W. McClain House	June 22, 2004 (#04000633)	1445 S. County Road 525E, southwest of Avon; 39°44′59″N 86°25′44″W	Washington Township	
14	McCormack-Bowman House	McCormack-Bowman House	March 20, 1995 (#95000200)	County Road 200W, 0.5 miles south of its junction with U.S. Route 40 and southwest of Clayton; 39°38′50″N 86°33′37″W	Franklin Township	
15	A.A. Parsons Farmstead	A.A. Parsons Farmstead	September 30, 2014 (#14000803)	1739 S625E; 39°44′14″N 86°25′10″W	Washington Township	
16	Plainfield Historic District	Plainfield Historic District	March 31, 2010 (#10000121)	Roughly bounded by Lincoln St to the north; S. East St. to the east; Ash St. to the south; and S. Mill St to the west 39°42′11″N 86°24′09″W	Plainfield	
17	Sugar Grove Meetinghouse and Cemetery	Sugar Grove Meetinghouse and Cemetery	September 22, 2000 (#00001137)	Junction of County Roads 700E and 600S; 39°40′29″N 86°24′01″W	Guilford Township	
18	THI and E Interurban Depot-Substation	THI and E Interurban Depot-Substation	December 19, 2002 (#02001562)	401 S. Vine St. 39°42′01″N 86°24′01″W	Plainfield	
19	Twin Bridges	Twin Bridges	March 15, 2000 (#00000200)	County Road 150E over White Lick Creek; 39°45′15″N 86°30′15″W	Danville	
20	Wilson-Courtney House	Wilson-Courtney House	February 9, 1984 (#84001044)	10 Cartersburg Rd. 39°45′10″N 86°31′14″W	Danville	

== Former listings ==
	Name on the Register	Image	Date listed	Date removed	Location	City or town	Description
1	Kellum-Jessup-Chandler Farm	Kellum-Jessup-Chandler Farm	September 8, 1994 (#94001111)	November 15, 2021	6726 S. White Lick Creek Rd., southeast of Plainfield; 39°39′55″N 86°20′36″W	Guilford Township	
2	Smith Farm	Smith Farm	December 19, 2007 (#07001279)	December 7, 2023	2698 S. County Road 900E, northeast of Plainfield; 39°43′34″N 86°21′42″W	Washington Township	

== See also ==
- List of National Historic Landmarks in Indiana
- National Register of Historic Places listings in Indiana
- Listings in neighboring counties: Boone, Marion, Montgomery, Morgan, Putnam
- List of Indiana state historical markers in Hendricks County
