= List of Indiana state historical markers in Hendricks County =

Location of Hendricks County in Indiana

This is a list of the Indiana state historical markers in Hendricks County.

This is intended to be a complete list of the official state historical markers placed in Hendricks County, Indiana, United States by the Indiana Historical Bureau. The locations of the historical markers and their latitude and longitude coordinates are included below when available, along with their names, years of placement, and topics as recorded by the Historical Bureau. There are 7 historical markers located in Hendricks County.

== Historical markers ==
Marker title	Image	Year placed	Location	Topics
Western Yearly Meeting House		1972	Junction of U.S. Route 40/National Road and State Road 267 in Plainfield; 39°42′13.5″N 86°23′58″W	Religion, Education
Danville's Main Street Historic District		2000	256-260 W. Main Street (U.S. Route 36) in Danville; 39°45′38.4″N 86°31′42″W	Historic District, Neighborhoods, and Towns, Buildings and Architecture
Danville's Carnegie Library		2001	101 S. Indiana Street in Danville; 39°45′34.8″N 86°31′21″W	Carnegie Library
Central Normal College		2001	Junction of Main (U.S. Route 36) and Wayne Streets in Danville; 39°45′39″N 86°31′13″W	Education, Religion
Samuel Luther Thompson		2006	Ellis Park at 600 E. Main Street in Danville; 39°45′38″N 86°30′54″W	Sports
Arthur L. Trester		2007	Junction of Pearl and Railroad Streets in Amo; 39°41′17″N 86°36′49″W	Sports
Adrian A. Parsons, 1846-1929 / Indiana’s Soybean Pioneer		2017	Southwest corner of the intersection of County Road 150 S and County Road 625, Avon; 39°44′25″N 86°24′51″W	Agriculture, Industry

== See also ==
- List of Indiana state historical markers
- National Register of Historic Places listings in Hendricks County, Indiana
