= Hannah T. Pratt =

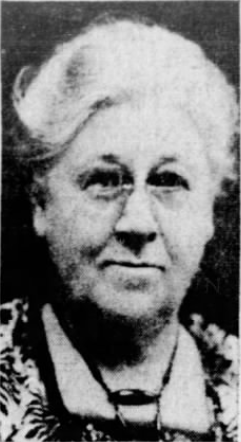
Hannah T. Pratt, 1939

Hannah T. Pratt (July 12, 1854 - January 11, 1939) was an evangelist.

== Early life ==
Hannah T. Pratt was born in Brooks, Maine, on July 12, 1854. She was the daughter of Joseph H. Pratt (1816-1890) and Martha E. Pratt (1817-1907). Her father was a minister in the Friends' Church for over forty years. Her mother was an earnest christian worker. Pratt was a born preacher. She was remarkably converted when but four years of age. When six years old, she felt impressed to preach the gospel. When eleven years old, in a public audience, she was much wrought upon for service, but she did not yield until she was fourteen years of age. At a large convention in Newport, Rhode Island, for the first time she addressed a public audience.

Pratt was educated in the common schools and in the Friends' College in Providence, Rhode Island.

== Career ==
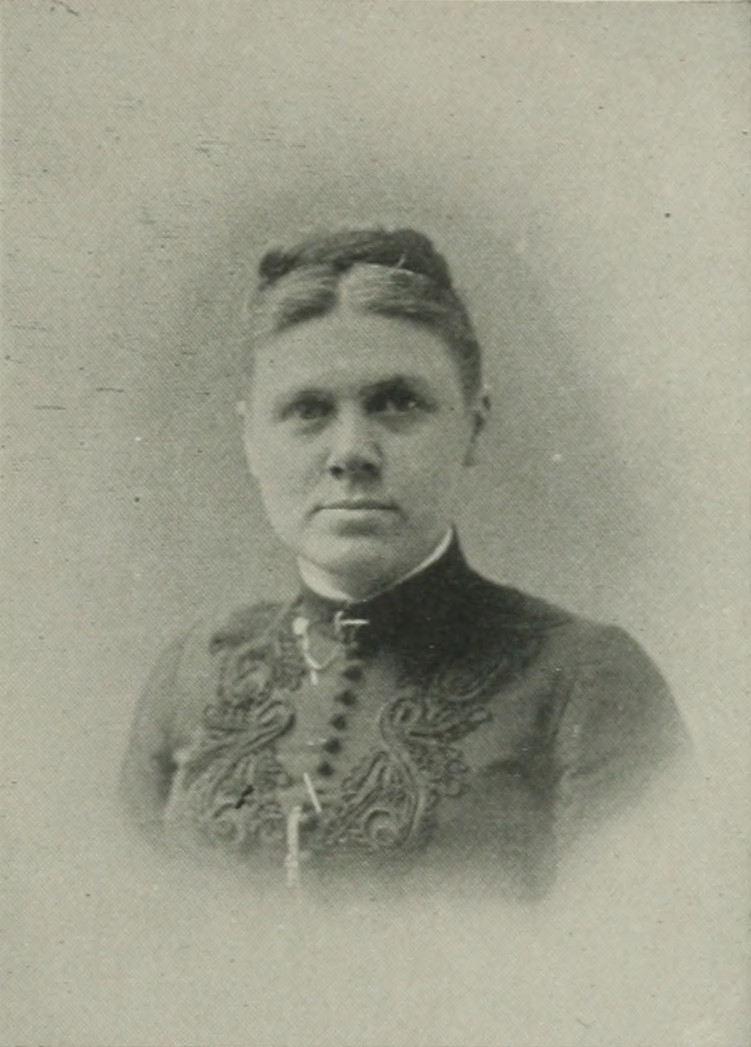
Hannah T. Pratt, A woman of the century (page 597 crop)

When nineteen years of age, Hannah T. Pratt stepped into public fields, laboring for a time in temperance work with the Woman's Christian Temperance Union in New Hampshire. Through her lectures before that organization and the Young Men's Reform Club her fame spread, and calls were made for her to lecture in various parts of the State.

Convinced that her special duty was in the line of the ministry, she commenced a missionary tour through the State and into Canada, having many conversions to seal her ministry. In 1876 she went to New York City and addressed large audiences. Invitations from leading evangelists continued to be given for her to enter wider fields. In 1885 she accompanied Mrs. Hoag, of Canada, on an evangelistic tour in New England and New York, having marked success. The following spring she accepted a pastorate in Vermont, which she held two years. In 1886 she was engaged in gospel work in Ohio, Iowa and Indiana, preaching to large audiences with remarkable effect.

In 1887 she was ordained by the Friends' Church and received credentials of their high esteem to labor with all denominations and in any field. In 1888 she returned to Augusta, Maine, with her aged parents. In the opera house of that city she conducted one of the most remarkable revivals ever known in the State. Having organized several churches in Maine and New York. she traveled more extensively in the States and Provinces, visiting refuges for the fallen, alms-houses and prisons, preaching in camp-meetings and before Young Men's Christian Associations, and conducting revival services with nearly all denominations.

On January 23, 1889, she accepted a call to officiate as chaplain in the Senate Chamber of Augusta, an honor never before conferred upon a woman.

== Personal life ==
On September 7, 1893, Hannah T. Pratt married Charles L. Jessup (1865-1938), minister of Fairfield, Indiana, and later an outstanding civic leader and distinguished citizen of Brownsville, Texas.

She died on January 11, 1939, and is buried with her husband at Fairfield Friends Cemetery, Friendswood, Indiana.
