= Danville School District =

Danville School District may refer to:

- Danville School District (Arkansas), located in Danville, Arkansas.
- Danville School District No. 118, in Danville, Illinois
- Danville Community School Corporation, located in Danville, Indiana.
- Danville Schools, located in Danville, Kentucky.
- Danville Local Schools, located in Danville, Ohio.
- Danville Area School District, located in Danville, Pennsylvania.
- Danville School District (Vermont), located in Danville, Vermont.
