= Danville Community High School =

Location
- 100 Warrior Way; Danville, Hendricks County, Indiana 46122; United States; 39°45′25″N 86°32′24″W

Information
- Type: Public high school
- Established: 1963
- School district: Danville Community School Corporation
- Principal: PJ Hamann
- Teaching staff: 44.50 (FTE)
- Grades: 9-12
- Enrollment: 826 (2023-2024)
- Student to teacher ratio: 18.56
- Campus size: 3A (IHSAA)
- Colors: Crimson and Grey
- Team name: Warrior
- Rival: Tri-West High School
- Website: Official Website

Danville Community High School (DCHS) is a public high school located in Danville, Indiana. DCHS enrolls students from grades nine through twelve and is operated by the Danville Community School Corporation. Danville is part of the Sagamore Conference (IHSAA). The school's mascot is the Warriors, and the school colors are crimson and gray.

The vast majority of Danville is in the school district.

== Demographics ==
802 students were enrolled at DCHS for the 2017–2018 school year. 91.9% are white, 1.4% are black, 1.5% are Hispanic, 1.6% are Asian and 3.4% are multiracial. 18.2% of students qualify for free lunches and 7.7% qualify for reduced price lunches.

== Academics ==
All benchmarks are for the 2016–2017 school year.

- ACT Composite Score: 23
- SAT Composite Score: 1101
- Graduation Rate: 92.2%

== Notable alumni ==
- Doug Boles, President, Indianapolis Motor Speedway and INDYCAR.
- John Cravens, registrar of Indiana University from 1895 to 1936.
- John Groce, current head coach of the Akron Zips men's basketball team.
- Connie Lawson, 61st Secretary of State of Indiana
- Dick Passwater, NASCAR / USAC Stock Car driver
- Bob Snyder, musician known for playing tenor sax, alto sax, clarinet, and flute.
- Travis Steele, current head coach of the Miami RedHawks men's basketball team.
- Jordan Weidner, professional basketball player.

== See also ==
- List of high schools in Indiana
