= West Newton, Indiana =

Neighborhood in Indianapolis, Indiana, US

Coordinates: 39°39′11″N 86°16′58″W

West Newton, Indiana is a neighborhood located in southwestern Indianapolis, Indiana, United States. West Newton is situated ten miles (16 km) southwest of downtown Indianapolis in south central Decatur Township. It originated as a small Quaker-settled town. It has been incorporated into Indianapolis. The ZIP Code for West Newton is 46183.

== History ==
West Newton was laid out by Christopher Furnas in April 1851, in the south half of the township. The West Newton Station on the Indianapolis and Vincennes Railroad was established sometime after construction of that line in 1865. West Newton Lodge 452 was chartered on May 27, 1873. By the early 1880s the town had two churches (Friends and Methodist), a two-story school house, a graded school, two physicians, a post office, two general stores, two blacksmiths, a wagon maker shop, an undertaker shop, and a sawmill.

== See also ==
- List of neighborhoods in Indianapolis
