= White Lick Creek =

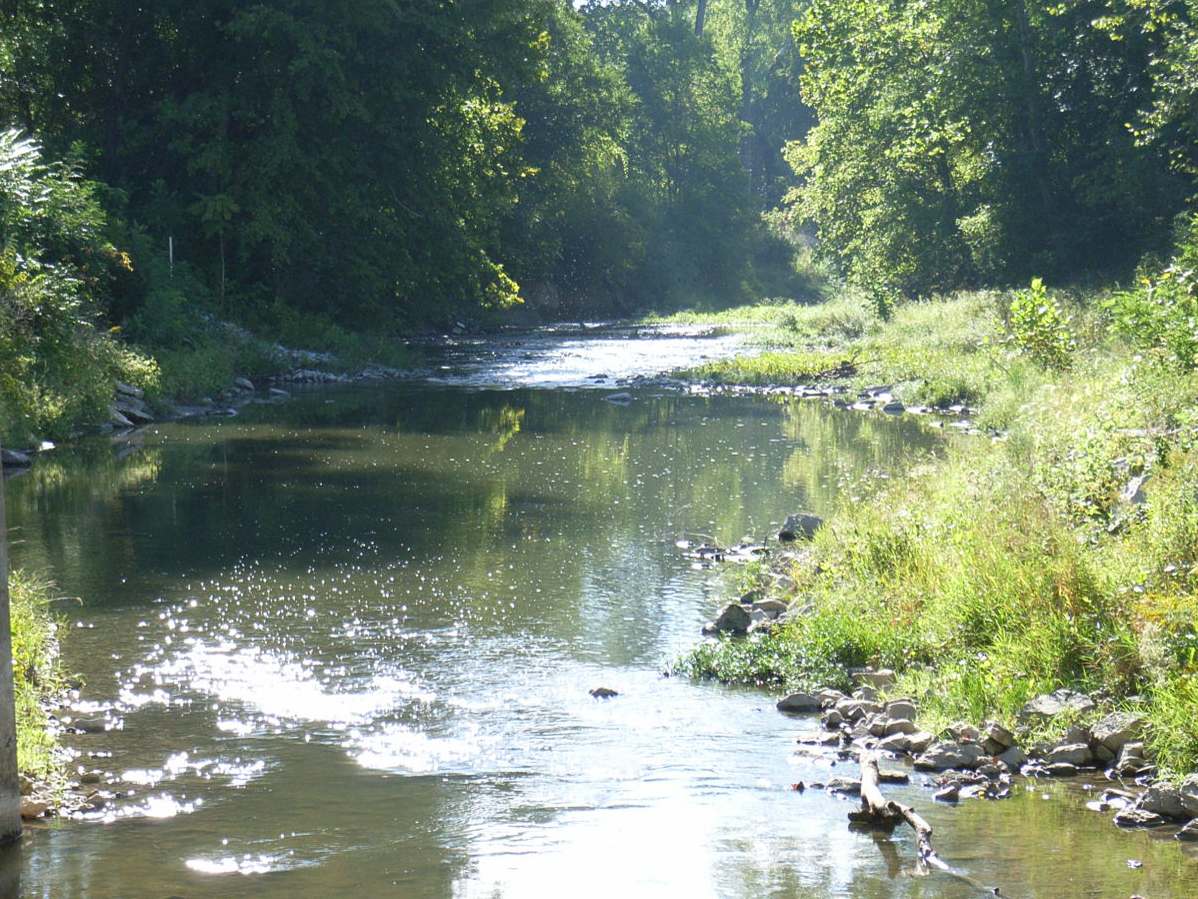
- White Lick Creek in Plainfield, Indiana

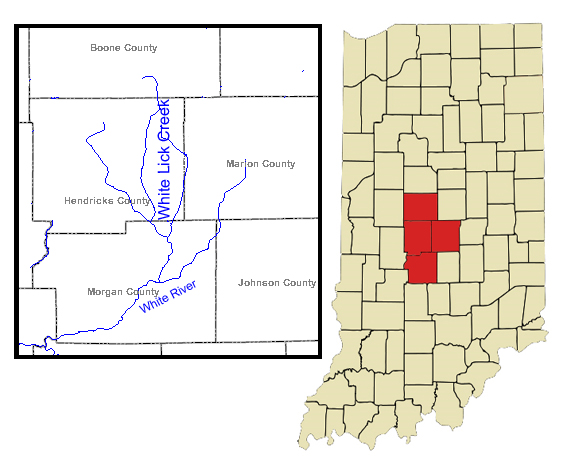
- Map of White Lick Creek
- Etymology: “Wa-pe-ke-way” or “White Salt”

Location
- Country: United States
- State: Indiana
- Region: Central Indiana
- District: Boone County; Hendricks County; Morgan County
- Municipality: Fayette; Brownsburg; Plainfield; Mooresville; Martinsville

Physical characteristics
- Source
  - location: Fayette, Indiana, United States
  - coordinates: 39°58′23″N 86°25′22″W
- Mouth
  - location: Centerton, Indiana, United States
  - coordinates: 39°29′35″N 86°23′20″W
- Discharge
  - location: Mooresville, Indiana
  - average: 244 cu/ft. per sec.

Basin features
- River system: White River (West Fork)
- Tributaries
  - left: Abner Creek; West Fork White Lick Creek; McCracken Creek
  - right: Clarks Creek; East Fork White Lick Creek

White Lick Creek is a 47.7-mile-long (76.8 km) stream in central Indiana in the United States. It flows from its source in Boone County, near Fayette, into the White River near Centerton.

== Name ==
White Lick Creek is named for a mineral lick which attracted deer. In the past the stream had various names: East Lick Creek, White Lick River, Whitelick Creek and Whitelick River.

== Haunted White Lick Creek Bridge ==
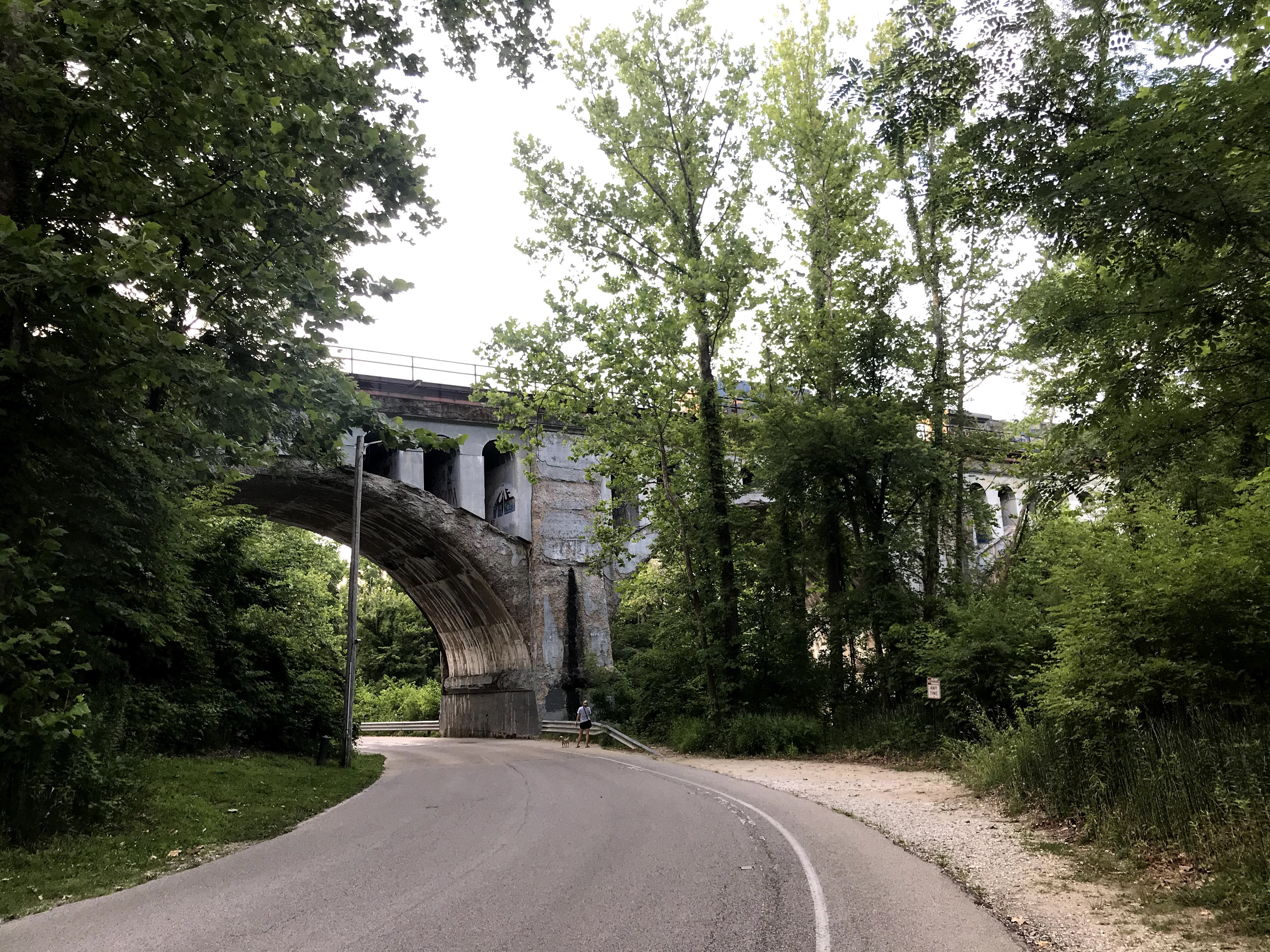
Haunted White Lick Creek Bridge

According to an urban legend, just south of U.S. Highway 36 between Danville and Avon, there is a railroad bridge that is haunted by the ghost of an Irish immigrant. "Dad" Jones was hired to help build a former bridge that once stood. During the construction he died brutally, and it is said that his spirit still occupies the area.

As legend goes, the work had progressed up to the point when the workers were pouring concrete into wooden frames. One day "Dad" Jones was on a wooden platform above a framework that was being filled when all of sudden the platform broke. His fellow workers had to helplessly watch "Dad" Jones sink deeper and deeper into the concrete. It is said that the workers could hear him pounding his fists against the sides of the framework until he finally suffocated.

The construction company and co-workers were puzzled as to what to do with his remains. The company eventually made the decision it would more economic and also too difficult to remove his body from the dried concrete block. Even though his co-workers refused to continue to build the bridge with his body located inside, the company pushed for the construction to be finished.

Years after the completion of the bridge, locals reported they could still screams and pounding coming from a specific concrete pylon. Eventually the original bridge was torn down, and a new bridge was built. The remains of the old bridge can be found near the new one. Still today locals say they can hear screams and pounding coming from the bridge.

== See also ==
- List of rivers of Indiana
- Hendricks County Bridge Number 316
- Twin Bridges (Danville, Indiana)
