= Six Points, Hendricks County, Indiana =

- Unincorporated community
- Location within Indiana Location within the United States
- Coordinates: 39°43′34″N 86°20′09″W
- Country: United States
- State: Indiana
- County: Hendricks
- Township: Washington
- Elevation: 771 ft (235 m)
- ZIP code: 46231
- FIPS code: 18-69966
- GNIS feature ID: 443558

Six Points is an unincorporated community in Washington Township, Hendricks County, Indiana. Its name refers to the junction of two streets and a railroad.

== Geography ==
Six Points is located at 39°43′34″N 86°20′09″W.
