= Guilford Township, Hendricks County, Indiana =

Guilford Township
- Township
- Flag Logo

- Location in Hendricks County
- Coordinates: 39°40′28″N 86°22′56″W
- Country: United States
- State: Indiana
- County: Hendricks

Government
  - Type: Indiana township

Area
  - Total: 35.93 sq mi (93.06 km^{2})
  - Land: 35.80 sq mi (92.72 km^{2})
  - Water: 0.13 sq mi (0.34 km^{2}) 0.37%
- Elevation: 725 ft (221 m)

Population (2020)
  - Total: 33,797
  - Density: 778/sq mi (300.3/km^{2})
- Time zone: UTC-5 (Eastern (EST))
  - Summer (DST): UTC-4 (EDT)
- GNIS feature ID: 453358
- Website: guilfordtownship.com

Guilford Township is one of twelve townships in Hendricks County, Indiana, United States. As of the 2010 census, its population was 27,844.

== History ==
Guilford was the first settled township in Hendricks County. In 1820 Samuel Herriman, James Dunn, Bat Ramsey, Harris Bay, John W. Bryant, and George Moore settled on White Lick Creek near the Morgan County line. Many of the first settlers to arrive in the township were Quakers from Guilford County, North Carolina, and named the township after their old home.

The Joel Jessup Farm, Noah and Hannah Hadley Kellum House, Kellum-Jessup-Chandler Farm, and Sugar Grove Meetinghouse and Cemetery are listed on the National Register of Historic Places.

An unnamed Black settlement existed in Guilford Township beginning in the 19th century. Several black families lived in the area between Plainfield and Mooresville and established a non-denominational church along White Lick Creek, as well as a colored school before 1870.

== Geography ==
Guilford Township covers an area of 35.93 square miles (93.1 km^{2}); of this, 0.13 square miles (0.34 km^{2}) or 0.37 percent is water. The streams of Black Creek, Clarks Creek, Guilford Branch, Hendricks Creek, Leg Creek, Middle Creek, Moore Creek, Penns Run, Rail Run, Rock Creek, Rogers Creek and West Fork Hendricks Creek run through this township.

=== Cities and towns ===
- Plainfield (vast majority)

=== Unincorporated towns ===
- Friendswood

(This list is based on USGS data and may include former settlements.)

=== Adjacent townships ===
- Washington Township (north)
- Wayne Township, Marion County (northeast)
- Decatur Township, Marion County (east)
- Madison Township, Morgan County (southeast)
- Brown Township, Morgan County (south)
- Monroe Township, Morgan County (southwest)
- Liberty Township (west)

=== Cemeteries ===
The township contains three active cemeteries: Maple Hill, Sugar Grove and Fairfield Friends. There are four historical cemeteries in the township that have been moved or are no longer in use: the Indiana Boys' School, Lick Branch, Ramsey Family, and White Lick Friends.

=== Major highways ===
- Interstate 70
- U.S. Route 40
- State Road 67
- State Road 267

== Education ==
Guilford Township residents may obtain a free library card from the Plainfield-Guilford Township Public Library in Plainfield.
