= John Cravens =

John W. Cravens (October 1, 1864 – August 10, 1937) was the Registrar of Indiana University from 1895 to 1936, and a member of the Indiana House of Representatives.

== Early life ==
Cravens was born in Center Valley, Indiana. He was one of seven children of William and Sarah Cravens. Cravens began his education in the country schools in Hendricks County before moving to Danville, Indiana. In Danville he attended Danville Community High School. In 1884 he graduated with a BS from Central Indiana Normal College in Danville.

== Career ==
Cravens co-founded the Danville Gazette with W.A. King in 1884, which made him the youngest newspaper editor in the state. In 1885 he left Danville for Bloomington, and Cravens began to focus on working to improve Bloomington. In 1876, he was made superintendent of Monroe County schools. John was elected clerk of Monroe County Circuit Court in 1890, and relinquished his job as superintendent.

In 1893, Cravens founded the newspaper, Bloomington World. He was editor of the World until 1906, when he sold the rights to his brother. In 1894, his term as court clerk ended, which allowed him to return to Indiana University as a student. He re-enrolled in Indiana University as an undergraduate in 1895. He was appointed Registrar by university president Joseph Swain that same year. Cravens also served as Secretary to the Board of Trustees from 1898 to 1936 and as Secretary to the University from 1915 to 1936.

Cravens was elected to the Indiana House of Representatives, representing Monroe County and Brown County, in 1898. He was elected as a member of the Democratic Party.

Cravens served as Registrar of Indiana University for forty-one years, until his retirement in 1936. At the end of his tenure he had served longer than any other Registrar at that time.

== Family life ==
Cravens was married on his birthday in 1891 to a Bloomington native, Emma Lucille Krueger. Cravens and Emma had one child, Ruth Ralston Cravens, born February 12, 1898. Emma died on February 20, 1898. Cravens married Mellie Parker Greene on June 28, 1916.

== Death and legacy ==
Cravens died in 1937 and his funeral was held in the Indiana Memorial Union at Indiana University. In 1959, North Hall was renamed John W. Cravens hall, which today is used as the Collins Living-Learning Center.
