= Holistic Image VIII =

Publica artwork sculpture in Danville, Indiana, U.S.

- Artist: Betty Gold
- Year: 1980
- Type: Steel
- Dimensions: 470 cm × 480 cm × 490 cm (186 in × 189 in × 193 in)
- Location: Formerly Indianapolis Museum of Art; Currently Danville, Indiana, United States; 39°45′39.31″N 86°31′11.9″W
- Owner: Town of Danville

Holistic Image VIII, is a public artwork by American sculptor Betty Gold (b. 1935), located in front of the Danville, Indiana Town Hall which is twenty miles (32 km) west of Indianapolis, United States. The sculpture is made of steel and is approximately 186 inches (4,700 mm) in height, 189 inches (4,800 mm) wide and 193 inches (4,900 mm) long. It weighs approximately 8,000 pounds. Completed in 1980, the sculpture was originally owned by the Indianapolis Museum of Art but was deaccessioned in 2009 and donated to the Town of Danville, Indiana.

== Description ==
Holistic Image VIII is a geometric abstract sculpture consisting of a triangle bisected by a pentagon shape with a C-shape cutout on the proper right side, and a curvilinear C-form intersecting proper left front face. Standing sixteen feet tall and sixteen feet wide, it was crafted from a single plate of 1-inch thick raw steel. The artist's monogram, a "G" with a "b" inside, appears on the proper right, back of the sculpture.

== Information ==
After being on display on the grounds of the Indianapolis Museum of Art for several decades, Holistic Image VIII was donated to the Town of Danville, Indiana in 2009. That same year, Danville relocated their Town Hall offices from next to the Hendricks County Courthouse at 147 W. Main Street to the former Danville Middle School at 49 N. Wayne Street. On March 24, 2010, Holistic Image VIII was placed in front of the new Town Hall building, where it is prominently visible upon entering the town of Danville on Rt. 36 / Main Street. The sculpture is known to town residents simply as "Betty."

Holistic Image VIII was donated to Danville along with another contemporary piece called Nimrod which is located in front of the old Town Hall building on Main Street. The Town of Danville explains that both sculptures "add flavor and interest to the Main Street corridor and demonstrate that our community is interested in expanding the historical, cultural, and creative knowledge of its citizens and visitors."
