= Friendswood, Indiana =

- Unincorporated community
- Location within Indiana Location within the United States
- Coordinates: 39°38′47″N 86°19′58″W
- Country: United States
- State: Indiana
- County: Hendricks
- Township: Guilford
- Elevation: 725 ft (221 m)
- ZIP code: 46113
- FIPS code: 18-26044
- GNIS feature ID: 434871

Friendswood is an unincorporated community in Guilford Township, Hendricks County, Indiana.

== History ==
Friendswood was a station and shipping point on the railroad. A post office was established at Friendswood in 1868, and remained in operation until it was discontinued in 1909. One source speculates the name may indicate the presence of Friends, or Quakers.
