= Danville, Indiana =

- Town
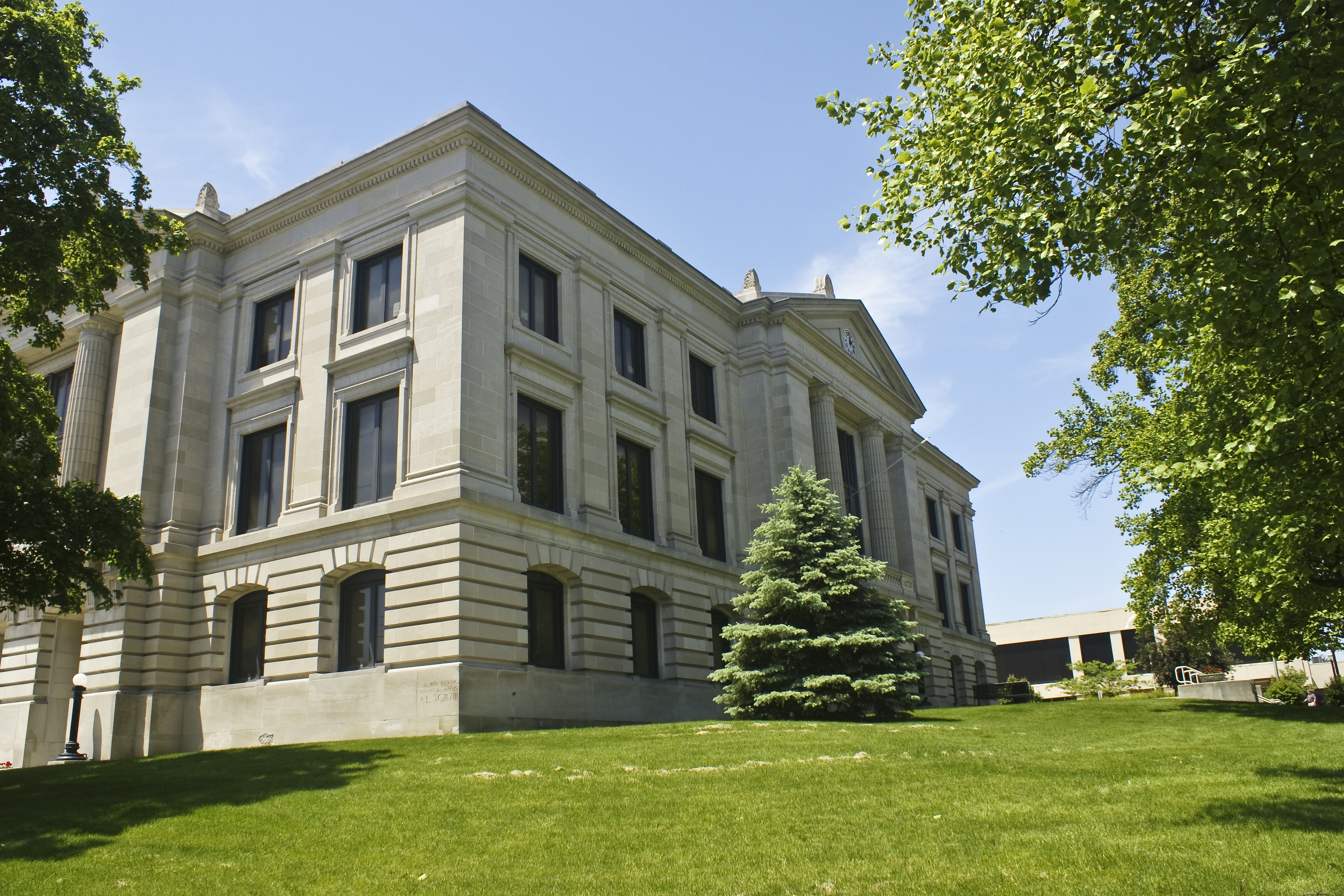
- Hendricks County Courthouse in Danville

- Flag Logo
- Motto: "A Great Place to Spend an Hour or a Lifetime"
- Location of Danville in Hendricks County, Indiana
- Coordinates: 39°45′05″N 86°29′44″W
- Country: United States
- State: Indiana
- County: Hendricks
- Townships: Center, Washington
- Founded: 1824
- Incorporated: 1835

Government
  - Town Manager: Mark Morgan
  - Assistant Town Manager: Will Lacey

Area
  - Total: 8.80 sq mi (22.80 km^{2})
  - Land: 8.75 sq mi (22.67 km^{2})
  - Water: 0.050 sq mi (0.13 km^{2})
- Elevation: 879 ft (268 m)

Population (2020)
  - Total: 10,559
  - Density: 1,206.5/sq mi (465.83/km^{2})
- Time zone: UTC-5 (EST)
  - Summer (DST): UTC-4 (EDT)
- ZIP code: 46122
- Area code: 317
- FIPS code: 18-16804
- GNIS feature ID: 2396678
- Website: danvillein.gov

Danville is a town in and the county seat of Hendricks County, Indiana, United States. The population was 10,559 at the 2020 census.

== History ==
Danville was founded in 1824, and its post office one year later. Danville was incorporated as a town in 1835.

The Ora Adams House, Leander Campbell House, Danville Courthouse Square Historic District, Danville Main Street Historic District, Dr. Jeremiah and Ann Jane DePew House, Hendricks County Jail and Sheriff's Residence, Twin Bridges, and Wilson-Courtney House are listed on the National Register of Historic Places.

== Geography ==
Danville is located at the center of Hendricks County. U.S. Route 36 is the town's Main Street, leading east 20 miles (32 km) to downtown Indianapolis and west 131 miles (211 km) to Decatur, Illinois. Indiana State Road 39 joins US-36 briefly in the center of town but leads north 9 miles (14 km) to Lizton and Interstate 74, and south 11 miles (18 km) to Center Valley and Interstate 70.

According to the 2010 census, Danville has a total area of 6.98 square miles (18.08 km^{2}), of which 6.93 square miles (17.95 km^{2}) (or 99.28%) is land and 0.05 square miles (0.13 km^{2}) (or 0.72%) is water. The West Fork of White Lick Creek, a tributary of the White River, flows north-to-south through the eastern side of the town.

=== Airport ===
- 2R2 – Hendricks County Airport

== Demographics ==
Historical population
Census	Pop.	Note	%±
1850	386		—
1860	895		131.9%
1870	1,040		16.2%
1880	1,598		53.7%
1890	1,569		−1.8%
1900	1,802		14.9%
1910	1,640		−9.0%
1920	1,729		5.4%
1930	1,930		11.6%
1940	2,093		8.4%
1950	2,802		33.9%
1960	3,287		17.3%
1970	3,771		14.7%
1980	4,220		11.9%
1990	4,345		3.0%
2000	6,418		47.7%
2010	9,001		40.2%
2020	10,559		17.3%
U.S. Decennial Census

=== 2020 census ===
As of the 2020 census, Danville had a population of 10,559. The median age was 36.4 years. 26.9% of residents were under the age of 18 and 15.0% of residents were 65 years of age or older. For every 100 females there were 91.9 males, and for every 100 females age 18 and over there were 90.0 males age 18 and over.

97.9% of residents lived in urban areas, while 2.1% lived in rural areas.

There were 3,962 households in Danville, of which 36.6% had children under the age of 18 living in them. Of all households, 53.4% were married-couple households, 13.8% were households with a male householder and no spouse or partner present, and 25.7% were households with a female householder and no spouse or partner present. About 24.3% of all households were made up of individuals and 11.4% had someone living alone who was 65 years of age or older.

There were 4,111 housing units, of which 3.6% were vacant. The homeowner vacancy rate was 0.8% and the rental vacancy rate was 4.9%.

Racial composition as of the 2020 census
Race	Number	Percent
White	9,658	91.5%
Black or African American	210	2.0%
American Indian and Alaska Native	23	0.2%
Asian	94	0.9%
Native Hawaiian and Other Pacific Islander	5	0.0%
Some other race	71	0.7%
Two or more races	498	4.7%
Hispanic or Latino (of any race)	242	2.3%

=== 2010 census ===
As of the census of 2010, there were 9,001 people, 3,344 households, and 2,398 families living in the town. The population density was 1,298.8 inhabitants per square mile (501.5/km^{2}). There were 3,589 housing units at an average density of 517.9 per square mile (200.0/km^{2}). The racial makeup of the town was 96.8% White, 0.8% African American, 0.2% Native American, 0.4% Asian, 0.4% from other races, and 1.4% from two or more races. Hispanic or Latino people of any race were 1.8% of the population.

There were 3,344 households, of which 41.2% had children under the age of 18 living with them, 55.4% were married couples living together, 11.9% had a female householder with no husband present, 4.3% had a male householder with no wife present, and 28.3% were non-families. 23.0% of all households were made up of individuals, and 10.1% had someone living alone who was 65 years of age or older. The average household size was 2.66 and the average family size was 3.14.

The median age in the town was 34.3 years. 29.3% of residents were under the age of 18; 7.6% were between the ages of 18 and 24; 28% were from 25 to 44; 23.3% were from 45 to 64; and 11.6% were 65 years of age or older. The gender makeup of the town was 48.5% male and 51.5% female.

=== 2000 census ===
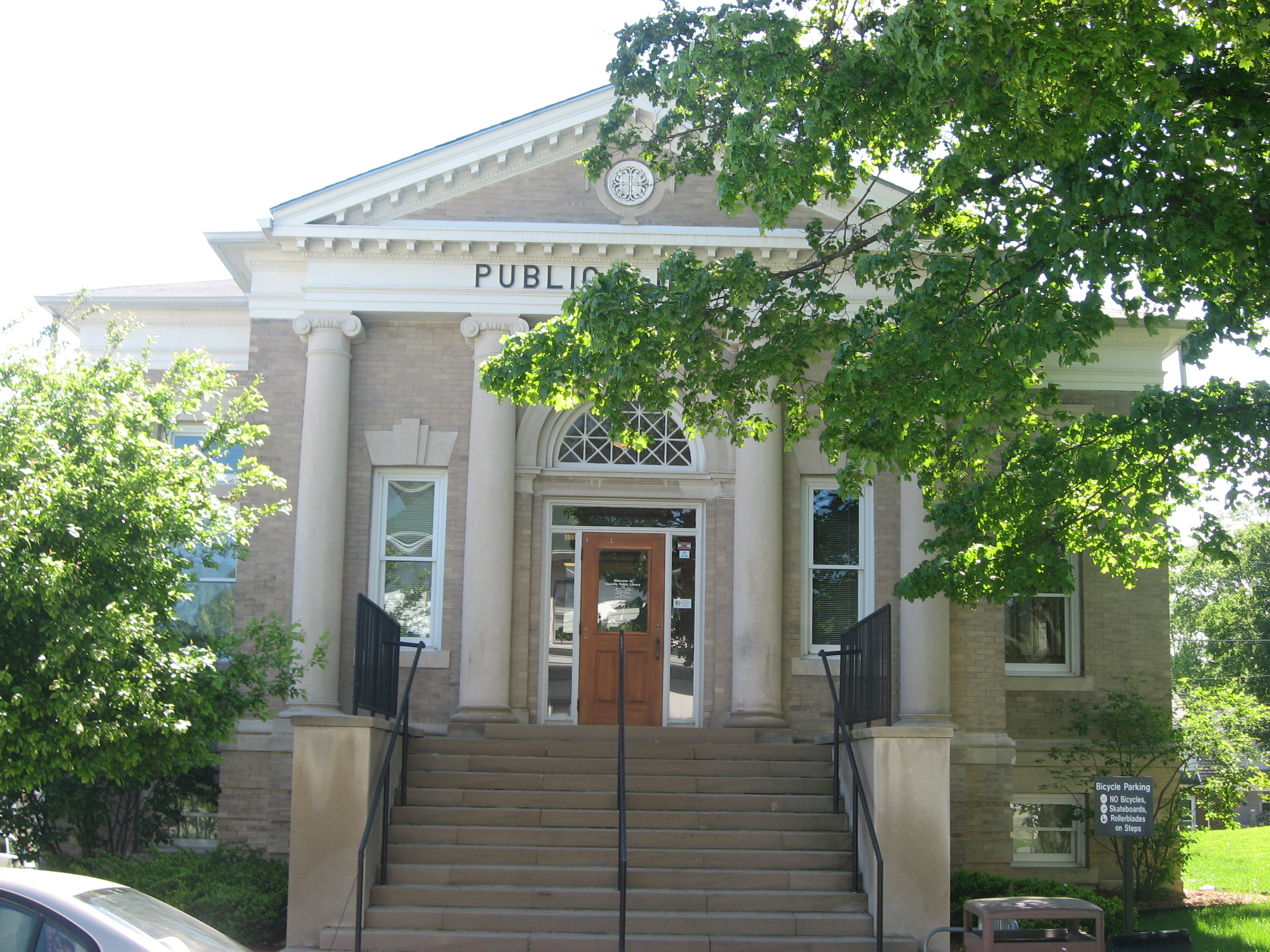
The Carnegie library in Danville

As of the census of 2000, there were 8,032 people, 2,350 households, and 1,670 families living in the town. The population density was 1,047.7 inhabitants per square mile (404.5/km^{2}). There were 2,506 housing units at an average density of 409.1 per square mile (158.0/km^{2}). The racial makeup of the town was 98.38% White, 0.34% African American, 0.22% Native American, 0.26% Asian, 0.02% Pacific Islander, 0.11% from other races, and 0.67% from two or more races. Hispanic or Latino people of any race were 1.06% of the population.

There were 2,350 households, out of which 37.6% had children under the age of 18 living with them, 58.7% were married couples living together, 8.7% had a female householder with no husband present, and 28.9% were non-families. 25.1% of all households were made up of individuals, and 12.5% had someone living alone who was 65 years of age or older. The average household size was 2.58 and the average family size was 3.11.

In the town, the population was spread out, with 27.6% under the age of 18, 8.4% from 18 to 24, 30.3% from 25 to 44, 20.0% from 45 to 64, and 13.8% who were 65 years of age or older. The median age was 35 years. For every 100 females there were 98.3 males. For every 100 females age 18 and over, there were 95.0 males.

The median income for a household in the town was $54,330, and the median income for a family was $62,813. Males had a median income of $40,724 versus $26,678 for females. The per capita income for the town was $22,209. About 2.1% of families and 2.5% of the population were below the poverty line, including 1.3% of those under age 18 and 7.7% of those age 65 or over.

== Arts and culture ==
=== Museums and other points of interest ===
The Hendricks County Historical Museum is located in the former Sheriff's Residence and Jail at 170 South Washington in Danville. The building was erected in 1866 and served as the county jail until 1974. The two-story brick structure, listed on the National Register of Historic Places, is the only surviving example of the Second Empire style of architecture in the county. This style was popular after the American Civil War and has as defining elements a central tower and mansard roof. The Museum's collection includes items relating to domestic life, agriculture, military history, education and other aspects of Hendricks county's heritage. It also includes items relating to the history of Indiana Central Normal College (later Canterbury College), which was located in Danville from 1878 until 1951.

=== Sports ===
Danville has been home to the Indiana Lyons of the American Basketball Association (ABA) since 2017. The team plays its home games at Bosstick Gymnasium within the Danville Athletic Club.

== Education ==
Danville Community School Corporation, the school district which includes the vast majority of Danville, operates Danville Community High School, a secondary school (grades 9 through 12) located just off of U.S. Route 36. The mascot of Danville Community Schools is a Warrior in American Indian clothing. The school colors are crimson and gray. Other facilities operated by the school corporation are:

- Danville Middle School
- South Elementary School
- North Elementary School
- Opportunity House

There is a small piece of Danville in the Avon Community School Corporation. The Avon district operates Avon High School.

The town has a lending library, the Danville-Center Township Public Library.

== Notable people ==
- Mike Clark, racing driver
- John Cravens, Registrar of Indiana University 1895–1936; raised in Danville
- James M. Ogden, 26th Indiana Attorney General; born in Danville
- Bob Snyder, musician known for playing tenor sax, alto sax, clarinet, and flute; born in Danville
- Travis Steele, head coach of the Miami RedHawks men's basketball team
- Sam Thompson, 19th-century Major League Baseball Hall of Fame player born in Danville

== See also ==
- Holistic Image VIII, public artwork in front of the Town Hall
- Indiana Lyons, 2023 ABA Champions
- Danville Line, former interurban railway
  - Danville station (Indiana), terminal of the Danville Line
