= Washington Township, Hendricks County, Indiana =

Washington Township
- Township
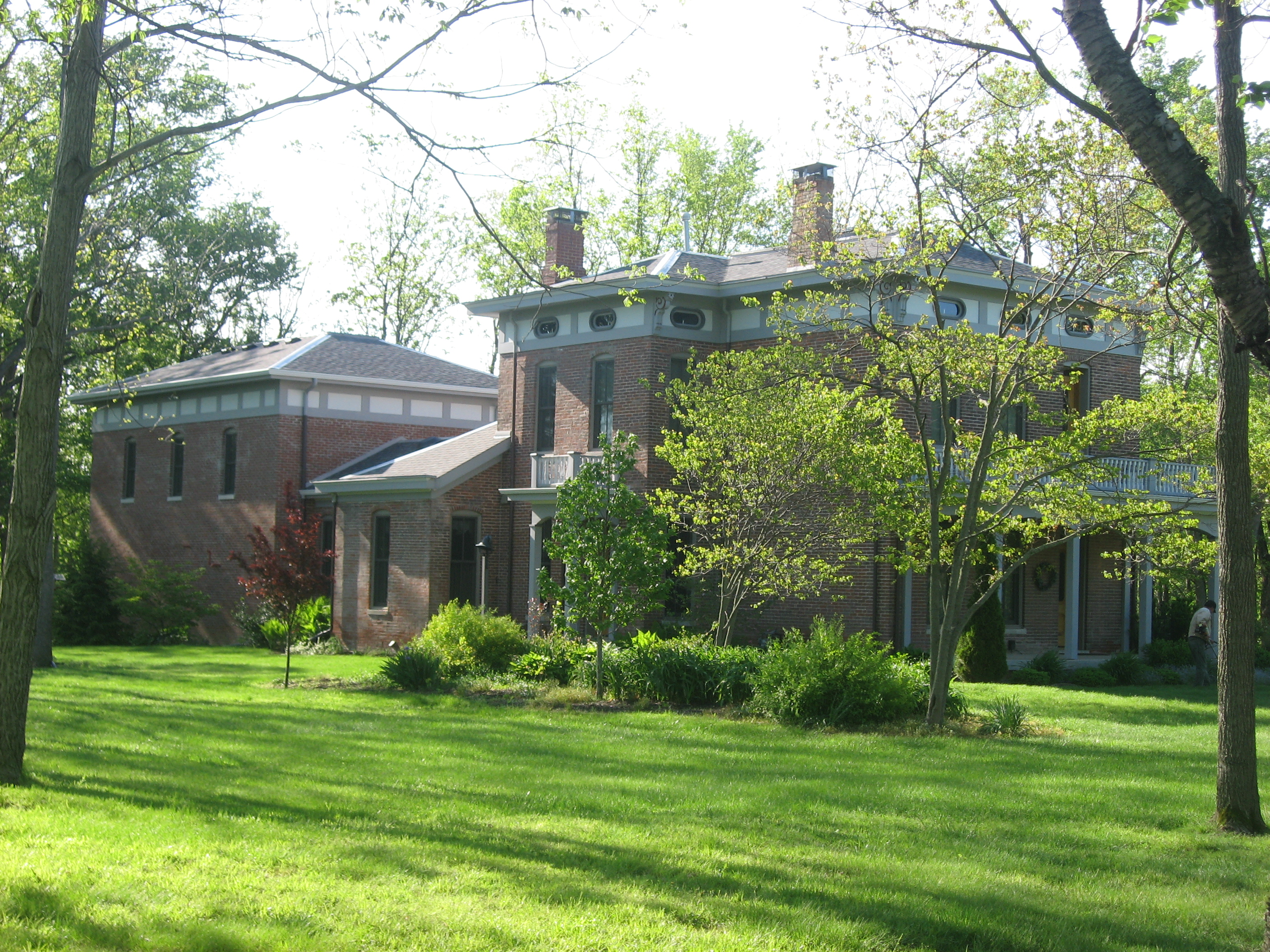
- The John W. McClain House, a historic site in the township

- Seal

- Location in Hendricks County
- Coordinates: 39°45′35″N 86°23′42″W
- Country: United States
- State: Indiana
- County: Hendricks

Government
  - Type: Indiana township

Area
  - Total: 38.68 sq mi (100.18 km^{2})
  - Land: 38.64 sq mi (100.09 km^{2})
  - Water: 0.035 sq mi (0.09 km^{2}) 0.09%
- Elevation: 833 ft (254 m)

Population (2020)
  - Total: 57,176
  - Density: 1,158/sq mi (447.2/km^{2})
- Time zone: UTC-5 (Eastern (EST))
  - Summer (DST): UTC-4 (EDT)
- GNIS feature ID: 454000
- Website: washingtontownshiphendricks.org

Washington Township is one of twelve townships in Hendricks County, Indiana, United States. As of the 2010 census, its population was 44,764.

== History ==
Washington Township was named for George Washington.

The John W. McClain House, A.A. Parsons Farmstead, and Smith Farm are listed on the National Register of Historic Places.

== Geography ==
Washington Township covers an area of 38.68 square miles (100.2 km^{2}); of this, 0.03 square miles (0.078 km^{2}) or 0.09 percent is water. The streams of Abner Creek, Army Branch, Lake Forest Creek and March Creek run through this township.

=== Cities and towns ===
- Avon
- Plainfield (north edge)

=== Unincorporated towns ===
- Arborview Mobile Home Park
- Big Four Yard
- Six Points
- Wynbrooke

(This list is based on USGS data and may include former settlements.)

=== Adjacent townships ===
- Lincoln Township (north)
- Wayne Township, Marion County (east)
- Decatur Township, Marion County (southeast)
- Guilford Township (south)
- Liberty Township (southwest)
- Center Township (west)
- Middle Township (northwest)

=== Cemeteries ===
The township contains twelve cemeteries: Abner Creek, Barlow, Gossett, McClain, Merritt, Merritt Memorial Gardens, North Lawn, Salem Baptist, Shiloh Baptist, Shiloh Methodist, Smith and White Lick Presbyterian.

=== Major highways ===
- U.S. Route 36
- U.S. Route 40
- State Road 267

=== Airports and landing strips ===
- Speedway Airport (Closed)

== Library ==
Washington Township is served by the Avon-Washington Township Public Library in Avon.
