= Joel Jessup Farm =

- U.S. National Register of Historic Places
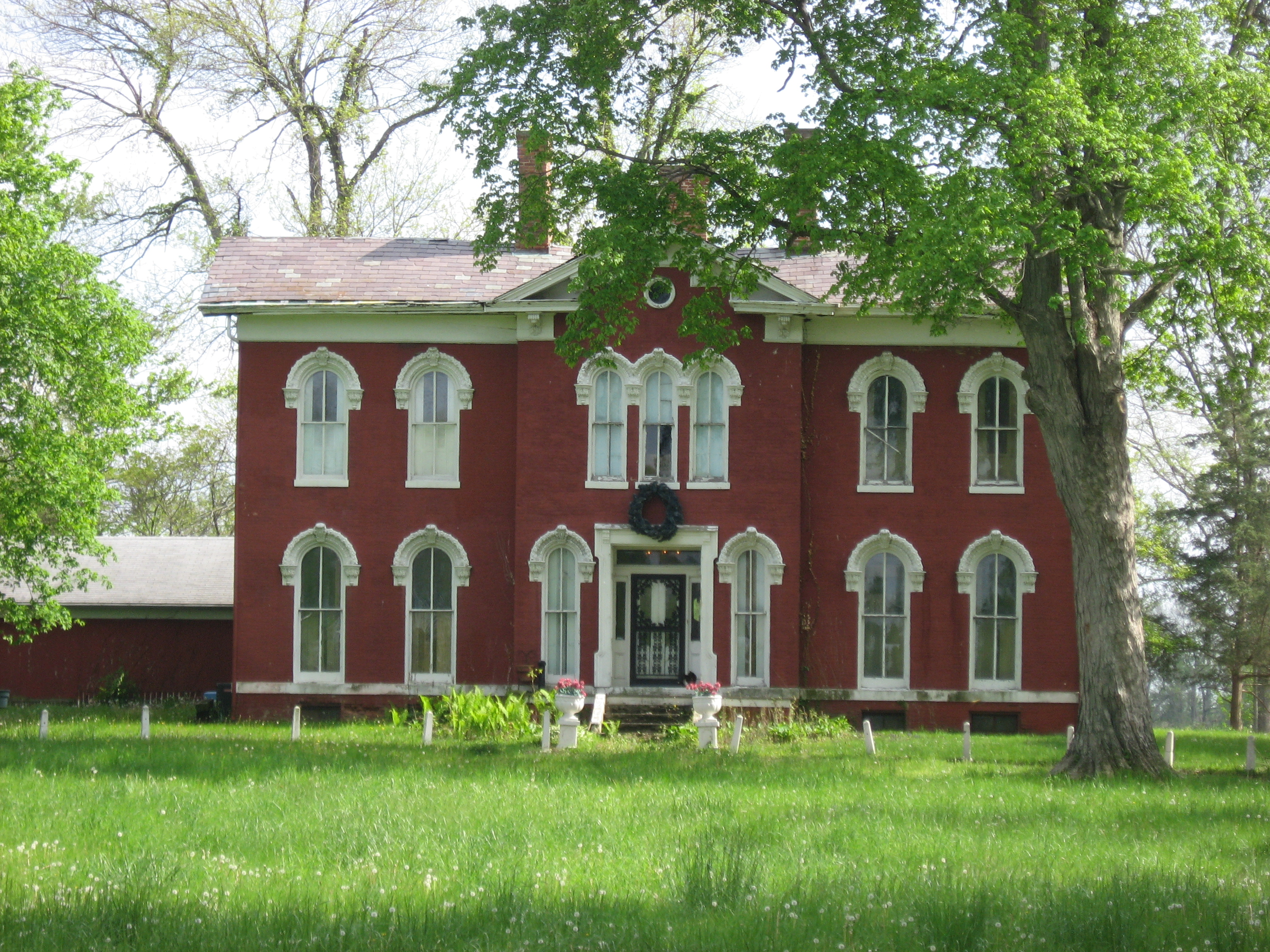
- Joel Jessup Farmhouse, May 2011

- Location within Indiana Location within the United States
- Location: County Road 800S near County Road 1050E, northwest of Friendswood, Guilford Township, Hendricks County, Indiana
- Coordinates: 39°38′44″N 86°20′9″W
- Area: 5.3 acres (2.1 ha)
- Built: 1864
- Built by: Jessup, Joel
- Architectural style: Italianate, I-house
- NRHP reference No.: 98001049
- Added to NRHP: August 14, 1998

Joel Jessup Farm is a historic home and farm located in Guilford Township, Hendricks County, Indiana. The farmhouse was built about 1864, and is a two-story, Italianate style brick I-house with a rear kitchen ell. It has a slate gable roof, round arched windows, and multiple brick chimneys. Also on the property are the contributing traverse frame barn and privy.

It was added to the National Register of Historic Places in 1998.
