= Sugar Grove Meetinghouse and Cemetery =

Historic church in Indiana, United States

- U.S. National Register of Historic Places
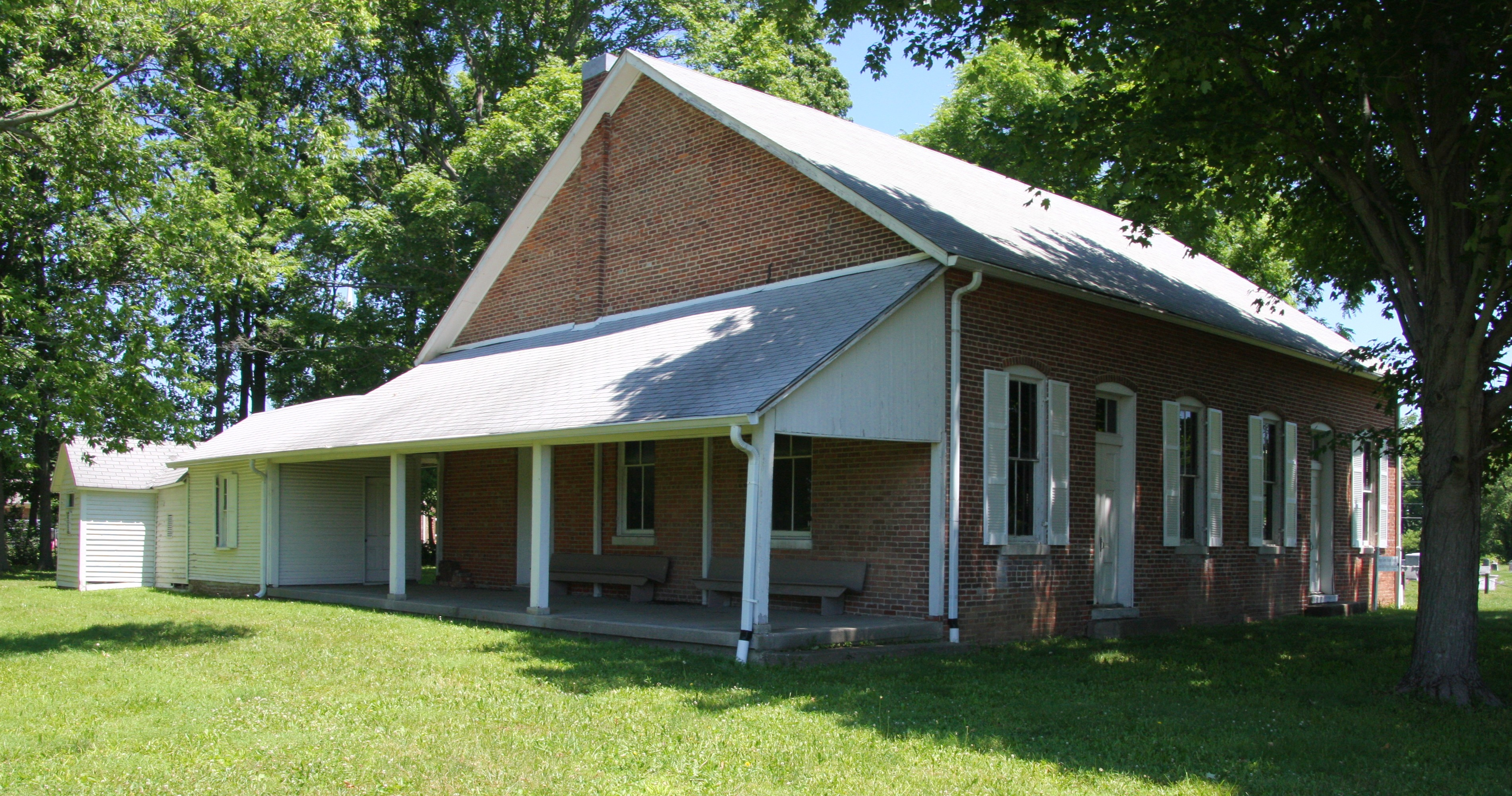
- Sugar Grove Meetinghouse, June 2016

- Location within Indiana Location within the United States
- Location: Junction of County Roads 700E and 600S, Guilford Township, Hendricks County, Indiana
- Coordinates: 39°40′29″N 86°24′1″W
- Area: 4 acres (1.6 ha)
- Built: 1870
- Architectural style: Late Victorian
- NRHP reference No.: 00001137
- Added to NRHP: September 22, 2000

Sugar Grove Meetinghouse and Cemetery is a historic Quaker meeting house and cemetery located in Guilford Township, Hendricks County, Indiana. The meeting house was built in 1870, and enlarged in the late-1870s or early-1880s. It is a one-story, rectangular brick building with a gable roof and connected to other buildings by a covered porch. Also on the property are the contributing school house, privy, and storage shed. The cemetery includes burials dating from the 1840s to 1960s.

The meetinghouse interior is split into two rooms of the same size and layout for male and female congregants. The partition wall between them has wooden panels which can be opened or closed.

It was added to the National Register of Historic Places in 2000. As of 2013, the meetinghouse was used occasionally by a local Quaker group and had been restored without modern plumbing, lights, or air conditioning.
