= Dr. Jeremiah and Ann Jane DePew House =

Historic house in Indiana, United States

- U.S. National Register of Historic Places
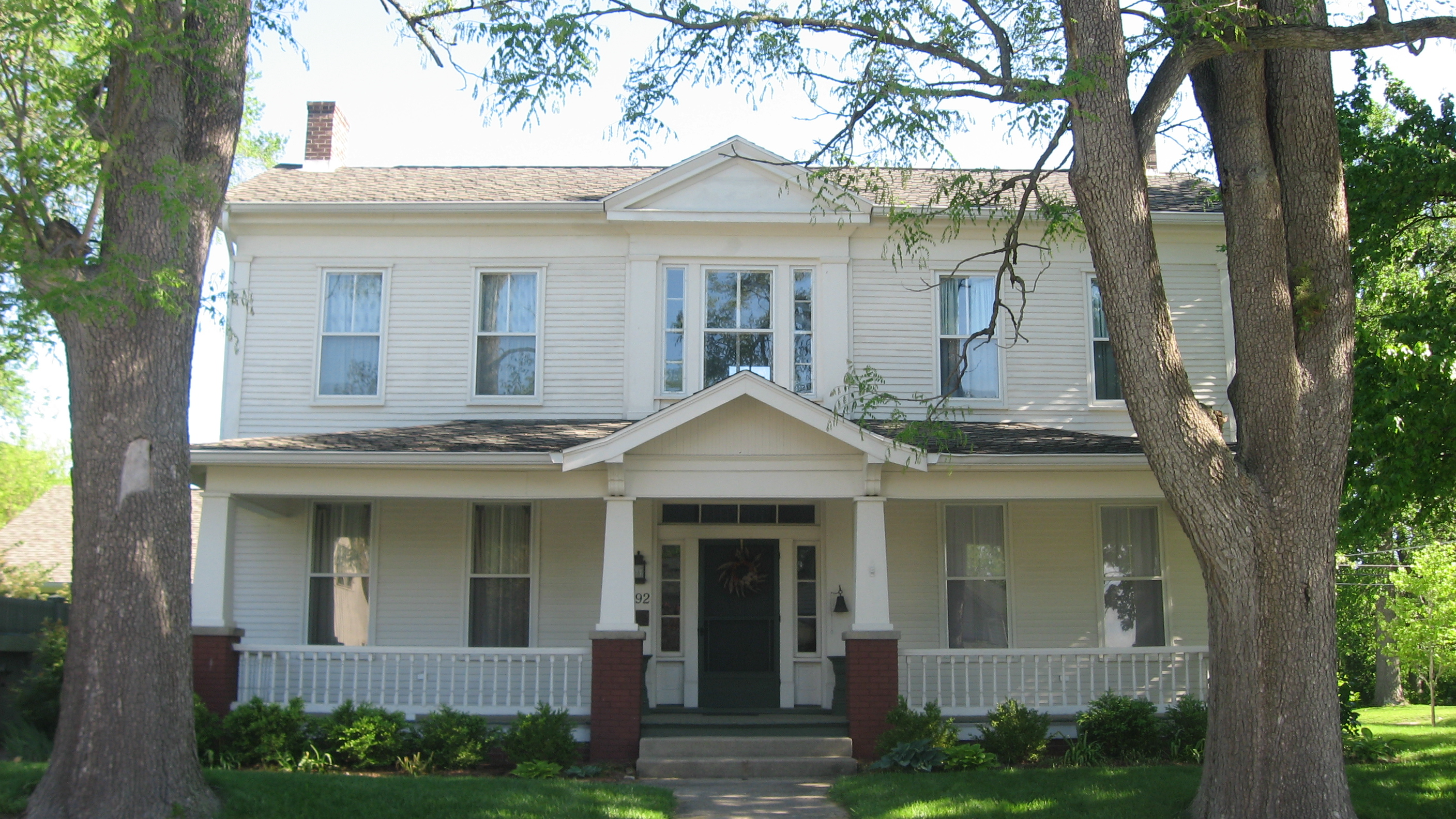
- Dr. Jeremiah and Ann Jane DePew House, May 2011

- Location within Indiana Location within the United States
- Location: 292 East Broadway, Danville, Indiana
- Coordinates: 39°45′33″N 86°31′14″W
- Area: less than one acre
- Built: 1858
- Architectural style: Greek Revival
- NRHP reference No.: 06000850
- Added to NRHP: September 20, 2006

Dr. Jeremiah and Ann Jane DePew House is a historic home located at Danville, Indiana. It was built in 1858, and is a two-story, five-bay, I-house with a one-story rear ell and Greek Revival style design elements. A full width American Craftsman style front porch was added after 1936.

It was added to the National Register of Historic Places in 2006.
