= A.A. Parsons Farmstead =

- U.S. National Register of Historic Places
- U.S. Historic district
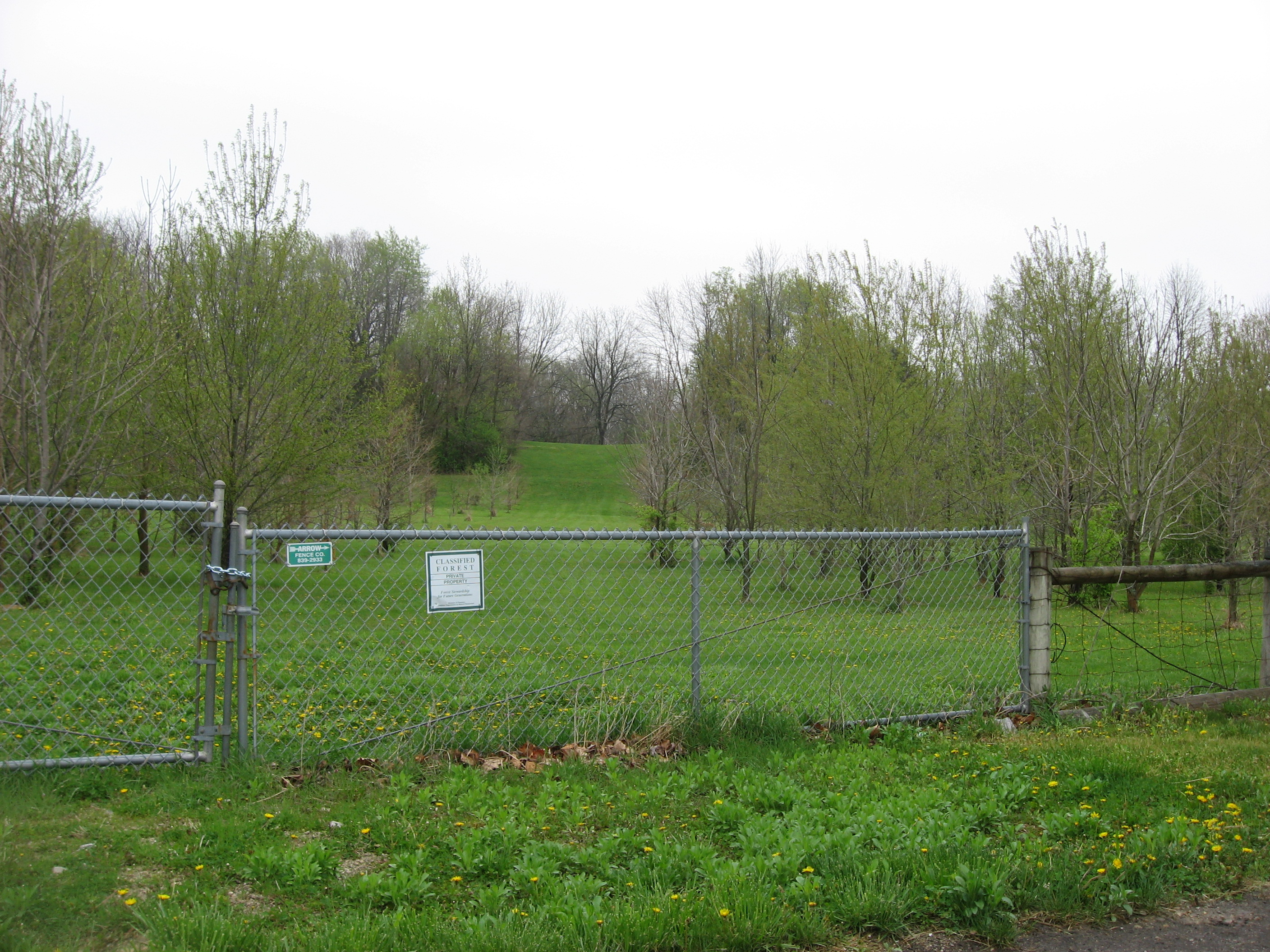
- A.A. Parsons Farmstead fields, April 2014

- Location within Indiana Location within the United States
- Location: 1739 S625E, Washington Township, Hendricks County, Indiana
- Coordinates: 39°44′14″N 86°25′10″W
- Area: 45 acres (18 ha)
- NRHP reference No.: 14000803
- Added to NRHP: September 30, 2014

A.A. Parsons Farmstead, also known as the Parsons / Vapor Farmstead, is a historic farm and national historic district located at Washington Township, Hendricks County, Indiana. The district encompasses eight contributing buildings, four contributing structures, and seven contributing objects on a farmstead developed between about 1880 and 1920. The farm includes a one-of-a-kind combination building with a hog barn, chicken house, and corn cribs. The farmhouse was built about 1875 and is a 1 1/2-story, L-shaped frame dwelling.

It was added to the National Register of Historic Places in 2014.
