= Kellum–Jessup–Chandler Farm =

- Formerly listed on the U.S. National Register of Historic Places
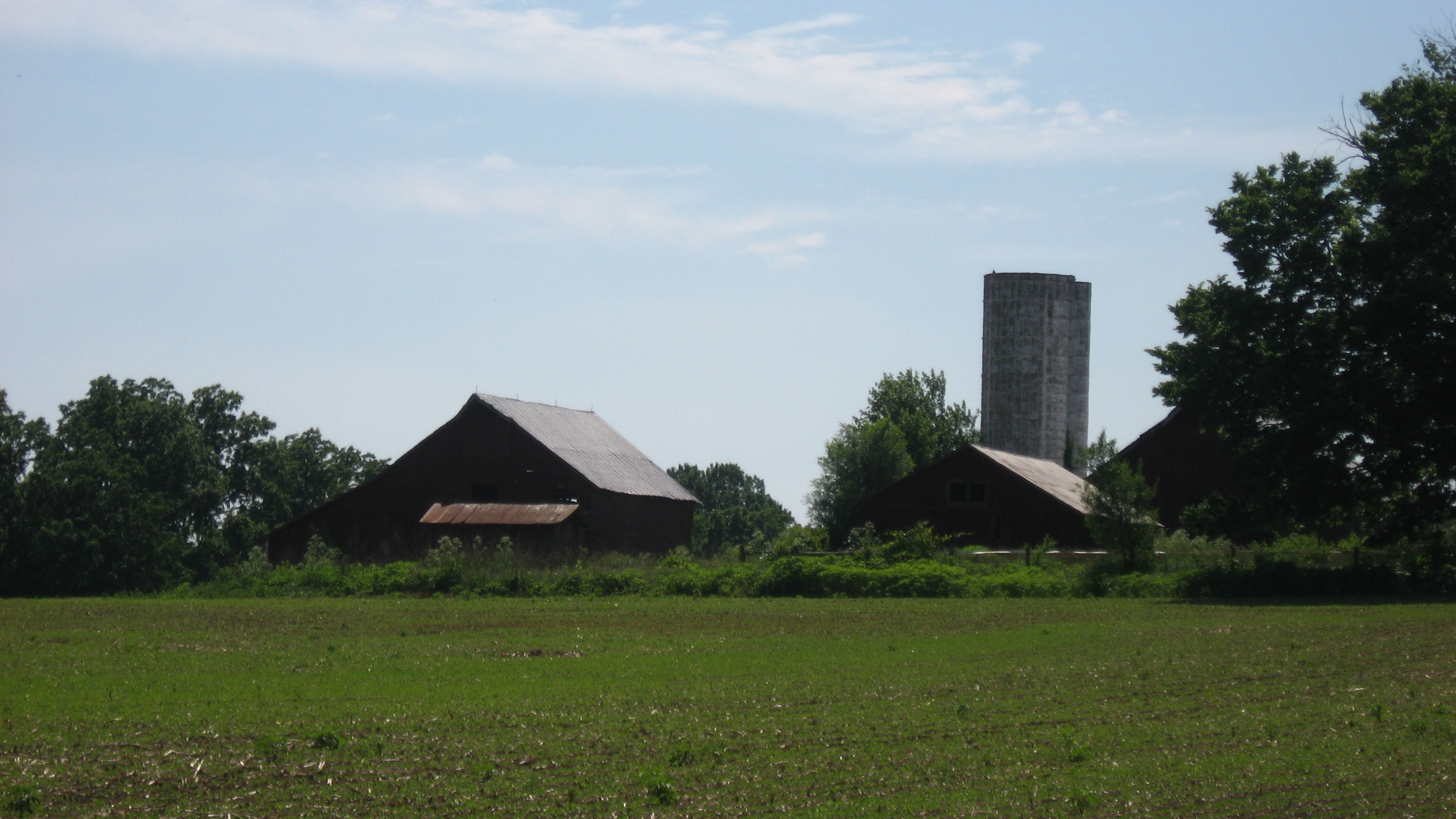
- Kellum–Jessup–Chandler Farm, June 2011

- Location within Indiana Location within the United States
- Location: 6726 S. White Lick Creek Rd., southeast of Plainfield in Guilford Township, Hendricks County, Indiana
- Coordinates: 39°39′55″N 86°20′36″W
- Area: 23 acres (9.3 ha)
- Built: 1862
- Architectural style: Greek Revival, I-House
- NRHP reference No.: 94001111

Significant dates
- Added to NRHP: September 8, 1994
- Removed from NRHP: November 15, 2021

Kellum–Jessup–Chandler Farm is a historic home and farm located in Guilford Township, Hendricks County, Indiana. The farmhouse was built about 1862, and is a two-story, central passage plan, brick I-house with Greek Revival style design elements. It has a gable roof, two-story rear ell, and sits on a brick foundation. Also on the property are the contributing three traverse frame barns, brick smokehouse, privy, chicken house, dairy barn, milk house, corn crib, and tractor shed.

It was added to the National Register of Historic Places in 1994.
