= Wilson-Courtney House =

Historic house in Indiana, United States

- U.S. National Register of Historic Places
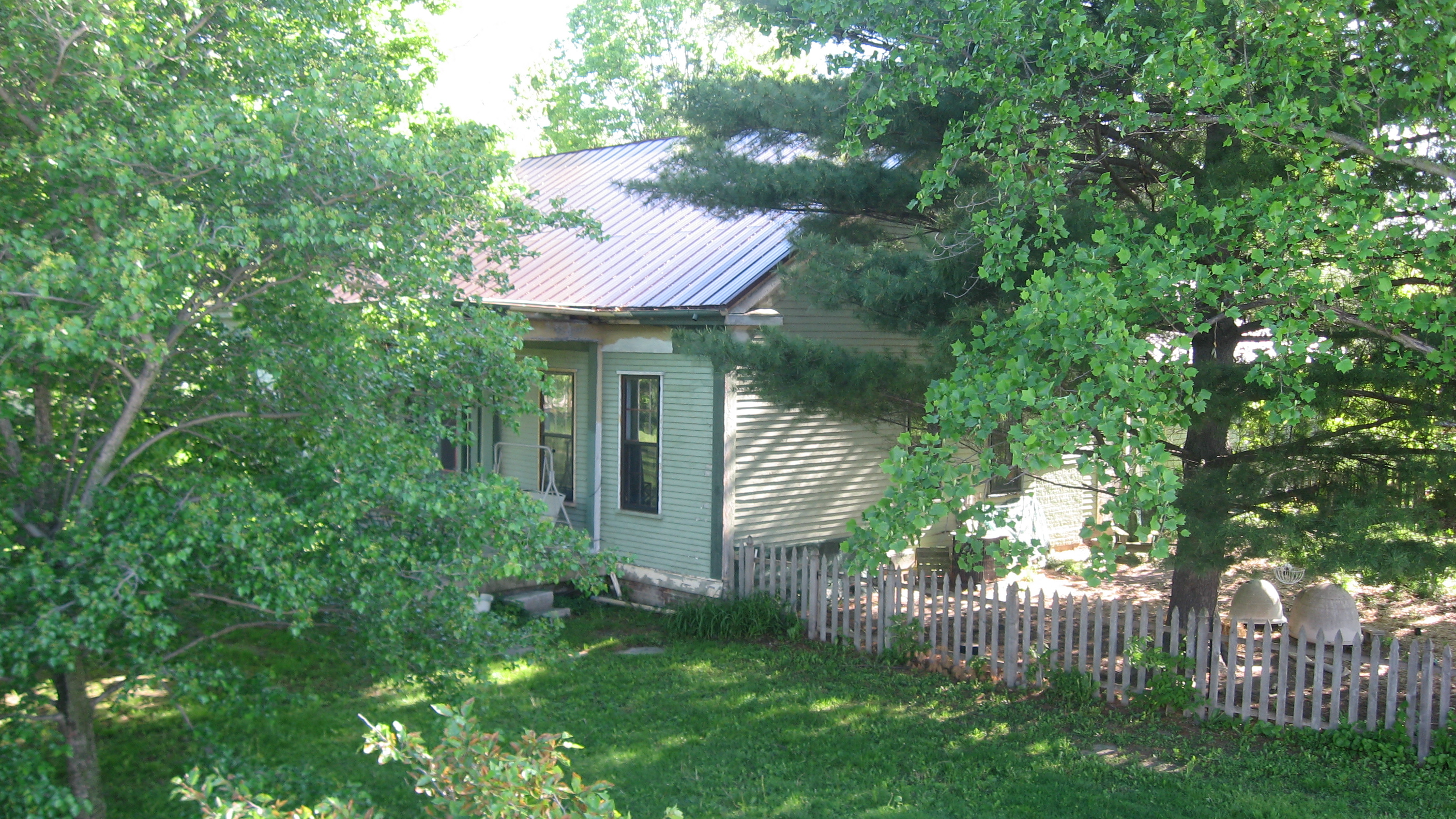
- Wilson-Courtney House, May 2011

- Location within Indiana Location within the United States
- Location: 10 Cartersburg Rd., Danville, Indiana
- Coordinates: 39°45′10″N 86°31′14″W
- Area: 4 acres (1.6 ha)
- Built: 1848-1850
- Built by: Matlock, David
- Architectural style: Greek Revival
- NRHP reference No.: 84001044
- Added to NRHP: February 9, 1984

Wilson-Courtney House, also known as the Courtney House, is a historic home located at Danville, Indiana. It was built between 1848 and 1850, and is a 1 1/2-story frame dwelling with a one-story rear ell and Greek Revival style design elements. Also on the property is a contributing smokehouse.

It was added to the National Register of Historic Places in 1984.
