= Twin Bridges (Danville, Indiana) =

- U.S. National Register of Historic Places
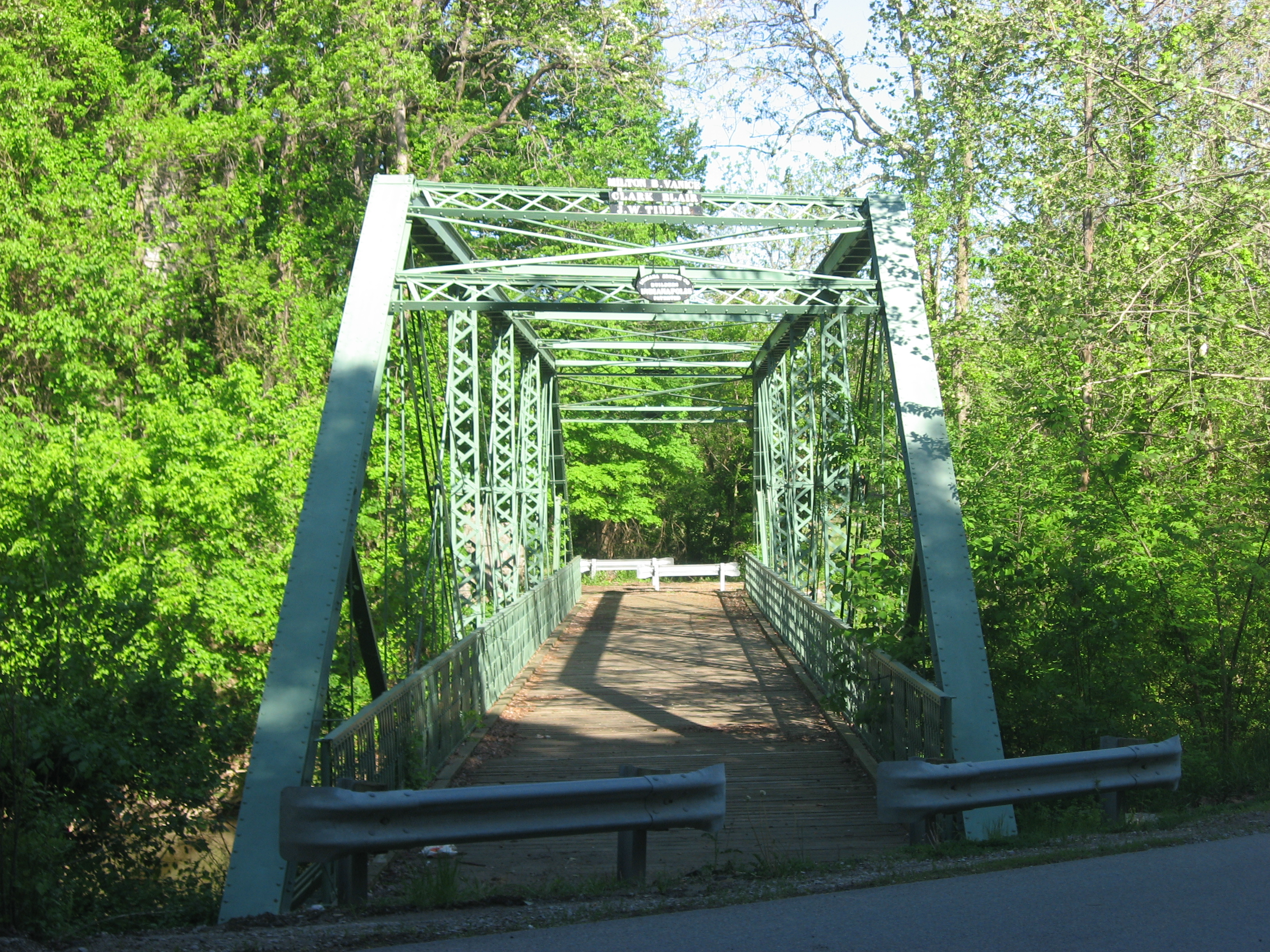
- County Bridge 178, May 2011

- Location within Indiana Location within the United States
- Location: County Road 150E over White Lick Creek, Danville, Indiana
- Coordinates: 39°45′15″N 86°30′15″W
- Area: 3.6 acres (1.5 ha)
- Built: c. 1870, 1887, 1906
- Architectural style: Wrought-Iron Baltimore through Truss
- NRHP reference No.: 00000200
- Added to NRHP: March 15, 2000

Twin Bridges are two historic bridges located at Danville, Indiana. The Hendricks County Bridge #178 is a Baltimore through Truss bridge built in 1887. The wrought iron bridge measures 149 feet, 6 inches, long and spans White Lick Creek. The Big Four Railroad Bridge was built by the Big Four Railroad and built in 1906. It is a three-span concrete structure and spans White Lick Creek and County Road 150 East. Associated with the bridges is a cut stone railroad abutment built about 1870.

It was added to the National Register of Historic Places in 2000.
