= Ora Adams House =

Historic house in Indiana, United States

- U.S. National Register of Historic Places
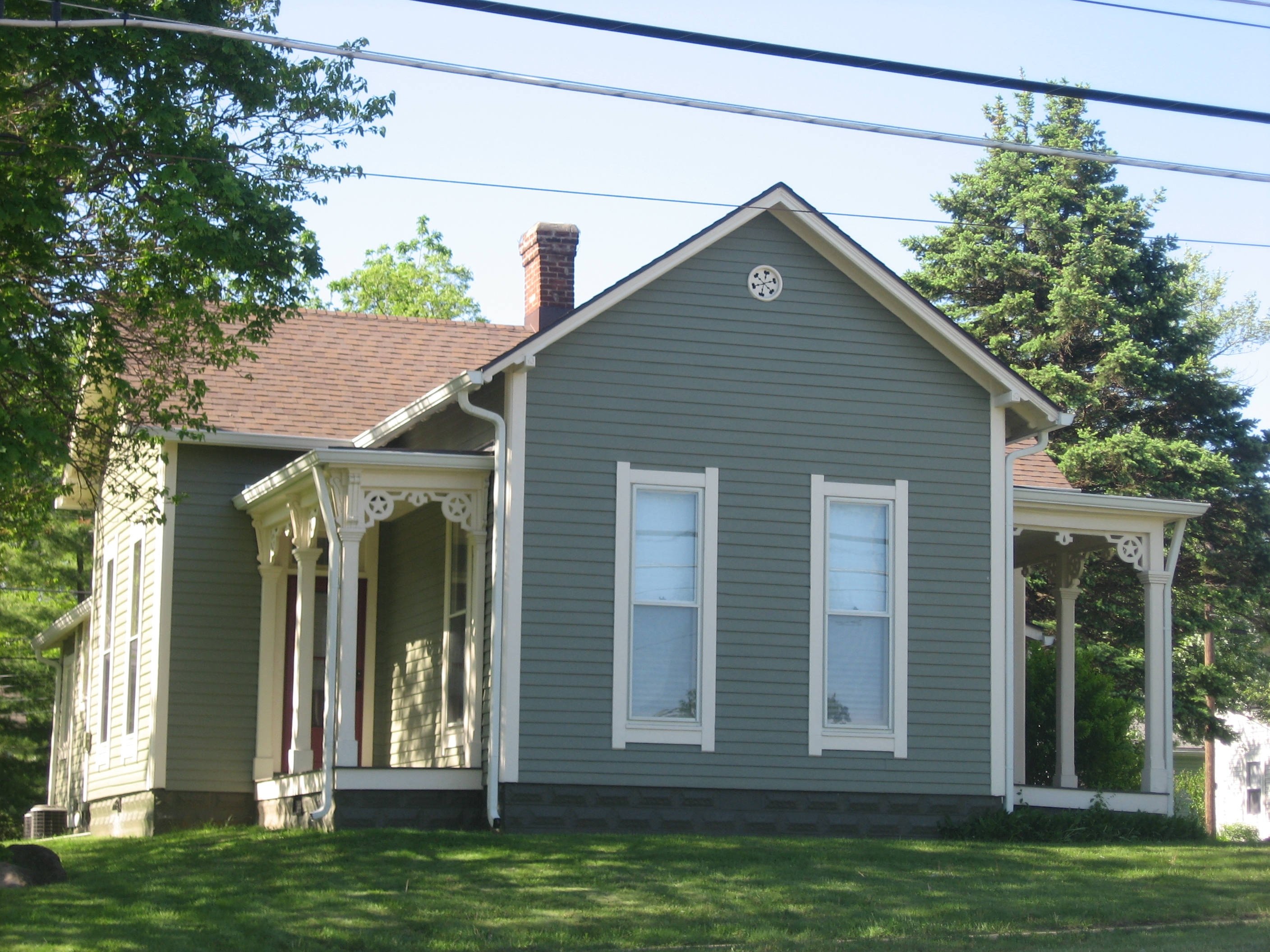
- Ora Adams House, May 2011

- Location within Indiana Location within the United States
- Location: 301-303 E. Main St., Danville, Indiana
- Coordinates: 39°45′36″N 86°31′15″W
- Area: less than one acre
- Built: 1883
- Architectural style: Queen Anne
- NRHP reference No.: 09000425
- Added to NRHP: June 17, 2009

Ora Adams House is a historic home located at Danville, Indiana. It was built in 1883, and is a one-story, Queen Anne style frame cottage. It has a cross-gable roof and sits on a brick foundation. It is the only extant building associated with first campus buildings of the Central Normal School.

It was added to the National Register of Historic Places in 2009.
