= Danville Courthouse Square Historic District =

Historic district in Indiana, United States

- U.S. National Register of Historic Places
- U.S. Historic district
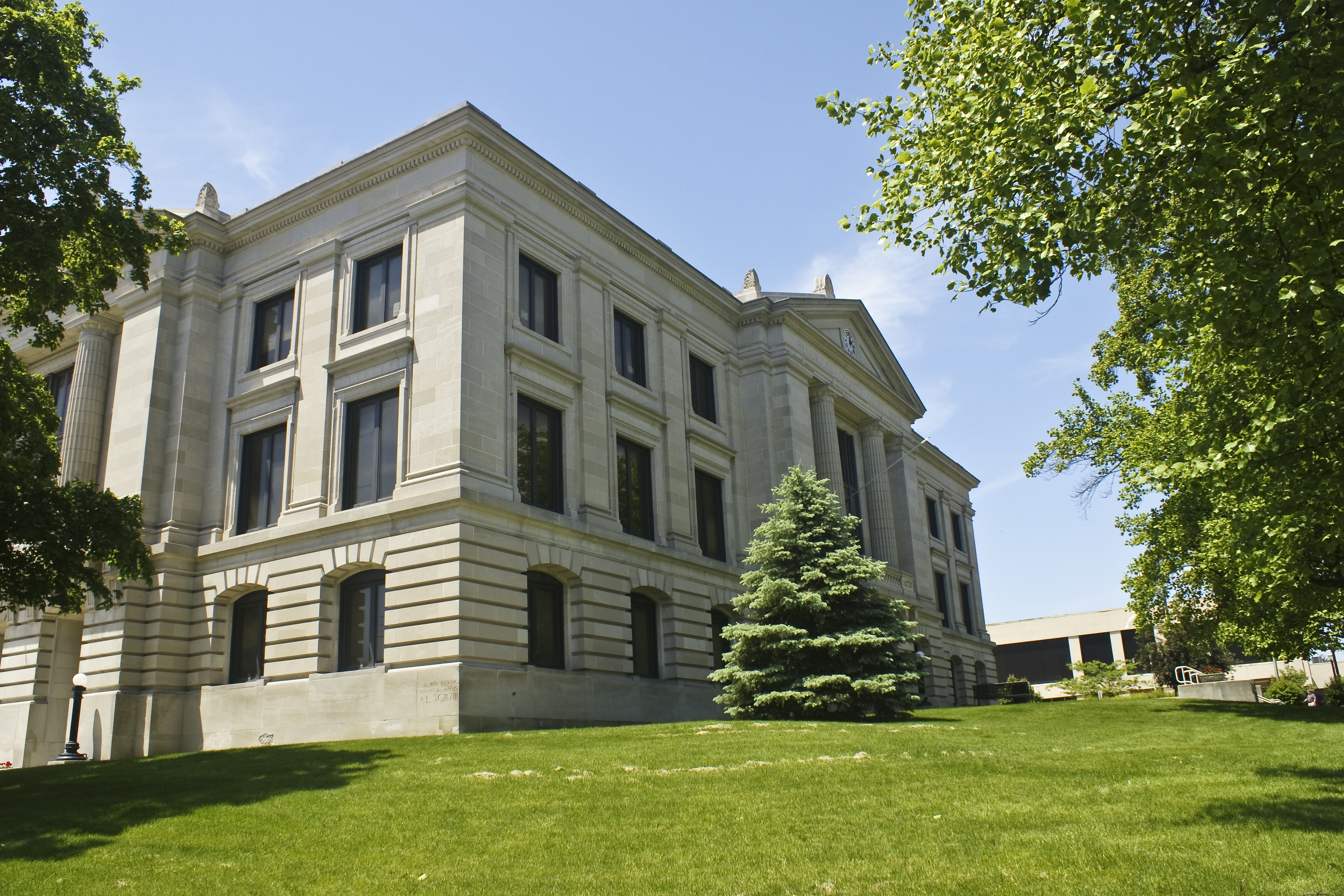
- Hendricks County Indiana Courthouse, June 2008

- Location within Indiana Location within the United States
- Location: Roughly bounded by Clinton, Tennessee, Broadway, and Cross Sts., Danville, Indiana
- Coordinates: 39°45′37″N 86°31′26″W
- Area: 70 acres (28 ha)
- Architect: Martindale, Clarence
- Architectural style: Italianate, Classical Revival, Beaux-Arts, Tudor Revival
- NRHP reference No.: 02001559
- Added to NRHP: December 27, 2010

Danville Courthouse Square Historic District is a national historic district located at Danville, Indiana. The district encompasses 42 contributing buildings and two contributing structures in the central business district of Danville. The district developed between about 1865 and 1960 and includes notable examples of Italianate, Classical Revival, Beaux-Arts, and Tudor Revival style architecture. Located in the district is the separately listed Hendricks County Jail and Sheriff's Residence. Other notable buildings include the Hall Block (c. 1900), Danville Public Library (1902–1903), Hendricks County Courthouse (1915), and Danville Post Office (1936).

It was added to the National Register of Historic Places in 2010.
