= Leander Campbell House =

Historic house in Indiana, United States

- U.S. National Register of Historic Places
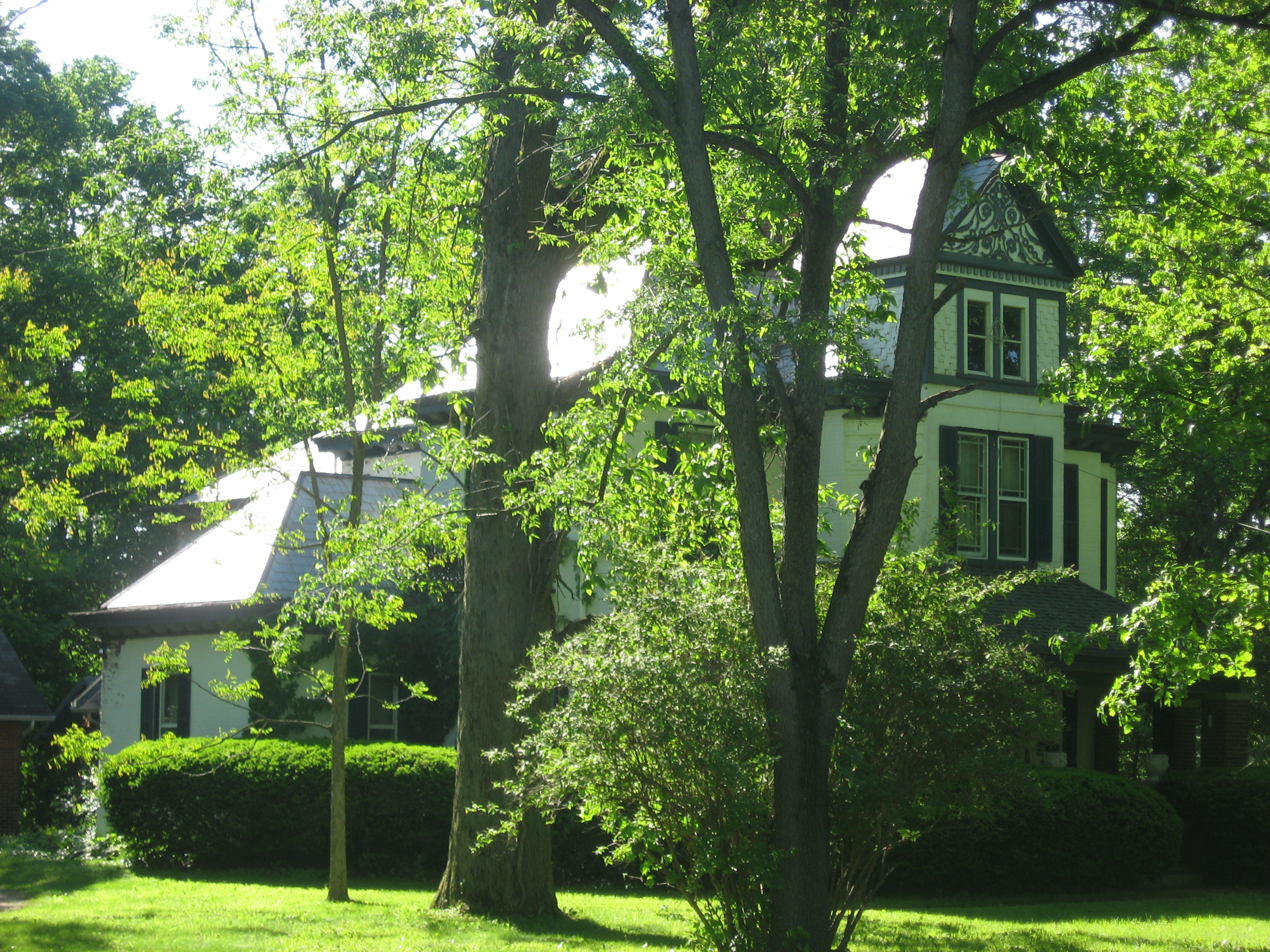
- Leander Campbell House, May 2011

- Location within Indiana Location within the United States
- Location: 498 E. Broadway St., Danville, Indiana
- Coordinates: 39°45′29″N 86°30′58″W
- Area: 4.5 acres (1.8 ha)
- Built: 1858, c. 1885
- Built by: Miller, William; Curry, Robert
- Architectural style: Queen Anne
- NRHP reference No.: 03000981
- Added to NRHP: September 28, 2003

Leander Campbell House, also known as the Judge Brill House, is a historic home located at Danville, Indiana. It was built in 1858 as a simple 1 1/2-story brick I-house. It was extensively remodeled and updated in the Queen Anne style about 1885. It has a slate hipped roof and features a centrally placed three-story tower on the front facade. Also on the property are the contributing summer kitchen and brick garage.

It was added to the National Register of Historic Places in 2003.
