= Hendricks County Jail and Sheriff's Residence =

Historic government buildings in Indiana, United States

- U.S. National Register of Historic Places
- U.S. Historic district – Contributing property
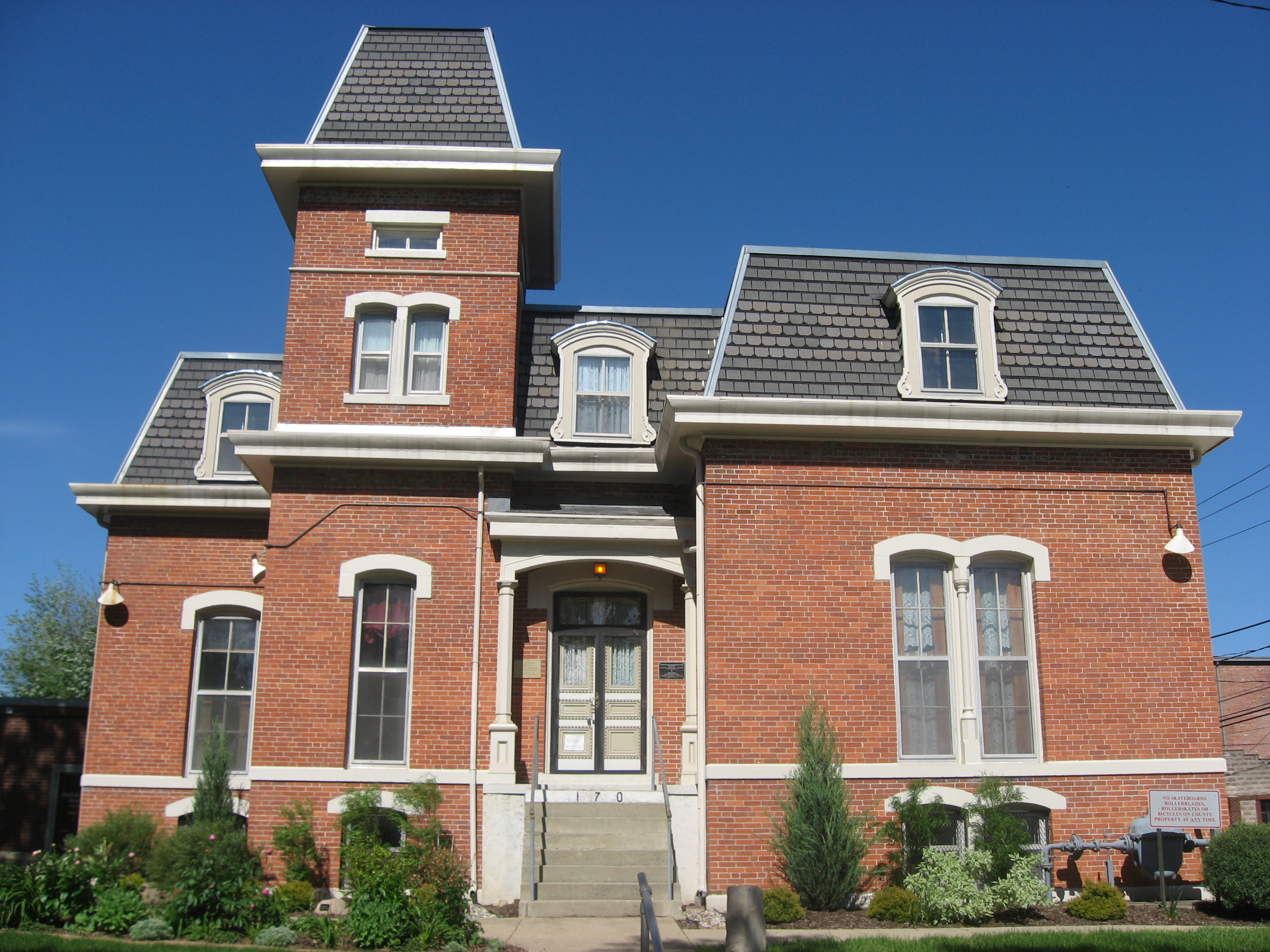
- Hendricks County Jail and Sheriff's Residence, May 2011

- Location within Indiana Location within the United States
- Location: 170 S. Washington St., Danville, Indiana
- Coordinates: 39°45′32″N 86°31′27″W
- Area: less than one acre
- Built: 1866-1867
- Architect: Gregg, Martin
- Architectural style: Second Empire
- NRHP reference No.: 83000125
- Added to NRHP: June 30, 1983

Hendricks County Jail and Sheriff's Residence, also known as Hendricks County Museum, is a historic home and jail located at Danville, Indiana. It was built in 1866–1867, and is a two-story, Second Empire style brick building with a three-story square tower. It has a slate mansard roof and segmental arched openings. It consists of the former Sheriff's residence in front and a one-story rear wing with later additions containing the jail. The building has housed the Hendricks County Museum since 1974.

It was added to the National Register of Historic Places in 1983. It is located in the Danville Courthouse Square Historic District.

List of Sheriffs

Thomas Matlock (1824–1862)

John Dunn (1826–1827)

Samuel Jessup (1827–1828)

Thomas Nichols (1828–1833)

James Siggerson (1833–1837)

Edmunds Clark (1837–1843)

J.D. Parker (1843–1844)

James Stutsman (1848–1850)

Samuel Meloque (1850–1854)

Cornelius O’Haver (1854–1858)

Reuben S. Ward (1858–1860)

Thomas Nichols (1860–1864)

Edmund H. Straughan (1864–1868)

William H. Calvert (1868–1872)

Samuel L. Hawkins (1872–1876)

Asbury Bryant (1876–1878)

James H. Emmons (1878–1882)

Abraham Douglas (1882–1884)

William P. Ayers (1884–1886)

Woodson Bryant (1886–1888)

Jonathan S. Marshal (1888–1890)

William C. Clements (1890–1892)

John T. Taylor (1892–1894)

John T. Bell (1894–1896)

William B. Bryant (1896–1898)

Henry I. Eaton (1898–1900)

A. A. Fligg (1900–1904)

Isaac J. Mendenhall (1904–1908)

John C. Robbins (1908–1910)

John W. Ader (1910–1912)

James N. Gentry (1912–1916)

Robert Hufford (1916–1920)

Charles T. Clark (1920–1924)

S. V. Hollingsworth (1924–1925)

Henry C. Rodney (1925–1928)

Albert H. Shane (1928–1930)

Lewis L. Pounds (1930–1934)

Wiltsie Stuart (1935–1938)

Oscar Bradford (1938–1943)

Leon Bayliss (1943–1947)

Porter Money (1947–1956)

Leon Bayliss (1956–1962)

Merle Funk (1962–1970)

Russell Carmichael (1971–1979)
