= Smith Farm (Plainfield, Indiana) =

- Formerly listed on the U.S. National Register of Historic Places
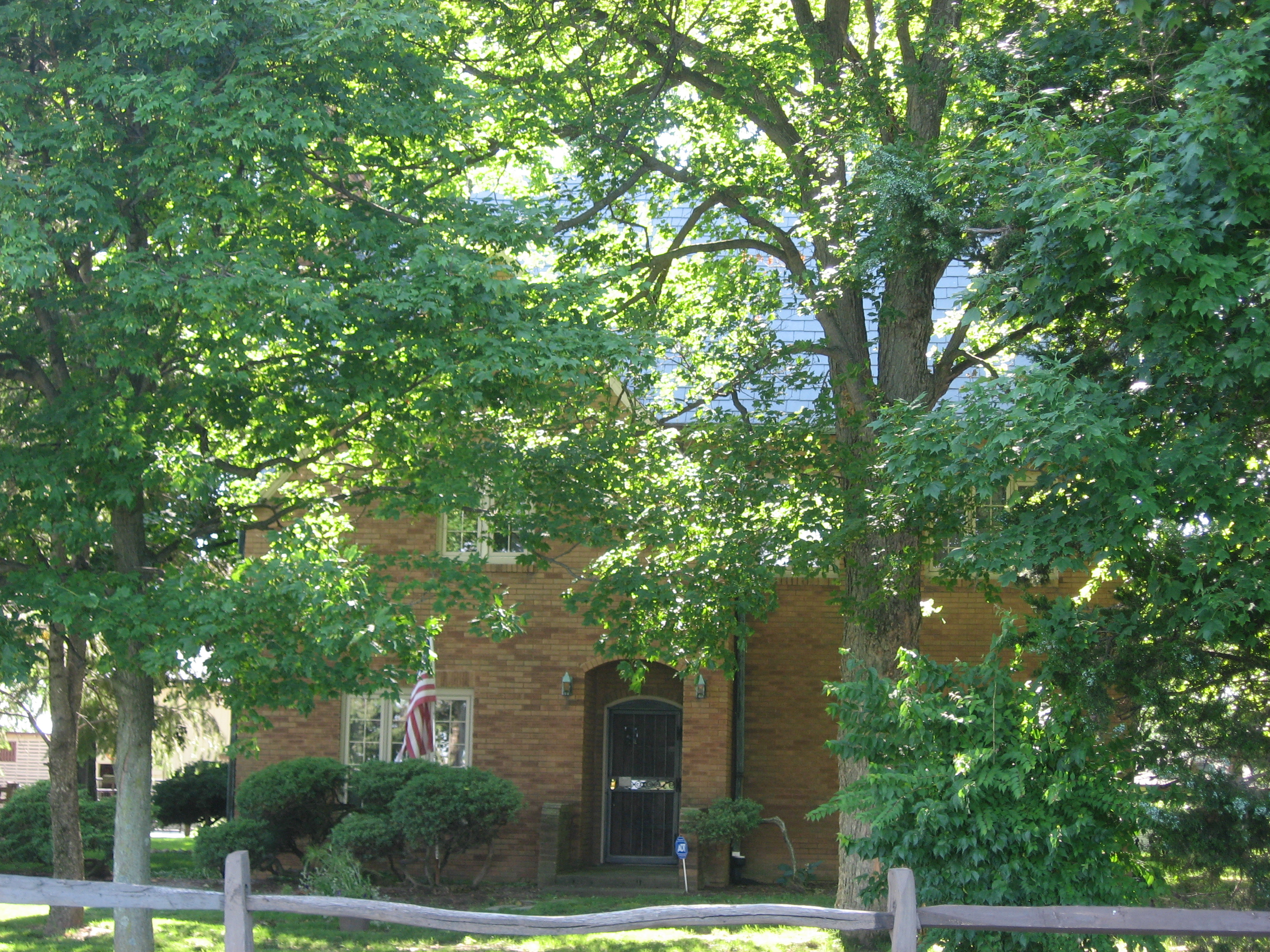
- Smith Farmhouse, June 2011

- Location within Indiana Location within the United States
- Location: 2698 S. County Road 900E, northeast of Plainfield in Washington Township, Hendricks County, Indiana
- Coordinates: 39°43′34″N 86°21′42″W
- Area: 3.2 acres (1.3 ha)
- Built: 1928
- Architectural style: Tudor Revival
- NRHP reference No.: 07001279

Significant dates
- Added to NRHP: December 19, 2007
- Removed from NRHP: December 7, 2023

Smith Farm, also known as the Smith-Grundy Farm, is a historic home and farm located in Washington Township, Hendricks County, Indiana. The farmhouse was built in 1928, and is a two-story, Tudor Revival style frame dwelling with a brick veneer. It has a steeply pitched side gable roof and projecting front gabled pavilion. Also on the property are the contributing English barn, butcher shop, corn crib, and cattle barn, all dated to the mid-1920s.

It was added to the National Register of Historic Places in 2007, and was delisted in 2023.
