= Danville Community School Corporation =

School in Indiana, United States

Location
- Danville, Hendricks County, Indiana, US

District information
- Grades: Pre-K to 12th
- Schools: North Elementary; South Elementary; Danville Community Middle School; Danville Community High School

Other information
- Website: www.danville.k12.in.us

The Danville Community School Corporation is a school district located in Danville, Hendricks County, Indiana. It consists of North Elementary (Pre-K to 2nd grade), South Elementary (3rd grade to 4th grade), Danville Community Middle School (5th grade to 8th grade), and Danville Community High School (9th grade to 12th grade).

The high school's mascot is the Warrior.

The school district is coextensive with Center Township, and includes the vast majority of Danville.
