= Hendricks County Bridge Number 316 =

- U.S. National Register of Historic Places
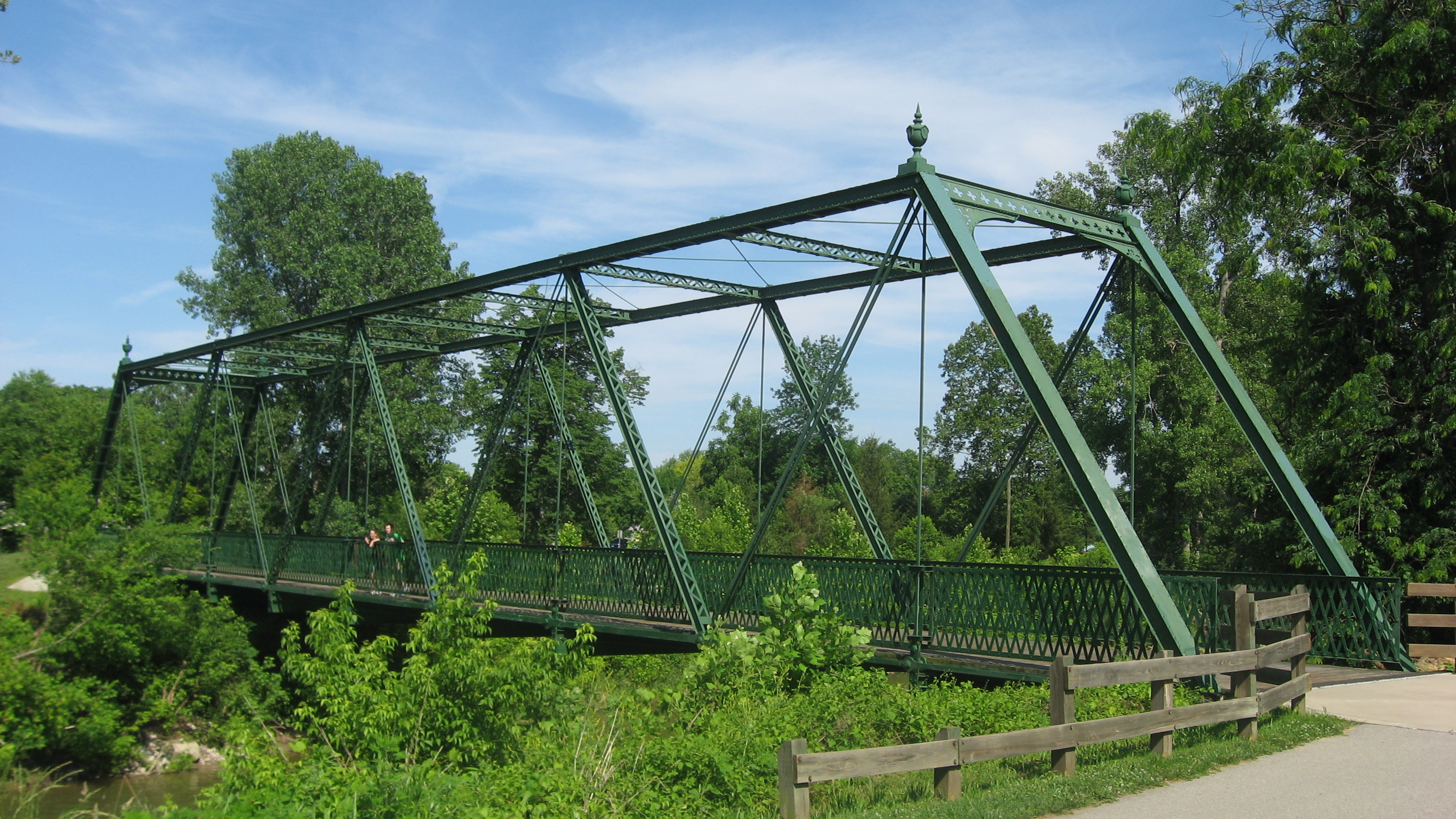
- Hendricks County Bridge 316, June 2011

- Location within Indiana Location within the United States
- Location: Center Rd., Friendship Gardens over White Lick Creek, Plainfield, Indiana
- Coordinates: 39°41′47″N 86°24′7″W
- Area: less than one acre
- Built: 1886
- Built by: Morse Bridge Co.
- Architectural style: Pinned Warren
- NRHP reference No.: 03000140
- Added to NRHP: March 26, 2003

Hendricks County Bridge Number 316, also known as Friendship Gardens Bridge, is a historic Pinned Warren Truss bridge located at Plainfield, Indiana. It was built in 1886, by the Morse Bridge Company of Youngstown, Ohio. The single span bridge measures 170 feet long and spans White Lick Creek.

It was added to the National Register of Historic Places in 2003.
