= John W. McClain House =

Historic house in Indiana, United States

- U.S. National Register of Historic Places
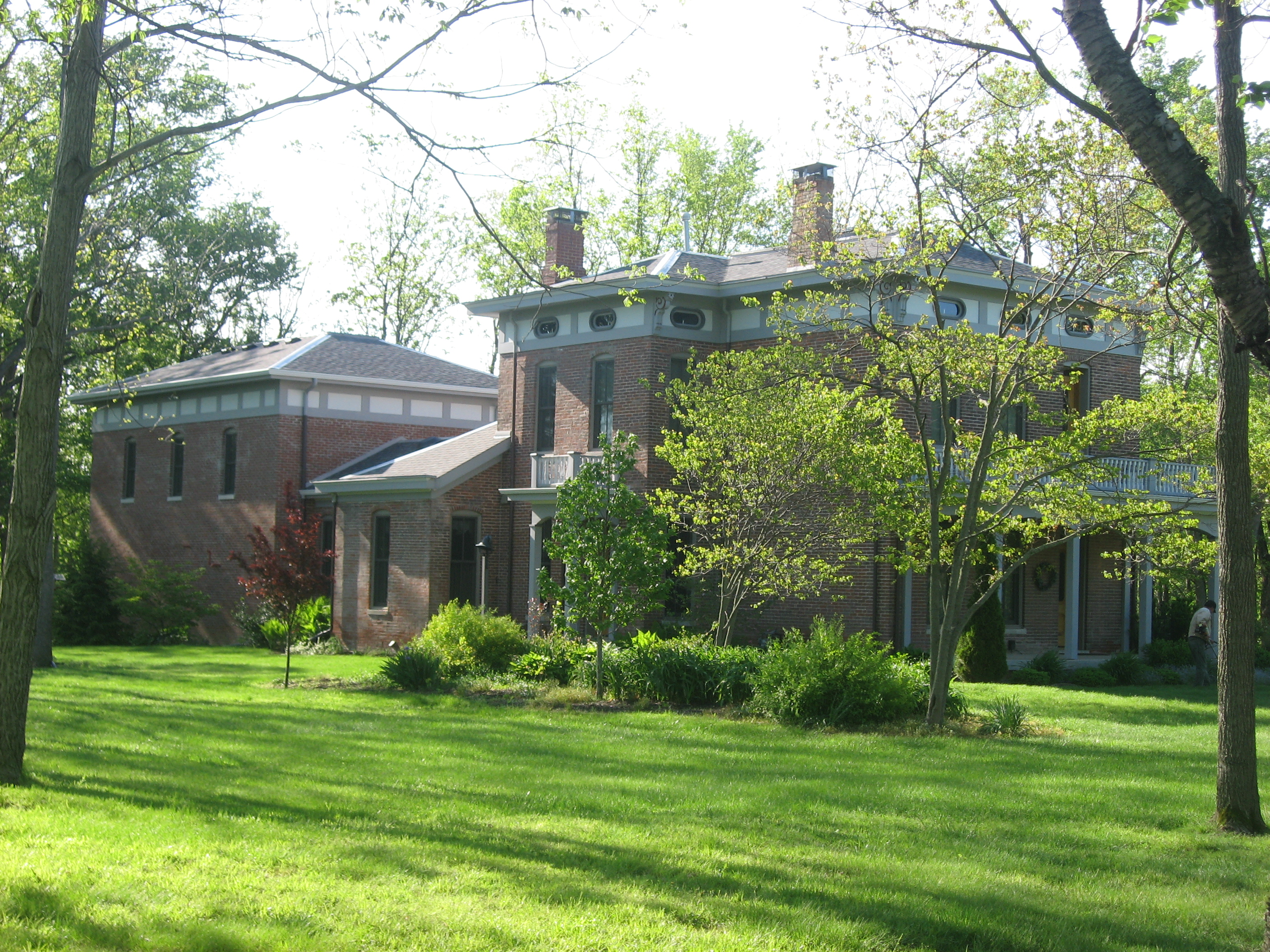
- John W. McClain House, May 2011

- Location within Indiana Location within the United States
- Location: 1445 S. County Road 525E, southwest of Avon in Washington Township, Hendricks County, Indiana
- Coordinates: 39°44′59″N 86°25′44″W
- Area: 5 acres (2.0 ha)
- Built: c. 1876, c. 1880
- Architectural style: Italianate
- NRHP reference No.: 04000633
- Added to NRHP: June 22, 2004

John W. McClain House is a historic home located in Washington Township, Hendricks County, Indiana. It was built about 1876, and is a 2 1/2-story, Italianate style brick dwelling. It has a hipped roof that was formerly topped by a widow's walk. A one-story addition was built about 1880, and a one-story wraparound porch was added in the early-20th century.

It was added to the National Register of Historic Places in 2004.
