= Noah and Hannah Hadley Kellum House =

Historic house in Indiana, United States

- U.S. National Register of Historic Places
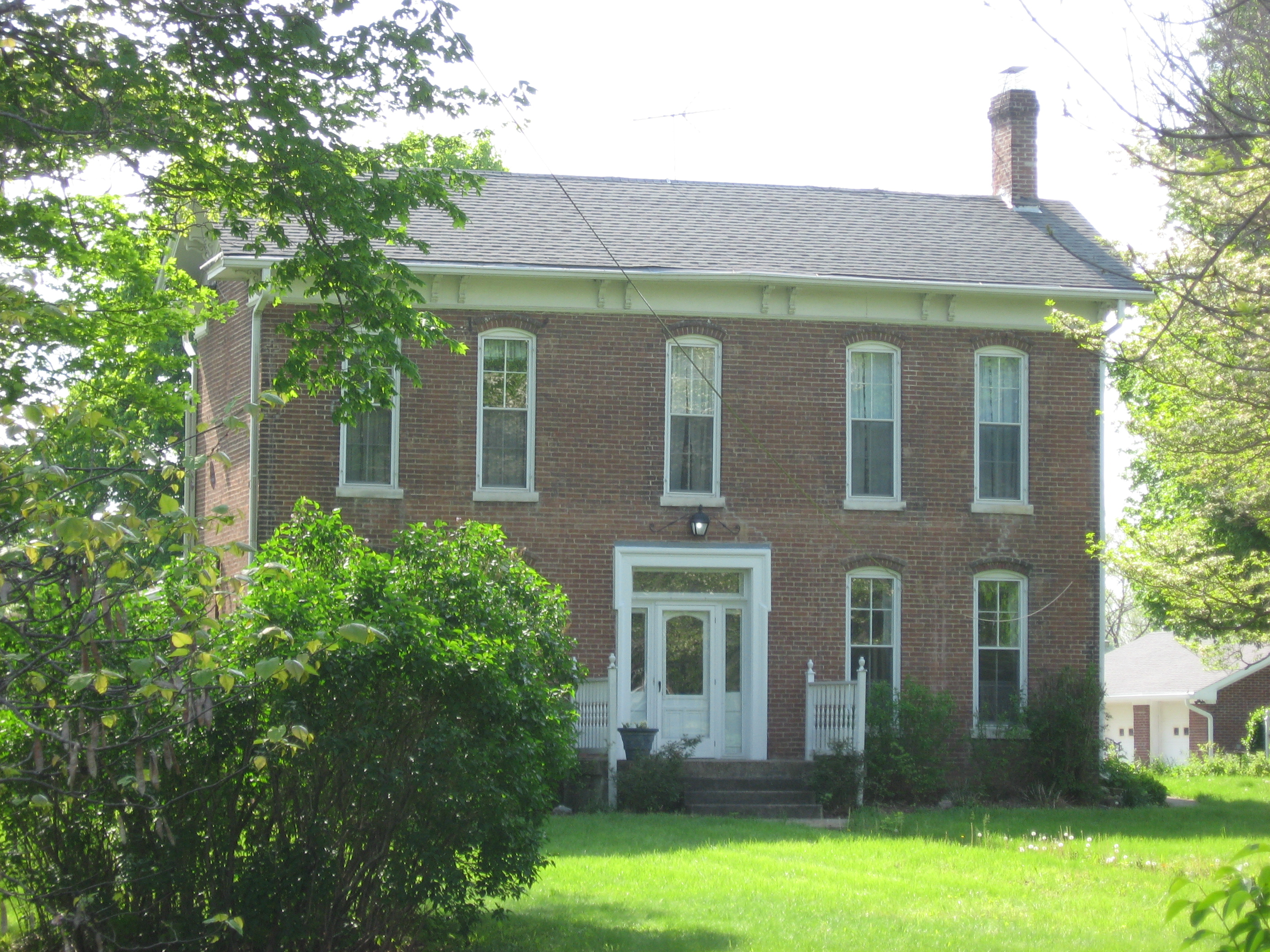
- Noah and Hannah Hadley Kellum House, May 2011

- Location within Indiana Location within the United States
- Location: 7290 S. County Road 1050E, northwest of Friendswood, Guilford Township, Hendricks County, Indiana
- Coordinates: 39°39′25″N 86°20′11″W
- Area: 2 acres (0.81 ha)
- Built: 1872
- Architectural style: Greek Revival, Italianate, I-House
- NRHP reference No.: 95000204
- Added to NRHP: March 3, 1995

Noah and Hannah Hadley Kellum House is a historic home located in Guilford Township, Hendricks County, Indiana. It was built in 1872, and is a two-story I-house with a rear ell and Greek Revival and Italianate style design elements. It has a gable roof, segmental arched openings, and sits on a brick foundation. Also on the property are the contributing English barn and shed.

It was added to the National Register of Historic Places in 1995.
