= Danville Main Street Historic District =

Historic district in Indiana, United States

- U.S. National Register of Historic Places
- U.S. Historic district
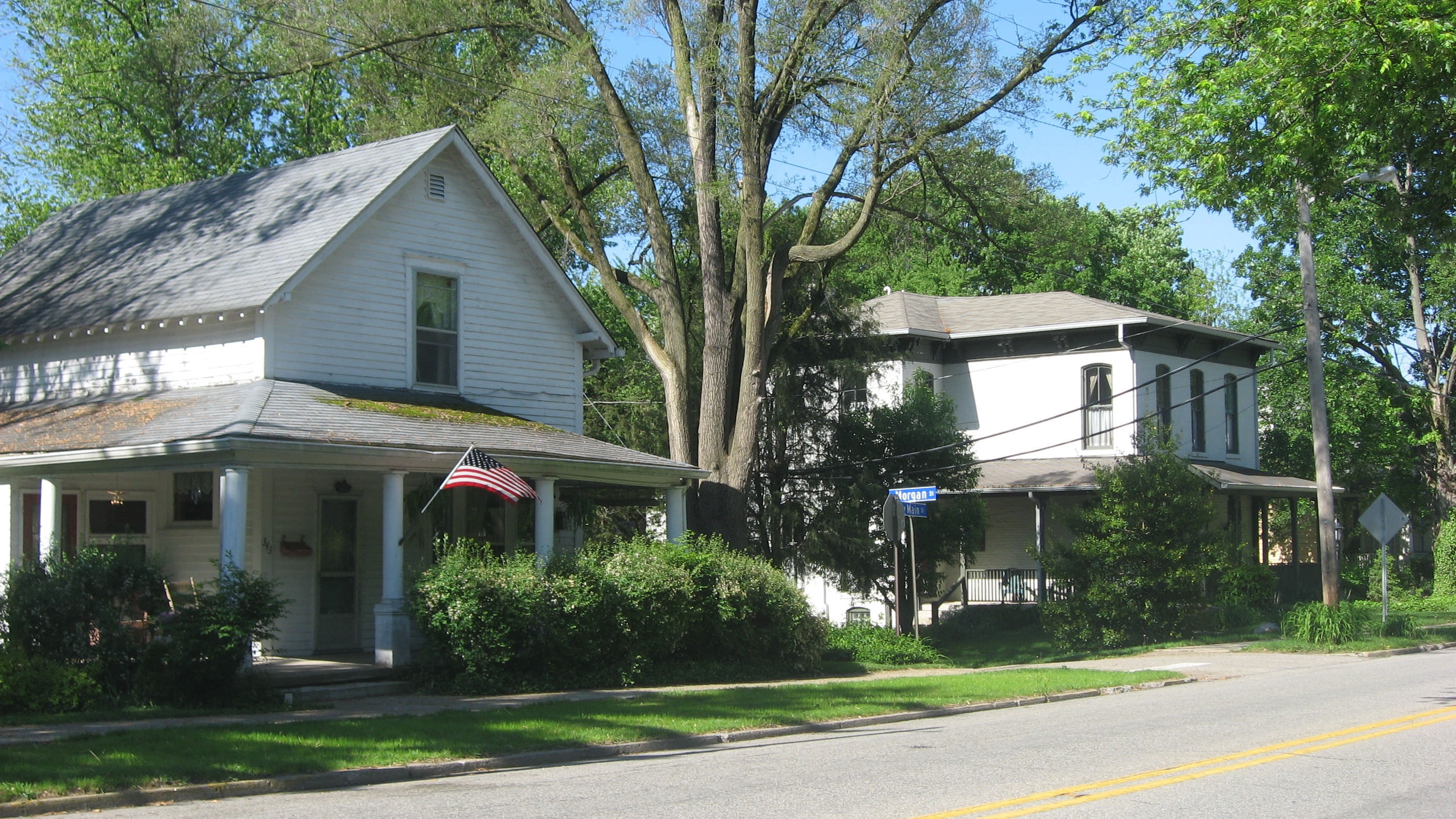
- Danville Main Street Historic District, May 2011

- Location within Indiana Location within the United States
- Location: Bounded by East, Main, Cross, and Marion Sts., Danville, Indiana
- Coordinates: 39°45′37″N 86°31′42″W
- Area: 9 acres (3.6 ha)
- Architectural style: Greek Revival, Queen Anne, American Four Square
- NRHP reference No.: 94001109
- Added to NRHP: September 8, 1994

Danville Main Street Historic District is a national historic district located at Danville, Indiana. The district encompasses 37 contributing buildings in a residential section of Danville. The district developed between about 1844 and 1920 and includes notable examples of Greek Revival, Gothic Revival, Italianate, Queen Anne, American Foursquare, and Bungalow / American Craftsman style architecture. Notable buildings include the Harry Underwood House (1914), J.W. Morgan House (1868), John Shirley House (1885), and the Scearce House (1910).

It was added to the National Register of Historic Places in 1994.

In 2000, a historical marker was erected by Indiana Historical Bureau, Main Street Historical Association of Danville, and Town of Danville.
