= Decatur Township, Marion County, Indiana =

Decatur Township Marion County
- Township
- Seal

- Map of Marion County with Decatur Township highlighted
- Coordinates: 39°41′44″N 86°15′42″W
- Country: United States
- State: Indiana
- County: Marion
- Named after: Stephen Decatur

Government
  - Type: Indiana township

Area
  - Total: 32.4 sq mi (83.9 km^{2})
  - Land: 32.3 sq mi (83.7 km^{2})
  - Water: 0.077 sq mi (0.2 km^{2})
- Elevation: 768 ft (234 m)

Population (2020)
  - Total: 36,951
  - Density: 1,140/sq mi (441/km^{2})
- Time zone: UTC-5 (Eastern (EST))
  - Summer (DST): UTC-4 (EDT)
- FIPS code: 18-17092
- GNIS feature ID: 0453255
- Website: www.in.gov/townships/decatur49/

Decatur Township is one of the nine townships in Marion County, Indiana, United States, and part of the consolidated city of Indianapolis. As of the 2020 census, it had a population of 36,951. Located in the southwest corner of the county, the township is home to the Indianapolis International Airport main terminal. It is one of the most rural sections of the county, but has seen many new residential and commercial developments. AmeriPlex, one of the largest industrial parks in Indiana, is in Decatur Township. Through the White River, Decatur and Perry townships share the only water boundary among Marion County's townships.

== History ==
The township was settled in the 1820s by mostly Quakers from South Carolina. They settled along the banks of the White River. West Newton is a small Quaker-settled town inside the township. Many of today's residents can trace their lineages back to these early settlers.

Decatur Township was named for Stephen Decatur.

== Key information ==
The township is the home of the Decatur Township Civic Council and the Metropolitan School District of Decatur Township. The Indianapolis Challenger Center calls Decatur Township home.

Camby (also sometimes called "West Union Station") is a neighborhood in western Decatur Township that also extends into neighboring Hendricks and Morgan counties, centered along Camby Road near State Road 67. Its elevation is 764 feet (233 m) above sea level, and it is located at 39°39′45″N 86°19′00″W (39.6625457, −86.3166582). Camby has a post office with the ZIP Code of 46113.

== Geography ==
=== Municipalities ===
- Indianapolis (partial)

=== Communities ===
- Airport (south half)
- Ameriplex
- Camby (northeast two thirds)
- Mars Hill (partial)
- Valley Mills
- West Newton

== Demographics ==
Historical population
Census	Pop.	Note	%±
1890	1,555		—
1900	1,550		−0.3%
1910	1,594		2.8%
1920	1,636		2.6%
1930	2,711		65.7%
1940	3,797		40.1%
1950	6,237		64.3%
1960	11,310		81.3%
1970	15,285		35.1%
1980	19,426		27.1%
1990	21,092		8.6%
2000	24,726		17.2%
2010	32,388		31.0%
2020	36,951		14.1%
Source: US Decennial Census

Decatur Township was home to 24,726 residents in the 2000 census. As of the 2010 census, the population had increased to 32,388. By the 2020 census it had reached 36,951. The almost 50% increase between 2000 and 2020 census tabulations ranks Decatur Township second among Marion County's nine townships for population growth.

== Township elected officials ==
- U.S. Congress, District 6: Jefferson Shreve (R)
- Indiana House, District 91: Robert Behning (R)
- Indiana Senate, District 35: R. Michael Young (R)
- Mayor: Joe Hogsett (D)
- City-County Council, District 20: Josh Bain (R)
- Trustee: Jason Holliday (R)
- Small Claims Court Judge: Jonathan Sturgill (R)
- Constable: Luke Schmitt (R)
- Township Board: District 1, Jared Bond (R); District 2, Greg Hibler (R); District 3, Cindy Freund (R); District 4, Josh Masquelier (R); District 5, Anthony Parks (R)
- School Board: Judy Collins, Larry Taylor, Dale Henson, Chase Lyday, Estella Vandeventer
