= List of bridges on the National Register of Historic Places in Indiana =

This is a list of bridges and tunnels on the National Register of Historic Places in the U.S. state of Indiana.

Name	Image	Built	Listed	Location	County	Type
4th Roann Covered Bridge		1877	1981-08-06	Roann; 40°54′55″N 85°55′27″W	Wabash	Howe Truss
Adams Mill Covered Bridge		1872, 1900, ca. 1937	1996-01-11	Cutler; 40°29′1″N 86°30′42″W	Carroll	Howe Truss, Burr Arch
Aqueduct Bridge		1880, 1917, 1920	2000-03-15	Clay City; 39°19′36″N 87°10′46″W	Clay	Pratt through truss
Bachelor Run Steel Truss Bridge		ca 1905	2026-08-31	Burlington; 40°30′38.0″N 86°26′39.2″W	Carroll	Warren pony truss
Beck's Mill Bridge	Beck's Mill Bridge	1922	2007-09-20	Salem; 38°32′14″N 86°9′16″W	Washington	concrete arch
Beeson Bridge	Beeson Covered Bridge	1906	1978-12-22	Marshall; 39°51′35″N 87°11′49″W	Parke	Covered Burr Arch Truss
Bell Ford Post Patented Diagonal "Combination Bridge"	Bell Ford Bridge	by 1885	2005-03-25	Seymour; 38°58′24″N 85°55′46″W	Jackson	Combination Truss
Benville Bridge		1908	1996-07-30	San Jacinto; 38°58′50″N 85°27′10″W	Jennings	stone-arch bridge
Big Rocky Fork Bridge	Big Rocky Fork Bridge	1900	1978-12-22	Mansfield; 39°40′32″N 87°6′6″W	Parke	Covered Burr Arch Truss
Billie Creek Bridge	File:Billie Creek Covered Bridge	1895	1978-12-22	Rockville; 39°45′41″N 87°12′24″W	Parke	Covered Burr Arch Truss
Bowman Creek Stone Arch Culvert		1905	2026-08-31	South Bend; 41°39′52.8″N 86°14′12.0″W	St. Joseph	Stone culvert
Bowsher Ford Bridge	Bowsher Ford Bridge	1915	1978-12-22	Rockville; 39°55′47″N 87°21′6″W	Parke	Covered Burr Arch Truss
Bridge Street Bridge		1939	2009-9-24	Bridge St. over the St. Joseph River; 41°40′37.2″N 85°59′26.58″W	Elkhart	
Bridgeton Bridge	Rebuilt Bridgeton Bridge	1868	1978-12-22	Bridgeton; 39°38′58″N 87°10′34″W	Parke	Covered Burr Arch Truss
Brown County Bridge No. 36	Brown County Bridge	1908	1993-12-21	Nashville; 39°10′59″N 86°18′12″W	Brown	Pratt Through Truss
Camden Paint Creek Concrete Arch Bridge		ca. 1940	2025-03-03	Camden; 40°36′29.5″N 86°31′39.0″W	Carroll	Concrete arch
Carrollton Bridge		1927	2003-06-22	Delphi; 40°38′54″N 86°39′24″W	Carroll	Filled Spandrel
Cataract Covered Bridge	Cataract Falls Bridge	1876	2005-04-27	Cataract; 39°26′0″N 86°48′48″W	Owen	Smith Truss Bridge
Catlin Bridge	Catlin Bridge	1907	1978-12-22	Rockville; 39°47′30″N 87°14′17″W	Parke	Covered Burr Arch Truss
Cavanaugh Bridge	Cavanaugh Bridge	1899	2007-12-19	Brownstown; 38°45′48″N 86°8′12″W	Jackson/Washington	Pratt through truss
Cedar Grove Bridge		1914	2014-09-30	Cedar Grove vicinity 39°21′29″N 84°56′25″W	Franklin	
Center Street Stone & Concrete Arch Bridge		1931	2026-03-02	Bremen; 41°27′04.4″N 86°08′47.5″W	Marshall	Stone and concrete arch
Ceylon Covered Bridge	Ceylon Covered Bridge	1879	2007-01-25	Ceylon; 40°36′51″N 84°56′35″W	Adams	Howe Truss Bridge
Chinworth Bridge		1897	1997-01-02	Warsaw; 41°14′49″N 85°54′38″W	Kosciusko	Pratt through truss
Collin's Ford Bridge		1907	1996-07-30	New Marion; 39°0′29″N 85°22′14″W	Ripley	stone-arched bridge
Conley's Ford Bridge	Conley's Ford Bridge	1907	1978-12-22	Bridgeton; 39°39′34″N 87°7′58″W	Parke	Covered Burr Arch Truss
County Bridge No. 45		1903	2006-09-20	Wheatland; 38°40′47″N 87°16′20″W	Knox/Daviess	Pratt Through Truss
County Line Bridge		1916	1994-11-25	Morristown; 39°42′35″N 85°37′59″W	Hancock/Rush	Parker through-truss
Cox Ford Bridge		1913	1978-12-22	Rockville; 39°53′7″N 87°13′25″W	Parke	Covered Burr Arch Truss
Crooks Bridge	Crooks Bridge	1856	1978-12-22	Bridgeton; 39°43′27″N 87°11′23″W	Parke	Covered Burr Arch Truss
Cumberland Covered Bridge	Cumberland Covered Bridge	1877	1978-05-22	Matthews; 40°23′19″N 85°29′5″W	Grant	
Darlington Covered Bridge		1868	1990-11-28	Darlington; 40°6′29″N 86°47′37″W	Montgomery	Howe truss
Duck Creek Aqueduct		1846	2014-08-25	Metamora Township; 39°26′46.0″N 85°07′48.0″W	Franklin	Covered aqueduct
East Laporte Street Footbridge		1898	1981-07-23	Plymouth; 41°20′25″N 86°18′15″W	Marshall	Z-Span Kingpost
Edward's Ford Bridge		1911	1996-07-30	Nebraska; 39°2′1″N 85°27′38″W	Jennings	stone-arch bridge
Eikenberry Bridge		1920	2006-09-20	Chili; 40°51′19″N 86°3′21″W	Miami	Pratt Through Truss
Eugene Covered Bridge	Eugene Covered Bridge	1873	1994-06-10	Eugene; 39°58′9″N 87°28′23″W	Vermillion	Burr Arch Truss
Feeder Dam Bridge	Feeder Dam Bridge	1894	2000-03-15	Clay City; 39°20′9″N 87°6′49″W	Clay	Whipple through truss
Forsythe Covered Bridge	Forsythe Covered Bridge	1888	1983-02-02	Rushville; 39°31′2″N 85°31′50″W	Rush	Covered Burr Arch Truss System
Fort Wayne Street Bridge	Fort Wayne Street Bridge		2005-09-15	Goshen; 41°35′36″N 85°50′55″W	Elkhart	Pennsylvania truss
Franklin Street Stone Arch Bridge	Franklin Street Stone Arch Bridge	1901	2021-03-01	Delphi; 40°35′01.0″N 86°41′00.6″W	Carroll	Stone arch
Furnas Mill Bridge	Furnas Mill Bridge	1891	2001-09-16	Edinburgh; 39°22′56″N 85°59′53″W	Johnson	Pratt through truss
George Street Bridge		1887	1984-03-01	Aurora; 39°3′29″N 84°53′58″W	Dearborn	Whipple truss
Harmony Way Bridge		1930	2007-10-03	New Harmony	Posey	Pratt Through Truss
Harry Evans Bridge	Harry Evans Bridge	1908	1978-12-22	Mecca; 39°39′43″N 87°17′40″W	Parke	Covered Burr Arch Truss
Hendricks County Bridge Number 316	Hendricks County Bridge No. 316	1886	2003-03-26	Plainfield; 39°41′47″N 86°24′7″W	Hendricks	Pinned Warren
Huffman Mill Covered Bridge		1865	1998-04-01	Fulda; 38°6′14″N 86°46′37″W	Perry/Spencer	Burr arch truss
Indiana State Highway Bridge 42-11-3101		1939	2000-03-15	Poland; 39°26′40″N 86°59′37″W	Clay	Parker through truss
Indiana State Highway Bridge 46-11-1316		1939	2000-03-15	Bowling Green; 39°23′3″N 87°1′14″W	Clay	Pratt through truss
Jackson Bridge	Jackson Bridge	1861	1978-12-22	Rockville; 39°52′48″N 87°16′57″W	Parke	Covered Double Burr Arch
Jeffers Bridge		1905	2000-03-15	Clay City; 39°21′31″N 87°8′32″W	Clay	Pratt Through Truss
Jeffries Ford Bridge	Jeffries Ford Bridge	1915	1978-12-22	Bridgeton; 39°37′49″N 87°12′30″W	Parke	Covered Burr Arch Truss
La Salle Street Bridge		1907	1999-02-18	South Bend; 41°40′45″N 86°14′56″W	St. Joseph	Filled Spandrel Arch
Lake Ditch Bridge		1895, 1926	2001-09-16	Monrovia; 39°34′35″N 86°31′35″W	Morgan	Plate girder bridge
Lamb's Creek Bridge	Lamb's Creek Bridge	1893, 1939	2000-12-28	Martinsville; 39°25′26″N 86°28′31″W	Morgan	Pratt Through Truss
Lancaster Covered Bridge	Lancaster Covered Bridge	1872	2021-03-02	Owasco; 40°28′03.7″N 86°37′01.6″W	Carroll	Covered Howe truss
Laughery Creek Bridge		1868, 1878	1976-09-29	Aurora; 39°1′28″N 84°53′9″W	Dearborn	Triple-intersection Pratt
Leatherwood Station Bridge		1899	1978-12-22	Montezuma; 39°48′54″N 87°17′56″W	Parke	Covered Burr Arch Truss
Little Rock Creek Stone Arch Bridge		1903	2021-03-02	Lockport; 40°41′41.9″N 86°33′24.2″W	Carroll	Stone arch
Lockport Wabash River Bridge		1938	2025-03-03	Lockport; 40°41′37.7″N 86°34′15.2″W	Carroll	Concrete tee
Louisville Municipal Bridge, Pylons and Administration Building		1928, 1929	1984-03-08	Jeffersonville	Clark	Warren through truss; modern-day name George Rogers Clark Memorial Bridge
Madison County Bridge No. 149		ca. 1920	2008-12-8	Pendleton	Madison	
Mansfield Covered Bridge	Mansfield Bridge	1867	1978-12-22	Mansfield; 39°40′32″N 87°6′6″W	Parke	Covered Burr Arch Truss
Marble Creek Bridge		ca. 1905	1996-07-30	San Jacinto; 38°55′39″N 85°26′31″W	Ripley	stone-arch bridge
Marion County Bridge 0501F	Marion County Bridge 0501F	1941, 1942	2006-09-20	Indianapolis; 39°54′43″N 86°6′17″W	Marion	Parker Steel
Marshall Bridge	Marshall Bridge	1917	1978-12-22	Rockville; 39°53′0″N 87°19′35″W	Parke	Covered Burr Arch Truss
McAllister Bridge	McAllister Bridge	1914	1978-12-22	Bridgeton; 39°42′34″N 87°11′30″W	Parke	Covered Burr Arch Truss
Mecca Bridge	Mecca Bridge	1873	1978-12-22	Mecca; 39°43′45″N 87°19′29″W	Parke	Covered Burr Arch Truss
Medora Covered Bridge	Medora Bridge	1875	2007-09-19	Medora; 38°49′6″N 86°8′49″W	Jackson	Burr arch truss
Melcher Bridge	Melcher Bridge	1896	1978-12-22	Montezuma; 39°47′20″N 87°20′6″W	Parke	Covered Burr Arch Truss
Meridian Line Road Iron Truss Bridge		1932	2025-09-09	Camden; 40°36′03.8″N 86°31′30.6″W	Carroll	Warren pony truss
Middle Fork Wildcat Creek Concrete Arch Bridge		1942	2026-08-31	Cutler; 40°26′26.4″N 86°31′30.1″W	Carroll	Concrete arch
Mill Creek Bridge	Mill Creek Bridge	1907	1978-12-22	Rockville; 39°54′30″N 87°21′38″W	Parke	Covered Burr Arch Truss
Moscow Covered Bridge	Moscow Covered Bridge	1886	1983-02-02	Rushville; 39°29′6″N 85°33′17″W	Rush	Covered two Burr Arch Trusses
Narrows Bridge	Narrows Bridge	1882	1978-12-22	Rockville; 39°53′28″N 87°11′7″W	Parke	Covered Burr Arch Truss
Neet Bridge	Neet Bridge	1904	1978-12-22	Bridgeton; 39°42′6″N 87°11′54″W	Parke	Covered Burr Arch Truss
Nevins Bridge	Nevins Bridge	1920	1978-12-22	Bridgeton; 39°41′4″N 87°12′45″W	Parke	Covered Burr Arch Truss
New Hope Bridge		1913	1999-09-09	Columbus; 39°15′34″N 85°55′19″W	Bartholomew	Pratt through truss
Newport Covered Bridge		1885	1994-06-10	Newport; 39°53′28″N 87°26′0″W	Vermillion	Burr Arch Truss
Norris Ford Covered Bridge		1916	1983-02-02	Rushville; 39°38′0″N 85°24′59″W	Rush	Covered Burr Arch Truss System
North Manchester Covered Bridge		1872	1982-09-30	North Manchester; 40°59′45″N 85°45′55″W	Wabash	Smith Type 4 Truss
North Street Viaduct		1935	2023-08-28	Delphi; 40°34′55.9″N 86°40′13.1″W	Carroll	
Offutt Covered Bridge		1884	1983-02-02	Rushville; 39°39′36″N 85°32′22″W	Rush	Covered Burr Arch Truss System
Ohio Street Bridge		1891	1998-12-17	Evansville; 37°58′34″N 87°35′16″W	Vanderburgh	Pratt through Truss
Old Red Covered Bridge		1875	2026-05-27	Griffin; 38°15′29.5″N 87°52′44.9″W	Gibson	Smith truss
Patoka Bridges Historic District	Pike County Wrought Iron Bridge	1884, 1924	2005-03-25	Oakland City	Pike	Pratt through truss
Paw Paw Creek Bridge No. 52		1874	1983-09-30	Chili; 40°52′42″N 85°57′59″W	Miami	Bow-String Arch
Phillips Bridge	Phillips Bridge	1909	1978-12-22	Montezuma; 39°46′20″N 87°19′21″W	Parke	Covered Multiple King Post
Portland Mills Bridge	Portland Mills Bridge	1856, 1970	1978-12-22	Marshall; 39°51′39″N 87°5′20″W	Parke	Covered Burr Arch Truss
Possum Bottom Covered Bridge		1876	1994-06-10	Dana; 39°47′50″N 87°27′12″W	Vermillion	Burr Arch Truss
Potter's Covered Bridge	Potter's Covered Bridge	1871, 1938	1991-12-19	Noblesville; 40°4′21″N 86°0′2″W	Hamilton	Howe Truss
Pugh Ford Bridge	Pugh Ford Bridge	1911	1999-09-09	Taylorsville; 39°20′1″N 85°52′16″W	Bartholomew	Pratt through truss
Putnam County Bridge No. 159	Pulaski County Bridge No. 31	1929	1999-03-12	Reelsville; 39°33′17″N 86°57′51″W	Putnam	Open spandrel
Pyeatt's Mill Iron Bridge	Pyeatt's Mill Iron Bridge	1869	2022-08-23	Hatfield; 37°56′32.3″N 87°15′07.2″W	Warrick	Bowstring truss
Rangeline Road Bridge		1913	1998-04-03	Huntington; 40°52′45″N 85°32′34″W	Huntington	Camelback Through
Richland-Plummer Creek Covered Bridge	Richland-Plummer Creek Covered Bridge	1883	1993-06-10	Bloomfield; 38°59′34″N 86°56′16″W	Greene	Burr Arch Truss
Roseville Bridge	Roseville Bridge	1910	1978-12-22	Mecca; 39°39′9″N 87°17′37″W	Parke	Covered Burr Arch Truss
Rush County Bridge No. 188		1901	2000-12-28	Milroy; 39°30′10″N 85°28′1″W	Rush	Pratt through Truss
Rush Creek Bridge	Rush Creek Bridge	1904	1978-12-22	Rockville; 39°53′56″N 87°18′53″W	Parke	Covered Burr Arch Truss
Scotland Bridge		1901, 1908	1994-03-17	Mechanicsburg; 40°10′36″N 86°25′54″W	Boone and Clinton	true masonry arch
Secrest Ferry Bridge		1903	1996-05-30	Gosport; 39°19′57″N 86°40′35″W	Monroe/Owen	Pennsylvania through truss
Sim Smith Bridge	Sim Smith Bridge	1883	1978-12-22	Montezuma; 39°46′24″N 87°19′52″W	Parke	Covered Burr Arch Truss
Smith Covered Bridge	Smith Covered Bridge	1877	1983-02-02	Rushville; 39°39′19″N 85°24′34″W	Rush	Covered Burr Arch Truss System
Snow Hill Covered Bridge		1895	1995-03-03	Rockdale; 39°19′32″N 84°51′6″W	Franklin	Howe Truss
Spencerville Covered Bridge	Spencerville Covered Bridge	1873	1981-04-02	Spencerville; 41°16′53″N 84°54′51″W	De Kalb	Smith Type 4 Truss
Starke County Bridge No. 39		1915	1993-12-10	Knox; 41°18′1″N 86°37′25″W	Starke	Warren Pony Truss
State Sanitorium Bridge	Sanitorium Bridge	1913	1978-12-22	Rockville; 39°45′56″N 87°9′43″W	Parke	Covered Burr Arch Truss
Stockheughter Covered Bridge		1891	2002-03-20	Batesville; 39°19′59″N 85°16′51″W	Franklin	Howe Truss Covered Bridge
Stone Arch Bridge over McCormick's Creek	Stone Arch Bridge over McCormick's Creek	1934	1993-03-18	Spencer; 39°17′25″N 86°43′1″W	Owen	New Deal Resources in Indiana State Parks MPSPark Rustic
Thorpe Ford Bridge	Thorpe Ford Bridge	1912	1978-12-22	Mecca; 39°38′14″N 87°15′54″W	Parke	Covered Burr Arch Truss
Twin Bridges		by 1870, 1887, 1906	2000-03-15	Danville; 39°45′15″N 86°30′15″W	Hendricks	Wrought-Iron Baltimore through
Wabash and Erie Canal Culvert No. 100		1840	2002-03-20	Lockport; 40°42′11″N 86°34′2″W	Carroll	masonry arch
Washington Street Stone Arch Bridge	Washington Street Stone Arch Bridge	1901	2021-03-01	Delphi; 40°35′33.7″N 86°40′44.0″W	Carroll	Stone arch
Water Street/Darden Road Bridge		1885, 1906	1985-03-21	South Bend; 41°43′49″N 86°16′7″W	St. Joseph	Pratt through truss
Wells Street Bridge	Wells Street Bridge	1884	1988-09-15	Fort Wayne; 41°5′13″N 85°8′27″W	Allen	Whipple Truss
West Union Bridge	West Union Bridge	1876	1978-12-22	Montezuma; 39°51′18″N 87°20′9″W	Parke	Covered Burr Arch Truss
West Washington Street Bridge	West Washington Street Bridge	1930	2008-03-19	Muncie; 40°11′42″N 85°23′29″W	Delaware	Concrete Arch
Westport Covered Bridge		1880, 1922	1982-06-25	Westport; 39°10′1″N 85°32′47″W	Decatur	Burr Arch
Wheeling Covered Bridge		1877	2026-05-27	Wheeling; 38°24′43.6″N 87°27′26.3″W	Gibson	Smith truss
Wildcat Creek Steel Truss Bridge		1948	2026-08-31	Cutler; 40°28′54.1″N 86°31′48.1″W	Carroll	Parker through truss
Wilkins Mill Bridge	Wilkins Mill Bridge	1906	1978-12-22	Rockville; 39°53′54″N 87°13′59″W	Parke	Covered Burr Arch Truss
Williams Bridge	Williams Bridge	1884	1981-11-09	Williams; 38°47′48″N 86°39′54″W	Lawrence	Howe Truss
Wilson Bridge	Wilson Bridge	1897	2001-06-06	Delphi; 40°35′27″N 86°37′16″W	Carroll	Pratt through truss
Zacke Cox Bridge	Zacke Cox Bridge	1908	1978-12-22	Mecca; 39°41′43″N 87°17′9″W	Parke	Covered Burr Arch Truss
Brouilletts Creek Covered Bridge		1879	removed 1999-06-02	Clinton	Vermillion	Burr Arch Truss
Brownsville Covered Bridge	Brownsville Covered Bridge	1837, 1840	removed 1974-01-01	Brownsville	Union	Long truss
Burton Lane Bridge		1872, 1899, 1900	removed 2004-06-01	Martinsville	Morgan	Davenport Howe Truss
Coal Creek Bridge		1869	removed 1992-11-30	Cayuga	Parke	Covered Burr Arch Truss
Ferree Covered Bridge		1873	removed 1990-01-19	Rushville	Rush	Covered Burr Arch Truss System
Germany Bridge		1879	removed 1980-03-28	Rochester	Fulton	
Hursh Road Bridge (Bridge No. 38)		1879	removed 1993-05-25	Cedarville	Allen	Pratt (Whipple)through Tr
Pulaski County Bridge No. 31		1905, 1914	removed 2014-10-01	Delphi; 41°3′33″N 86°49′46″W	Carroll	Stearns Truss
J.H. Russell Bridge		1897	removed 1990-02-20	Rockville	Parke	Covered Queen Post Construction
Jessup Bridge		1910, 1970	removed 1990-02-20	Rockville	Parke	Covered Burr Arch Truss
Longwood Covered Bridge		1884	removed 1989-01-25	Connersville	Fayette	Burr Arch Truss
