= List of covered bridges in Indiana =

This is a list of Indiana covered bridges. There are 86 historic wooden covered bridges in the U.S. state of Indiana. Thirteen of these were built before 1870 and represent the most common truss styles (Burr Arch) in Indiana.

Parke County bills itself as the covered bridge capital of the world. Combined with six counties that surround it, there are 50 of Indiana's 86 covered bridges in this small area: Parke County (31), Putnam County (9), Fountain County (3), Vermillion County (3), Montgomery County (2), Owen County (1) and Vigo County (1). The majority, 53, are Burr Arch truss designs, while the next most common truss style is a Howe truss with 23.

One each of the older style King Post and Queen Post are located in the western part of the state; Philips Bridge, west of Rockville in Parke County and Irishman Bridge, south of Terre Haute in Vigo County, respectively. Indiana also has examples of the Long Truss and the Smith Type IV Truss. The remaining span of the Bell Ford Bridge, northwest of Seymour in Jackson County, collapsed in January 2006. It was the last standing example of a Post Truss covered bridge in the world.

== List of covered bridges ==
=== Extant ===
Name	Image	Location^{[A]}	Year built	Length	Crosses	Design	Historical notes
Adams Mill Bridge		Cutler, Carroll County	1872	138 feet (42 m)	Wildcat Creek	Howe truss	
Baker's Camp Bridge		Bainbridge, Putnam County	1901	128 feet (39 m)	Big Walnut Creek	Burr Arch	
Bean Blossom Bridge		Beanblossom, Brown County	1880	60 feet (18 m)	Beanblossom Creek	Modified Howe	
Beeson Bridge		Billie Creek Village, Rockville, Parke County	1906	55 feet (17 m)		Burr Arch	
Big Rocky Fork Bridge		Mansfield, Parke County	1900	72 feet (22 m)	Big Rocky Fork Creek	Burr Arch	
Billie Creek Bridge		Billie Creek Village, Rockville, Parke County	1895	62 feet (19 m)		Burr Arch	Moved to serve as the entrance to Billie Creek Village.
Bowsher Ford Bridge		Tangier, Parke County	1915	72 feet (22 m)	Mill Creek	Burr Arch	
Bridgeton Bridge (new)		Bridgeton, Parke County	2006	245 feet (75 m)	Big Raccoon Creek	Burr Arch	Replaced original bridge that was destroyed by fire in 2005 with reconstruction completed in October 2006.
Busching Bridge		Versailles, Ripley County	1885	176 feet (54 m)	Laugher Creek	Howe truss	Located at Versailles State Park.
Cades Mill Bridge		Steam Corner, Fountain County	1854	150 feet (46 m)	Coal Creek	Howe truss	Oldest bridge in the state
Cataract Falls Bridge		Cataract, Owen County	1876	140 feet (43 m)	Mill Creek	Smith Type IV Truss	
Catlin Bridge		Rockville, Parke County	1907	54 feet (16 m)	Bill Diddle Creek	Burr Arch	
Cedar Ford Bridge		Bean Blossom, Monroe County	2019	127 feet (39 m)	Beanblossom Creek	Burr Arch	
Ceylon Bridge		Ceylon, Adams County	1879	126 feet (38 m)	Wabash River	Howe truss	
Conley's Ford Bridge		Mansfield, Parke County	1907	192 feet (59 m)	Big Raccoon Creek	Burr Arch	
Cornstalk Bridge		Raccoon, Putnam County	1917	82 feet (25 m)	Cornstalk Creek	Burr Arch	
Cox Ford Bridge		Annapolis, Parke County	1913	176 feet (54 m)	Sugar Creek	Burr Arch	Located at the west side of Turkey Run State Park.
Crooks Bridge		Rockville, Parke County	1856	132 feet (40 m)	Little Raccoon Creek	Burr Arch	Second oldest bridge in the state
Crown Point Bridge		Crown Point, Lake County	1878	85 feet (26 m)	Gully	Burr Arch	Moved to Lake County Fairgrounds in 1933 from Milroy in Rush County over the Little Flatrock River.
Cumberland Bridge		Matthews, Grant County	1877	175 feet (53 m)	Mississinewa River	Howe truss	
Darlington Bridge		Darlington, Montgomery County	1868	140 feet (43 m)	Sugar Creek	Howe truss	Fourth oldest covered bridge in the state and has a unique wooden block floor that spans its length as shown in the picture.
Deer's Mills Bridge		Deer's Mill, Montgomery County	1878	275 feet (84 m)	Sugar Creek	Burr Arch	Located in Shades State Park.
Dick Huffman Bridge		Reelsville, Putnam County	1880	265 feet (81 m)	Big Walnut River	Howe truss	Longest Howe Truss bridge in the state
Dunbar Bridge		Greencastle, Putnam County	1880	174 feet (53 m)	Big Walnut Creek	Burr Arch	Two spans
Edna Collins Bridge		Clinton Falls, Putnam County	1922	80 feet (24 m)	Little Walnut Creek	Burr Arch	Local legends claim this bridge is haunted.
Eugene Bridge		Eugene, Vermillion County	1885	192 feet (59 m)	Vermillion River	Burr Arch	
Forsythe Mill Bridge	Forsythe Covered Bridge	Gowdy, Rush County	1888	196 feet (60 m)	Big Flat Rock River	Burr Arch	Built by Emmett L. Kennedy
Guilford Bridge		Guilford, Dearborn County	1879	104 feet (32 m)		Burr Arch	
Harry Evans Bridge	Harry Evans Bridge	Coxville, Parke County	1908	65 feet (20 m)	Rock Run Creek	Burr Arch	
Hillsdale Bridge		Dana, Vermillion County	1876	104 feet (32 m)		Burr Arch	
Holton Bridge		Holton, Ripley County	1884	112 feet (34 m)	Otter Creek	Howe truss	
Houck Bridge		Manhattan, Putnam County	1880	210 feet (64 m)	Big Walnut Creek	Howe truss	Located at 39°34′56″N 86°56′22″W, it is one of the longest Howe Truss bridges in the state. The status of its name is unofficial.
Huffman's Mill Bridge		Huffman, Spencer County	1884	140 feet (43 m)	Anderson River	Burr Arch	
Indiana State Fair Bridge		Indiana State Fairgrounds, Indianapolis, Marion County	2008	90 feet (27 m)	Driveway	Burr Arch	Modeled after Parke County's Bridgeton Bridge
Irishman Bridge		Youngstown, Vigo County	ca. 1847	75 feet (23 m)	Fowler Lake, branch of Honey Creek	Queen Post	Second oldest and only remaining Queen Post covered bridge in the state
Jackson Bridge		Annapolis, Parke County	1861	207 feet (63 m)	Sugar Creek	Burr Arch	Fifth oldest and longest single span covered bridge in the state
James Bridge		Lovett, Jennings County	1887	124 feet (38 m)	Big Graham Creek	Howe truss	
Lancaster Bridge		Owasco, Carroll County	1872	133 feet (41 m)	Wildcat Creek	Howe truss	
Leatherwood Station Bridge		Billie Creek Village, Rockville, Parke County	1899	72 feet (22 m)		Burr Arch	
Longwood Bridge		Connersville, Fayette County	1884	92 feet (28 m)		Burr Arch	
Mansfield Bridge		Mansfield, Parke County	1867	247 feet (75 m)	Big Raccoon Creek	Burr Arch	Three spans, central roof was torn off by winds in the spring of 2006 and restored in 2007.
Marshall Bridge		Tangier, Parke County	1917	56 feet (17 m)	Rush Creek	Burr Arch	
McAllister Bridge		Catlin, Parke County	1914	126 feet (38 m)	Little Raccoon Creek	Burr Arch	
Mecca Bridge		Mecca, Parke County	1873	150 feet (46 m)	Big Raccoon Creek	Burr Arch	
Medora Bridge		Medora, Jackson County	1875	434 feet (132 m)	East Fork, White River	Burr Arch	Three spans, longest covered bridge in the state and, by clear span, is sometimes claimed to be the longest historic covered bridge in the U.S. Closed to all but pedestrian traffic since 1972, and is currently undergoing restoration.
Melcher Bridge		Montezuma, Parke County	1896	83 feet (25 m)	Leatherwood Creek	Burr Arch	
Mill Creek Bridge		Tangier, Parke County	1907	92 feet (28 m)	Mill Creek	Burr Arch	
Moscow Bridge		Moscow, Rush County	1886 (rebuilt 2010)	334 feet (102 m)	Big Flat Rock River	Burr Arch	Two spans, third longest covered bridge in the state; destroyed by a tornado in 2008, it has since been rebuilt.
Narrows Bridge		Marshall, Parke County	1882	121 feet (37 m)	Sugar Creek	Burr Arch	Located on the east boundary of Turkey Run State Park.
Neet Bridge		Catlin, Parke County	1904	126 feet (38 m)	Little Raccoon Creek	Burr Arch	
Nevins Bridge		Catlin, Parke County	1920	155 feet (47 m)	Little Raccoon Creek	Burr Arch	
New Brownsville Bridge		Columbus, Bartholomew County	1840	93 feet (28 m)	Mill Run Creek	Long Truss	Moved from Brownsville in Union County over the Whitewater River.
Newport Bridge		Newport, Vermillion County	1885	180 feet (55 m)	Little Vermillion River	Burr Arch	
Norris Ford Bridge		Rushville, Rush County	1916	169 feet (52 m)	Big Flat Rock River	Burr Arch	
North Manchester Bridge		North Manchester, Wabash County	1872	150 feet (46 m)	Eel River	Smith Type IV Truss	
Oakalla Bridge		Greencastle, Putnam County	1875	152 feet (46 m)	Big Walnut Creek	Burr Arch	
Old Red Bridge		Hickory Ridge, Gibson County	1875	170 feet (52 m)	Big Bayou Creek	Smith Type IV Truss	
Pine Bluff Bridge		Carpentersville, Putnam County	1915	211 feet (64 m)	Big Walnut Creek	Howe truss	
Phillips Bridge		Montezuma, Parke County	1909	43 feet (13 m)	Big Pond Creek	King Post	Shortest covered bridge in the state
Portland Mills Bridge		Guion, Parke County	1856	130 feet (40 m)	Little Raccoon Creek	Burr Arch	Tied with Crooks Bridge as the fourth oldest covered bridge in the state.
Possum Bottom Bridge		Helt Township, Vermillion County	1876	131 feet (40 m)	Gully	Burr Arch	
Potter's Covered Bridge	Potter's Covered Bridge	Noblesville, Hamilton County	1871	259 feet (79 m)	West Fork, White River	Howe truss	
Ramp Creek Bridge		Nashville, Brown County	1838	96 feet (29 m)	Salt Creek	Double Barreled Burr Arch	Oldest and only two-lane covered bridge in the state; located at the entrance to Brown County State Park.
Richland Creek Bridge		Bloomfield, Greene County	1883	100 feet (30 m)	Richland Creek	Burr Arch	Built by A.M. Kennedy and Sons
Roann Bridge		Roann, Wabash County	1872	288 feet (88 m)	Eel River	Howe truss	
Rob Roy Bridge		Rob Roy, Fountain County	1860	120 feet (37 m)	Big Shawnee Creek	Howe truss	
Rolling Stone Bridge		Bainbridge, Putnam County	1915	103 feet (31 m)	Big Walnut Creek	Burr Arch	
Roseville-Coxville Bridge		Coxville, Parke County	1910	263 feet (80 m)	Big Raccoon Creek	Burr Arch	
Rush Creek Bridge		Tangier, Parke County	1904	77 feet (23 m)	Rush Creek	Burr Arch	
Salem Crossing Bridge		Zionsville, Boone County	1972	?	Fishback Creek	Howe truss	
Sanatorium Bridge		Rockville, Parke County	1913	154 feet (47 m)	Little Raccoon Creek	Burr Arch	
Scipio Bridge		Scipio, Jennings County	1886	146 feet (45 m)	Sand Creek	Howe truss	
Shieldstown Bridge		Shields, Jackson County	1876	331 feet (101 m)	East Fork, White River	Burr Arch	
Sim Smith Bridge		Montezuma, Parke County	1883	84 feet (26 m)	Leatherwood Creek	Burr Arch	
Smith Bridge	Smith Covered Bridge	Rushville, Rush County	1877	138 feet (42 m)	Big Flat Rock River	Burr Arch	
Snow Hill Bridge		Rockdale, Franklin County	1895	75 feet (23 m)	Johnson Fork, Whitewater River	Howe truss	
South Hill Bridge		Universal, Vermillion County	1879	122 feet (37 m)	Brouilletts Creek	Burr Arch	
Spencerville Covered Bridge	Spencerville Covered Bridge	Spencerville, DeKalb County	1873	160 feet (49 m)	St. Joseph River	Howe truss	
Stockheughter Bridge		Enochsburg, Franklin County	1887	92 feet (28 m)	Salt Creek	Howe truss	
Thorpe Ford Bridge		Rosedale, Parke County	1912	163 feet (50 m)	Big Raccoon Creek	Burr Arch	
Traders Point Bridge		Indianapolis, Marion County	1880	89 feet (27 m)	Fishback Creek	Howe truss	
Vermont Bridge		Kokomo, Howard County	1875	98 feet (30 m)	Kokomo Creek	Smith Type IV Truss	Moved from its original location to Highland Park in Kokomo.
Wallace Bridge		Wallace, Fountain County	1871	81 feet (25 m)	Sugar Mill Creek	Howe truss	
West Union Bridge		West Union, Parke County	1876	315 feet (96 m)	Sugar Creek	Burr Arch	
Westport Bridge		Westport, Decatur County	1880	115 feet (35 m)	Sand Creek	Burr Arch	
Wheeling Bridge		Wheeling, Gibson County	1877	164 feet (50 m)	Patoka River	Smith Type IV Truss	
White Water Canal Aqueduct Bridge		Metamora, Franklin County	1846	81 feet (25 m)	Duck Creek	Burr Arch	Located on the east side of Metamora.
Wilkins Mill Bridge		Annapolis, Parke County	1906	102 feet (31 m)	Sugar Mill Creek	Burr Arch	
Williams Bridge		Williams, Lawrence County	1884	373 feet (114 m)	East Fork, White River	Howe truss	Two spans, second longest covered bridge in the state
Zacke Cox Bridge		Coxville, Parke County	1908	54 feet (16 m)	Rock Run Creek	Burr Arch	

=== Nonextant ===
Name	Image	Location^{[A]}	Year built	Length	Crosses	Design	Historical notes
Bell Ford Bridge (old)		Seymour, Jackson County	1869	330 feet (100 m)	East Fork, White River	Post Truss	Western span collapsed in 1999, while the remaining eastern span collapsed in 2006. It was the fourth longest and fifth oldest covered bridge in the state.
Bridgeton Bridge (old)		Bridgeton, Parke County	1868	245 feet (75 m)	Big Raccoon Creek	Burr Arch	Destroyed in April 2005
Clinton Bridge		Clinton, Vermillion County	1852	735 feet (224 m)	Wabash River		Four spans, removed in 1899
Jeffries Ford Bridge		Bridgeton, Parke County	1915	200 feet (61 m)	Big Raccoon Creek	Burr Arch	Destroyed in April 2002

=== Notes ===
- ^{A} Sorting this column will result in bridges being listed in order by county.

== See also ==
- List of bridges documented by the Historic American Engineering Record in Indiana
- List of bridges on the National Register of Historic Places in Indiana
- World Guide to Covered Bridges
