= Zacke Cox Covered Bridge =

Place in Indiana listed on National Register of Historic Places

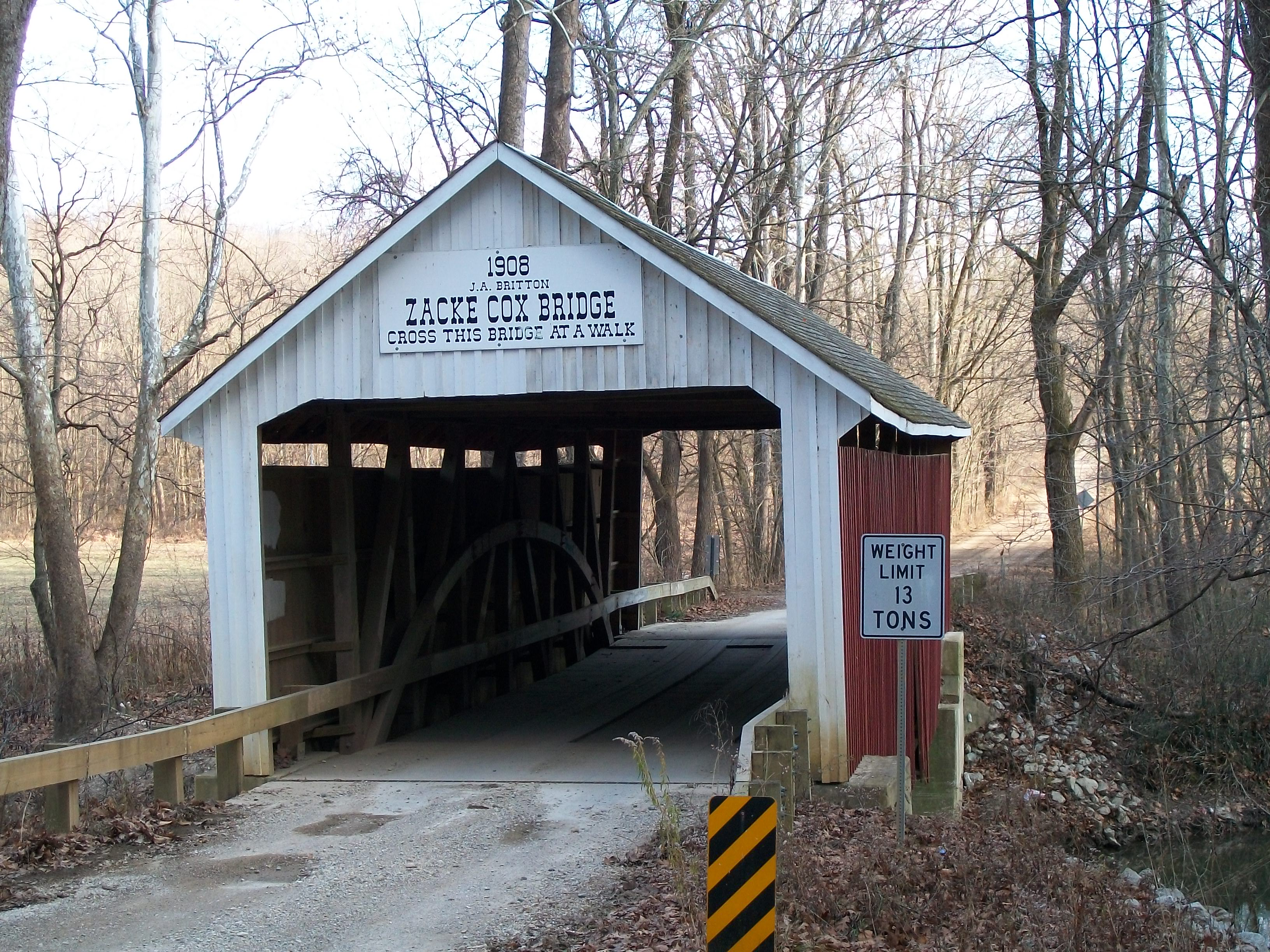
- Zacke Cox Covered Bridge
- Coordinates: 39°41′42.42″N 87°17′9.44″W
- Carries: Tickridge Road
- Crosses: Rock Run Creek
- Locale: Parke County, Indiana, United States
- Official name: Zacke Cox Covered Bridge
- Named for: Zachariah M. Cox
- Maintained by: Parke County
- NBI Number: 6100051

Characteristics
- Design: National Register of Historic Places
- Total length: 72 ft (22 m)54ft +9ft overhangs on each end
- Width: 15 ft (4.6 m)
- Height: 14 ft (4.3 m)

History
- Constructed by: Britton, J.A.
- Built: 1908
- Rebuilt: 1989, 1991 $6,000, 2002
- Zacke Cox Covered Bridge
- U.S. National Register of Historic Places
- MPS: Parke County Covered Bridges TR
- NRHP reference No.: 78000416
- Added to NRHP: December 22, 1978

Location
- Interactive map of Zacke Cox Covered Bridge

The Zacke Cox Covered Bridge is east of Mecca, Indiana. The single span Burr Arch Truss covered bridge structure was built by Joseph A. Britton in 1908.

It was added to the National Register of Historic Places in 1978.

== History ==
Zachariah M. Cox was born in almost due north of this bridge in Coloma in 1857. His father was E.T. Cox and his family was quite prominent in Parke County with various family members owning nearly 1000 acres of land near the bridge.

Northwest of the mine is an old clay strip mine and coal and slate outcroppings can be viewed south of the bridge.

This bridge, along with the Harry Evans Covered Bridge and the Weisner Covered Bridge, all built by J.A. Britton, lack the traditional Britton Portals. Instead, they have a more semi-arched portal that more resembles the Hendricks Portals of the Wilkins Mill Covered Bridge or the Rush Creek Covered Bridge.

== See also ==
- List of Registered Historic Places in Indiana
- Parke County Covered Bridges
- Parke County Covered Bridge Festival
