= National Register of Historic Places listings in Starke County, Indiana =

Location of Starke County in Indiana

This is a list of the National Register of Historic Places listings in Starke County, Indiana.

This is intended to be a complete list of the properties and districts on the National Register of Historic Places in Starke County, Indiana, United States. Latitude and longitude coordinates are provided for many National Register properties and districts; these locations may be seen together in a map.

There are three properties and districts listed on the National Register in the county.

Properties and districts located in incorporated areas display the name of the municipality, while properties and districts in unincorporated areas display the name of their civil township. Properties and districts split between multiple jurisdictions display the names of all jurisdictions.

This National Park Service list is complete through NPS recent listings posted December 19, 2025.

== Current listings ==
	Name on the Register	Image	Date listed	Location	City or town	Description
1	Chesapeake & Ohio 2-8-4 Steam Engine No. 2789		August 28, 2024 (#100010742)	Hoosier Valley Railroad Museum, 507 Mulberry St. 41°13′13″N 86°46′26″W	North Judson	
2	Starke County Bridge No. 39	Starke County Bridge No. 39	December 10, 1993 (#93001413)	Junction of Main and Water Sts., across the former New York Central Railroad cut 41°18′01″N 86°37′25″W	Knox	
3	Starke County Courthouse	Starke County Courthouse	November 12, 1986 (#86003170)	Courthouse Sq. 41°17′56″N 86°37′21″W	Knox	

== See also ==
- List of National Historic Landmarks in Indiana
- National Register of Historic Places listings in Indiana
- Listings in neighboring counties: Fulton, Jasper, LaPorte, Marshall, Porter, Pulaski, St. Joseph
- List of Indiana state historical markers in Starke County
