= Rush Creek Covered Bridge =

Place in Indiana listed on National Register of Historic Places

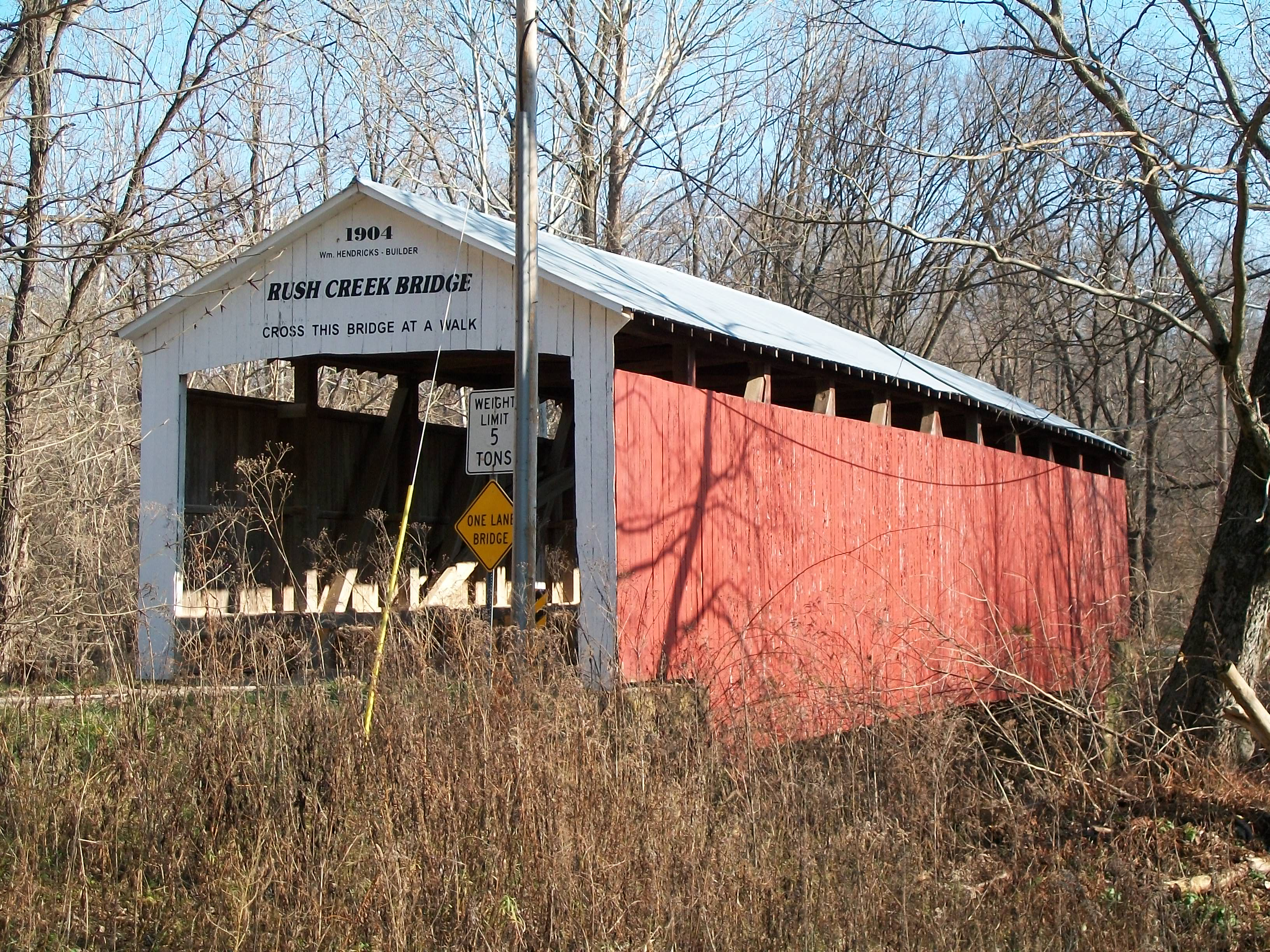
- Rush Creek Covered Bridge
- Coordinates: 39°53′55.54″N 87°18′52.75″W
- Carries: C.R. 900N
- Crosses: Rush Creek
- Locale: Parke County, Indiana, United States
- Official name: Rush Creek Covered Bridge
- Named for: Rush Creek
- Maintained by: Parke County
- NBI Number: 6100154

Characteristics
- Design: National Register of Historic Places
- Total length: 95 ft (29 m)77ft +9ft overhangs on each end
- Width: 16 ft (4.9 m)
- Height: 12.5 ft (3.8 m)

History
- Constructed by: Hendricks, William
- Built: 1904
- Rebuilt: 1977
- Rush Creek Covered Bridge
- U.S. National Register of Historic Places
- MPS: Parke County Covered Bridges TR
- NRHP reference No.: 78000410
- Added to NRHP: Dec 22, 1978

Location
- Interactive map of Rush Creek Covered Bridge

The Rush Creek Covered Bridge is south of Tangier, Indiana. The single span Burr Arch covered bridge structure was built by William Hendricks in 1904.

It was added to the National Register of Historic Places in 1978.

== History ==
This is the first of three bridges that would be built by William Hendricks. The other two are Wilkins Mill Covered Bridge, 1906, and Mill Creek Covered Bridge, 1907. All three are of similar construction with very shallow portals.

== Gallery ==
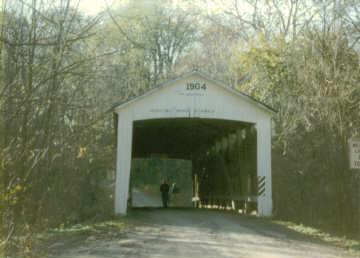
Rush Creek Covered Bridge, circa 1990

== See also ==
- List of Registered Historic Places in Indiana
- Parke County Covered Bridges
- Parke County Covered Bridge Festival
