= Burton Lane Bridge =

- Formerly listed on the U.S. National Register of Historic Places
- Location within Indiana Location within the United States
- Nearest city: Martinsville, Indiana
- Area: less than one acre
- Built: 1872
- Architect: Davenport, Joseph; Massillon Iron Bridge Company
- Architectural style: Davenport Howe Truss
- NRHP reference No.: 97000302

Significant dates
- Added to NRHP: April 14, 1997
- Removed from NRHP: June 1, 2004

Burton Lane Bridge, also known as Sheerer Bridge and Bruce Ford Bridge, was a historic Howe truss located near Martinsville, Indiana. It was built in 1872 by the Massillon Iron Bridge Company. It was a single span bridge measuring 99 feet long and 16 feet wide. It was destroyed by an overweight dump truck in May, 1997.

It was listed on the National Register of Historic Places in 1997 and delisted in 2004.
