= McAllister Covered Bridge =

Registered Historic Place in Indiana, U.S.

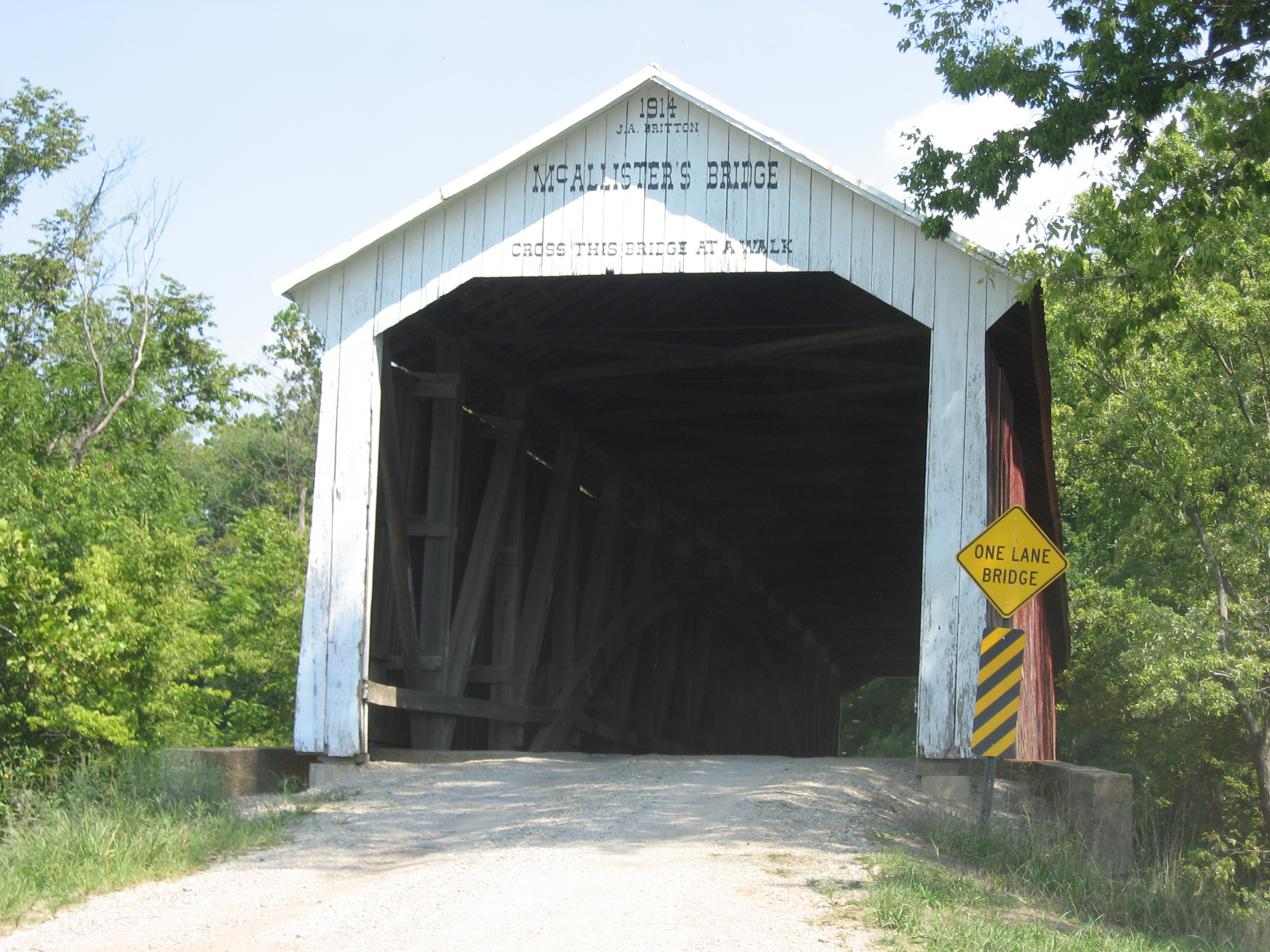
- Coordinates: 39.7097°N 87.1935°W
- Carries: C.R. 400S
- Crosses: Little Raccoon Creek
- Locale: Adams Township, Parke County, Indiana
- Official name: McAllister Covered Bridge
- Named for: James D. McAllister
- Owner: Parke County Commissioners; Parke County
- NBI Number: 6100068

Characteristics
- Design: Burr Arch truss single-span bridge
- Material: Wood
- Total length: 144 feet (44 m)
- Width: 16 feet (4.9 m)
- Height: 14 feet (4.3 m)

History
- Constructed by: Joseph A. Britton
- Opened: 1914
- Rebuilt: 1977
- McAllister Covered Bridge
- U.S. National Register of Historic Places
- U.S. Historic district – Contributing property
- MPS: Parke County Covered Bridges TR
- NRHP reference No.: 78000398
- Added to NRHP: December 22, 1978

Location
- Interactive map of McAllister Covered Bridge

The McAllister Covered Bridge is a Burr Arch structure that was built by Joseph A. Britton and Son in 1914. It is 144 feet (44 m) long, 16 feet (4.9 m) wide, and 14 feet (4.3 m) high. It is found in Adams Township, Parke County, Indiana, United States.

It was added to the National Register of Historic Places in 1978.

== Gallery ==
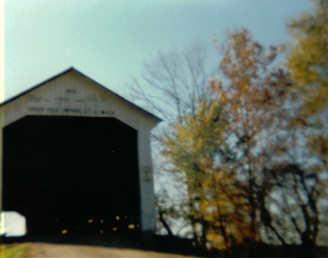

== See also ==
- List of Registered Historic Places in Indiana
- Parke County Covered Bridges
- Parke County Covered Bridge Festival
