= Ohio Street Bridge =

- U.S. National Register of Historic Places
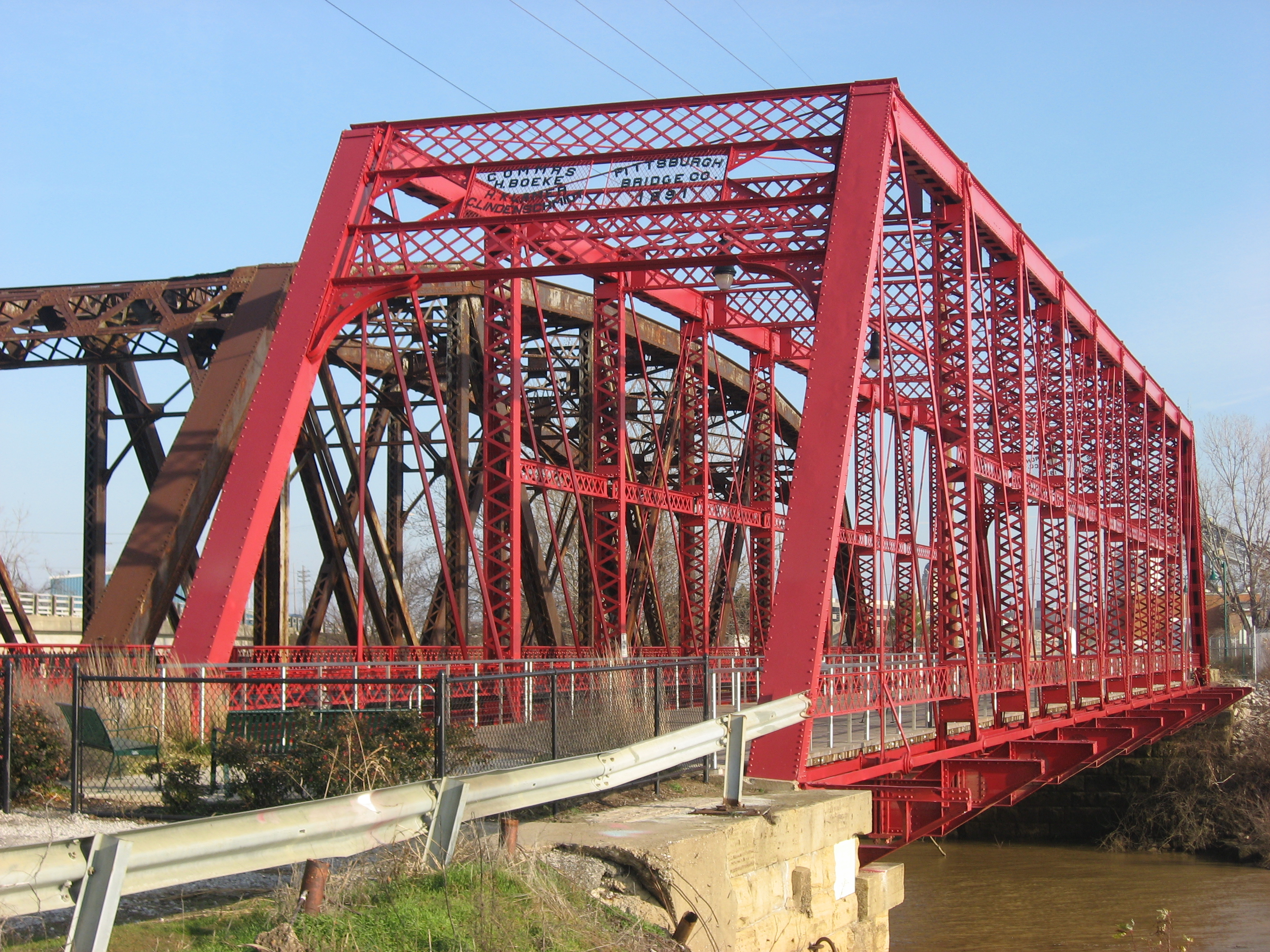
- Ohio Street Bridge, December 2011

- Location within Indiana Location within the United States
- Location: Ohio St. over Pigeon Cr., Evansville, Indiana
- Coordinates: 37°58′34″N 87°35′16″W
- Area: less than one acre
- Built: 1891
- Built by: Pittsburgh Bridge Company; Eigenmann & Hoolerbach
- Architectural style: Pratt through Truss
- NRHP reference No.: 98001523
- Added to NRHP: December 17, 1998

Ohio Street Bridge, also known as the Joan Marchand Overlook, is a historic Pratt through Truss bridge located at Evansville, Indiana. It was built in 1891 by the Pittsburgh Bridge Company and the sandstone abutments constructed by Eigenmann & Hoolerbach. It is a single span steel truss bridge and measures 198 feet long and 24 feet wide. It is closed to vehicular traffic but is used by pedestrian traffic.

It was added to the National Register of Historic Places in 1998.
