= Mill Creek Covered Bridge =

Place in Indiana listed on National Register of Historic Places

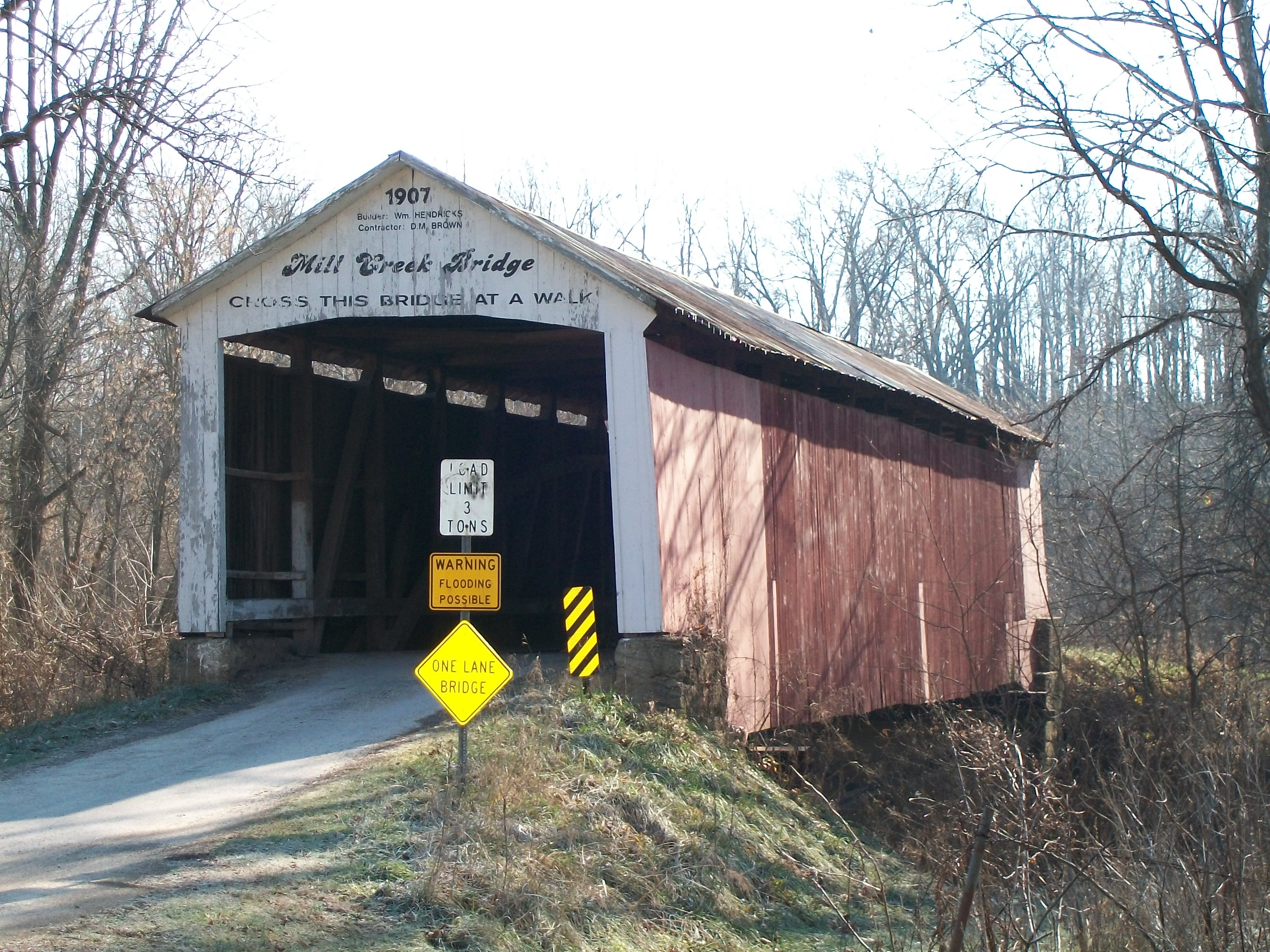
- Coordinates: 39°54′30.79″N 87°21′39.15″W
- Carries: Towpath Road
- Crosses: Mill Creek, Indiana
- Locale: Parke County, Indiana, United States
- Official name: Mill Creek Covered Bridge
- Other name(s): Thompson’s Ford, Tow Path Bridge, and Earl Ray Bridge
- Named for: Mill Creek
- Maintained by: Parke County
- NBI Number: 6100152

Characteristics
- Design: National Register of Historic Places
- Total length: 112 ft (34 m)92ft +10ft overhangs on each end
- Width: 15 ft (4.6 m)
- Height: 15 ft (4.6 m)

History
- Constructed by: Hendricks, William; D.M. Brown, Contractor
- Built: 1907
- Mill Creek Covered Bridge
- U.S. National Register of Historic Places
- MPS: Parke County Covered Bridges TR
- NRHP reference No.: 78000403
- Added to NRHP: Dec 22, 1978

Location
- Interactive map of Mill Creek Covered Bridge

The Mill Creek Covered Bridge also known as "Thompson's Ford Covered Bridge," "Tow Path Covered Bridge," or "Earl Ray Covered Bridge" crosses Wabash Mill Creek (historic) southwest of Tangier, Indiana. It is a single span Burr Arch Truss covered bridge structure that was built by D. M. Brown in 1907.

It was added to the National Register of Historic Places in 1978.

== History ==
The bridge crosses Mill Creek near land that was owned by Thornton Thompson. Though Thompson's Ford was probably named after Joseph Thompson who built a small mill nearby in 1829. It's also been suggested that Earl Ray Covered Bridge comes from a prominent nearby citizen and well known auctioneer. The name Tow Path Covered Bridge comes from the fact that Tow Path Road crosses the bridge. The Wabash and Erie Canal crossed Mill Creek just to the south of where the bridge is built. The towpath for the canal was later turned into a road, south of the bridge where the canal ran parallel to the current road, when the canal was discontinued. The actual towpath wasn't near the bridge however. The canal had been out of use for many years by the time the bridge was built but an aqueduct that crossed the creek was occasionally used as a bridge after the canal was drained.

Joseph J. Daniels had sent in a bid for the bridge on May 18, 1899, for $1,485 for the superstructure or $2,520 including the abutments. D.M. Brown was awarded the contract so apparently his bid was for less. However, Mr. Brown had so much trouble getting the bridge started that he had to hire William Hendricks, who had more experience, for the direct construction.

== Gallery ==
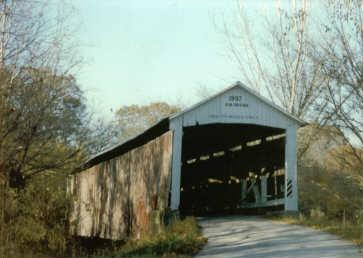
Mill Creek Bridge Circa 1990

== See also ==
- National Register of Historic Places listings in Indiana
- Parke County Covered Bridges
- Parke County Covered Bridge Festival
