= Sim Smith Covered Bridge =

Place in Indiana listed on National Register of Historic Places

Sims Smith Covered Bridge
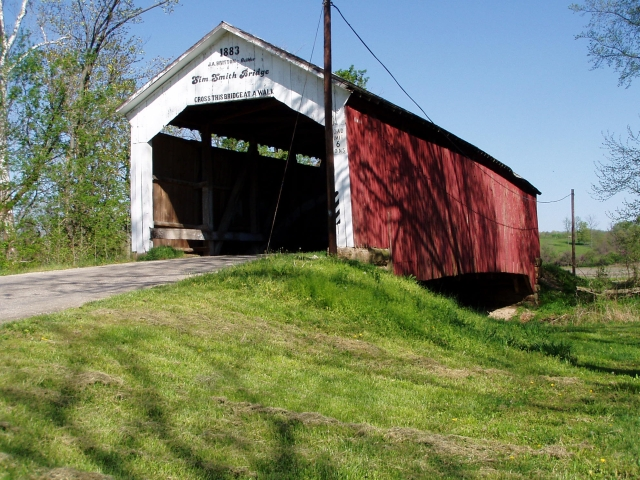
- North Portal
- Coordinates: 39°46′24.75″N 87°19′52.20″W
- Carries: C.R. W40N
- Crosses: Leatherwood Creek, Indiana
- Locale: Parke County, Indiana, United States
- Official name: Sims Smith Covered Bridge
- Named for: Simeon Smith
- Maintained by: Parke County
- NBI Number: 6100060

Characteristics
- Design: National Register of Historic Places
- Total length: 102 ft (31 m)84ft +9ft overhangs on each end
- Width: 16 ft (4.9 m)
- Height: 14 ft (4.3 m)

History
- Constructed by: Britton, J.A.
- Built: 1883
- Rebuilt: 1977
- Sim Smith Covered Bridge
- U.S. National Register of Historic Places
- MPS: Parke County Covered Bridges TR
- NRHP reference No.: 78000411
- Added to NRHP: Dec 22, 1978

Location
- Interactive map of Sims Smith Covered Bridge

The Sim Smith Covered Bridge is east of Montezuma, Indiana. The single span Burr Truss covered bridge structure was built by Joseph A. Britton in 1883. The bridge is 101 feet (31 m) long, 16 feet (4.9 m) wide, and 14 feet (4.3 m) high.

It was added to the National Register of Historic Places in 1978.

== Gallery ==
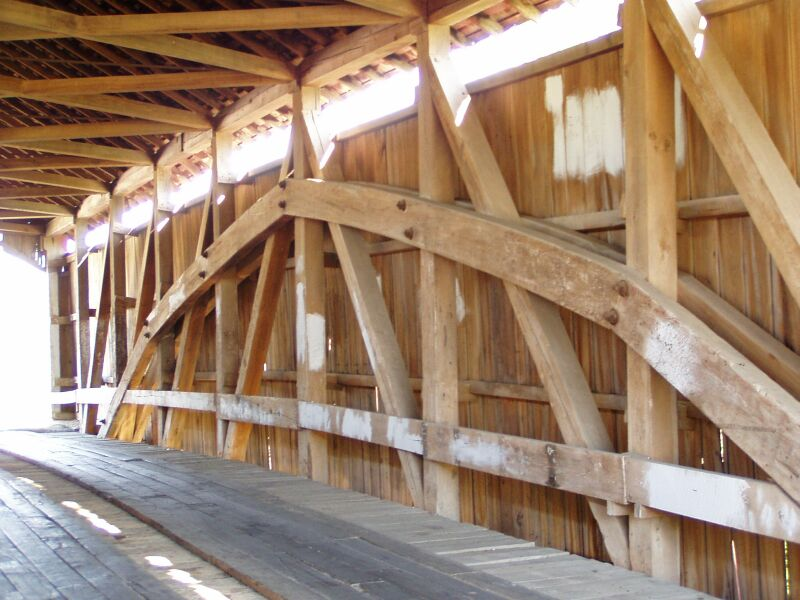
Detail of Burr Arch and King Posts

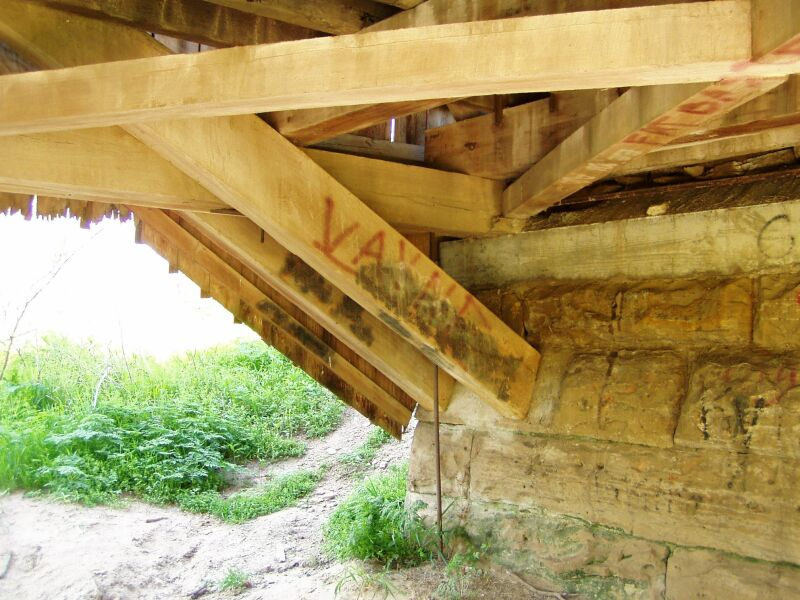
Detail of Abutment

== See also ==
- List of Registered Historic Places in Indiana
- Parke County Covered Bridges
- Parke County Covered Bridge Festival
