= Pulaski County Bridge No. 31 =

- Pulaski County Bridge No.31
- Formerly listed on the U.S. National Register of Historic Places
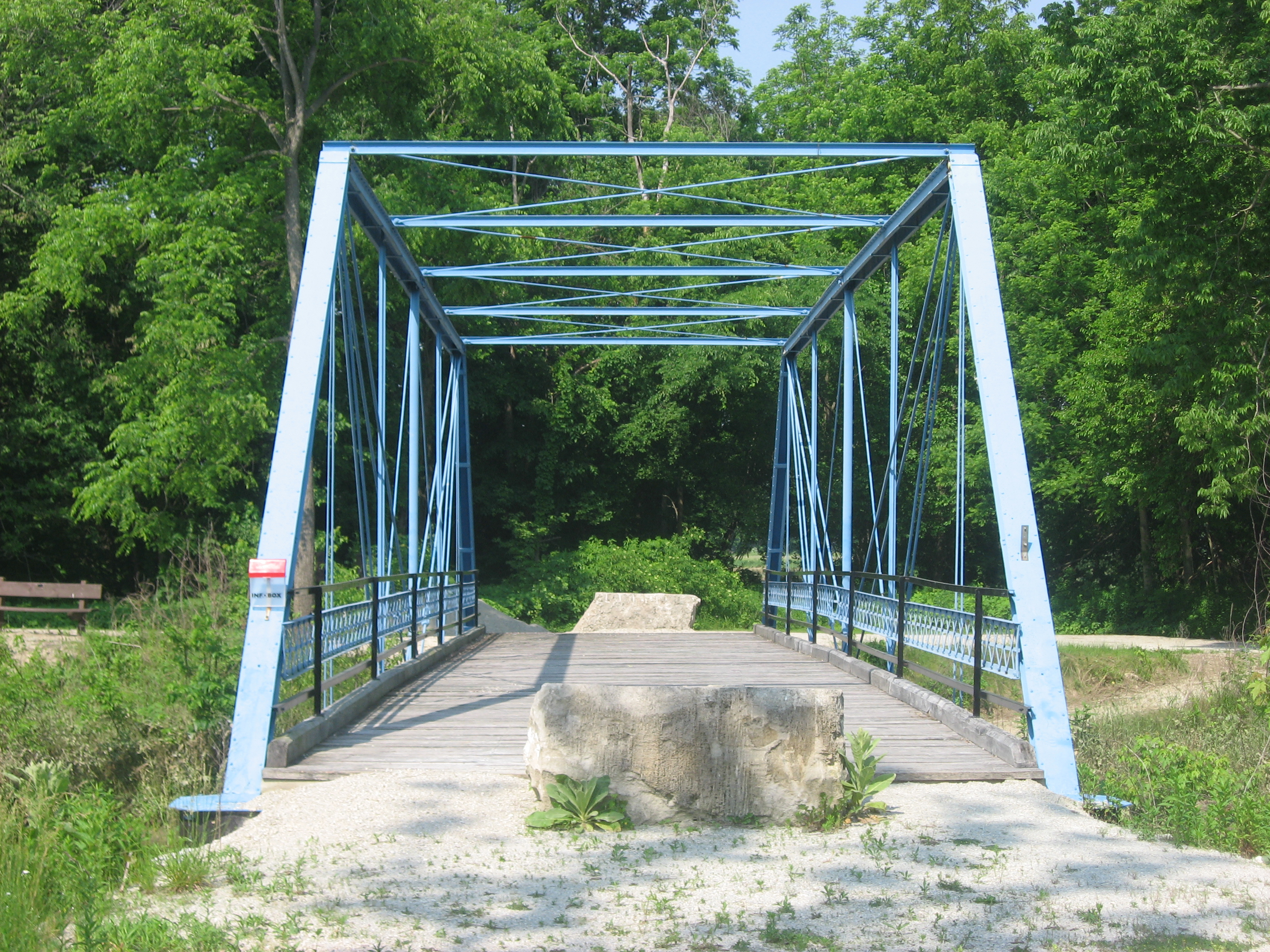
- Eastern end of the bridge

- Location within Carroll County, Indiana Location within Indiana Location within the United States
- Nearest city: Medaryville, Indiana
- Coordinates: 40°34′59″N 86°41′0″W
- Built: 1905
- Architect: Winamac Bridge Co.
- Architectural style: Stearns Truss
- NRHP reference No.: 03000546

Significant dates
- Added to NRHP: June 22, 2003
- Removed from NRHP: October 1, 2014

Pulaski County Bridge No. 31 (also known as the Stearns Truss Bridge or the Blue Bridge) is a Stearns truss bridge originally built in 1905 in Pulaski County in the U.S. state of Indiana. In 2006, it was disassembled at its location over Big Monon Ditch, near Medaryville in Pulaski County, and moved to the Wabash and Erie Canal park in Delphi in Carroll County, Indiana. It was added to the National Register of Historic Places (NRHP) in 2003, thanks to the efforts of a local Boy Scout. It is believed to be the last surviving Stearns Truss Bridge in the United States.

== History ==
The bridge was erected over the Big Monon Ditch in 1905 by the Winamac Bridge Company. It was designed by William E. Stearns, and is the only Stearns Truss Bridge known left in existence in the United States. A unique feature of the bridge is that it was designed to be easily moved. Various connecting points were made to easily pivot into and out of place, and the caissons were made to be loaded and unloaded with ballast to anchor the structure in place. This allowed the bridge to carry a much greater load as a function of its weight.

It was placed on the National Register as part of an Eagle Scout project by Bradley Nielsen, who began the effort in 2002. The bridge and the road it served sat on farm property owned by his grandparents, and had been abandoned for some time. With the assistance of the Pulaski County Historical society, Nielsen researched the bridge's history and construction, and filled out the application to place the structure on the NRHP. In 2003 the bridge was placed on the Register as "Pulaski County Bridge No. 31".

The bridge was owned by the county, and in 2005 when the contracts were let to clean the Big Monon Ditch the bridge was in the way of the dredging equipment. The commissioners discussed demolishing the bridge, and it was decided that removal of the bridge was necessary.

A group of concerned historians involved with the Wabash and Erie Canal Park in Delphi came to the bridge's rescue. In December, 2005, the Pulaski County commissioners sold the bridge for $10 to the Delphi group. They moved the bridge to Delphi, and over the past several years—with assistance from various funding agencies—have rebuilt the structure. It was dedicated on November 11, 2007, as a featured element of the interpretive park, known as the "Blue Bridge". It was subsequently removed from the National Register in 2014.
