= Spencerville Covered Bridge =

- U.S. National Register of Historic Places
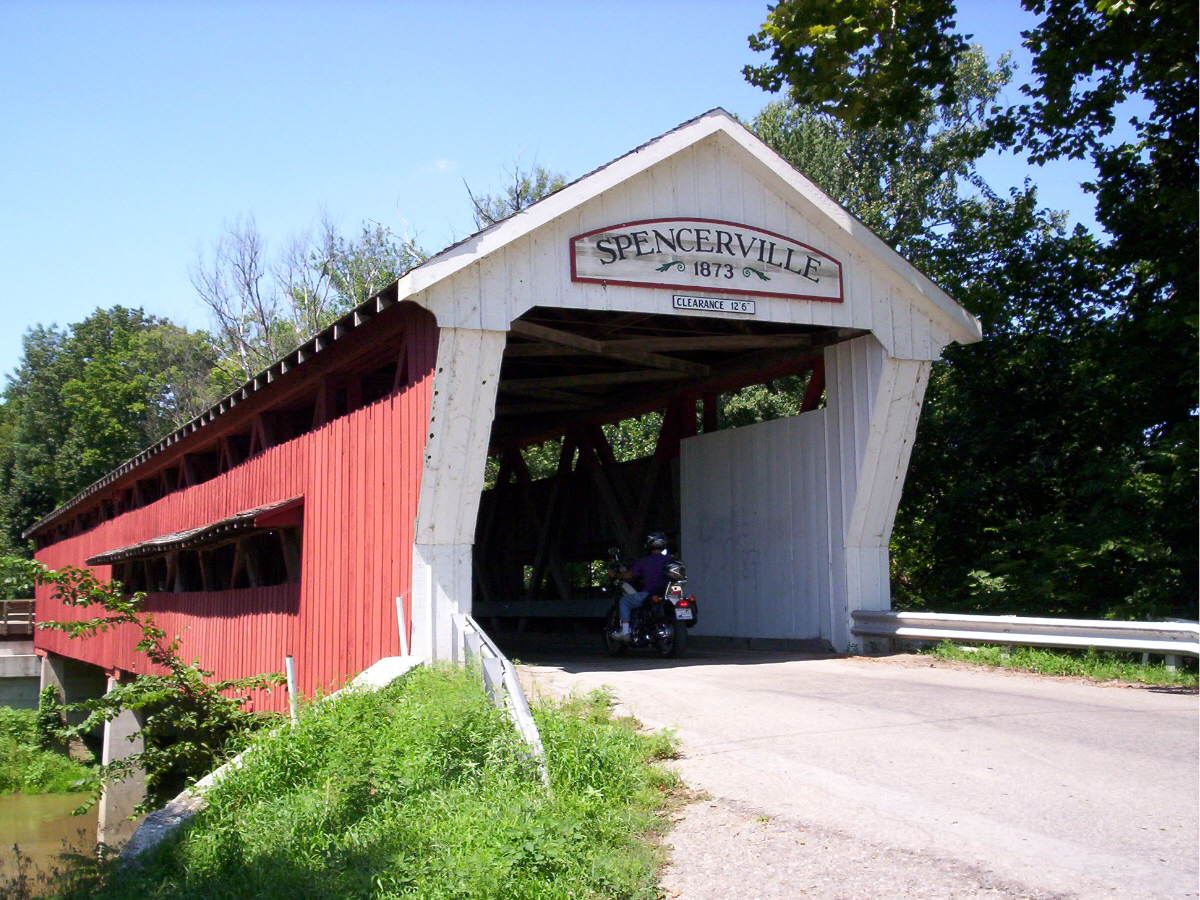
- Spencerville Covered Bridge, August 2007

- Location within Indiana Location within the United States
- Location: CR 68, at Spencerville, Indiana
- Coordinates: 41°16′53″N 84°54′51″W
- Area: less than one acre
- Built: 1873
- Built by: Mckay, John
- Architectural style: Smith Type 4 Truss
- NRHP reference No.: 81000010
- Added to NRHP: April 2, 1981

Spencerville Covered Bridge is a historic covered bridge located at Spencerville, Indiana. It was built in 1873, and spans the St. Joseph River. It is a Smith Type 4 truss bridge on concrete piers. It measures 146 feet long and topped by a gable roof and sided with board-and-batten siding. It is one of only six remaining Smith trusses in Indiana.

It was added to the National Register of Historic Places in 1981.

The Spencerville Covered Bridge was identified as a top priority among the thousands of rural bridges in the United States worthy of repair in President Biden's “American Jobs Plan” proposed on March 31, 2021. The Bill must first be approved by The US Congress, including votes by Indiana's 3rd Congressional District Representative Jim Banks and US Senators Todd Young and Mike Braun.
