= Wheeling, Gibson County, Indiana =

Wheeling (Kirkville)
- Unincorporated community
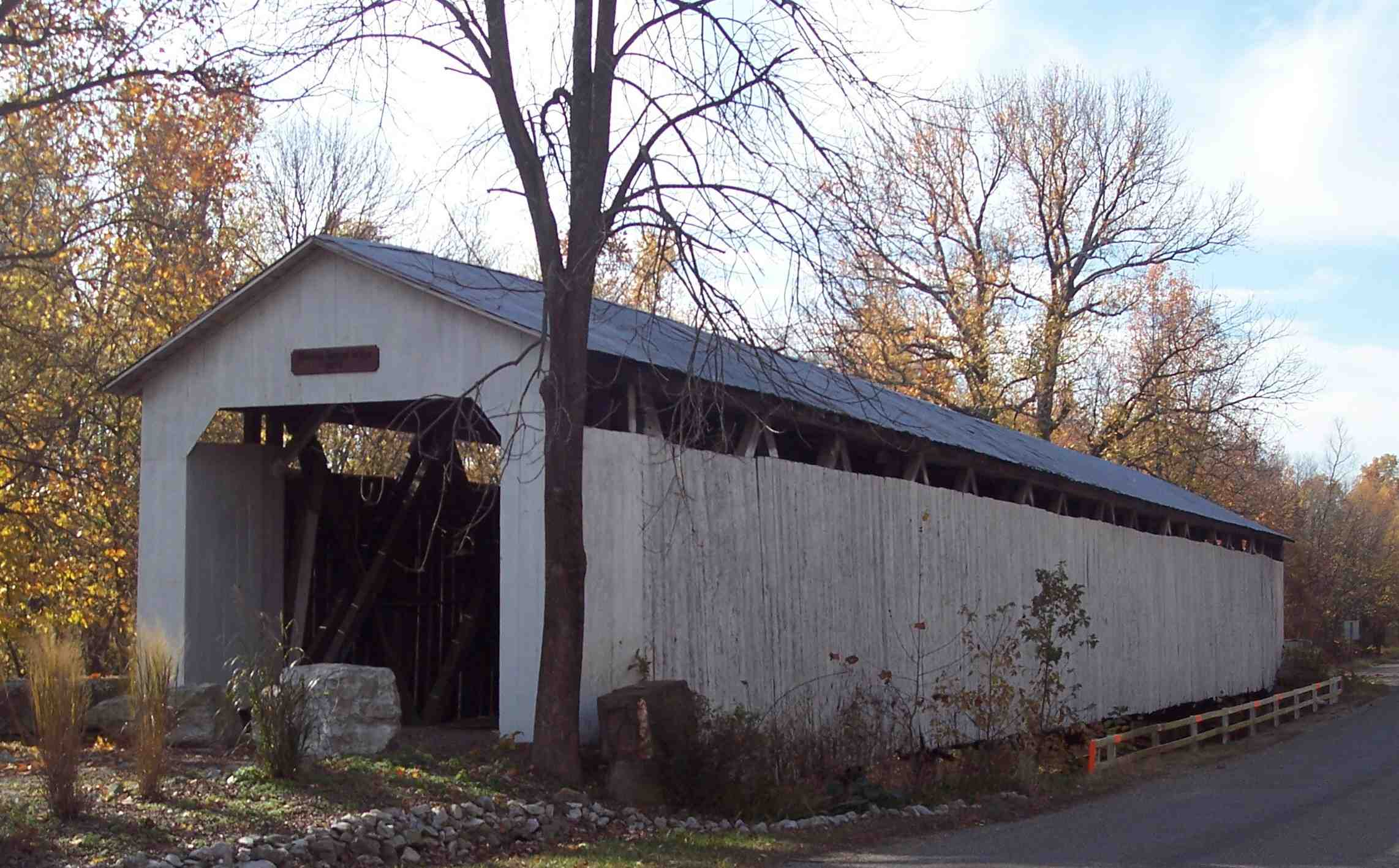
- Wheeling Bridge

- Location within Indiana Location within the United States
- Coordinates: 38°24′47″N 87°27′19″W
- Country: United States
- State: Indiana
- County: Gibson
- Township: Washington
- Elevation: 461 ft (141 m)
- ZIP code: 47649
- Area code: 812

Wheeling is an unincorporated community in Washington Township, Gibson County, Indiana, United States. The community contains a historic covered bridge over the Patoka River, the Wheeling Bridge, completed in 1877.

== History ==
Wheeling was originally named Kirksville, and under the latter name was platted in 1856. It was once a thriving agricultural community on the banks of the Patoka River until the railroad bypassed the community and it lost business to nearby towns.

The village of Wheeling was platted July 4, 1856. It was first called Kirksville, sometimes spelled Kirkville. It may have been named for Robert Kirk, an early judge. The community was also locally known as Bovine. A post office called Bovine was established on April 4, 1854, but closed on July 14, 1902.
