= Cataract Falls Covered Bridge =

Historic bridge in Indiana, US

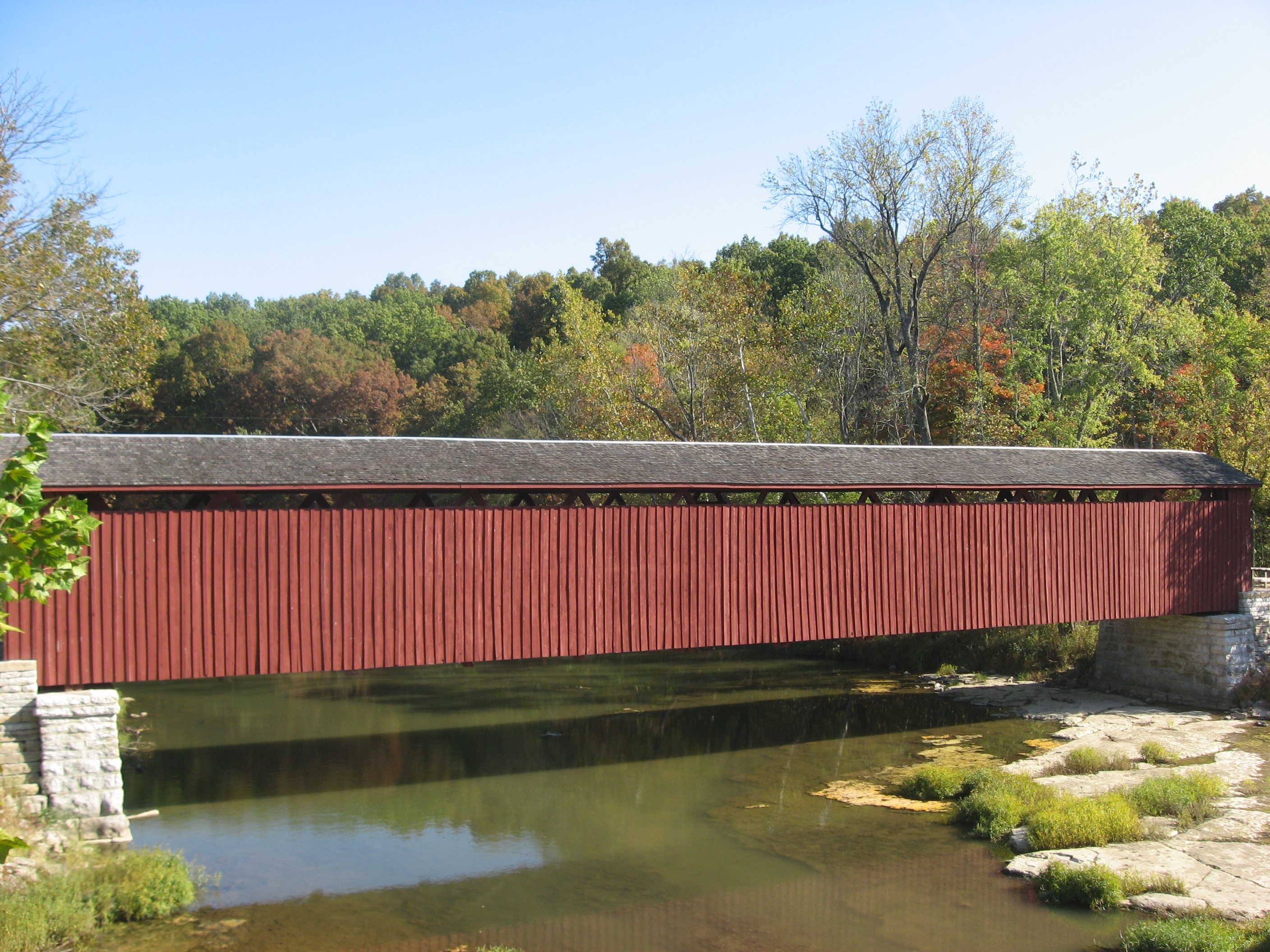
- Coordinates: 39°26′00″N 86°48′47″W
- Crosses: Mill Creek (formerly known as Eel River)
- Locale: Owen County, Indiana, United States
- NBI Number: INNBI 6000029

Characteristics
- Design: U.S. National Register of Historic Places
- Total length: 140.1 ft (42.7 m)(total length)
- Width: 13.5 m (44 ft)
- Height: 12.5 ft (3.8 m)

History
- Constructed by: Smith Bridge Co.
- Built: 1876
- Cataract Falls Covered Bridge
- U.S. National Register of Historic Places
- NRHP reference No.: 05000339
- Added to NRHP: 2005

Location
- Interactive map of Cataract Falls Covered Bridge

The Cataract Falls Covered Bridge is a covered bridge that spans Mill Creek in Lieber State Recreation Area, Owen County, Indiana, United States. Built in 1876 by the Smith Bridge company of Toledo, Ohio, it was at one time one of the most famous and photographed covered bridges in the United States. It is the only remaining one in Owen County.

Since the road bypassed the bridge in 1988, it is only open to pedestrians. It was added to the National Register of Historic Places in 2005.

== See also ==
- Cataract Falls (Indiana)
- List of bridges documented by the Historic American Engineering Record in Indiana
