= Starke County Bridge No. 39 =

- U.S. National Register of Historic Places
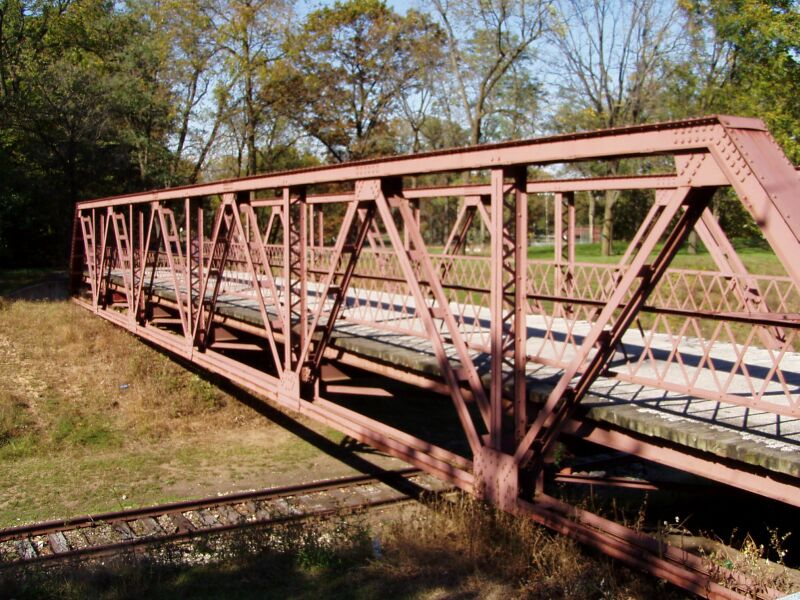

- Location within Indiana Location within the United States
- Location: Jct. of Main and Water Sts., across the former Pennsylvania RR cut, Knox, Indiana
- Coordinates: 41°18′1″N 86°37′25″W
- Area: less than one acre
- Built: 1915
- Built by: Rochester Bridge Company
- Architectural style: Warren Pony Truss
- NRHP reference No.: 93001413
- Added to NRHP: December 10, 1993

Starke County Bridge No. 39 is a single span Warren Pony Truss structure. The bridge is located on the northern outskirts of the small town of Knox, Indiana, where Main and Water Streets terminate at the former Penn Central Railroad cut. The bridge spans the rail cut in a northwest–southeast direction, allowing access to Wythougan Park.

When built in 1915, it was east of Knox, on County Road 1100 East, over the Yellow River. It was moved in 1992. At its original site, metal caisson abutments and concrete wingwalls supported the bridge. When it was relocated, concrete abutments were created. The steel bridge is 103 feet (31 m) long and has a 13.56 feet (4.13 m) roadway.

== Design ==
The bridge consists of six Warren Truss panels on each side. All the interior verticals are paired laced angles, diagonals were made from pairs of angles. The heaviest are located in the outer panels. Verticals and diagonal members have riveted stay plates. Upper and lower chords are composed of I beams. Where upper or lower chords meet the verticals and diagonals, joins are gussets, which are bolted to all members. The roadbed is created by heavy wooden decking with an overlay of asphalt. The original guardrail remains. On the south end of the span, fixed onto the face of the right endpost, is a plague which reads "Starke County Commissioners, Peter Mosher, Fred Kingman, Lee Wolfe, Auditor, C.W. Weninger, engineer, Chas. A. Good. Built by the Rochester Bridge Co. Rochester Ind. 1915".

In 1992, the Indiana Department of Transportation (INDOT) declared the bridge unsafe for present traffic needs. A Memorandum of Agreement with the Indiana Division of Historic Preservation and Archaeology, INDOT offered the bridge to local preservation groups. The group would have to move the structure site and rehabilitate it. The Starke County Historical Society acquired the bridge and hired Dillbaugh, Inc. of Crown Point, Indiana to move the structure to its present site which was accomplished in May 1992.

== Significance ==
Bridge No. 39 employs the Warren Pony Truss, a common truss type in the early 20th century. The Warren Truss is one of several variants on the basic kingpost structural system. It was patented in England by James Warren and Willoughby Monzani in 1848 and by Squire Whipple (inventor of the Whipple Truss) in 1849. The Warren consists of a series of kingposts set within parallel upper and lower chords. Because of the high stress where panel met, pins joints received undue wear which could cause failure. Once bolted gusset plates and riveting technology replaced the pinning technique, Warren Trusses came into regular use. By the early 1900s, the Warren was commonly used for highway and railroad bridges. By the 1920s, other metal truss types replace the Warren truss.

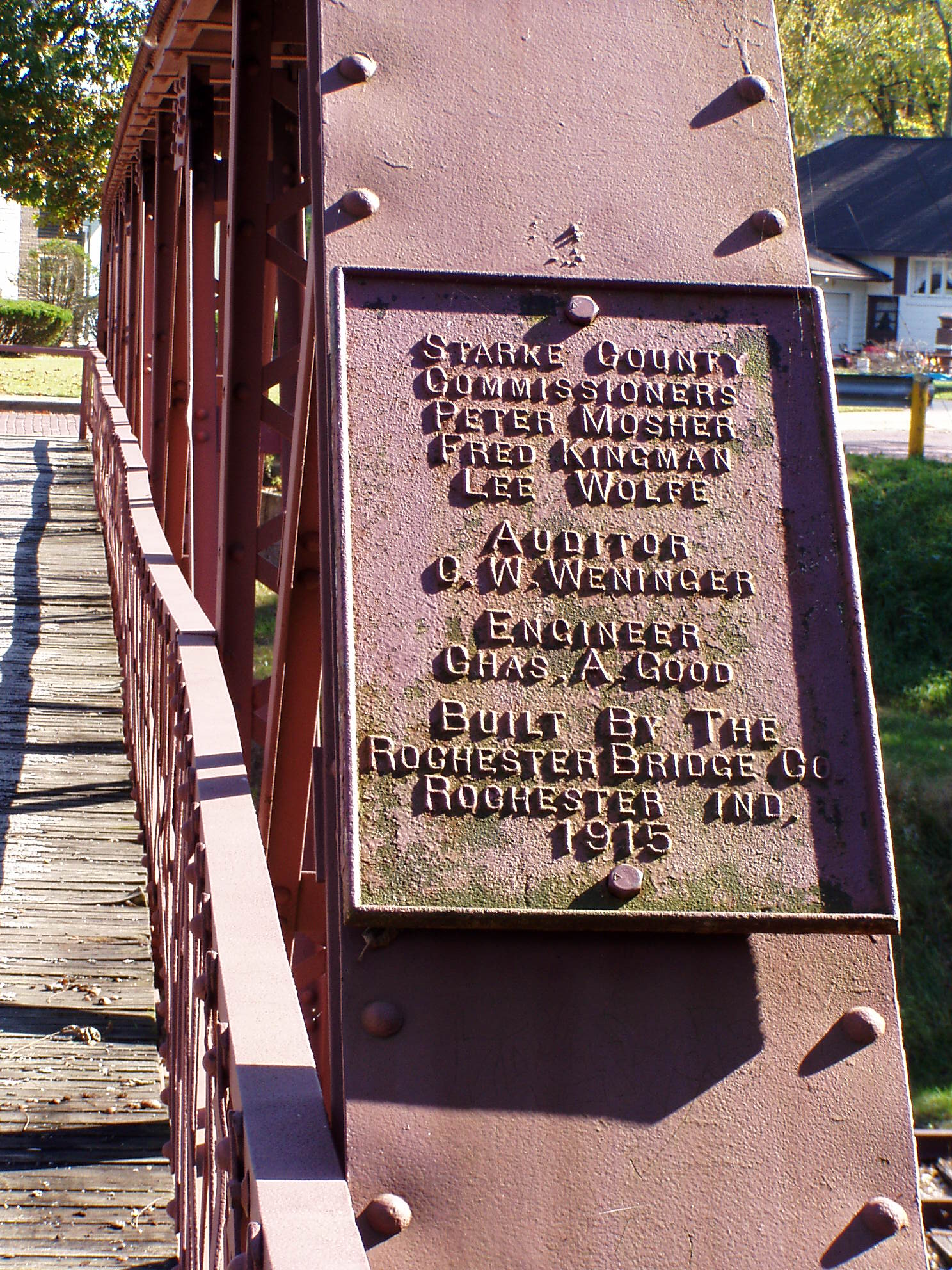
Dedication Plaque. Bridge No. 39, Starke County, Knox, Indiana

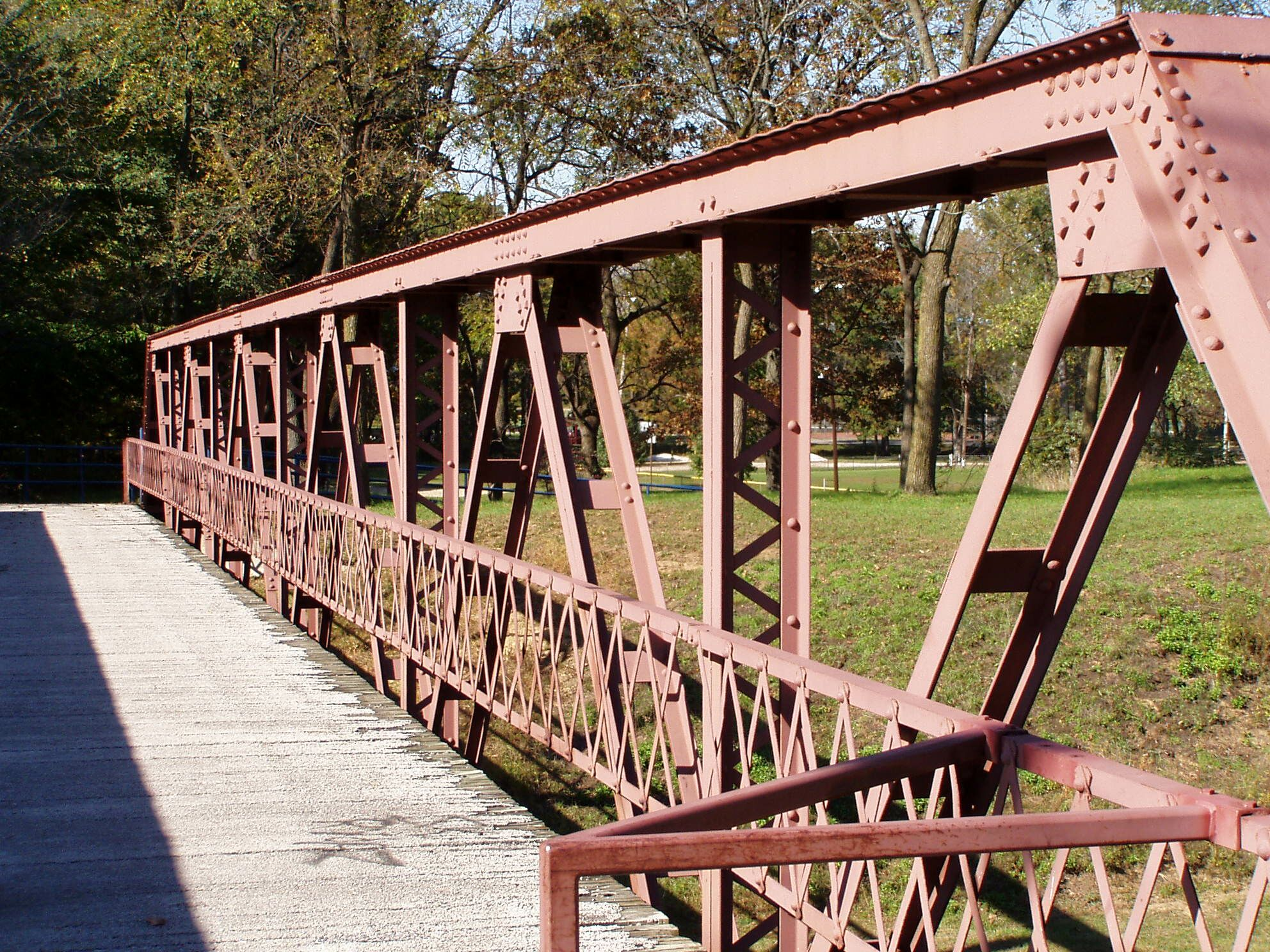
Warren Truss. Bridge No. 39, Starke County, Knox, Indiana

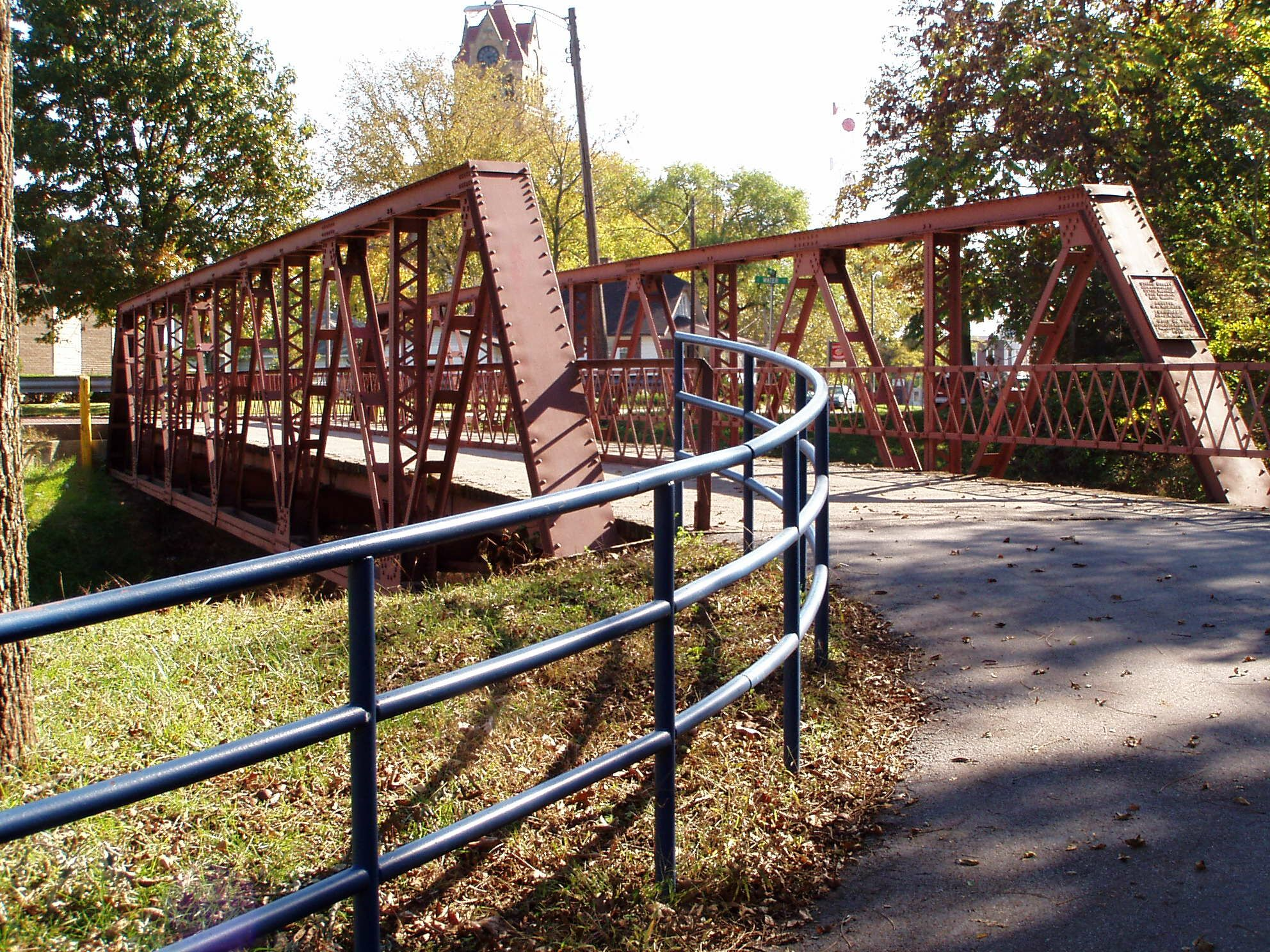
Approach from the north side. Bridge No. 39, Starke County, Knox, Indiana

== Bibliography ==
- Comp, T. Allan and Donald C. Jackson. "Bridge Truss Types: A Guide to Dating and Identifying," American Association of State and Local History Technical Leaflet 95, Nashville, TN, 1977.
- Condit, Carl. American Building. Chicago: University of Chicago Press, 196ST
- Cooper, James L. Iron Monuments to Distant Posterity; Indiana's Metal Bridges, 1870–1930. Indianapolis: Indiana Division of Historic Preservation and Archaeology, 1987.
- Groppe, Maureen. "Old Knox Bridge to Get New Use," South Bend Tribune, May 10, 1992, section C, p. 1.
- Indiana Division of Historic Preservation and Archaeology, Indiana Historic Bridge Inventory.
