= Bell Ford Bridge =

- Bell Ford Post Patented Diagonal "Combination Bridge"
- U.S. National Register of Historic Places
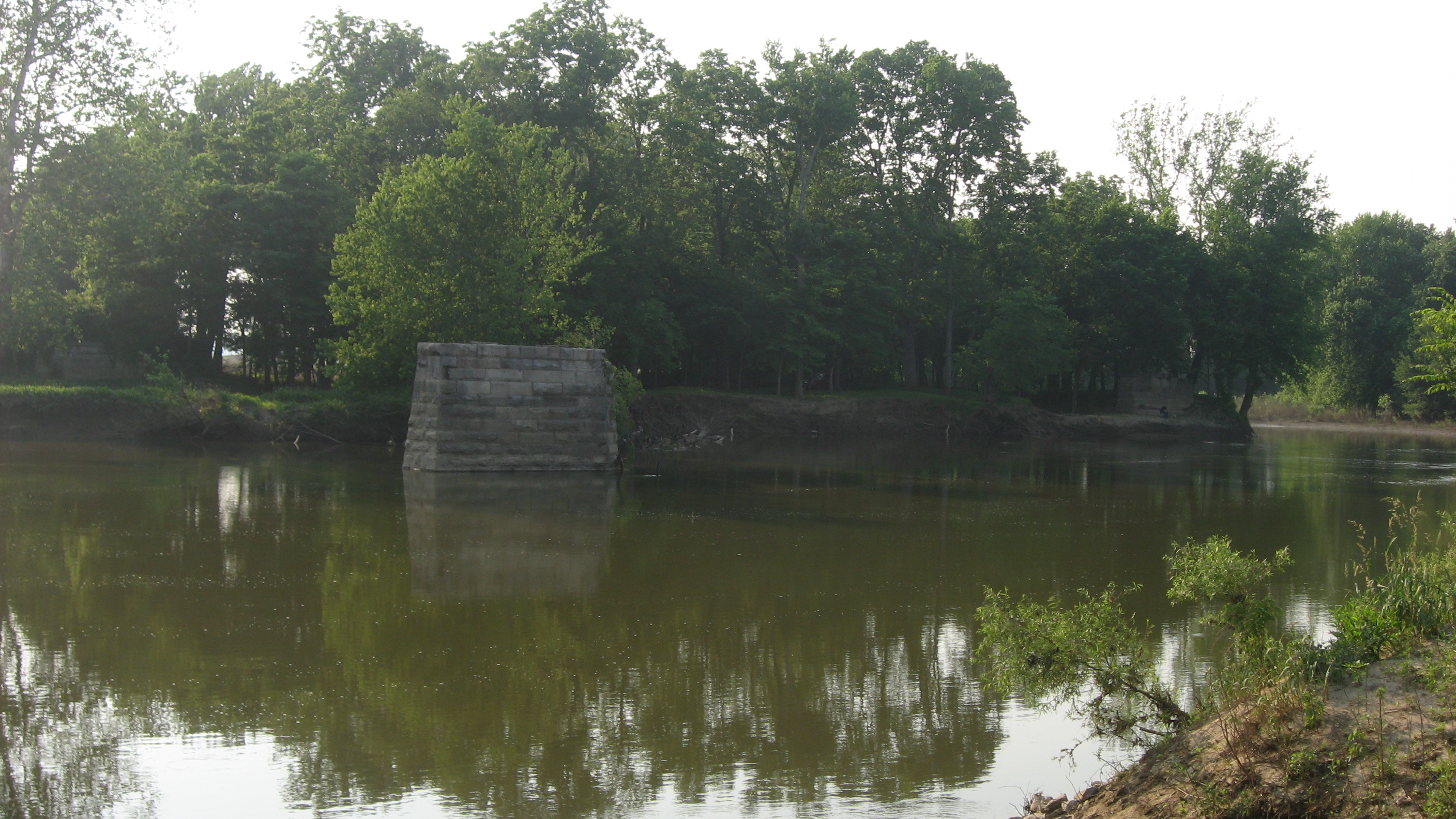
- Piers at the site of the former bridge

- Location within Indiana Location within the United States
- Location: Seymour, Indiana
- Coordinates: 38°58′25″N 85°55′47″W
- Area: less than one acre
- Built: 1868, c. 1885
- Built by: Blish, John; Pattison, Robert, et al.
- Architectural style: Combination Truss
- NRHP reference No.: 05000194
- Added to NRHP: March 25, 2005

The Bell Ford Post Patented Diagonal "Combination Bridge", often simply called the Bell Ford Bridge or Bell Ford Covered Bridge, is a dilapidated covered bridge located in Jackson County, Indiana, northwest of Seymour, Indiana. The bridge originally passed over the East Fork of the White River on a former alignment of State Road 258, and was placed on the National Register of Historic Places on March 25, 2005.

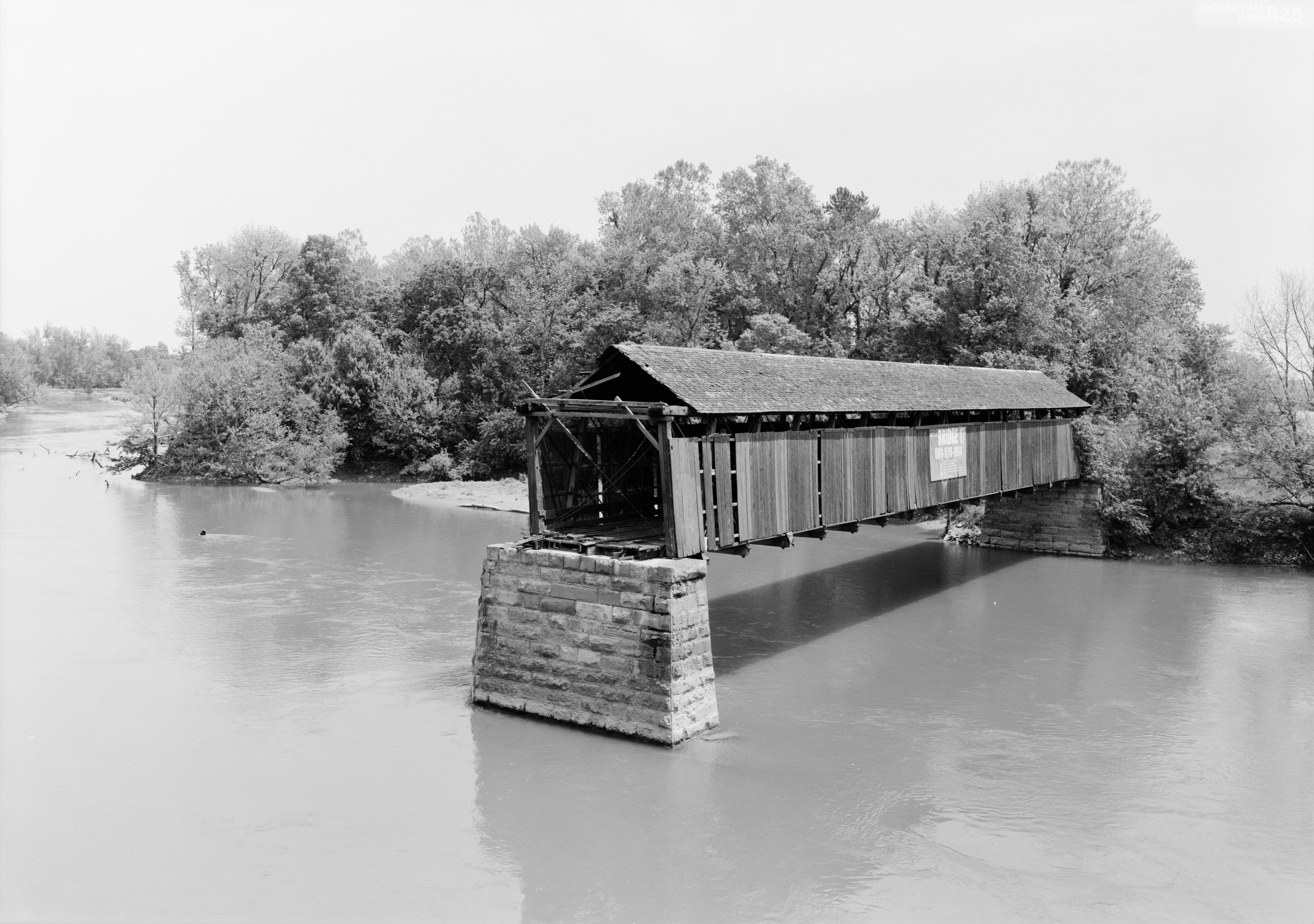
2004 view (eastern span)

The bridge was originally built in 1869. Built in two sections, the wood and iron bridge measured 325 feet long. It reflects a time when the construction of bridges began switching from wood to iron / steel, every tensile web in the trusses made of iron, every compression member made from wood. The now unusual use of both materials has made it said that the Bell Ford Bridge is "the best representation of the American engineering “combination” bridge form". Until 1970 it was regularly used by both cars and animals. The western span collapsed in February 1999 during a windstorm, and the eastern span collapsed on January 2, 2006, nine months after it made the National Register. Its collapse meant that no combination variant Post Truss remained standing worldwide.

After the Bell Ford Bridge's January 2006 collapse, Jackson County Commission President Gary Darlage said: "There is nothing left of the Bell Ford Bridge and I will not spend another tax dollar on it. Ninety percent of the people in this county think it is asinine to even consider rebuilding that bridge. On July 25, 2007, United States Representative Baron Hill announced that the National Historic Covered Bridge Preservation Program would be giving the Bell Ford Bridge and two other covered bridges in Jackson County $2.08 million total for restoration. $448,000 of the grant was for the Bell Ford Bridge.

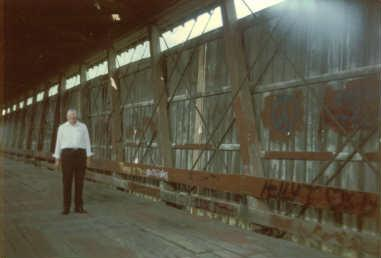
The Bell Ford Bridge's Post Truss

On August 19, 2008, the commissioners of Jackson County voted 3–0 to sell what remained of the bridge to an interest group who intended to rebuild the bridge at Fort Benjamin Harrison State Park in Indianapolis, Indiana, over sixty miles (97 km) away from its current location. It would allow walkers and bikers to cross over Fall Creek. The restoration is expected to take two years and cost $2 million (USD), with a hope that federal grants will be available. It has been promised that historical markers will denote its history in Jackson County, but some preservationists in Jackson County decry it being moved, saying the grant money was already there to pay for its renovation in Jackson County. One thing that might stop the bridge from being moved is if Jackson County would have to repay $123,000 of federal money for design and restoration work it received to use on the bridge since 1999. In late May 2010 an Indiana Department of Transportation representative requested of Jackson County commissioners that a decision be made in the coming month.

== See also ==
- List of bridges documented by the Historic American Engineering Record in Indiana
