= Snow Hill Covered Bridge =

- U.S. National Register of Historic Places
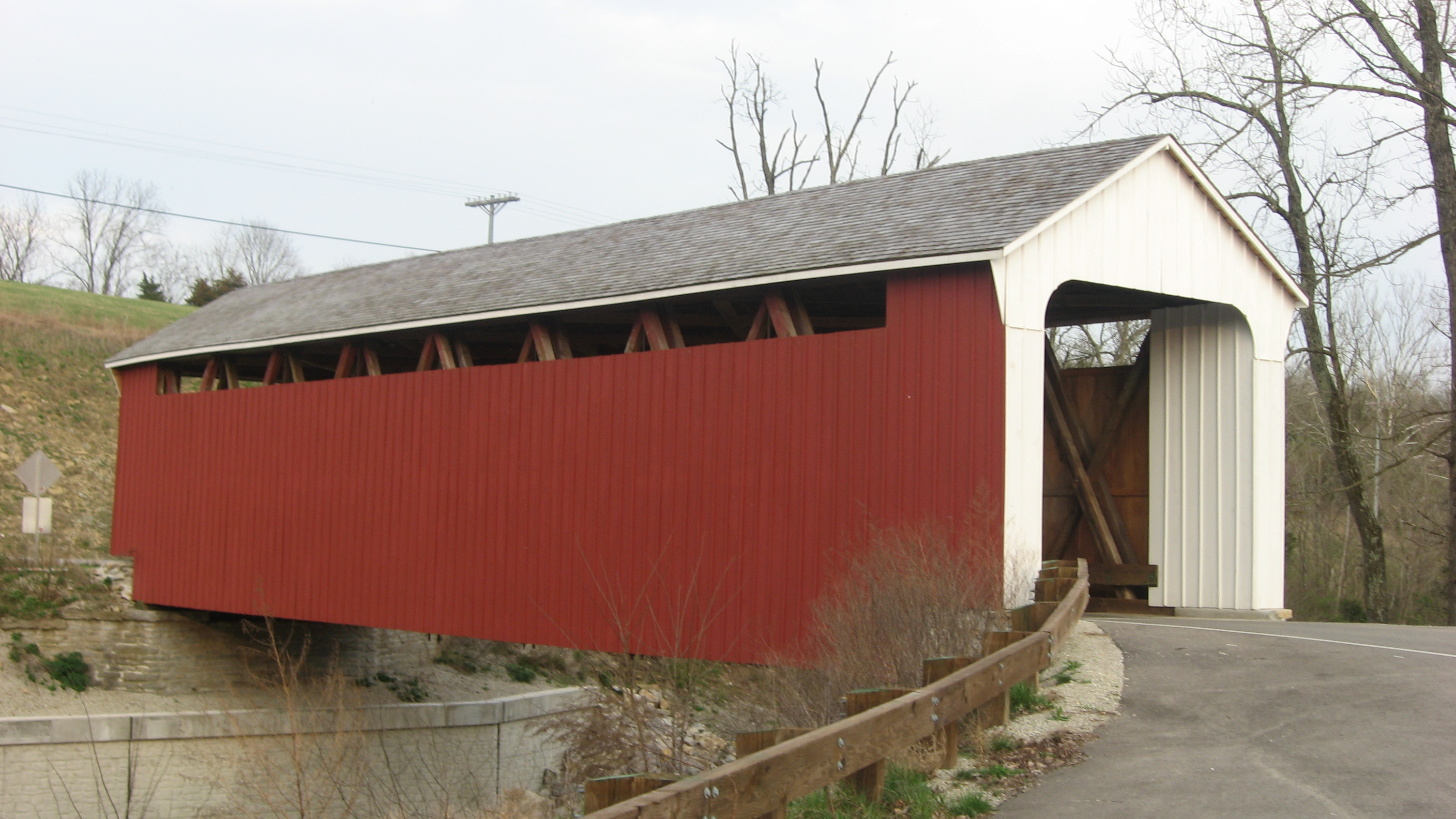
- Snow Hill Covered Bridge, March 2012

- Location within Indiana Location within the United States
- Location: Snow Hill Rd. over Johnson Fork, Whitewater Township, Franklin County, Indiana
- Coordinates: 39°19′32″N 84°51′6″W
- Area: less than one acre
- Built: 1895
- Built by: Butts, William; Horn, John
- Architectural style: Howe Truss
- NRHP reference No.: 95000208
- Added to NRHP: March 3, 1995

Snow Hill Covered Bridge, also known as Johnson Fork Covered Bridge, is a historic Howe Truss covered bridge located in Whitewater Township, Franklin County, Indiana. The bridge was built in 1895, and measures 75 feet long. It has a gable roof, is clad in board and natten siding, and has an open clerestory.

It was listed on the National Register of Historic Places in 1995.
