= Ceylon Covered Bridge =

- U.S. National Register of Historic Places
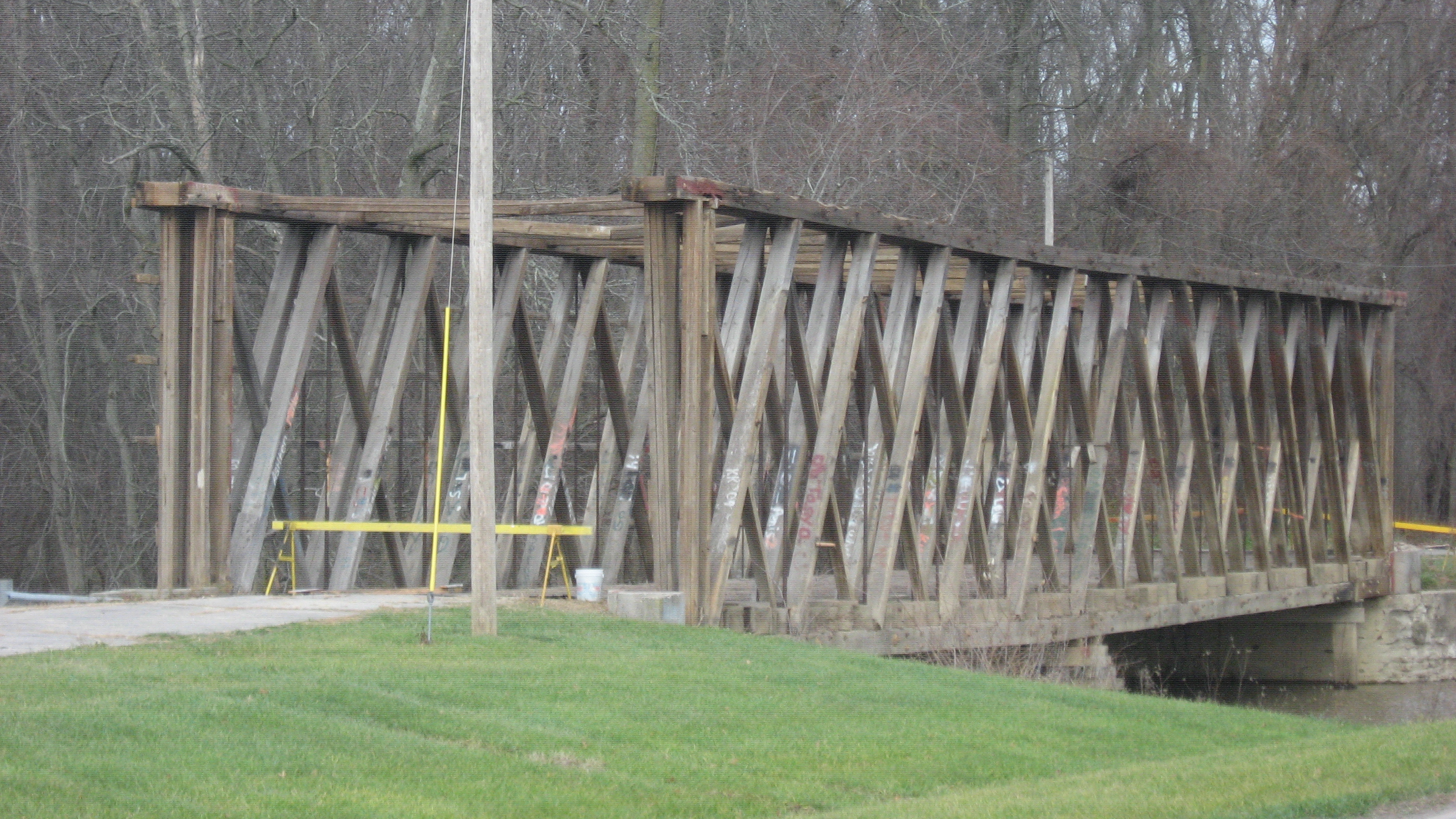
- Ceylon Covered Bridge, November 2011

- Location within Adams County, Indiana Location within Indiana Location within the United States
- Location: County Road 900S over the Wabash River in Limberlost County Park, northeast of Ceylon, Wabash Township, Adams County, Indiana
- Coordinates: 40°36′51″N 84°56′35″W
- Area: less than one acre
- Built: 1879
- Built by: Smith Bridge Company; Huffman, Martin J.
- Architectural style: Howe truss bridge
- NRHP reference No.: 06001289
- Added to NRHP: January 25, 2007

Ceylon Covered Bridge is a historic covered bridge over the Wabash River and located at Wabash Township, Adams County, Indiana. It was built in 1879 by the Smith Bridge Company of Toledo, Ohio, and is a 130-foot-long (40 m) truss bridge. It the only remaining covered bridge over the Wabash.

It was listed on the National Register of Historic Places in 2007.

== See also ==
- List of bridges documented by the Historic American Engineering Record in Indiana
