= Tangier, Indiana =

Unincorporated community in Indiana, United States

- Unincorporated community
- Parke County's location in Indiana

- Location in Parke County
- Coordinates: 39°55′09″N 87°19′05″W
- Country: United States
- State: Indiana
- County: Parke
- Township: Liberty
- Elevation: 627 ft (191 m)
- Time zone: UTC-5 (Eastern (EST))
  - Summer (DST): UTC-4 (EDT)
- ZIP code: 47952
- Area code: 765
- GNIS feature ID: 444565

Tangier (also called Long Siding or Woodys Corner) is an unincorporated community in Liberty Township, Parke County, in the U.S. state of Indiana.

== History ==
Tangier was platted in 1886. The community was named after Tangier, in Morocco. A post office was established at Tangier in 1886, and remained in operation until it was discontinued in 1994.
