= Wilkins Mill Covered Bridge =

Place in Indiana listed on National Register of Historic Places

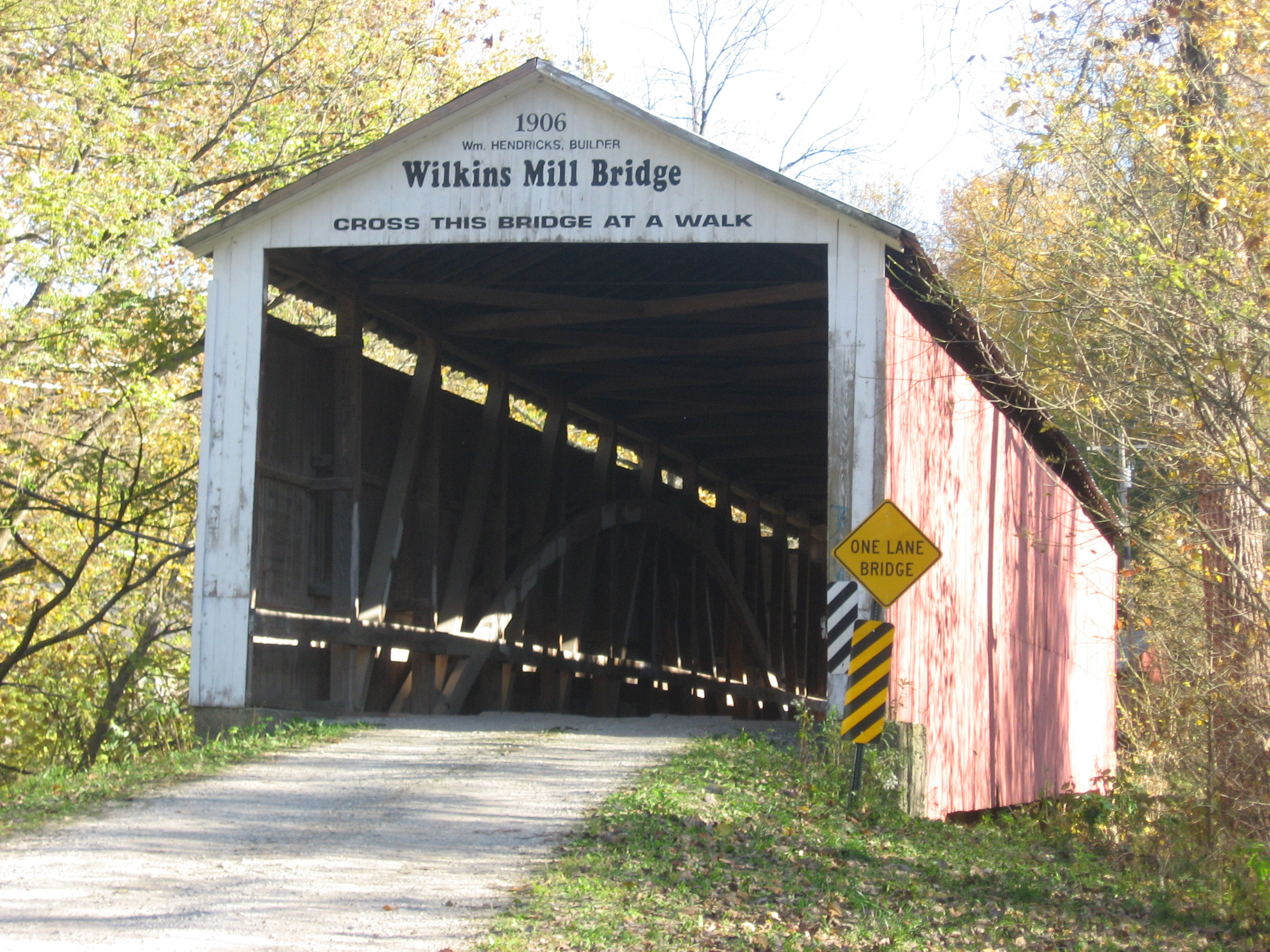
- Wilkins Mill Covered Bridge
- Coordinates: 39°53′54.09″N 87°13′59.37″W
- Carries: Cox Ford Road
- Crosses: Sugar Mill Creek
- Locale: Parke County, Indiana, United States
- Official name: Wilkins Mill Covered Bridge
- Named for: Wilkins Mill
- Maintained by: Parke County
- NBI Number: 6100172

Characteristics
- Design: National Register of Historic Places
- Total length: 120 ft (37 m)102ft +9ft overhangs on each end
- Width: 16 ft (4.9 m)
- Height: 13 ft (4.0 m)

History
- Constructed by: Hendricks, William
- Built: 1906
- Rebuilt: 1991 $6,000
- Wilkins Mill Covered Bridge
- U.S. National Register of Historic Places
- MPS: Parke County Covered Bridges TR
- NRHP reference No.: 78000415
- Added to NRHP: Dec 22, 1978

Location
- Interactive map of Wilkins Mill Covered Bridge

The Wilkins Mill Covered Bridge is north of Rockville, Indiana, United States. The single span Burr Arch Truss covered bridge structure was built by William Hendricks in 1906. The bridge is 120 feet (37 m) long, 16 feet (4.9 m) wide, and 13 feet (4.0 m) high.

It was added to the National Register of Historic Places in 1978.

== History ==
Solomon Jessup and Zimri Hunt built a mill in 1835 upstream from the bridge site. George Wilkins later opened a store there in 1853 and a carding mill, operated by Solomon Jessup and William Hunt was also built. In 1855 Wilkins bought the mill but later tore it down and built a new one. This is the source of the name Wilkins Mill, however, in 1877 this mill burned down and another mill was built which stood until 1947.

The 1874 Atlas of Parke County shows that the creek was named Mill Creek, but today it is labeled as Sugar Mill Creek. Sugar Mill Creek and Green Creek converge below the bridge and it would seem that after one flood the Sugar Mill Creek changed its course and left the bridge standing over a dry creek bed for a period of time. Looking at satellite picture now show that it appears the bridge is once again crossing water.

This was to be the second of three covered bridges built by William Hendricks.

== Gallery ==
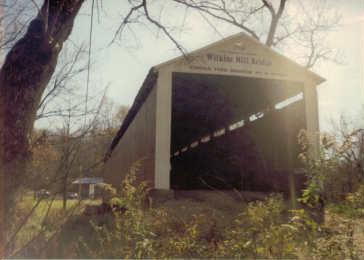

== See also ==
- List of Registered Historic Places in Indiana
- Parke County Covered Bridges
- Parke County Covered Bridge Festival
