= National Register of Historic Places listings in Indiana =

This is a list of properties and districts in Indiana that are listed on the National Register of Historic Places. There are over 2,000 in total. Of these, 44 are National Historic Landmarks. Each of Indiana's 92 counties has at least two listings.

The locations of National Register properties and districts (at least for all showing latitude and longitude coordinates below), may be seen in an online map by clicking on "Map of all coordinates".

This National Park Service list is complete through NPS recent listings posted October 23, 2026.

== Current listings by county ==
The following are approximate tallies of current listings by county. These counts are based on entries in the National Register Information Database as of March 13, 2009 and new weekly listings posted since then on the National Register of Historic Places web site. There are frequent additions to the listings and occasional delistings and the counts here are approximate and not official. New entries are added to the official Register on a weekly basis. Also, the counts in this table exclude boundary increase and decrease listings which modify the area covered by an existing property or district and which carry a separate National Register reference number.

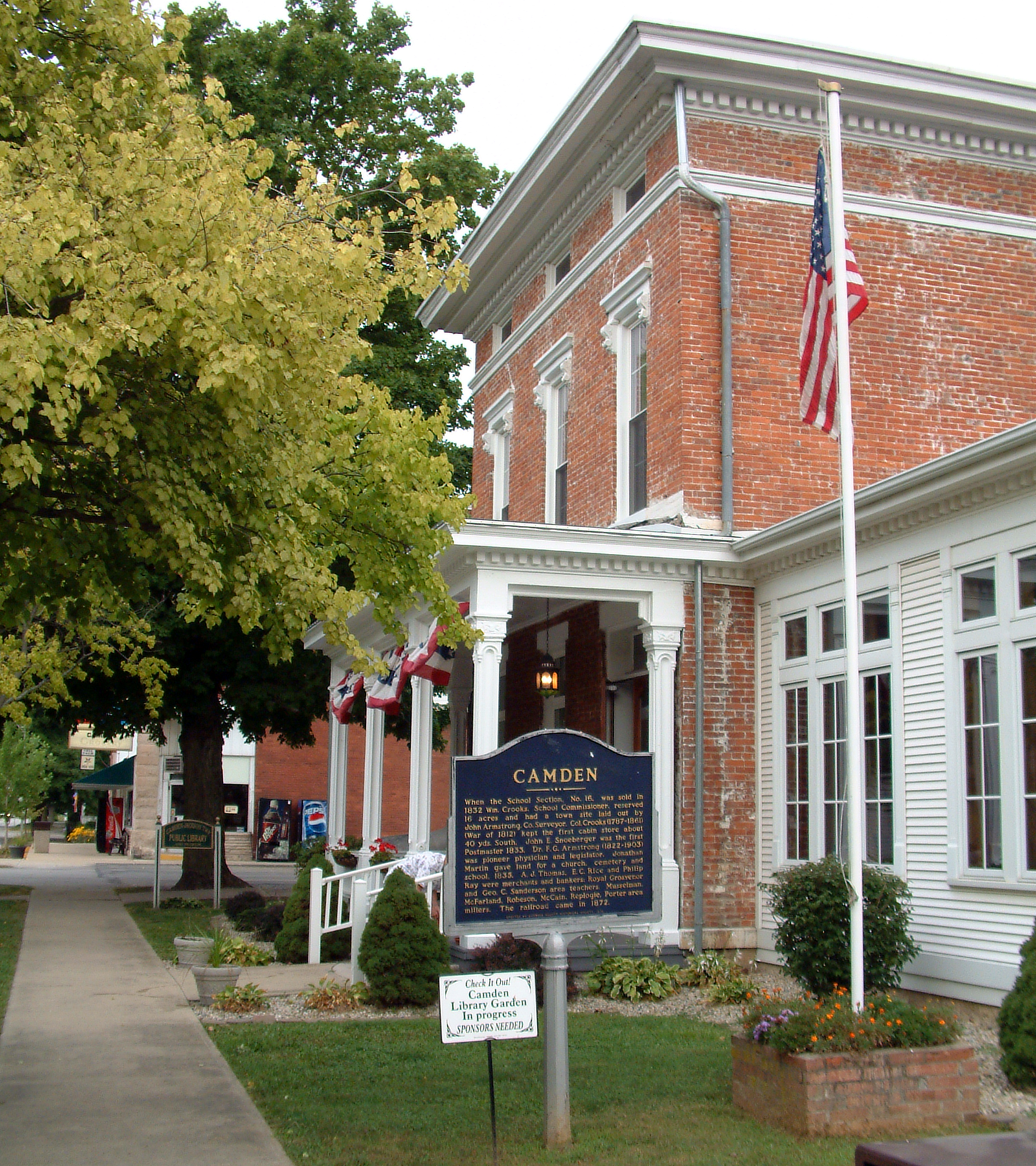
Andrew Thomas House, in Carroll County

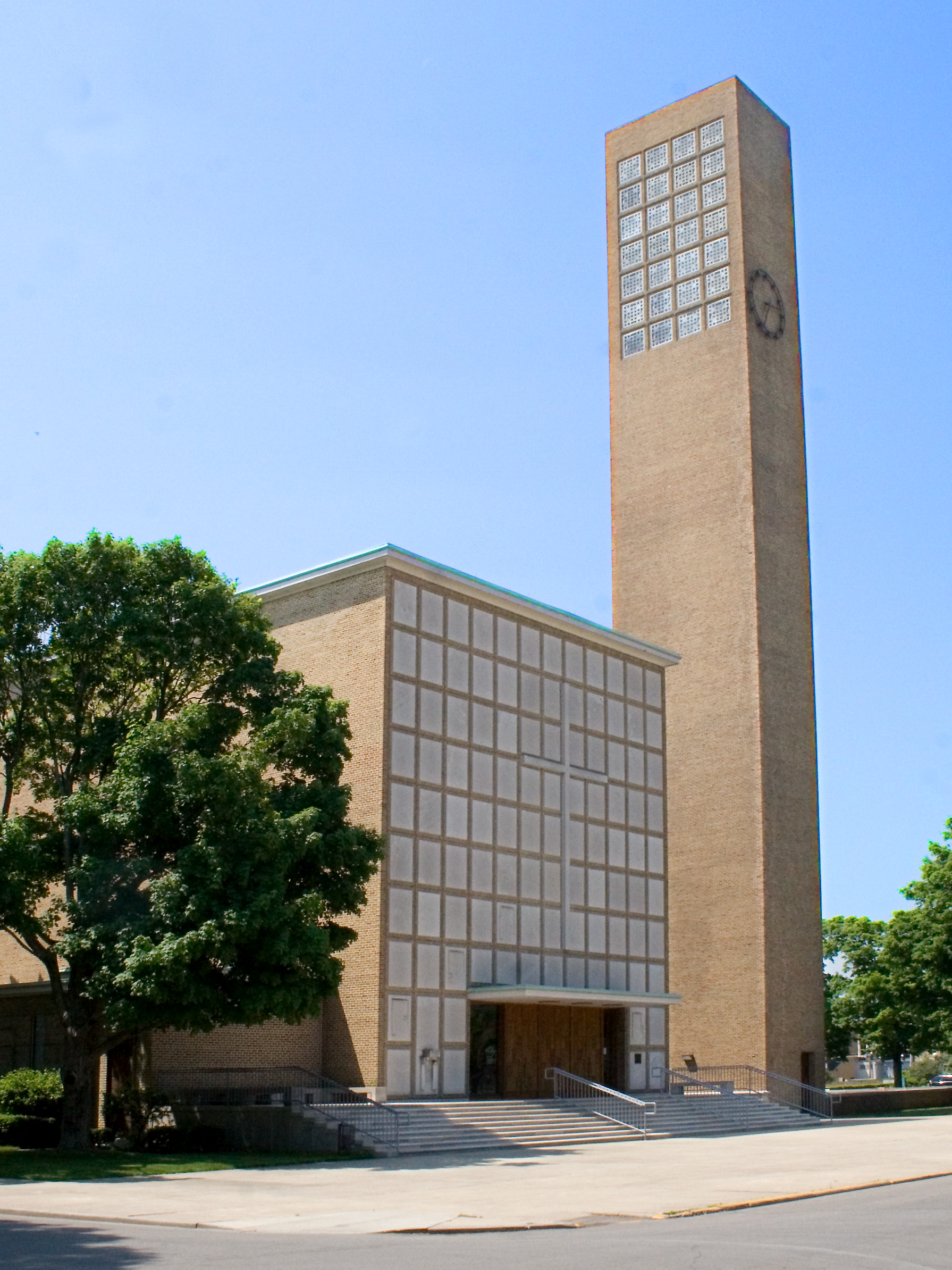
First Christian Church, designed by Eliel Saarinen, in Bartholomew County

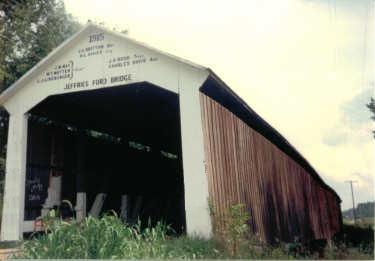
Jeffries Ford Covered Bridge, destroyed by fire in 2002 but still NRHP-listed, in Parke County

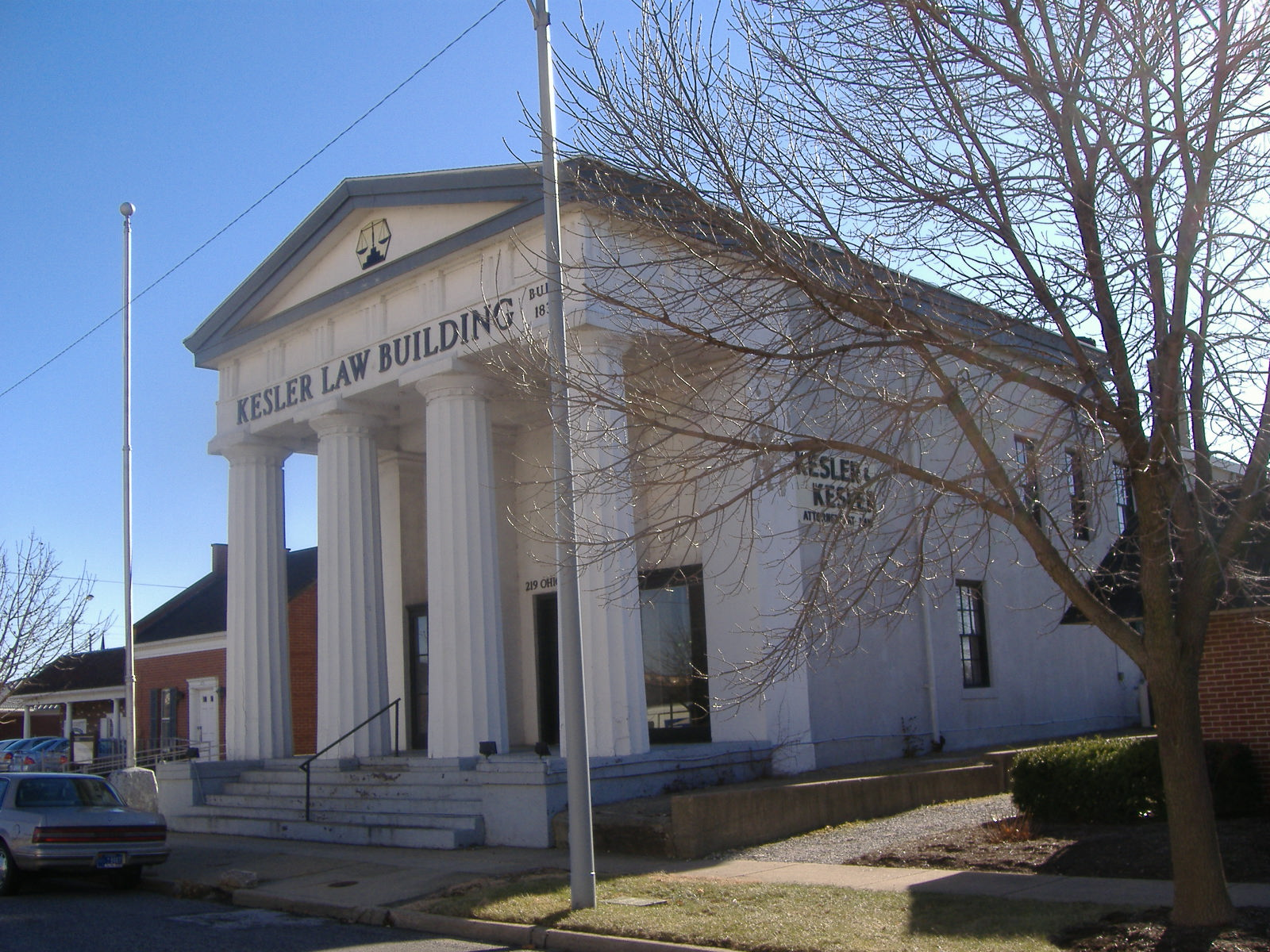
State Bank of Indiana, Branch of (Memorial Hall), in Vigo County

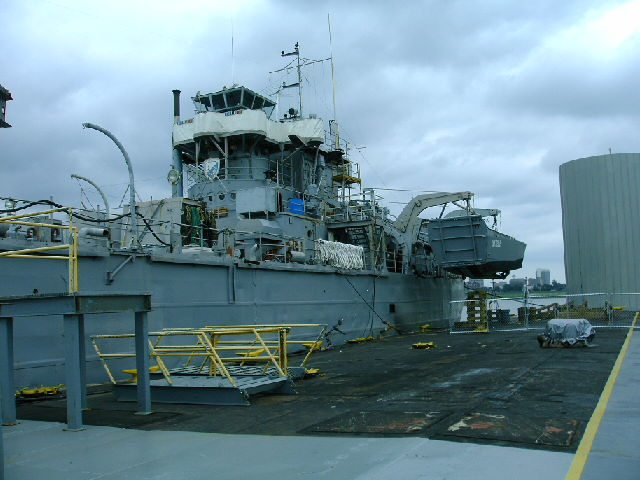
USS LST 325 (tank landing ship), Vanderburgh County

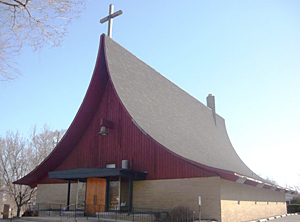
St. Augustine's Episcopal Church, designed by Edward D. Dart, in Lake County

	County	# of Sites
1	Adams	10
2	Allen	83
3	Bartholomew	25
4	Benton	7
5	Blackford	4
6	Boone	14
7	Brown	9
8	Carroll	41
9	Cass	16
10	Clark	26
11	Clay	14
12	Clinton	12
13	Crawford	2
14	Daviess	13
15	Dearborn	28
16	Decatur	10
17	DeKalb	29
18	Delaware	45
19	Dubois	19
20	Elkhart	39
21	Fayette	9
22	Floyd	25
23	Fountain	19
24	Franklin	14
25	Fulton	9
26	Gibson	14
27	Grant	23
28	Greene	8
29	Hamilton	34
30	Hancock	14
31	Harrison	6
32	Hendricks	20
33	Henry	15
34	Howard	16
35	Huntington	22
36	Jackson	21
37	Jasper	12
38	Jay	8
39	Jefferson	15
40	Jennings	10
41	Johnson	22
42	Knox	21
43	Kosciusko	18
44	LaGrange	10
45	Lake	85
46	LaPorte	35
47	Lawrence	16
48	Madison	18
49.1	Marion: Center Township	193
49.2	Marion: Other	80
49.3	Marion: Duplicates	(1)
49.4	Marion: Total	272
50	Marshall	33
51	Martin	3
52	Miami	17
53	Monroe	52
54	Montgomery	22
55	Morgan	27
56	Newton	5
57	Noble	16
58	Ohio	4
59	Orange	18
60	Owen	18
61	Parke	47
62	Perry	9
63	Pike	3
64	Porter	43
65	Posey	18
66	Pulaski	8
67	Putnam	35
68	Randolph	14
69	Ripley	17
70	Rush	29
71	St. Joseph	102
72	Scott	3
73	Shelby	15
74	Spencer	10
75	Starke	3
76	Steuben	17
77	Sullivan	11
78	Switzerland	9
79	Tippecanoe	51
80	Tipton	3
81	Union	3
82	Vanderburgh	97
83	Vermillion	9
84	Vigo	53
85	Wabash	32
86	Warren	4
87	Warrick	9
88	Washington	11
89	Wayne	39
90	Wells	5
91	White	4
92	Whitley	6
(Duplicates):		13
Total:		2,179

== See also ==
- Indiana Register of Historic Sites and Structures
- List of archaeological sites on the National Register of Historic Places in Indiana
- List of bridges on the National Register of Historic Places in Indiana
- List of historical societies in Indiana
- List of Indiana covered bridges
- List of Indiana state historical markers
- List of National Historic Landmarks in Indiana
- List of railroad property on the National Register of Historic Places in Indiana
