= William W. Arnold (ornithologist) =

American physician and ornithologist (1843–1923)

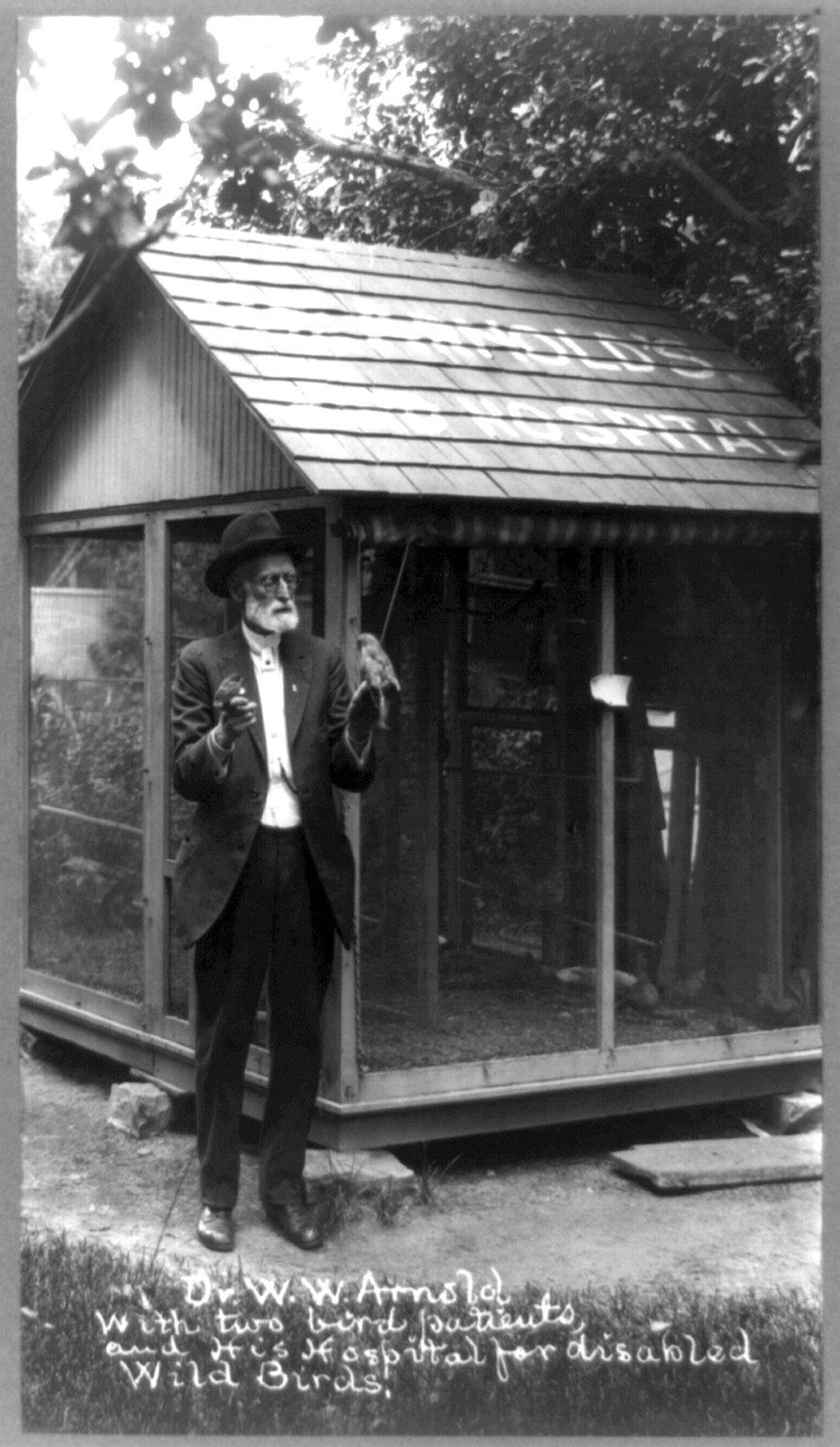
- Born: August 28, 1843; Connersville, Indiana, U.S.
- Died: March 30, 1923 (aged 79); Colorado Springs, Colorado, U.S.
- Burial place: Evergreen Cemetery
- Occupations: Physician, ornithologist
- Spouse: Mary Evelina (Eva) Shaw (m. 1863)
- Children: 2
- Relatives: Berthe Arnold (granddaughter)

William W. Arnold (commonly "W. W."; August 28, 1843 – March 30, 1923) was an American physician better known for his hobby as an ornithologist. Born in Connersville, Indiana, he initially practiced medicine near Rushville, Indiana. In 1886, he visited Colorado and decided to move there. He settled in Colorado Springs in October of that year. He operated a practice in downtown Colorado Springs and compounded medicine for his patients. He is best known as the founder and operator of a bird hospital, where he cared for ill and injured birds. He cared for domestic birds and had many wild birds after bad weather, like hail storms. He wrote articles about nature and birds and gave talks about them to schoolchildren in Colorado and Indiana. He was a physician and caregiver for the bird hospital until his death at age 79.

== Early years ==
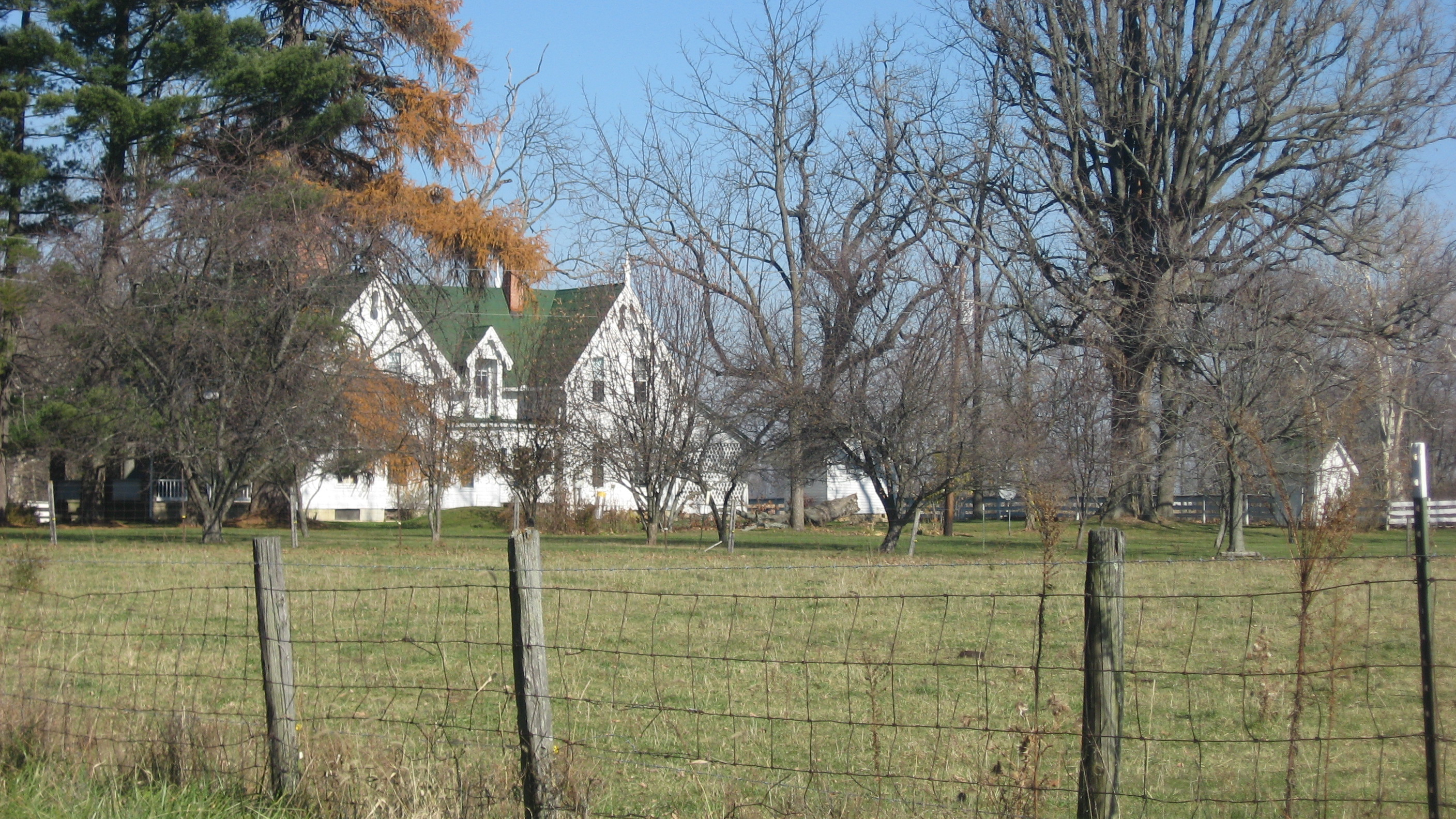
Dr. John Arnold Farm in Union Township, Rush County, Indiana. Built in 1853, it is listed on the National Register of Historic Places

Arnold was born August 28, 1843, in Connersville, Indiana. His father, Dr. John Arnold, born in 1815, came to the United States in 1820 or 1821 from the Isle of Wight. John had a medical practice at Connersville. His mother, Sara Ann Ball, descended from Davis Ball, an American Revolutionary War soldier, and Mary Hatfield. He had an older sister, Mary, and a younger brother, John. He was raised in Union Township, Rush County, Indiana, where the Arnolds were pioneers and had a 160-acre (65 ha) farm. Arnold was among the first students in a school that was established in 1847 by a well-educated minister, George Campbell. Within a year or two, a larger academy was built in Fairview to manage the influx of school children.

== Physician ==
In 1869, he treated a girl for pneumonia after her grandfather, a medicine man, had failed. In appreciation, Arnold was given a long-stemmed pipe and bear claw necklace and was adopted by the Chippewas of the Crow Wing Reservation in Minnesota. He and his fathers were members of the Indiana State Medical Society and were from Rushville.

He moved to Colorado Springs in October 1886, and was licensed to practice medicine there that year. He had an office in downtown Colorado Springs, where he compounded medicine for his patients. Arnold was a member of national, state, and El Paso County Medical Associations. He continued to practice medicine until a few days before his death.

== Ornithologist ==
He became an Associate Member of the American Ornithologists' Union in 1910 and a member of the Cooper Ornithological Club in 1911 and spent much of his later years advocating for bird protection. He frequently gave talks about birds to schoolchildren in Colorado and Indiana. A child from Colorado Springs brought a wounded bird to Arnold, who took care of it. More birds needing help were brought to him.

While still operating his medical practice, he and his wife operated a bird hospital for wild and domestic birds beginning around 1913. He treated wounded birds, set broken bones, and administered medicine; when they were healed, he released them. For instance, a hundred robins, as well as several other birds, were brought to Arnold after a severe hail storm. Some of the birds were blinded, some had broken wings, and some had feathers stripped off of their heads. He provided a home to crippled birds that were unable to care for themselves. Children helped care for the birds. Visitors spread the word about his work around the country.

He wrote the story "Stubby, The Bird Evangelist" about the life of a black-headed grosbeak that was published in the Colorado Springs Gazette in 1914. In it, Stubby was injured and taken to a bird hospital, where he was cared for until it was safe for him to fly again. In another article for the paper, Arnold explained what happened at the bird hospital, relating injuries to wings and a bird that was crippled when a car rode over it. He explained that over time he developed a routine for feeding with slim forceps and varying the birds' diet of berries, fruits, worms, and hamburger meat as they healed.

He created a bird section, was an associate editor for Colorado Sky and wrote articles for other publications. He regularly encouraged people to feed birds and to protect wildlife. He was a member of the Colorado Audubon Society.

== Personal life ==
He married Mary Evelina (Eva) Shaw on July 14, 1863, in Hopewell, Indiana. They had a son, Clarence, born about 1869, who became a surgeon, and a son John born about 1872 and died by 1923. His granddaughter was Berthe Arnold.

In July 1886, the Arnolds visited Colorado and decided to move there. According to the Colorado Springs Gazette, they were prominent members of the community.

Arnold was a member of the Sons of the American Revolution of Colorado. He died of influenza on March 30, 1923, in Colorado Springs. His wife Eva died on September 23, 1932 and both are buried at the Evergreen Cemetery in Colorado Springs, Colorado.

After her husband's death, Eva continued to operate the bird hospital with Augustus P. Brigham, who also established the Arnold Nature Club for children. The club taught 4th through 6th grade children about trees, flowers and birds. Prizes were given to children based on the number of flower and bird species that they identified.
