= Posey Township, Franklin County, Indiana =

Posey Township
- Township
- Location of Posey Township in Franklin County
- Coordinates: 39°28′41″N 85°16′13″W
- Country: United States
- State: Indiana
- County: Franklin

Government
  - Type: Indiana township

Area
  - Total: 18.15 sq mi (47.0 km^{2})
  - Land: 18.09 sq mi (46.9 km^{2})
  - Water: 0.06 sq mi (0.16 km^{2})
- Elevation: 1,014 ft (309 m)

Population (2020)
  - Total: 1,040
  - Density: 57.5/sq mi (22.2/km^{2})
- FIPS code: 18-61326
- GNIS feature ID: 453763

Posey Township is one of thirteen townships in Franklin County, Indiana, United States. As of the 2020 census, its population was 1,040, down from 1,051 at 2010.

Historical population
Census	Pop.	Note	%±
1890	882		—
1900	810		−8.2%
1910	713		−12.0%
1920	623		−12.6%
1930	614		−1.4%
1940	720		17.3%
1950	920		27.8%
1960	983		6.8%
1970	931		−5.3%
1980	1,124		20.7%
1990	930		−17.3%
2000	1,030		10.8%
2010	1,051		2.0%
2020	1,040		−1.0%
Source: US Decennial Census

== History ==
Posey Township is named for Thomas Posey, second Governor of Indiana Territory.

== Geography ==
According to the 2010 census, the township has a total area of 18.15 square miles (47.0 km^{2}), of which 18.09 square miles (46.9 km^{2}) (or 99.67%) is land and 0.06 square miles (0.16 km^{2}) (or 0.33%) is water.

=== Unincorporated towns ===
- Andersonville
- Buena Vista
- Lake View

(This list is based on USGS data and may include former settlements.)

=== Adjacent townships ===
- Orange Township, Fayette County (north)
- Columbia Township, Fayette County (northeast)
- Laurel Township (east)
- Salt Creek Township (southeast)
- Fugit Township, Decatur County (southwest)
- Richland Township, Rush County (west)
- Noble Township, Rush County (northwest)

=== Major highways ===
- U.S. Route 52
- Indiana State Road 244

=== Cemeteries ===
The township contains four cemeteries: Old Brick, Old Brick, Young Brick and Middle Brick.

== Education ==
Posey Township residents may obtain a free library card from the Franklin County Public Library District in Brookville.
