= Falmouth, Indiana =

- Unincorporated community
- Location within Indiana Location within the United States
- Coordinates: 39°42′03″N 85°18′04″W
- Country: United States
- State: Indiana
- County: Fayette, Rush
- Township: Fairview, Union, Washington
- Elevation: 1,043 ft (318 m)
- Time zone: UTC-5 (Eastern (EST))
  - Summer (DST): UTC-4 (EDT)
- ZIP code: 46127
- Area code: 765
- GNIS feature ID: 434385

Falmouth is an unincorporated community in Fayette and Rush counties in the U.S. state of Indiana. Located at the northeastern corner of Union Township and the southeastern corner of Washington Township in Rush County and along the northwestern edge of Fairview Township in Fayette County, it lies at the intersection of CR800E (Rush County) with CR600N (Rush County)/CR400N(Fayette County). Falmouth sits northwest of Connersville and northeast of Rushville, the county seats of Fayette and Rush counties respectively. Although Falmouth is unincorporated, it has a post office (located in Rush County), with the ZIP code of 46127.

== History ==
The first settlement at Falmouth was made about 1825. Falmouth was laid out in 1832. It was named after Falmouth, in England. The first post office in Falmouth opened in 1847.

An old variant name of the community was called Old Baker Settlement.
