= Orange Township, Fayette County, Indiana =

Orange Township
- Township
- Location of Orange Township in Fayette County
- Coordinates: 39°34′23″N 85°16′33″W
- Country: United States
- State: Indiana
- County: Fayette

Government
  - Type: Indiana township

Area
  - Total: 21.17 sq mi (54.8 km^{2})
  - Land: 21.14 sq mi (54.8 km^{2})
  - Water: 0.03 sq mi (0.078 km^{2})
- Elevation: 1,030 ft (314 m)

Population (2020)
  - Total: 700
  - Density: 34.8/sq mi (13.4/km^{2})
- FIPS code: 18-56736
- GNIS feature ID: 453689

Orange Township is one of nine townships in Fayette County, Indiana. As of the 2010 census, its population was 736 and it contained 296 housing units.

== History ==
Orange Township was organized in 1822. Many of its early settlers were natives of Orange County, North Carolina, hence the name.

== Geography ==
According to the 2010 census, the township has a total area of 21.17 square miles (54.8 km^{2}), of which 21.14 square miles (54.8 km^{2}) (or 99.86%) is land and 0.03 square miles (0.078 km^{2}) (or 0.14%) is water.

=== Cities and towns ===
- Glenwood (southeast edge)

=== Unincorporated community ===
- Orange

=== Adjacent townships ===
- Fairview Township (north)
- Connersville Township (northeast)
- Columbia Township (east)
- Laurel Township, Franklin County (southeast)
- Posey Township, Franklin County (south)
- Noble Township, Rush County (west)
- Union Township, Rush County (northwest)

=== Major highways ===
- Indiana State Road 44

=== Cemeteries ===
The township contains two cemeteries: Old Friends Church and Orange-North.
