= Richland, Indiana =

Richland, Indiana is the name of two places in Indiana.

- Richland, Spencer County, Indiana, a town in Spencer County
- Richland, Rush County, Indiana, an unincorporated community
