= Fairview Township, Fayette County, Indiana =

Fairview Township
- Township
- Location of Fairview Township in Fayette County
- Coordinates: 39°39′55″N 85°16′06″W
- Country: United States
- State: Indiana
- County: Fayette

Government
  - Type: Indiana township

Area
  - Total: 18.57 sq mi (48.1 km^{2})
  - Land: 18.57 sq mi (48.1 km^{2})
  - Water: 0 sq mi (0 km^{2})
- Elevation: 1,056 ft (322 m)

Population (2020)
  - Total: 342
  - Density: 18.7/sq mi (7.2/km^{2})
- FIPS code: 18-22522
- GNIS feature ID: 453289

Fairview Township is one of nine townships in Fayette County, Indiana. As of the 2010 census, its population was 347 and it contained 143 housing units.

== History ==
Fairview Township was organized in Dec. 1851 from parts of Harrison and Orange townships.

== Geography ==
According to the 2010 census, the township has a total area of 18.57 square miles (48.1 km^{2}), all land.

=== Cities and towns ===
- Glenwood (northeast edge)

=== Unincorporated towns ===
- Fairview

=== Adjacent townships ===
- Posey Township (north)
- Harrison Township (east)
- Connersville Township (southeast)
- Orange Township (south)
- Union Township, Rush County (west)
- Washington Township, Rush County (northwest)

=== Major highways ===
- Indiana State Road 44
