= Buena Vista, Indiana =

Buena Vista, Indiana may refer to:

- Buena Vista, Franklin County, Indiana
- Buena Vista, Gibson County, Indiana
- Buena Vista, Harrison County, Indiana
- Buena Vista, Randolph County, Indiana
