= Circleville =

Circleville may refer to a community in the United States:

- Circleville, Indiana
- Circleville, Kansas
- Circleville, Missouri, in Cape Girardeau County
- Circleville, New York
- Circleville, Ohio
- Circleville, Pennsylvania, in Westmoreland County
- Circleville, Texas
- Circleville, Utah
- Circleville, West Virginia
- Circleville, Virginia, in Loudoun County
