= Noble Township, Indiana =

Noble Township is the name of seven townships in the U.S. state of Indiana:

- Noble Township, Cass County, Indiana
- Noble Township, Jay County, Indiana
- Noble Township, LaPorte County, Indiana
- Noble Township, Noble County, Indiana
- Noble Township, Rush County, Indiana
- Noble Township, Shelby County, Indiana
- Noble Township, Wabash County, Indiana
