= New Salem, Rush County, Indiana =

New Salem
- Unincorporated community
- Location within Indiana Location within the United States
- Coordinates: 39°32′32″N 85°21′29″W
- Country: United States
- State: Indiana
- County: Rush
- Township: Noble
- Elevation: 1,034 ft (315 m)
- Time zone: UTC-5 (Eastern (EST))
  - Summer (DST): UTC-4 (EDT)
- ZIP code: 46173
- Area code: 765
- GNIS feature ID: 440109

New Salem is an unincorporated community in Noble Township, Rush County, in the U.S. state of Indiana.

== History ==
New Salem was platted in 1831. A post office was established at New Salem in 1831, and remained in operation until it was discontinued in 1943.
