= Lake View, Indiana =

- Unincorporated community and Census-designated place
- Location within Indiana Location within the United States
- Coordinates: 39°29′12″N 85°15′08″W
- Country: United States
- State: Indiana
- County: Franklin
- Township: Posey
- Elevation: 1,017 ft (310 m)
- ZIP code: 47024
- FIPS code: 18-41580
- GNIS feature ID: 2830378

Lake View is an unincorporated community in Posey Township, Franklin County, Indiana.

== Demographics ==
The United States Census Bureau delineated Lake View as a census designated place in the 2022 American Community Survey.
