= Walker Township, Rush County, Indiana =

Walker Township
- Township
- Coordinates: 39°34′22″N 85°34′36″W
- Country: United States
- State: Indiana
- County: Rush

Government
  - Type: Indiana township

Area
  - Total: 29.93 sq mi (77.5 km^{2})
  - Land: 29.93 sq mi (77.5 km^{2})
  - Water: 0 sq mi (0 km^{2})
- Elevation: 909 ft (277 m)

Population (2020)
  - Total: 800
  - Density: 27/sq mi (10/km^{2})
- Time zone: UTC-5 (Eastern (EST))
  - Summer (DST): UTC-4 (EDT)
- Area code: 765
- FIPS code: 18-79658
- GNIS feature ID: 453969

Walker Township is one of twelve townships in Rush County, Indiana. As of the 2020 census, its population was 800 and it contained 350 housing units.

Historical population
Census	Pop.	Note	%±
1890	1,334		—
1900	1,361		2.0%
1910	1,173		−13.8%
1920	1,192		1.6%
1930	1,104		−7.4%
1940	991		−10.2%
1950	1,075		8.5%
1960	1,146		6.6%
1970	1,100		−4.0%
1980	1,057		−3.9%
1990	966		−8.6%
2000	916		−5.2%
2010	856		−6.6%
2020	800		−6.5%
Source: US Decennial Census

Walker Township was organized in 1826.

== Geography ==
According to the 2010 census, the township has a total area of 29.93 square miles (77.5 km^{2}), all land.

=== Unincorporated towns ===
- Manilla at 39.5742139°N 85.6194194°W
- Homer at 39.5781027°N 85.5780295°W

(This list is based on USGS data and may include former settlements.)
