= Norris Ford Covered Bridge =

- U.S. National Register of Historic Places
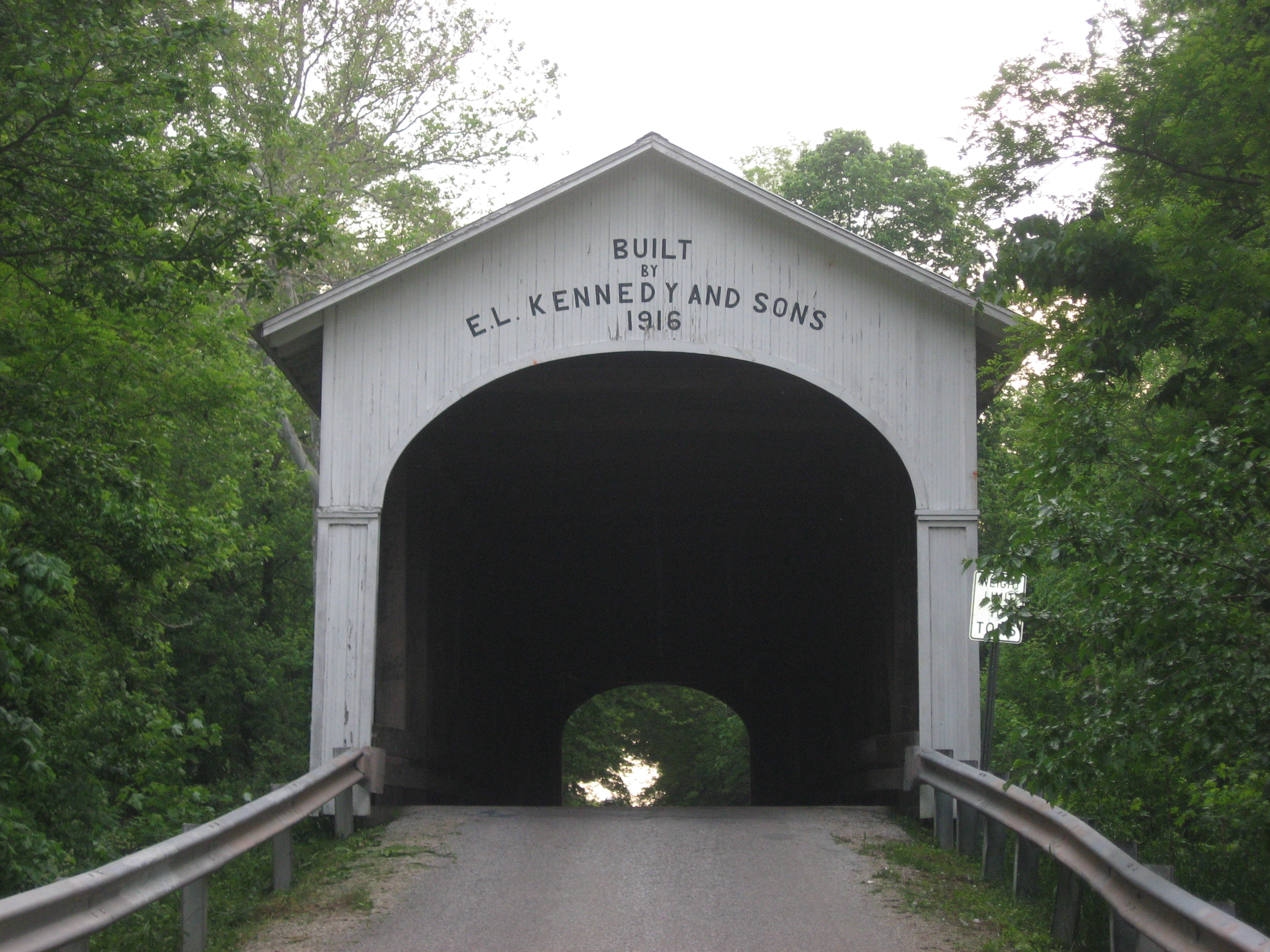
- Norris Ford Covered Bridge, May 2011

- Location within Indiana Location within the United States
- Location: E. County Road 150N, northeast of Rushville in Rushville Township, Rush County, Indiana
- Coordinates: 39.655333°N 85.4095°W
- Area: less than one acre
- Built: 1916
- Built by: Kennedy, Emmett, L., Karl, & Charles R.
- Architectural style: Burr Arch Truss System
- MPS: Kennedy, A. M., House and Covered Bridges of Rush County TR
- NRHP reference No.: 83000097
- Added to NRHP: February 2, 1983

Norris Ford Covered Bridge is a historic covered bridge located near Rushville in Rushville Township, Rush County, Indiana. It was built in 1916 by Emmett L. Kennedy and his sons Karl and Charles. It is a Burr Arch bridge, 154 feet (47 m) long over Big Flat Rock Creek. The bridge has rounded arch portals and does not have the decorative scrollwork and brackets that are signatures of the Kennedy firm, due to them being out of vogue by 1916.

It was listed on the U.S. National Register of Historic Places in 1983, as part of a multiple property submission covering six bridges built by the Kennedy family firm.
