= Hall-Crull Octagonal House =

Historic house in Indiana, United States

- U.S. National Register of Historic Places
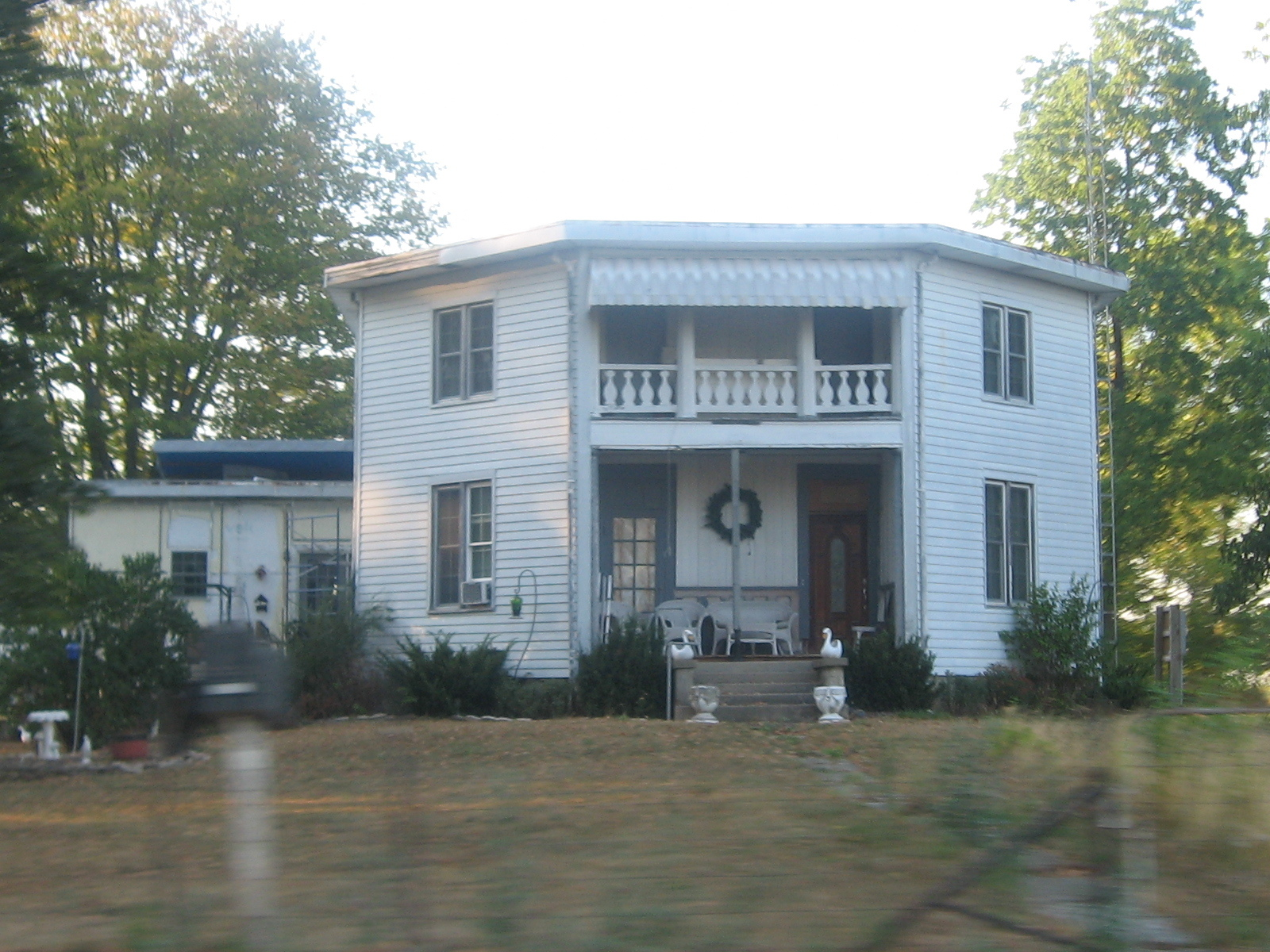
- Roadside view of the house

- Location within Indiana Location within the United States
- Location: North of Rushville in Washington Township, Rush County, Indiana
- Coordinates: 39°44′39″N 85°23′10″W
- Area: less than one acre
- Built: 1855, 1865
- Architectural style: Octagon Mode
- NRHP reference No.: 84001575
- Added to NRHP: May 10, 1984

The Hall-Crull Octagonal House, also known as the Walter Crull Farm, is an historic octagon house located in Washington Township, Rush County, Indiana. It was built in 1855, and is a two-story, frame dwelling with a rear addition constructed in 1865. It features a recessed two-story porch on the front facade supported by octagonal columns.

It was listed on the National Register of Historic Places in 1984.

== See also ==
- List of Registered Historic Places in Indiana
