= Occident, Indiana =

- Unincorporated community
- Location within Indiana Location within the United States
- Coordinates: 39°41′28″N 85°28′42″W
- Country: United States
- State: Indiana
- County: Rush
- Township: Jackson
- Elevation: 984 ft (300 m)
- Time zone: UTC-5 (Eastern (EST))
  - Summer (DST): UTC-4 (EDT)
- ZIP code: 46173
- Area code: 765
- GNIS feature ID: 440496

Occident is an unincorporated community in Jackson Township, Rush County, in the U.S. state of Indiana.

== History ==
Occident was known as Tail Holt until 1882.

A post office was established at Occident in 1882, and remained in operation until it was discontinued in 1900.
