= Homer, Indiana =

- Unincorporated community and Census-designated place
- Location within Indiana Location within the United States
- Coordinates: 39°34′42″N 85°34′39″W
- Country: United States
- State: Indiana
- County: Rush
- Township: Walker
- Elevation: 906 ft (276 m)
- Time zone: UTC-5 (Eastern (EST))
  - Summer (DST): UTC-4 (EDT)
- ZIP code: 46146
- Area code: 765
- GNIS feature ID: 2830518

Homer (also Goddard or Slabtown) is an unincorporated community in central Walker Township, Rush County, in the U.S. state of Indiana. Although Homer is unincorporated, it has a post office, with the ZIP code of 46146.

== History ==
Homer was originally called Slabtown, and under the latter name had its start around 1850 when a sawmill was established at that point.

A post office was established under the name Goddard in 1840 and was discontinued in 1852. Another post office with the name Homer ran from 1854 to 2000.

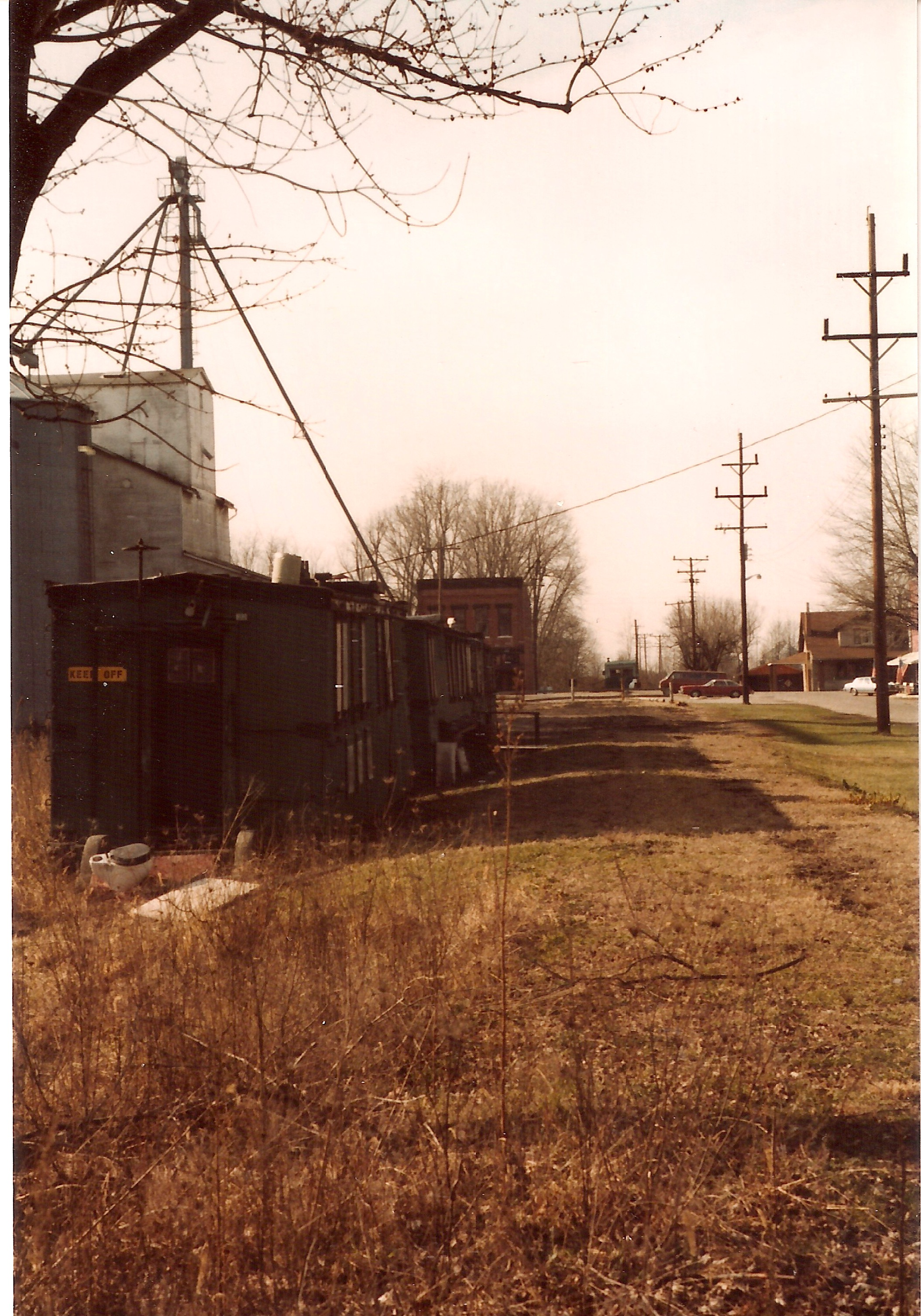
Abandoned train cars served as sleeping quarters for Rush County youth who attended the Homer workshops from the 1960s into the 1980s. This photo was snapped in 1982.

Beginning in 1967, the village became the site for many workshops for Rush County youth. Elementary children through high schoolers attended summer weekend camps in drama, speech, history, woodworking, photography, fitness, and creative writing. Hundreds of children in the 1960s and into the 1980s spent part of their summers here. The boys slept in shuttered trains cars while the girls camped in a nearby barn and later in the basement of the Homer Federated Church.

== Demographics ==
The United States Census Bureau delineated Homer as a census designated place in the 2022 American Community Survey.

== Notable people ==
- Marjorie Pebworth, Illinois legislator, was born in Homer.
