= Raleigh, Indiana =

- Unincorporated community
- Location within Indiana Location within the United States
- Coordinates: 39°44′38″N 85°21′50″W
- Country: United States
- State: Indiana
- County: Rush
- Township: Washington
- Elevation: 1,011 ft (308 m)
- Time zone: UTC-5 (Eastern (EST))
  - Summer (DST): UTC-4 (EDT)
- ZIP code: 46173
- Area code: 765
- GNIS feature ID: 441751

Raleigh is an unincorporated community in Washington Township, Rush County, in the U.S. state of Indiana.

== History ==
Raleigh was platted in 1847. The community's name comes from Raleigh, North Carolina.

A post office was established at Raleigh in 1847, and remained in operation until it was discontinued in 1902.
