= East Hill Cemetery (Rushville, Indiana) =

Historic cemetery in Indiana, US

- U.S. National Register of Historic Places
- U.S. Historic district
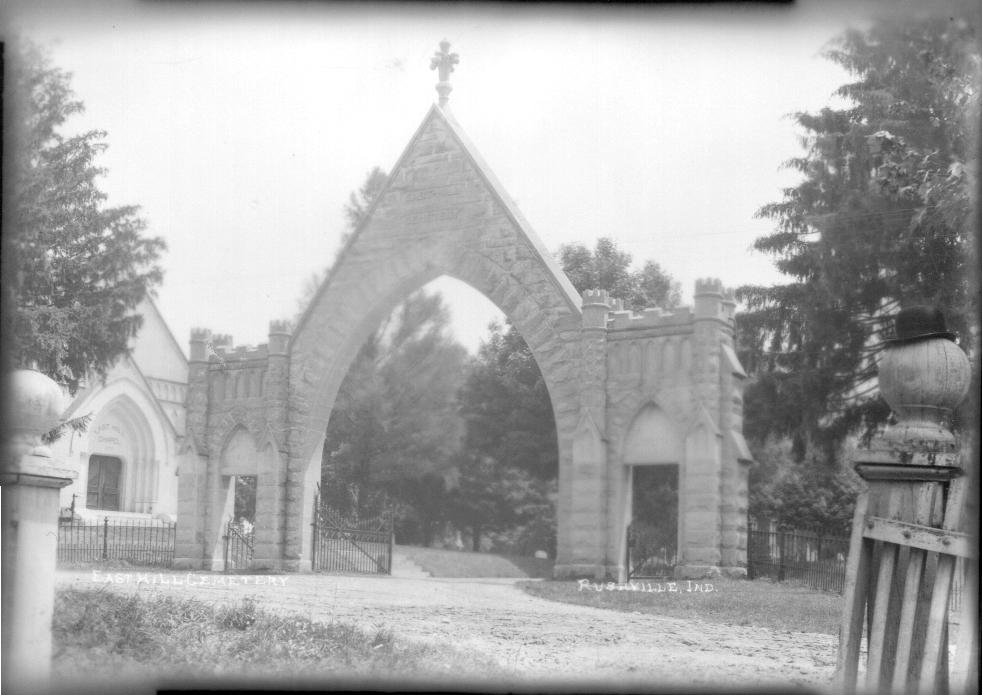
- View of East Hill Cemetery entrance

- Location within Indiana Location within the United States
- Location: 704 E. State Road 44, east of Rushville in Rushville Township, Rush County, Indiana
- Coordinates: 39°36′24″N 85°25′57″W
- Area: 60 acres (24 ha)
- Built: 1859
- Architect: Weltz, Leopold
- Architectural style: Romanesque, Gothic Revival, Art Deco
- NRHP reference No.: 14001039
- Added to NRHP: December 16, 2014

East Hill Cemetery is a historic cemetery and national historic district located in Rushville Township, Rush County, Indiana. The cemetery was established in 1859 and contains about 14,000 burials. Among the contributing resources are the Gothic Revival entrance arch, a public mausoleum (1935), Payne family mausoleum, Logan family mausoleum, Wilkison crypt, Havens monument, Willkie Memorial designed by sculptor Malvina Hoffman (1885–1966), and the Civil War Monument. The cemetery features numerous examples of high Victorian gravestone art featuring statuary and reliefs. Among the notable burials is Republican presidential candidate Wendell Willkie (1892–1944).

It was listed on the National Register of Historic Places in 2014.
