= Glenwood, Indiana =

- Town
- Town of Glenwood
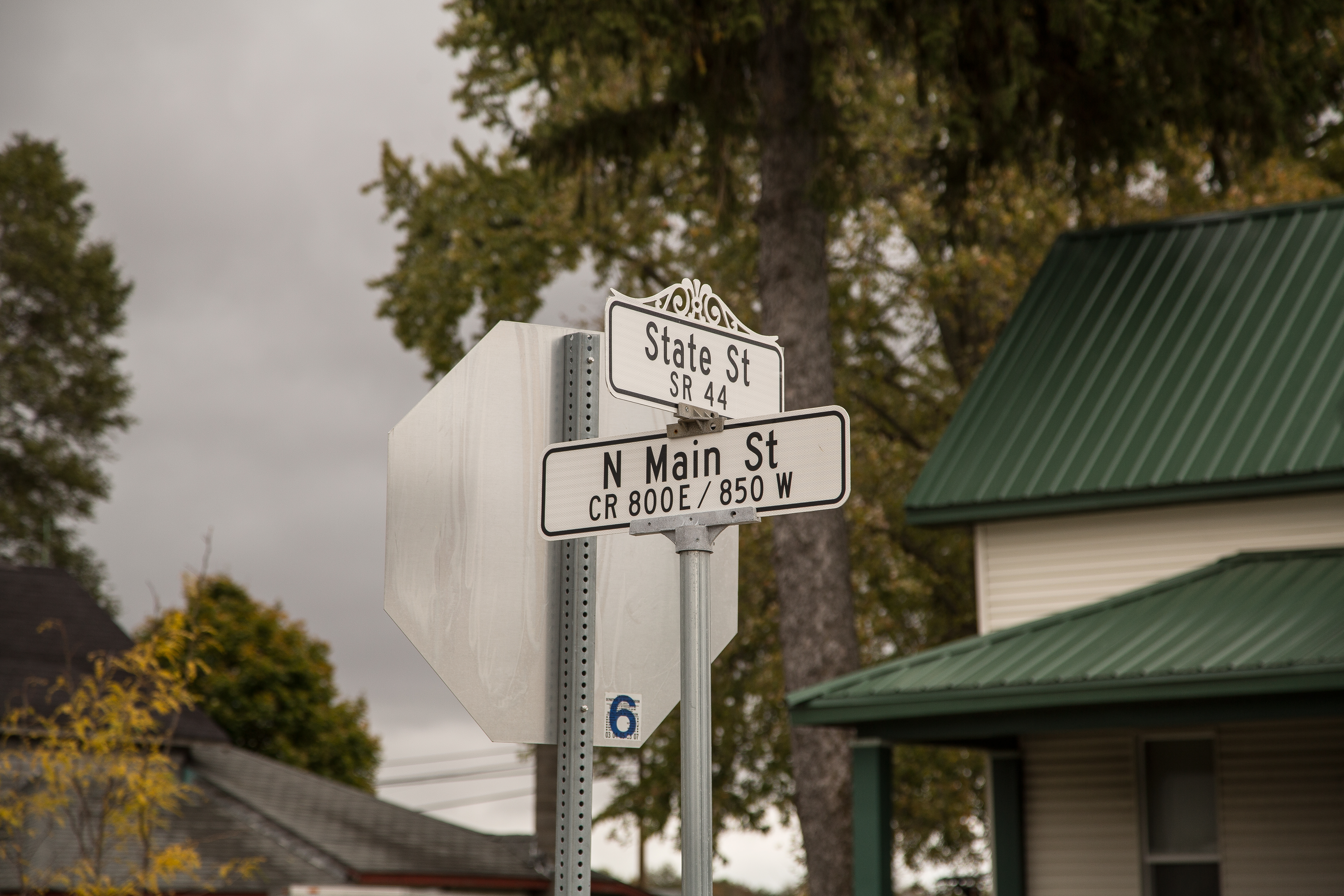

- Logo

- Location of Glenwood in Fayette County and Rush County, Indiana.
- Coordinates: 39°37′29″N 85°18′09″W
- Country: United States
- State: Indiana
- Counties: Rush, Fayette
- Townships: Union, Orange, Fairview
- Founded: 1882
- Incorporated: 1906

Area
  - Total: 0.19 sq mi (0.50 km^{2})
  - Land: 0.19 sq mi (0.50 km^{2})
  - Water: 0 sq mi (0.00 km^{2})
- Elevation: 1,076 ft (328 m)

Population (2020)
  - Total: 245
  - Density: 1,276.6/sq mi (492.89/km^{2})
- Time zone: UTC-5 (EST)
  - Summer (DST): UTC-5 (EST)
- ZIP code: 46133
- Area code: 765
- FIPS code: 18-28062
- GNIS feature ID: 2396962
- Website: glenwoodtown.com

Glenwood is a town in Union Township, Rush County and in Orange and Fairview townships, Fayette County in the U.S. state of Indiana. The population was 245 at the 2020 census.

== History ==
Glenwood was originally called Vienna, and under the latter name was laid out in 1882. The Glenwood post office has been in operation since 1874.

In 1906, Glenwood was incorporated as a town.

== Geography ==
According to the 2010 census, Glenwood has a total area of 0.18 square miles (0.47 km^{2}), all land.

== Demographics ==
Historical population
Census	Pop.	Note	%±
1880	216		—
1910	266		—
1920	324		21.8%
1930	374		15.4%
1940	338		−9.6%
1950	412		21.9%
1960	382		−7.3%
1970	452		18.3%
1980	370		−18.1%
1990	285		−23.0%
2000	318		11.6%
2010	250		−21.4%
2020	245		−2.0%
U.S. Decennial Census

=== 2010 census ===
As of the census of 2010, there were 250 people, 109 households, and 71 families living in the town. The population density was 1,388.9 inhabitants per square mile (536.3/km^{2}). There were 130 housing units at an average density of 722.2 per square mile (278.8/km^{2}). The racial makeup of the town was 100.0% White. Hispanic or Latino of any race were 0.4% of the population.

There were 109 households, of which 28.4% had children under the age of 18 living with them, 51.4% were married couples living together, 8.3% had a female householder with no husband present, 5.5% had a male householder with no wife present, and 34.9% were non-families. 30.3% of all households were made up of individuals, and 15.6% had someone living alone who was 65 years of age or older. The average household size was 2.29 and the average family size was 2.83.

The median age in the town was 45.5 years. 22.4% of residents were under the age of 18; 4.8% were between the ages of 18 and 24; 21.6% were from 25 to 44; 30.8% were from 45 to 64; and 20.4% were 65 years of age or older. The gender makeup of the town was 45.6% male and 54.4% female.

=== 2000 census ===
At the 2000 census, there were 318 people, 124 households and 89 families living in the town. The population density was 1,839.9 inhabitants per square mile (710.4/km^{2}). There were 137 housing units at an average density of 792.7 per square mile (306.1/km^{2}). The racial makeup of the town was 100.00% White.

There were 124 households, of which 33.1% had children under the age of 18 living with them, 58.9% were married couples living together, 6.5% had a female householder with no husband present, and 28.2% were non-families. 27.4% of all households were made up of individuals, and 14.5% had someone living alone who was 65 years of age or older. The average household size was 2.56 and the average family size was 3.06.

28.6% of the population were under the age of 18, 6.9% from 18 to 24, 26.7% from 25 to 44, 21.4% from 45 to 64, and 16.4% who were 65 years of age or older. The median age was 36 years. For every 100 females, there were 86.0 males. For every 100 females age 18 and over, there were 87.6 males.

The median household income was $33,750, and the median family income was $40,625. Males had a median income of $38,750 versus $18,929 for females. The per capita income for the town was $13,171. About 8.4% of families and 14.5% of the population were below the poverty line, including 24.7% of those under age 18 and 14.3% of those age 65 or over.
