= Andersonville, Indiana =

- Unincorporated town and Census-designated place
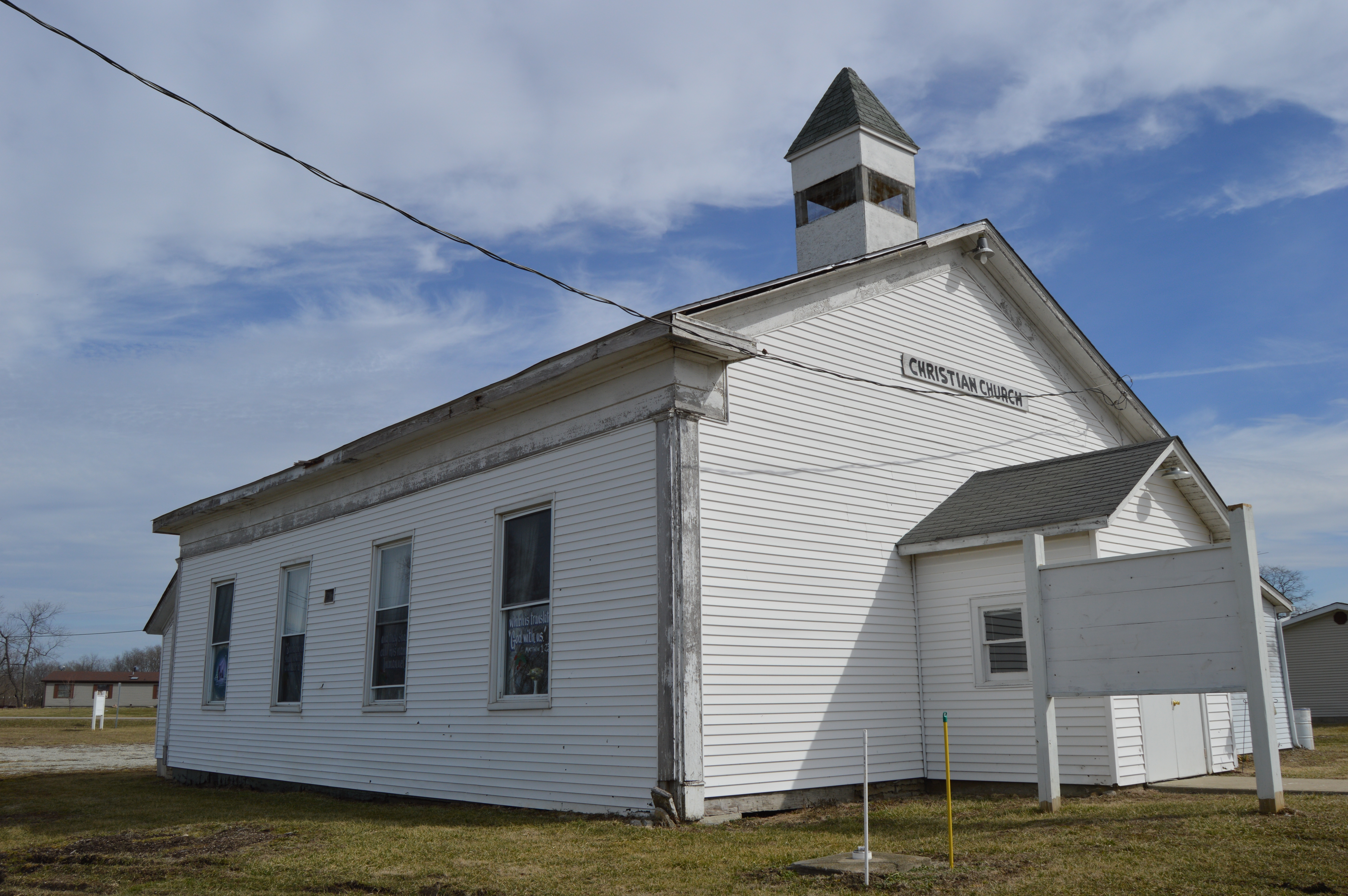
- Andersonville Christian Church

- Location within Indiana
- Coordinates: 39°29′58″N 85°17′10″W
- Country: United States
- State: Indiana
- County: Franklin
- Township: Posey
- Elevation: 1,043 ft (318 m)
- ZIP code: 47024
- GNIS feature ID: 2830375

Andersonville is an unincorporated town in Posey Township in the northwest corner of Franklin County, Indiana, United States.

== History ==
On October 17, 1820, the government granted 160 acres to John and Simeon Barber/Barbour. Andersonville, the original town known as Ceylon, was laid out in October 1831 by Simeon Barber in 1831. It was 78 lots. The original streets (in use today) were laid out 66 feet wide and alleys were 16 1/2 feet wide. The Anderson Addition was laid out by Joel (Joseph) Anderson and Fletcher Tevis in 1837 with additional lots and streets. Anderson P.O. was established. The two additions merged and it was renamed in 1849 after Thomas Anderson, a tavern owner. In 1915, Andersonville had about 350 inhabitants.

== Geography ==
Andersonville is located at an elevation of 1050 feet. It lies at the intersection of U.S. Route 52 and the east end of Indiana State Road 244; this forms an acute angle, and the named streets run north and south in the triangle thus formed.

== Demographics ==
The United States Census Bureau delineated Andersonville as a census designated place in the 2022 American Community Survey.
