= Gings, Indiana =

- Unincorporated community
- Location within Indiana Location within the United States
- Coordinates: 39°40′15″N 85°22′15″W
- Country: United States
- State: Indiana
- County: Rush
- Township: Union
- Elevation: 1,001 ft (305 m)
- Time zone: UTC-5 (Eastern (EST))
  - Summer (DST): UTC-4 (EDT)
- ZIP code: 46173
- Area code: 765
- GNIS feature ID: 435089

Gings is an unincorporated community in Union Township, Rush County, in the U.S. state of Indiana.

== History ==
Gings was platted in 1870, and named for its founder, Michael Ging. An old variant name of the community was called Star.

A post office was established under the name Star in 1853, was renamed Gings in 1890 and remained in operation until it was discontinued in 1905.
