= Marjorie Pebworth =

American politician

Member of the Illinois House of Representatives

Personal details
- Party: Republican

Mary Marjorie (née Mull) Pebworth (August 19, 1910 – April 3, 1967) was an American politician.

Born in Homer, Indiana, Pebworth received her bachelor's degree from Indiana University Bloomington in 1932 and then worked at the Indiana General Assembly Legislative Reference Bureau. In 1949, Pebworth and her husband Robert moved to Illinois. Pebworth served on the high school and junior college boards and was a Republican. She lived in Riverdale, Illinois.

From 1965 until her death in 1967, Pebworth served in the Illinois House of Representatives. Pebworth died at her home in Riverdale, Illinois.
