= Berthe Arnold =

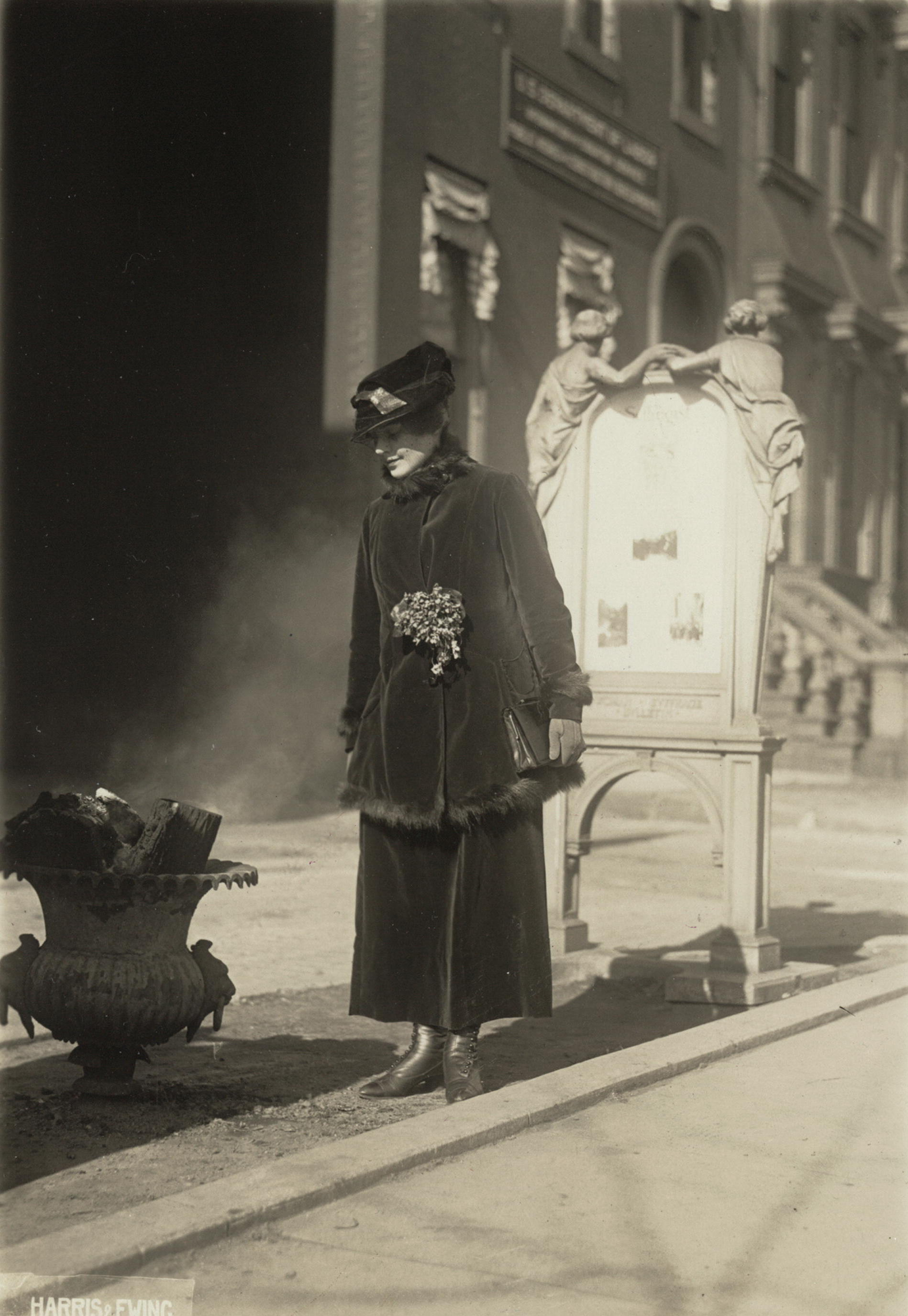
Berthe Arnold looking downward at an urn containing a burning "watchfire" maintained in front of National Woman's Party headquarters in Washington, D.C. Harris & Ewing, Washington, D.C. (photographer), January 1919, Library of Congress (Note: Photograph published in Doris Stevens, Jailed For Freedom (New York: Boni and Liveright, 1920), between pages 274 and 275.)

Berthe Arnold, also known as Berthe Arnold Knorr (June 14, 1896 – December 30, 1968) was a suffragist and a National Woman's Party organizer from Colorado Springs, Colorado. She participated in protests for women's right to vote, during which she was attacked by mobs and arrested, until the passage of the Nineteenth Amendment to the United States Constitution.

== Early life ==
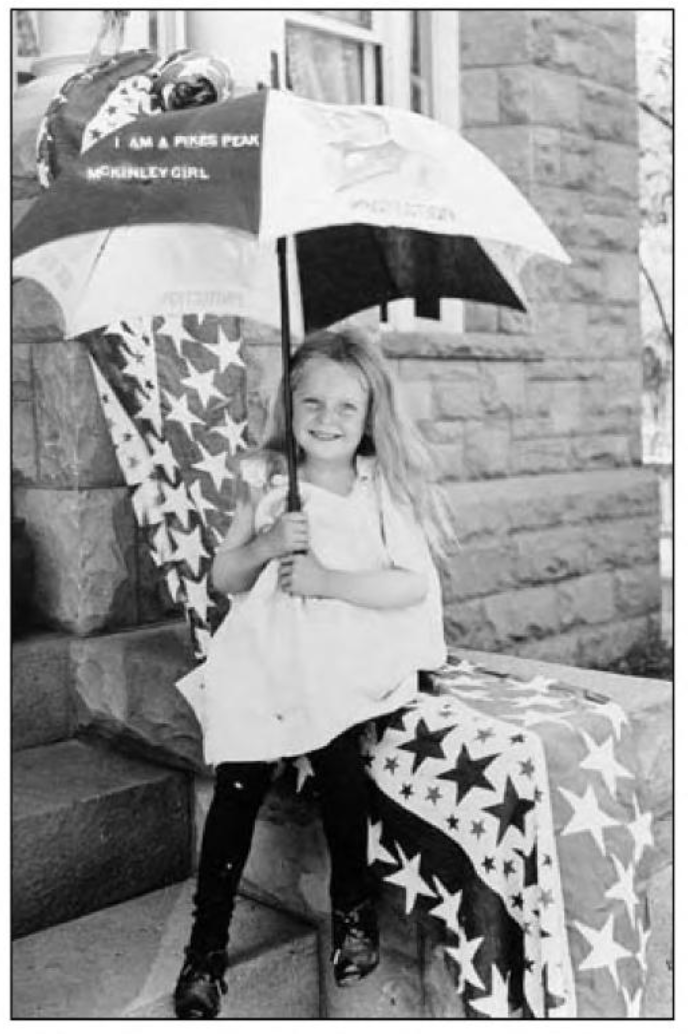
Berthe Louise Arnold, sitting on the front step at the home of her grandfather, Dr. W. W. Arnold, 1900. Holding a Protection Umbrella, with the words "I am a Pikes Peak McKinley Girl", used in 1898 campaign. Special Collections, Tutt Library, Colorado College, Colorado Springs, Colorado

Berthe Louise Arnold, the daughter of Louisa Calhoun and Clarence Arnold, was born June 14, 1896, in Colorado Springs, Colorado. Her father was a physician. She had a sister Evelyn born about 1900. Her maternal grandfather was John R. Calhoun of Philadelphia. Her paternal grandfather was Dr. W. W. Arnold, the pioneer physician of Colorado Springs.

She graduated from Colorado Springs High School in 1917 and went to Washington, D.C. that year or the following year to protest for women's right to vote. She studied elementary education and voice at Colorado College in 1914 and by May 1918 as a Special and Registered Visitor. She was a first soprano in the Girl's Glee Club. She is also said to have attended Colorado State University. She studied music in Philadelphia.

== Teacher ==
She was a kindergarten teacher during the time which she protested for women's right to vote. After arriving in Washington, D.C., she said, "After the demonstration is over, I go back to take up my kindergarten work in Colorado Springs."

== Suffragist ==
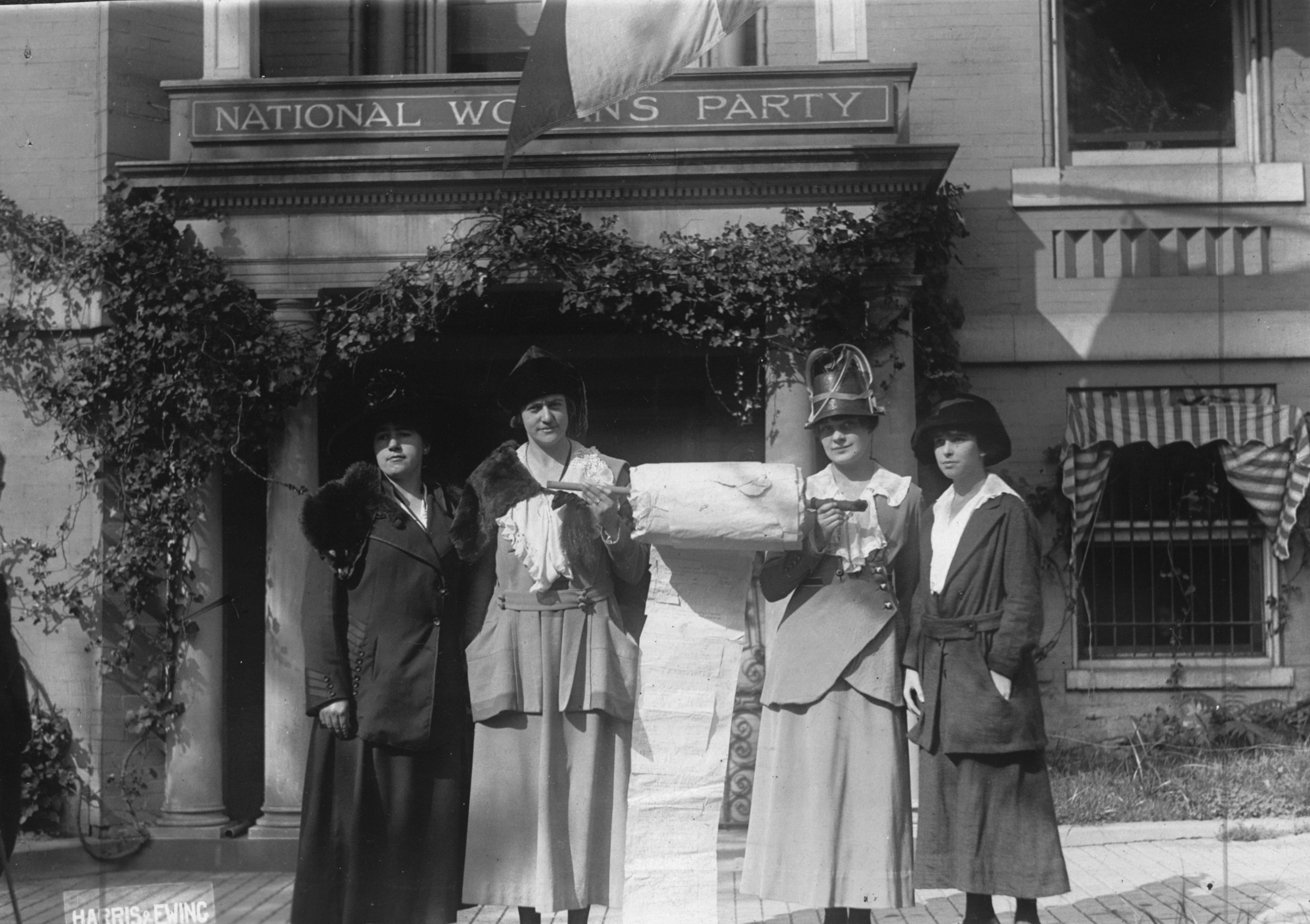
Following the Senate's defeat of the woman suffrage amendment in March 1914, lobbying and petitioning efforts organized by the National Woman's Party continued with fervency. This photograph of suffragists carrying a large rolled petition for Senator Andrieus A. Jones, the chairman of the Senate Committee on Woman Suffrage, was carried to the Senate by Annie Fraher of Boston, Bertha Moller of Minneapolis, Berthe Arnold of Colorado Springs, and Anita Pollitzer of Charleston, South Carolina. The photograph was taken in front of the National Woman's Party headquarters.

She was among a group of women of the Congressional Union for Woman Suffrage (CU), founded in 1913 by Lucy Burns and Alice Paul. The National Woman's Party (NWP) was considered a radical suffragist organization. Upon coming to Washington D.C. in 1918, she became Alice Paul's private secretary and participated in suffragist non-violent protests, realizing that she could be arrested and jailed.

We hope you find Berthe Arnold a help. I made it clear to her that jail was her objective, and that whatever the most militant of you in Washington do, we expect of her. I have been talking to her mother who was rather worried last night, we cannot wonder at such a sudden departure of her child. But she said Berthe's father said to her the she was very foolish to feel worried, because there can be no progress with just such efforts as we are making, and it is fine for Berthe to have a part in it.

— Dr. Caroline E. Spencer

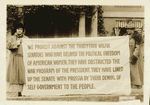
Bertha Moller, left, and Bertha Arnold hold party banner which was held at the Senate Office Building, Washington, D.C., ca. 1917, Library of Congress

As did Dr. Caroline E. Spencer and Natalie Gray, she left Colorado Springs for Washington, D.C, putting her education and career on hold. She was arrested multiple times in the capitol, including when protesting at the White House. The charge was "obstructing the traffic", but unofficially it was due to militant feminism. Suffragists were jailed for several days up to a seven months. The suffragists executed "theatrically staged political demonstrations" protesting inaction on the constitutional amendment to give women the right to vote and against the treatment suffragists received when imprisoned. Arnold planned execution of the protests and was one of the youngest suffragists to be arrested and imprisoned.

In late August 1918, she joined the White House pickets. She participated in a protest at the Lafayette Monument. Among forty protesters, the group burned papers printed with President Woodrow Wilson's "empty words about democracy". She spoke at the demonstration:

'Lafayette, here we are!' We, the women of the United States, denied the liberty which you helped to gain, and for which we have asked in vain for sixty years, turn to you to plead for us.

— Berthe Arnold

At a protest in late 1918, suffragists intended to burn the empty words of anti-suffragist senators in the Senate chambers, but the police confiscated banners and flags from the women and held them for several hours. On December 16, 1918, she was among a group of 1000 women who marched up the steps of the capital in protest. The police dragged some of the women to the ground or down the stairs of the capitol with "brutality".

In January 1919, her activities were reported in the Colorado Springs Gazette, including "Miss Arnold in Next Watchfire Party at Capitol", followed by news of her arrest and sentencing. She was arrested at the Watchfires for Justice protest in January 1919, when President Wilson's words about democracy were burned in cauldrons. She was sentenced to five days in jail, during which she went on a hunger strike.

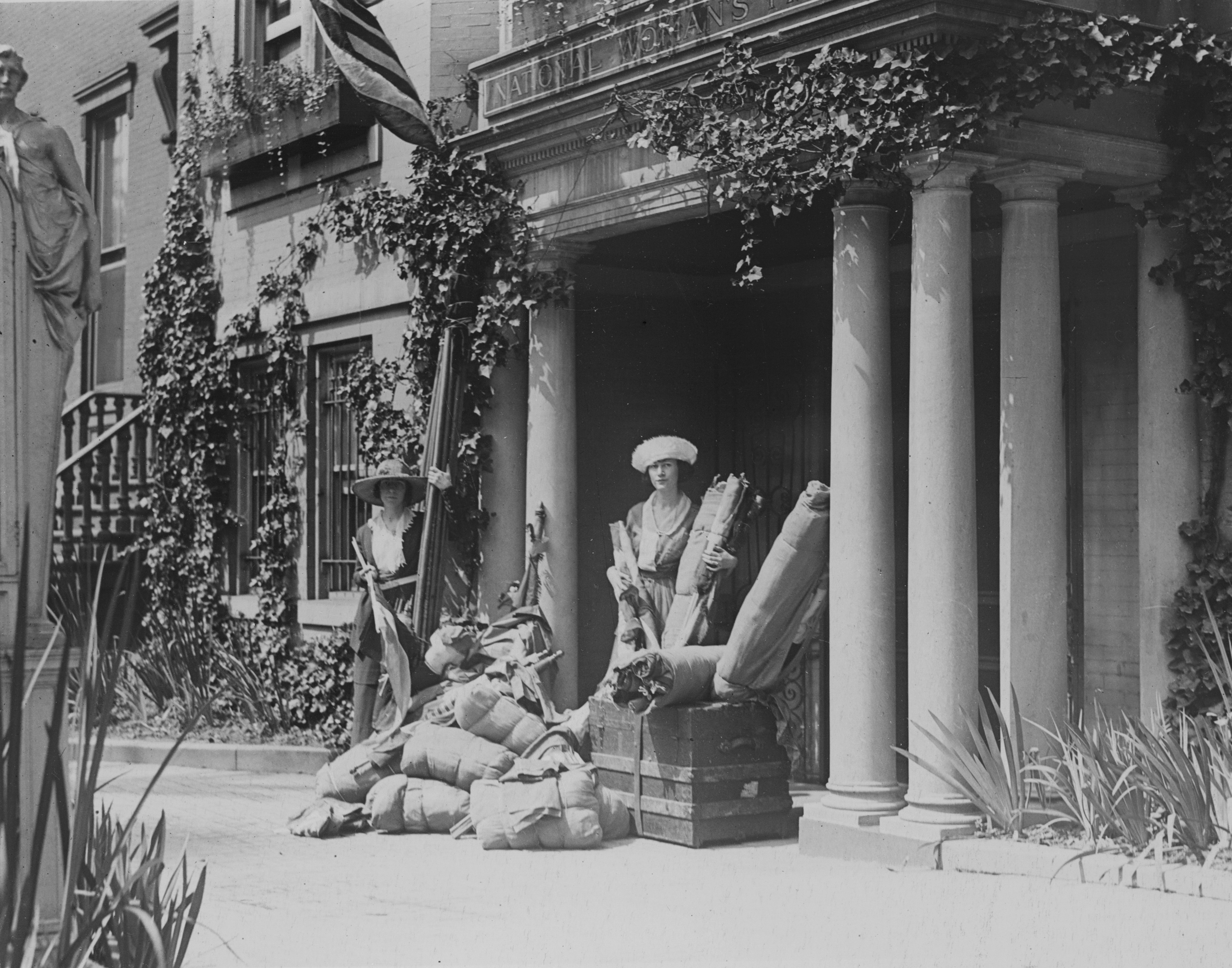
Two National Woman's Party members standing with luggage and supplies for the "Prison Special" tour, in front of the NWP headquarters in Washington, D.C.

She joined a group of suffragists who traveled the western United States in February and March 1919. While wearing prison clothing, they spoke to audiences about their protests and the way in which they were attacked by angry mobs and arrested. Traveling by train to various cities, they called themselves the "Democracy Limited" and the "Prison Special. She was a National Woman's Party organizer, including her efforts in Florida and New Hampshire, until women received the right to vote with the passage of the Nineteenth Amendment to the United States Constitution on August 18, 1920. By that time, she was secretary to the head of a private school and lived with her parents in Colorado Springs.

She portrayed Lucretia Mott in an Equal Rights Amendment pageant at the Garden of the Gods in 1923 at Colorado Springs.

== Personal life ==
Berthe Arnold married Frederick Knorr, a musician from Colorado Springs, on September 7, 1921, in Denver. They had a daughter named Jean, who married William Johnson and lived in La Mesa, California. The Knorr family lived in Denver, Colorado by 1940.

She was a member of the Daughters of the American Revolution, having descended from Davis Ball and Mary Hatfield through her great-grandmother Sara Ann Ball, who married John Arnold, M.D. Knorr died December 30, 1968, in San Diego, California or at the home of her daughter in La Mesa, California (east of downtown San Diego).

== Sources ==
- Blevins, Tim (2010). Extraordinary Women of the Rocky Mountain West. Pikes Peak Library District. p. 245. ISBN 978-1-56735-277-1.
