= Henderson, Indiana =

- Unincorporated community
- Location within Indiana Location within the United States
- Coordinates: 39°40′10″N 85°31′13″W
- Country: United States
- State: Indiana
- County: Rush
- Township: Jackson
- Elevation: 948 ft (289 m)
- Time zone: UTC-5 (Eastern (EST))
  - Summer (DST): UTC-4 (EDT)
- ZIP code: 46173
- Area code: 765
- GNIS feature ID: 436004

Henderson is an unincorporated community in Jackson Township, Rush County, in the U.S. state of Indiana.

== History ==
Henderson was founded in 1890 by Ida M. Henderson.

A post office was established at Henderson in 1890, and remained in operation until it was discontinued in 1903.
