= Rushville Township, Rush County, Indiana =

Rushville Township
- Township
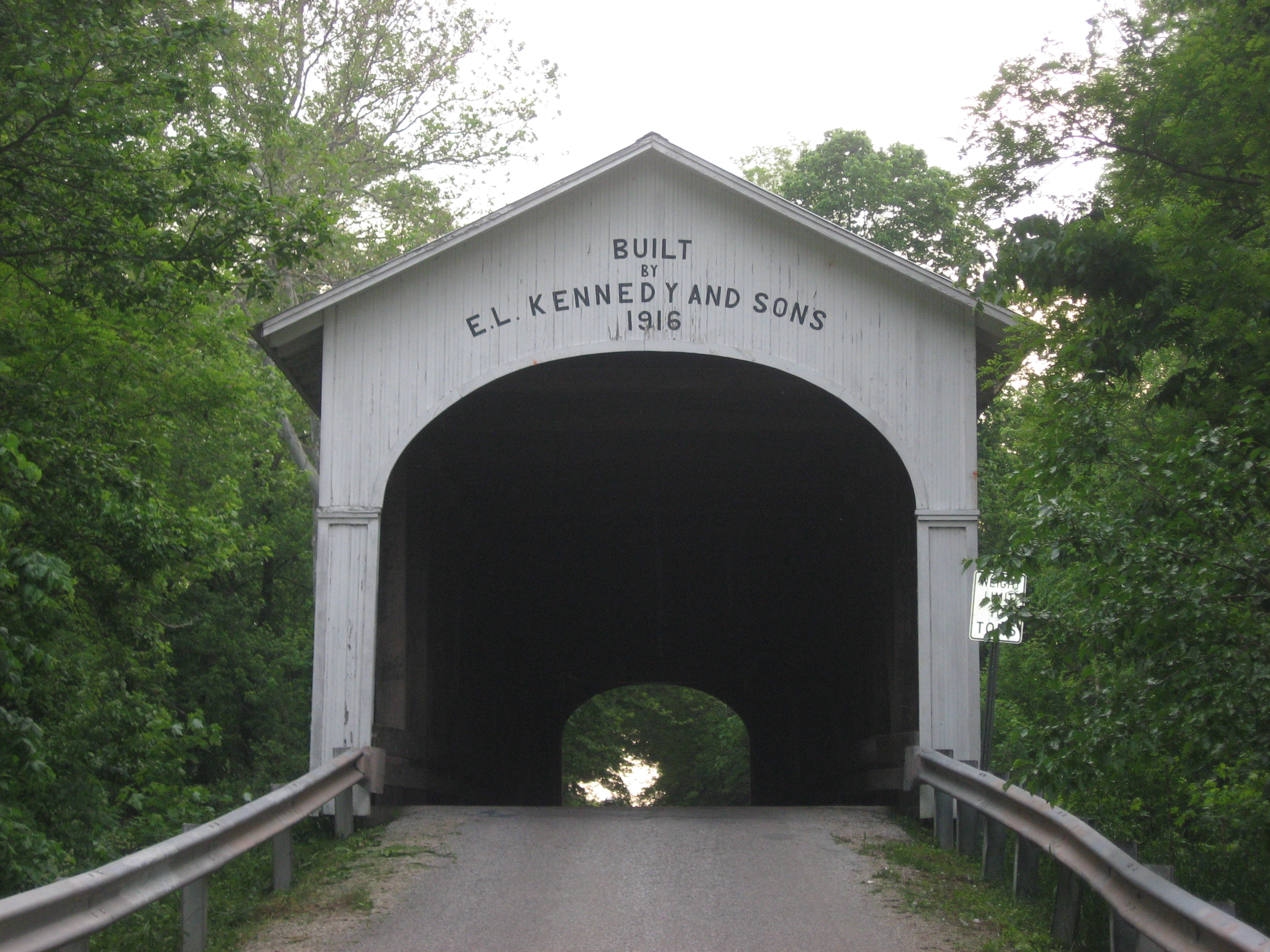
- The Norris Ford Covered Bridge, a historic site in the township

- Coordinates: 39°35′29″N 85°27′25″W
- Country: United States
- State: Indiana
- County: Rush

Government
  - Type: Indiana township

Area
  - Total: 43.94 sq mi (113.8 km^{2})
  - Land: 43.91 sq mi (113.7 km^{2})
  - Water: 0.03 sq mi (0.078 km^{2})
- Elevation: 965 ft (294 m)

Population (2020)
  - Total: 7,619
  - Density: 173.5/sq mi (66.99/km^{2})
- Time zone: UTC-5 (Eastern (EST))
  - Summer (DST): UTC-4 (EDT)
- Area code: 765
- FIPS code: 18-66456
- GNIS feature ID: 453816

Rushville Township is one of twelve townships in Rush County, Indiana, United States. As of the 2020 census, its population was 7,619 and it contained 3,505 housing units.

Historical population
Census	Pop.	Note	%±
1890	5,101		—
1900	6,027		18.2%
1910	6,282		4.2%
1920	6,782		8.0%
1930	7,023		3.6%
1940	7,338		4.5%
1950	8,090		10.2%
1960	9,131		12.9%
1970	8,894		−2.6%
1980	8,596		−3.4%
1990	7,996		−7.0%
2000	8,264		3.4%
2010	7,897		−4.4%
2020	7,619		−3.5%
Source: US Decennial Census

== History ==
Rushville Township was organized in 1823. The township was named for Benjamin F. Rush, signer of the Declaration of Independence.

The East Hill Cemetery, Archibald M. Kennedy House, and Norris Ford Covered Bridge are listed on the National Register of Historic Places.

== Geography ==
According to the 2010 census, the township has a total area of 43.94 square miles (113.8 km^{2}), of which 43.91 square miles (113.7 km^{2}) (or 99.93%) is land and 0.03 square miles (0.078 km^{2}) (or 0.07%) is water.

=== Cities and towns ===
- Rushville

=== Unincorporated towns ===
- Circleville at 39.6003249°N 85.4391369°W

(This list is based on USGS data and may include former settlements.)
