= Jackson Township, Rush County, Indiana =

Jackson Township
- Township
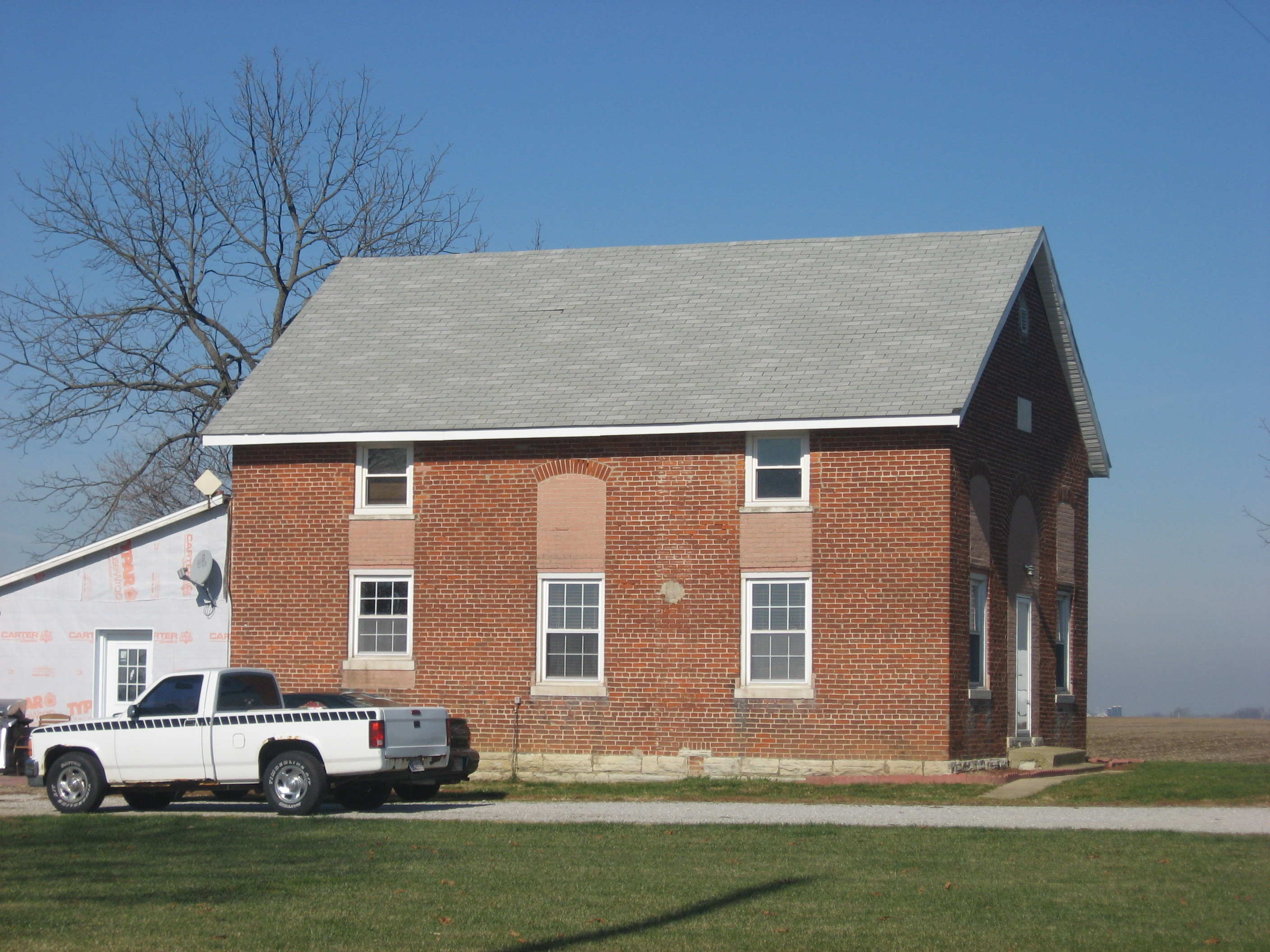
- A former school in the township

- Coordinates: 39°39′52″N 85°28′33″W
- Country: United States
- State: Indiana
- County: Rush

Government
  - Type: Indiana township

Area
  - Total: 22.6 sq mi (59 km^{2})
  - Land: 22.6 sq mi (59 km^{2})
  - Water: 0 sq mi (0 km^{2})
- Elevation: 980 ft (300 m)

Population (2020)
  - Total: 362
  - Density: 16.0/sq mi (6.18/km^{2})
- Time zone: UTC-5 (Eastern (EST))
  - Summer (DST): UTC-4 (EDT)
- Area code: 765
- FIPS code: 18-37386
- GNIS feature ID: 453465

Jackson Township is one of twelve townships in Rush County, Indiana. As of the 2020 census, its population was 362 and it contained 142 housing units.

Historical population
Census	Pop.	Note	%±
1890	789		—
1900	706		−10.5%
1910	659		−6.7%
1920	582		−11.7%
1930	593		1.9%
1940	513		−13.5%
1950	524		2.1%
1960	454		−13.4%
1970	466		2.6%
1980	435		−6.7%
1990	381		−12.4%
2000	415		8.9%
2010	366		−11.8%
2020	362		−1.1%
Source: US Decennial Census

== History ==
Jackson Township was organized in 1830.

The Smith Covered Bridge was listed on the National Register of Historic Places in 1983.

== Geography ==
According to the 2010 census, the township has a total area of 22.6 square miles (59 km^{2}), all land.

=== Unincorporated towns ===
- Henderson at 39.6694904°N 85.5202508°W
- Occident at 39.6911570°N 85.4783054°W

(This list is based on USGS data and may include former settlements.)
