= Richland, Rush County, Indiana =

Richland, Indiana
- Unincorporated community
- Location within Indiana Location within the United States
- Coordinates: 39°29′51″N 85°23′42″W
- Country: United States
- State: Indiana
- County: Rush
- Township: Richland
- Elevation: 1,024 ft (312 m)
- Time zone: UTC-5 (Eastern (EST))
  - Summer (DST): UTC-4 (EDT)
- Area code: 765
- GNIS feature ID: 441957

Richland is an unincorporated community in western Richland Township, Rush County, Indiana, United States. It lies along State Road 244, south of the city of Rushville, the county seat of Rush County.

== History ==
Richland was platted in 1854. The community took its name from Richland Township.

A post office was established at Richland in 1827, and remained in operation until it was discontinued in 1903.
