= Archibald M. Kennedy House =

Historic house in Indiana, United States

- U.S. National Register of Historic Places
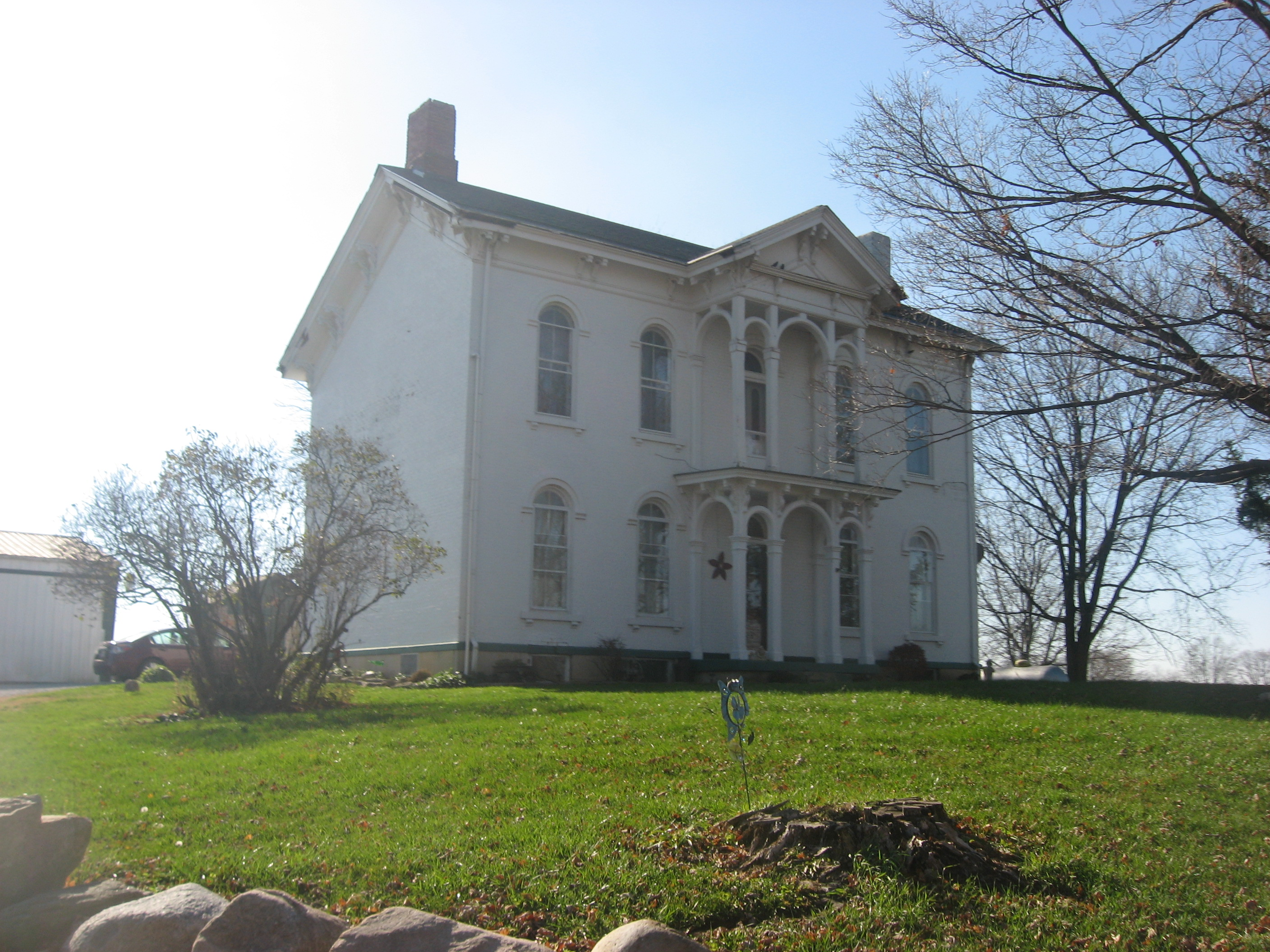
- Archibald M. Kennedy House, November 2012

- Location within Indiana Location within the United States
- Location: E. County Road 200N, northeast of Rushville in Rushville Township, Rush County, Indiana
- Coordinates: 39°38′17″N 85°24′3″W
- Area: less than one acre
- Built: 1864
- Built by: Kennedy, Archibald M.
- Architectural style: Italianate
- MPS: Kennedy, A. M., House and Covered Bridges of Rush County TR
- NRHP reference No.: 83000095
- Added to NRHP: February 2, 1983

Archibald M. Kennedy House is a historic home located near Rusvhille in Rushville Township, Rush County, Indiana. It was built in 1864 by Archibald M. Kennedy, and is a two-story, five-bay, painted brick Italianate style dwelling. It has a gable roof and pediment and 1 1/2-story rear wing. It features a two-story front porch supported by square columns and arched supports and arched openings.

It was listed on the U.S. National Register of Historic Places in 1983, as part of a multiple property submission covering six bridges built by the Kennedy family firm.
