= Manilla, Indiana =

- Census-designated place
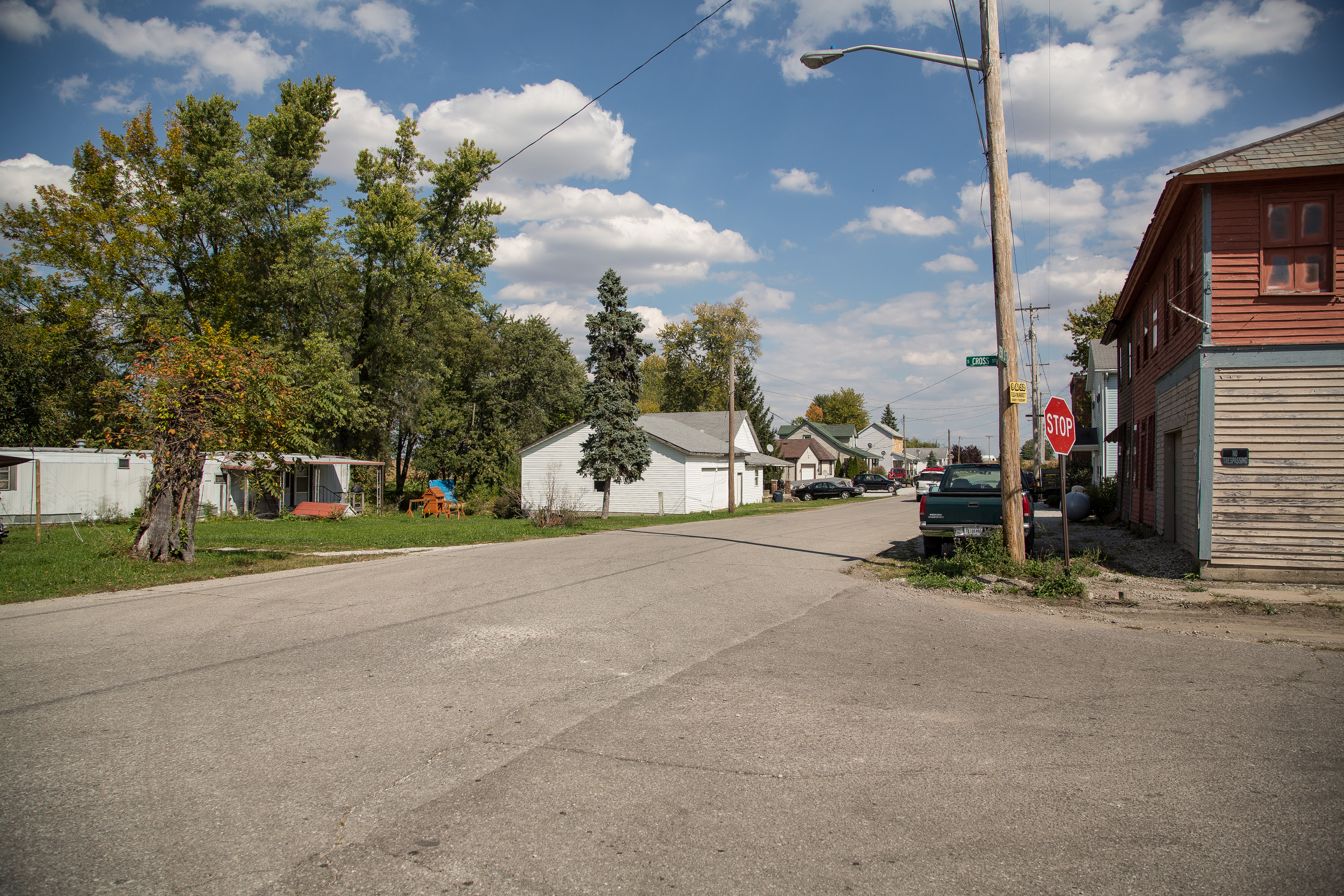

- Location of Manilla in Rush County, Indiana.
- Coordinates: 39°34′21″N 85°37′23″W
- Country: United States
- State: Indiana
- County: Rush
- Township: Walker

Area
  - Total: 0.22 sq mi (0.58 km^{2})
  - Land: 0.22 sq mi (0.58 km^{2})
  - Water: 0 sq mi (0.00 km^{2})
- Elevation: 889 ft (271 m)

Population (2020)
  - Total: 230
  - Density: 1,020/sq mi (393.8/km^{2})
- Time zone: UTC-5 (Eastern (EST))
  - Summer (DST): UTC-4 (EDT)
- ZIP code: 46150
- Area code: 765
- FIPS code: 18-46422
- GNIS feature ID: 2629874

Manilla is an unincorporated census-designated place in Walker Township, Rush County, Indiana. As of the 2020 census, Manilla had a population of 230.

== History ==
Manilla was originally called Wilmington, and under the latter name was laid out in 1836. The name Manilla most likely is derived from Manila, in the Philippines.

The Manilla post office has been in operation since 1840.

== Demographics ==
Historical population
Census	Pop.	Note	%±
2020	230		—
U.S. Decennial Census
