= Orange, Indiana =

- Unincorporated community
- Location within Indiana Location within the United States
- Coordinates: 39°35′03″N 85°17′57″W
- Country: United States
- State: Indiana
- County: Fayette
- Township: Orange
- Elevation: 1,102 ft (336 m)
- ZIP code: 46133
- FIPS code: 18-56718
- GNIS feature ID: 440676

Orange is an unincorporated community in Orange Township, Fayette County, Indiana, United States.

== History ==
Orange was platted in 1824. It took its name from Orange Township. A post office was established at Orange in 1826, and remained in operation until it was discontinued in 1908.
