= Buena Vista, Franklin County, Indiana =

Buena Vista, Indiana
- Unincorporated community
- Location within Indiana Location within the United States
- Coordinates: 39°26′20″N 85°16′21″W
- Country: United States
- State: Indiana
- County: Franklin
- Township: Posey
- Elevation: 997 ft (304 m)
- ZIP code: 47024
- FIPS code: 18-08938
- GNIS feature ID: 431764

Buena Vista is an unincorporated community in Posey Township, Franklin County, Indiana.

== History ==
Buena Vista was laid out in 1848 by William Pruet, a landowner. Its name commemorates the Battle of Buena Vista.
