= Circleville, Indiana =

Unincorporated community in Indiana

- Unincorporated community
- Location within Indiana Location within the United States
- Coordinates: 39°36′01″N 85°26′21″W
- Country: United States
- State: Indiana
- County: Rush
- Township: Rushville
- Elevation: 984 ft (300 m)
- Time zone: UTC-5 (Eastern (EST))
  - Summer (DST): UTC-4 (EDT)
- ZIP code: 46173
- Area code: 765
- GNIS feature ID: 432531

Circleville is an unincorporated community in Rushville Township, Rush County, in the U.S. state of Indiana.
