= Richland Township, Rush County, Indiana =

Richland Township
- Township
- Coordinates: 39°29′23″N 85°21′46″W
- Country: United States
- State: Indiana
- County: Rush

Government
  - Type: Indiana township

Area
  - Total: 28.53 sq mi (73.9 km^{2})
  - Land: 28.52 sq mi (73.9 km^{2})
  - Water: 0.01 sq mi (0.026 km^{2})
- Elevation: 1,053 ft (321 m)

Population (2020)
  - Total: 305
  - Density: 10.7/sq mi (4.13/km^{2})
- Time zone: UTC-5 (Eastern (EST))
  - Summer (DST): UTC-4 (EDT)
- Area code: 765
- FIPS code: 18-64188
- GNIS feature ID: 453799

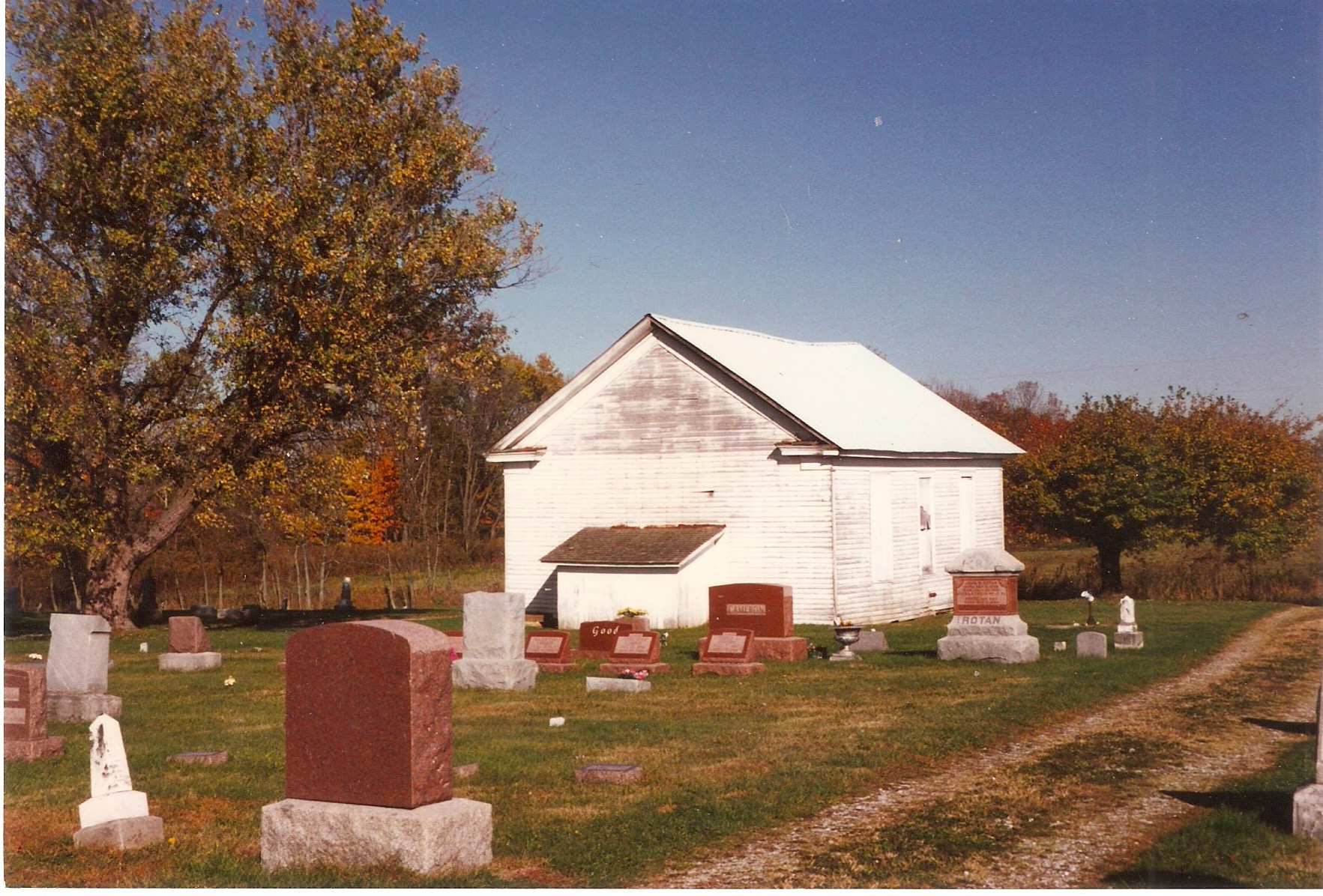
Hopewell Cemetery is located on 700 East in Richland Township, Rush County, Indiana. This photo was snapped in 1996 before the Hopewell Church was demolished.

Richland Township is one of twelve townships in Rush County, Indiana. As of the 2020 census, its population was 305 and it contained 135 housing units.

Richland Township most likely was so named on account of their fertile soil.

Historical population
Census	Pop.	Note	%±
1890	862		—
1900	767		−11.0%
1910	718		−6.4%
1920	695		−3.2%
1930	667		−4.0%
1940	572		−14.2%
1950	626		9.4%
1960	567		−9.4%
1970	516		−9.0%
1980	460		−10.9%
1990	397		−13.7%
2000	371		−6.5%
2010	337		−9.2%
2020	305		−9.5%
Source: US Decennial Census

== Geography ==
According to the 2010 census, the township has a total area of 28.53 square miles (73.9 km^{2}), of which 28.52 square miles (73.9 km^{2}) (or 99.96%) is land and 0.01 square miles (0.026 km^{2}) (or 0.04%) is water.

=== Unincorporated towns ===
- Richland at 39.4975485°N 85.3949681°W

(This list is based on USGS data and may include former settlements.)
