= Fairview, Rush County, Indiana =

Fairview
- Unincorporated community
- Location within Indiana Location within the United States
- Coordinates: 39°41′08″N 85°18′04″W
- Country: United States
- State: Indiana
- County: Rush, Fayette
- Township: Union, Fairview
- Elevation: 1,056 ft (322 m)
- Time zone: UTC-5 (Eastern (EST))
  - Summer (DST): UTC-4 (EDT)
- ZIP code: 46127
- Area code: 765
- GNIS feature ID: 434309

Fairview is an unincorporated community in Rush and Fayette counties, in the U.S. state of Indiana.

== History ==
Fairview was established as a town in about 1828. An old variant name of the community was called Grove.

The Rush County side of Fairview contained a post office from 1830 until 1835. The post office was removed to the Fayette County side in 1835, and was discontinued the following year, in 1836.
