= Rush County, Indiana =

County in Indiana, United States

- County
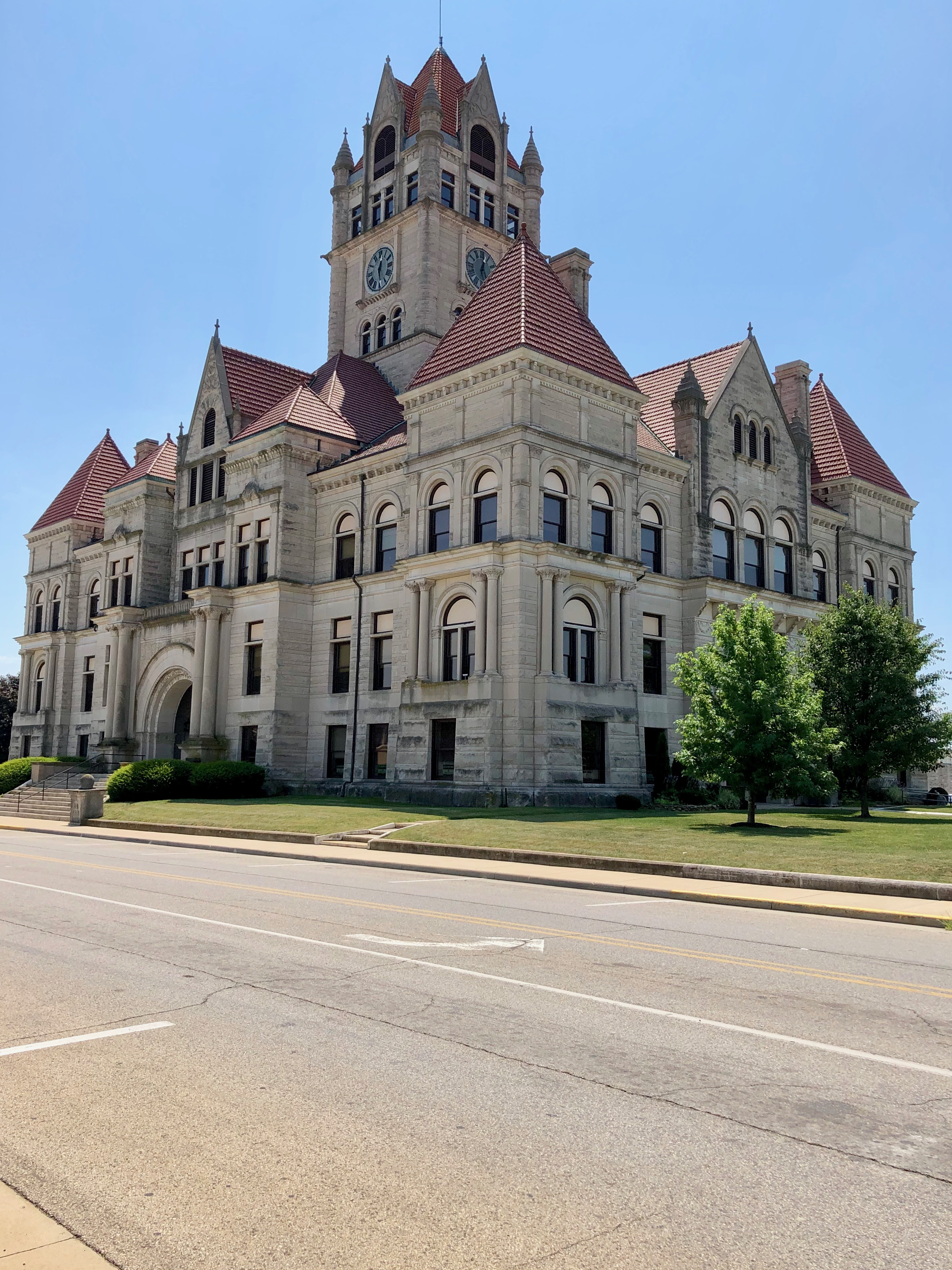
- The Rush County Courthouse in Rushville

- Location within the U.S. state of Indiana
- Coordinates: 39°37′N 85°28′W
- Country: United States
- State: Indiana
- Founded: 1822
- Named for: Benjamin Rush
- Seat: Rushville
- Largest city: Rushville

Area
  - Total: 408.46 sq mi (1,057.9 km^{2})
  - Land: 408.12 sq mi (1,057.0 km^{2})
  - Water: 0.34 sq mi (0.88 km^{2}) 0.08%

Population (2020)
  - Total: 16,752
  - Estimate (2025): 16,767 ▲
  - Density: 41.047/sq mi (15.848/km^{2})
- Time zone: UTC−5 (Eastern)
  - Summer (DST): UTC−4 (EDT)
- Congressional district: 6th
- Website: rushcounty.in.gov
- Indiana county number 70

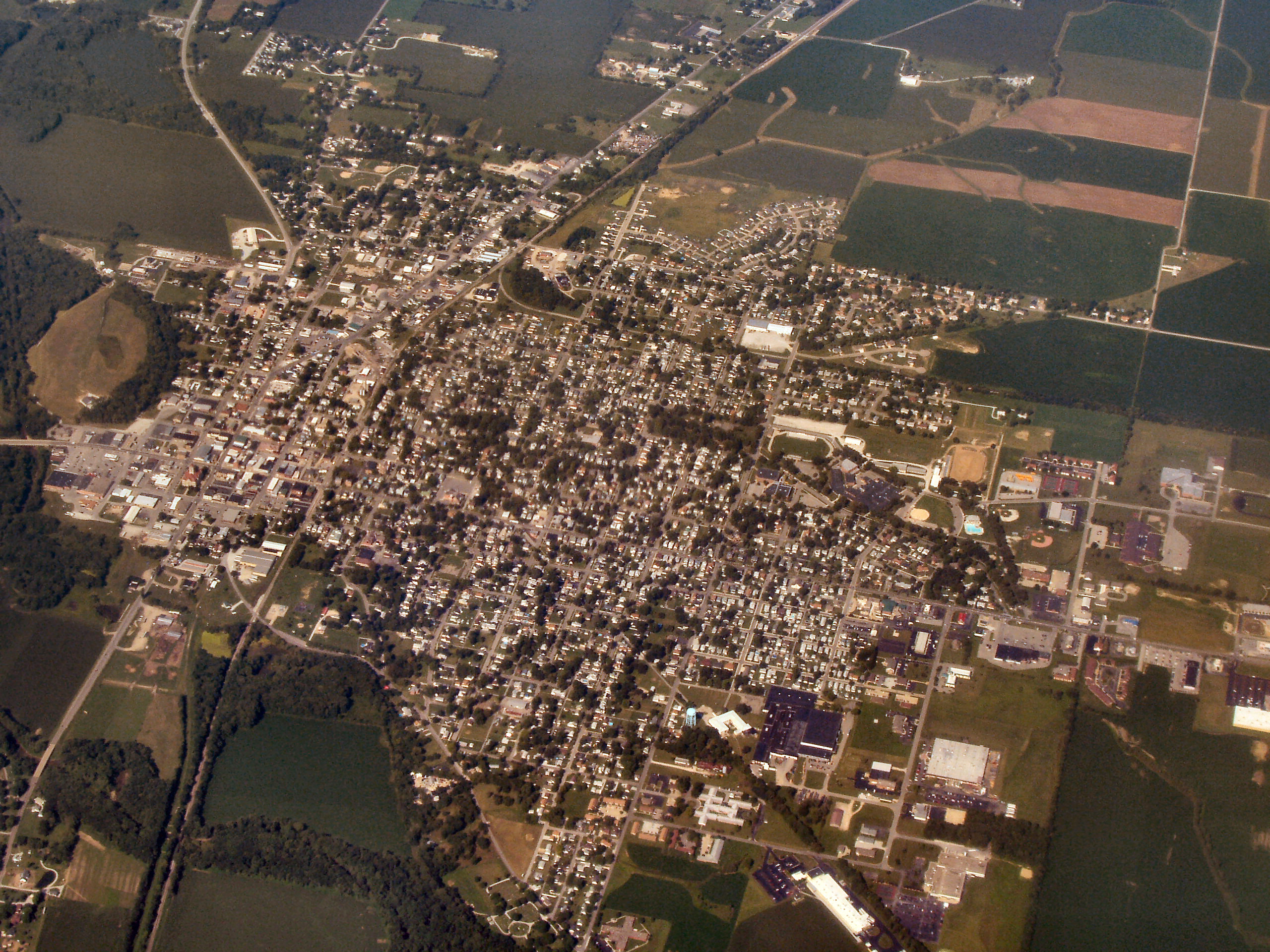
Aerial view of Rushville

Rush County is a county in the U.S. state of Indiana. In the 2020 United States census, the population was 16,752. The county seat (and only city) is Rushville.

== History ==
When the Indiana Territory was granted statehood (December 20, 1816), there were no settlers on the lands of the future Rush County. However, this changed quickly, and by 1821 the newly founded settlements were desirous of being organized into a county unit. Accordingly, the state legislature passed an act dated December 31, 1821, which authorized Rush County, effective April 1, and further authorized the first commissioners (pro tem) to begin organizing the county's governing structure on June 3, 1822. The act also authorized six townships to cover the county; subsequent growth through the years has caused the number of townships to double. It was named for Dr. Benjamin Rush, one of the signers of the 1776 Declaration of Independence. That same summer (1822) the future town (and county seat) of Rushville was platted and laid out.

== Geography ==
In the 1820s the low rolling hills of Rush County were generously covered with trees, usually walnut and sugar maples. By 1879 Rush County was the state's largest producer of maple syrup. However, logging and clearing for agriculture have completely removed the trees, except for stands in drainages, and the available land is completely devoted to agriculture or urban development. The Big Blue River drains the upper part of the county, flowing to the southwest. The Little Blue River flows southwest to drain the central part of the county, and Flatrock River flows south-southwest through the lower central part of the county. The terrain's highest point (1,135 feet/346 m ASL) is an isolated rise at the county's east boundary, 1.4 miles (2.3 km) SSW of Glenwood. According to the 2010 census, the county has a total area of 408.46 square miles (1,057.9 km^{2}), of which 408.12 square miles (1,057.0 km^{2}) (or 99.92%) is land and 0.34 square miles (0.88 km^{2}) (or 0.08%) is water.

=== Adjacent counties ===
- Henry County - north
- Fayette County - east
- Franklin County - southeast
- Decatur County - south
- Shelby County - west
- Hancock County - northwest

=== Cities and towns ===
- Carthage
- Glenwood
- Rushville (city/county seat)

=== Census-designated places ===
- Arlington
- Manilla
- Milroy

=== Unincorporated towns ===
- Charlottesville
- Circleville
- Fairview
- Falmouth
- Gings
- Gowdy
- Henderson
- Homer
- Mauzy
- Mays
- Moscow
- New Salem
- Occident
- Raleigh
- Richland
- Sexton
- Williamstown

=== Townships ===
- Anderson
- Center
- Jackson
- Noble
- Orange
- Posey
- Richland
- Ripley
- Rushville
- Union
- Walker
- Washington

=== Major highways ===
- / Interstate 74/U.S. Route 421**
- U.S. Route 52
- Indiana State Road 3
- Indiana State Road 44
- Indiana State Road 140
- Indiana State Road 244

== Climate and weather ==
Rushville, Indiana

Climate chart (precipitation, max. and min. temperature)
J	F	M	A	M	J	J	A	S	O	N	D
2.6 34 17	2.6 39 21	3.2 50 30	4.2 62 39	5.1 73 50	4.3 81 60	4.4 84 63	3.6 83 61	2.9 77 53	2.9 65 42	3.6 51 33	3.1 39 24
- █ Average max. and min. temperatures in °F
- █ Precipitation totals in inches
- Source: The Weather Channel
Metric conversion
J	F	M	A	M	J	J	A	S	O	N	D
67 1 −8	65 4 −6	81 10 −1	107 17 4	129 23 10	110 27 16	111 29 17	91 28 16	73 25 12	72 18 6	91 11 1	78 4 −4
- █ Average max. and min. temperatures in °C
- █ Precipitation totals in mm

In recent years, average temperatures in Rushville have ranged from a low of 17 °F (−8 °C) in January to a high of 84 °F (29 °C) in July, although a record low of −28 °F (−33 °C) was recorded in January 1994 and a record high of 108 °F (42 °C) was recorded in July 1901. Average monthly precipitation ranged from 2.55 inches (65 mm) in February to 5.06 inches (129 mm) in May.

== Government ==
The county government is a constitutional body, and is granted specific powers by the Constitution of Indiana, and by the Indiana Code.

County Council: The legislative branch of the county government; controls spending and revenue collection in the county. Representatives are elected to four-year terms from county districts. They set salaries, the annual budget, and special spending. The council has limited authority to impose local taxes, in the form of an income and property tax that is subject to state level approval, excise taxes, and service taxes.

Board of Commissioners: The executive body of the county; commissioners are elected county-wide to staggered four-year terms. One commissioner serves as president. The commissioners execute acts legislated by the council, collect revenue, and manage the county government.

County Officials: The county has other elected offices, including sheriff, coroner, auditor, treasurer, recorder, surveyor and circuit court clerk. These officers are elected to four-year terms. Members elected to county government positions are required to declare party affiliations and to be residents of the county.

United States presidential election results for Rush County, Indiana
Year	Republican		Democratic		Third party(ies)	
Year	No.	%	No.	%	No.	%
1888	2,713	52.46%	2,292	44.32%	167	3.23%
1892	2,566	51.26%	2,210	44.15%	230	4.59%
1896	2,891	51.88%	2,602	46.69%	80	1.44%
1900	2,913	52.21%	2,503	44.86%	163	2.92%
1904	3,082	54.12%	2,363	41.49%	250	4.39%
1908	3,102	52.96%	2,544	43.44%	211	3.60%
1912	1,931	34.57%	2,312	41.39%	1,343	24.04%
1916	2,950	51.22%	2,569	44.60%	241	4.18%
1920	6,113	56.59%	4,513	41.78%	177	1.64%
1924	5,958	62.58%	3,415	35.87%	148	1.55%
1928	6,640	68.38%	2,996	30.85%	75	0.77%
1932	5,094	49.50%	5,056	49.14%	140	1.36%
1936	5,457	47.45%	5,999	52.17%	44	0.38%
1940	6,486	60.02%	4,282	39.62%	39	0.36%
1944	5,853	59.60%	3,891	39.62%	77	0.78%
1948	5,362	57.53%	3,814	40.92%	145	1.56%
1952	6,918	66.82%	3,348	32.34%	87	0.84%
1956	6,202	64.69%	3,346	34.90%	39	0.41%
1960	6,215	63.54%	3,516	35.94%	51	0.52%
1964	4,507	49.94%	4,450	49.31%	68	0.75%
1968	5,004	59.42%	2,636	31.30%	781	9.27%
1972	5,965	76.95%	1,764	22.76%	23	0.30%
1976	4,723	60.32%	3,052	38.98%	55	0.70%
1980	4,829	64.29%	2,388	31.79%	294	3.91%
1984	5,429	69.86%	2,307	29.69%	35	0.45%
1988	5,112	67.41%	2,451	32.32%	20	0.26%
1992	3,873	48.36%	2,168	27.07%	1,967	24.56%
1996	3,827	51.52%	2,578	34.71%	1,023	13.77%
2000	4,749	65.20%	2,370	32.54%	165	2.27%
2004	5,363	72.27%	2,000	26.95%	58	0.78%
2008	4,271	55.98%	3,229	42.33%	129	1.69%
2012	4,633	65.94%	2,221	31.61%	172	2.45%
2016	5,292	72.83%	1,525	20.99%	449	6.18%
2020	6,035	76.00%	1,754	22.09%	152	1.91%
2024	5,812	75.91%	1,675	21.88%	169	2.21%

== Demographics ==
Historical population
Census	Pop.	Note	%±
1830	9,707		—
1840	16,456		69.5%
1850	16,445		−0.1%
1860	16,193		−1.5%
1870	17,626		8.8%
1880	19,238		9.1%
1890	19,034		−1.1%
1900	20,148		5.9%
1910	19,349		−4.0%
1920	19,241		−0.6%
1930	19,412		0.9%
1940	18,927		−2.5%
1950	19,799		4.6%
1960	20,393		3.0%
1970	20,352		−0.2%
1980	19,604		−3.7%
1990	18,129		−7.5%
2000	18,261		0.7%
2010	17,392		−4.8%
2020	16,752		−3.7%
2025 (est.)	16,767	▲	0.1%
US Decennial Census; 1790-1960 1900-1990; 1990-2000 2010

=== Racial and ethnic composition ===
Rush County, Indiana – Racial and ethnic composition Note: the US Census treats Hispanic/Latino as an ethnic category. This table excludes Latinos from the racial categories and assigns them to a separate category. Hispanics/Latinos may be of any race.
Race / Ethnicity (NH = Non-Hispanic)	Pop 1980	Pop 1990	Pop 2000	Pop 2010	Pop 2020	% 1980	% 1990	% 2000	% 2010	% 2020
White alone (NH)	19,325	17,855	17,794	16,839	15,876	98.58%	98.49%	97.44%	96.82%	94.77%
Black or African American alone (NH)	164	137	108	129	90	0.84%	0.76%	0.59%	0.74%	0.54%
Native American or Alaska Native alone (NH)	24	14	29	32	19	0.12%	0.08%	0.16%	0.18%	0.11%
Asian alone (NH)	15	58	84	57	54	0.08%	0.32%	0.46%	0.33%	0.32%
Native Hawaiian or Pacific Islander alone (NH)	x	x	4	3	3	x	x	0.02%	0.02%	0.02%
Other race alone (NH)	11	4	9	20	36	0.06%	0.02%	0.05%	0.11%	0.21%
Mixed race or Multiracial (NH)	x	x	141	122	422	x	x	0.77%	0.70%	2.52%
Hispanic or Latino (any race)	65	61	92	190	252	0.33%	0.34%	0.50%	1.09%	1.50%
Total	19,604	18,129	18,261	17,392	16,752	100.00%	100.00%	100.00%	100.00%	100.00%

=== 2020 census ===
As of the 2020 census, the county had a population of 16,752. The median age was 41.9 years. 23.0% of residents were under the age of 18 and 18.6% of residents were 65 years of age or older. For every 100 females there were 97.3 males, and for every 100 females age 18 and over there were 95.7 males age 18 and over.

The racial makeup of the county was 95.2% White, 0.6% Black or African American, 0.1% American Indian and Alaska Native, 0.3% Asian, <0.1% Native Hawaiian and Pacific Islander, 0.7% from some other race, and 3.1% from two or more races. Hispanic or Latino residents of any race comprised 1.5% of the population.

38.6% of residents lived in urban areas, while 61.4% lived in rural areas.

There were 6,712 households in the county, of which 29.7% had children under the age of 18 living in them. Of all households, 51.3% were married-couple households, 17.6% were households with a male householder and no spouse or partner present, and 23.3% were households with a female householder and no spouse or partner present. About 26.4% of all households were made up of individuals and 12.1% had someone living alone who was 65 years of age or older.

There were 7,352 housing units, of which 8.7% were vacant. Among occupied housing units, 72.7% were owner-occupied and 27.3% were renter-occupied. The homeowner vacancy rate was 1.9% and the rental vacancy rate was 8.0%.

=== 2010 census ===
As of the 2010 United States census, there were 17,392 people, 6,767 households, and 4,803 families in the county. The population density was 42.6 inhabitants per square mile (16.4/km^{2}). There were 7,508 housing units at an average density of 18.4 per square mile (7.1/km^{2}). The racial makeup of the county was 97.4% white, 0.8% black or African American, 0.3% Asian, 0.2% American Indian, 0.5% from other races, and 0.8% from two or more races. Those of Hispanic or Latino origin made up 1.1% of the population. In terms of ancestry, 23.4% were German, 16.8% were American, 12.0% were Irish, and 11.9% were English.

Of the 6,767 households, 32.8% had children under the age of 18 living with them, 54.9% were married couples living together, 10.9% had a female householder with no husband present, 29.0% were non-families, and 24.5% of all households were made up of individuals. The average household size was 2.54 and the average family size was 2.99. The median age was 40.6 years.

The median income for a household in the county was $47,697 and the median income for a family was $52,874. Males had a median income of $41,581 versus $30,035 for females. The per capita income for the county was $21,215. About 10.3% of families and 12.8% of the population were below the poverty line, including 17.4% of those under age 18 and 9.3% of those age 65 or over.

== See also ==
- National Register of Historic Places listings in Rush County, Indiana
- Edward E. Moore, Indiana state senator and Los Angeles City Council member
