= Audubon Colorado Council =

US coalition of non-profit organizations

- Type: Non-profit organization
- Purpose: Conservation
- Headquarters: Colorado, U.S.
- Website: auduboncoloradocouncil.com

Audubon Colorado Council (ACC) in an organization that coordinates efforts of all Colorado Audubon chapters in keeping with goals of the Audubon Rockies and National Audubon Society. The mission of the National Audubon Society's (NAS) is "to conserve and restore natural ecosystems, focusing on birds, other wildlife, and their habitats for the benefit of humanity and the earth's biological diversity." Representatives of Colorado Audubon chapters meet throughout the year to work on conservation, public policy, and water talk force committees.

There are 11 chapters of the Audubon Colorado Council, including the Black Canyon Audubon Society, Audubon Society of Greater Denver and Boulder County, Weminuche, Fort Collins, Arkansas Valley, and Aiken (Colorado Springs).

The council meets with legislators, Colorado Parks and Wildlife, and the media, such as High Country News to evaluate proposals and lobby for laws.
