= Washington Township, Rush County, Indiana =

Washington Township
- Township
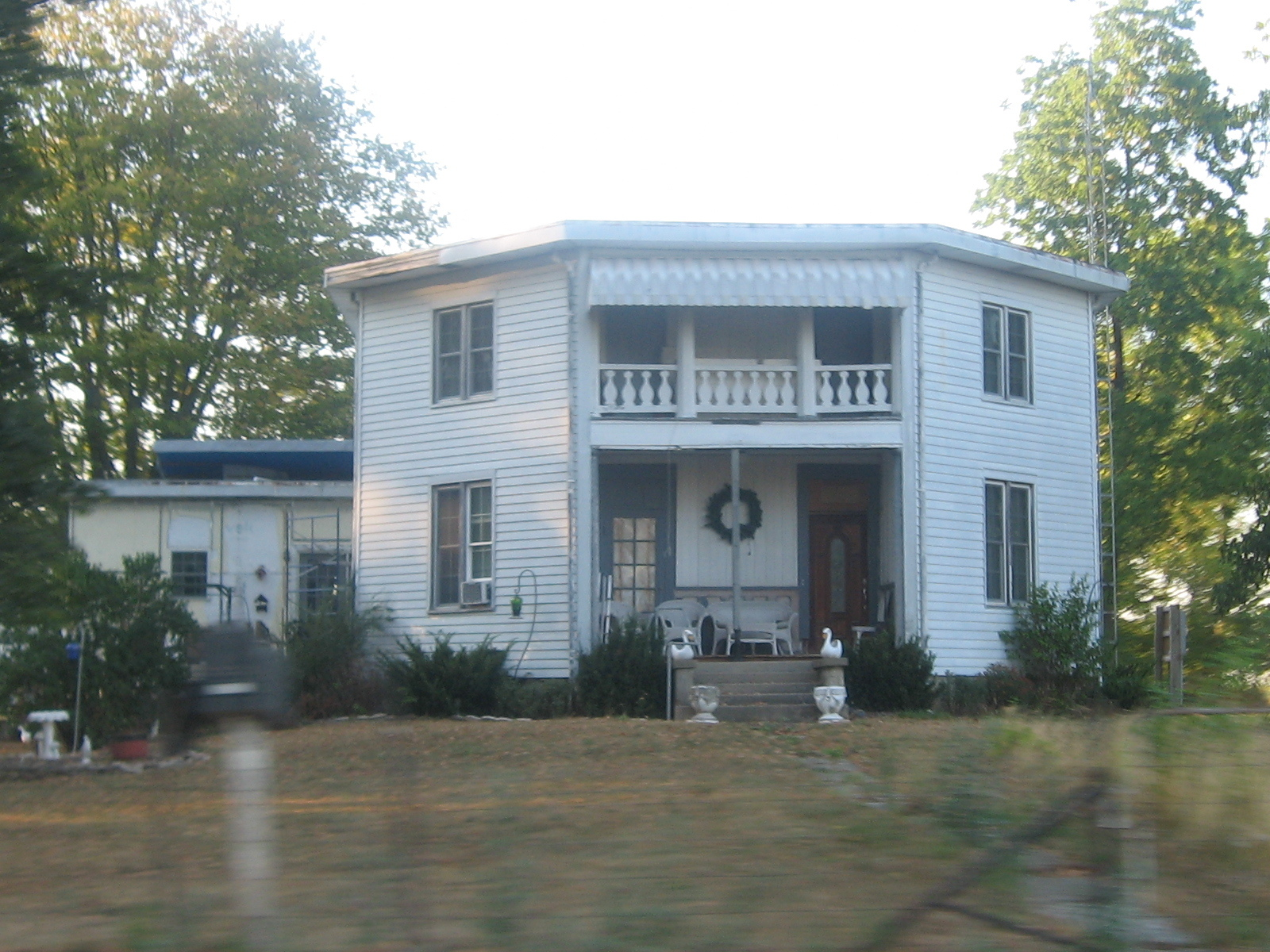
- The Hall-Crull Octagonal House, a historic site in the township

- Coordinates: 39°44′56″N 85°21′10″W
- Country: United States
- State: Indiana
- County: Rush

Government
  - Type: Indiana township

Area
  - Total: 34.26 sq mi (88.7 km^{2})
  - Land: 34.26 sq mi (88.7 km^{2})
  - Water: 0 sq mi (0 km^{2})
- Elevation: 1,014 ft (309 m)

Population (2020)
  - Total: 414
  - Density: 12.1/sq mi (4.67/km^{2})
- Time zone: UTC-5 (Eastern (EST))
  - Summer (DST): UTC-4 (EDT)
- Area code: 765
- FIPS code: 18-81026
- GNIS feature ID: 454018

Washington Township is one of twelve townships in Rush County, Indiana. As of the 2020 census, its population was 414 and it contained 195 housing units.

Historical population
Census	Pop.	Note	%±
1890	1,033		—
1900	1,031		−0.2%
1910	888		−13.9%
1920	925		4.2%
1930	883		−4.5%
1940	799		−9.5%
1950	755		−5.5%
1960	797		5.6%
1970	718		−9.9%
1980	568		−20.9%
1990	531		−6.5%
2000	471		−11.3%
2010	475		0.8%
2020	414		−12.8%
Source: US Decennial Census

== History ==
The Hall-Crull Octagonal House was listed on the National Register of Historic Places in 1984.

== Geography ==
According to the 2010 census, the township has a total area of 34.26 square miles (88.7 km^{2}), all land.

=== Unincorporated towns ===
- Raleigh at 39.7439346°N 85.3638580°W

(This list is based on USGS data and may include former settlements.)
