= Indiana State Road 244 =

State highway in Indiana, United States

State Road 244
- SR 244 highlighted in red

Route information
- Maintained by INDOT
- Length: 22.294 mi (35.879 km)
- Existed: 1932–present

Major junctions
- West end: Michigan Road near Shelbyville
- I-74 / US 421 near Shelbyville
- East end: US 52 at Andersonville

Location
- Country: United States
- State: Indiana
- Counties: Franklin, Rush, Shelby

Highway system
- Indiana State Highway System; Interstate; US; State; Scenic
← SR 243	→ SR 245

State Road 244 (SR 244) is a State Road in the eastern section of the state of Indiana. Running for about 22.3 miles (35.9 km) in a general east–west direction, connecting rural portions of Shelby, Rush, and Franklin counties. SR 244 was originally introduced in 1932 routed between SR 29 and U.S. Route 52. The road was paved in the late 1960s

== Route description ==
SR 244 begins at an intersection with Michigan Road, formerly U.S. Route 421 (US 421), southeast of Shelbyville. The road heads east having an interchange with Interstate 74/US 421 at Exit 119 in Shelby County. It proceeds east entering Rush County and passing through an intersection with SR 3. East of SR 3, SR 244 enters the census-designated place of Milroy, Indiana. While in Milroy SR 244 is also known as Main Street. The highway continues east passing through rural Rush County, before entering Franklin County. Soon after entering Franklin County SR 244 enters the community of Andersonville. On the east side of Andersonville SR 244 ends at a three-way intersection with US 52.

In 2015 the highest traffic count is at the just east of SR 3, where 2,757 vehicles travel the highway on average each day. The lowest traffic count is east of Milroy, where 782 vehicles travel the highway on average each day.

== History ==
SR 244 was first designated in 1931. The original routing started at SR 29, now Michigan Road, and ran east through rural Shelby and Rush Counties to US 52 much as it does today. The highway had an interchange with I-74 added between 1960 and 1961. SR 244 served as a temporary eastern end of I-74 between 1960 and 1962. The roadway was paved in two segment the first of which was the segment in Rush County paved between 1966 and 1967. The rest of the road was paved between 1969 and 1970.

== Major intersections ==
County	Location	mi	km	Destinations	Notes
Shelby	Liberty Township	0.000	0.000	Michigan Road – Waldron	Old US 421; western terminus of SR 244
Shelby	Liberty Township	0.298– 0.410	0.480– 0.660	I-74 / US 421 – Indianapolis, Cincinnati	exit 119 on I-74
Rush	Milroy	12.016	19.338	SR 3 – Greensburg, Rushville	
Franklin	Andersonville	22.294	35.879	US 52 – Brookville, Rushville	Eastern terminus of SR 244
1.000 mi = 1.609 km; 1.000 km = 0.621 mi
