= Union Township, Rush County, Indiana =

Union Township
- Township
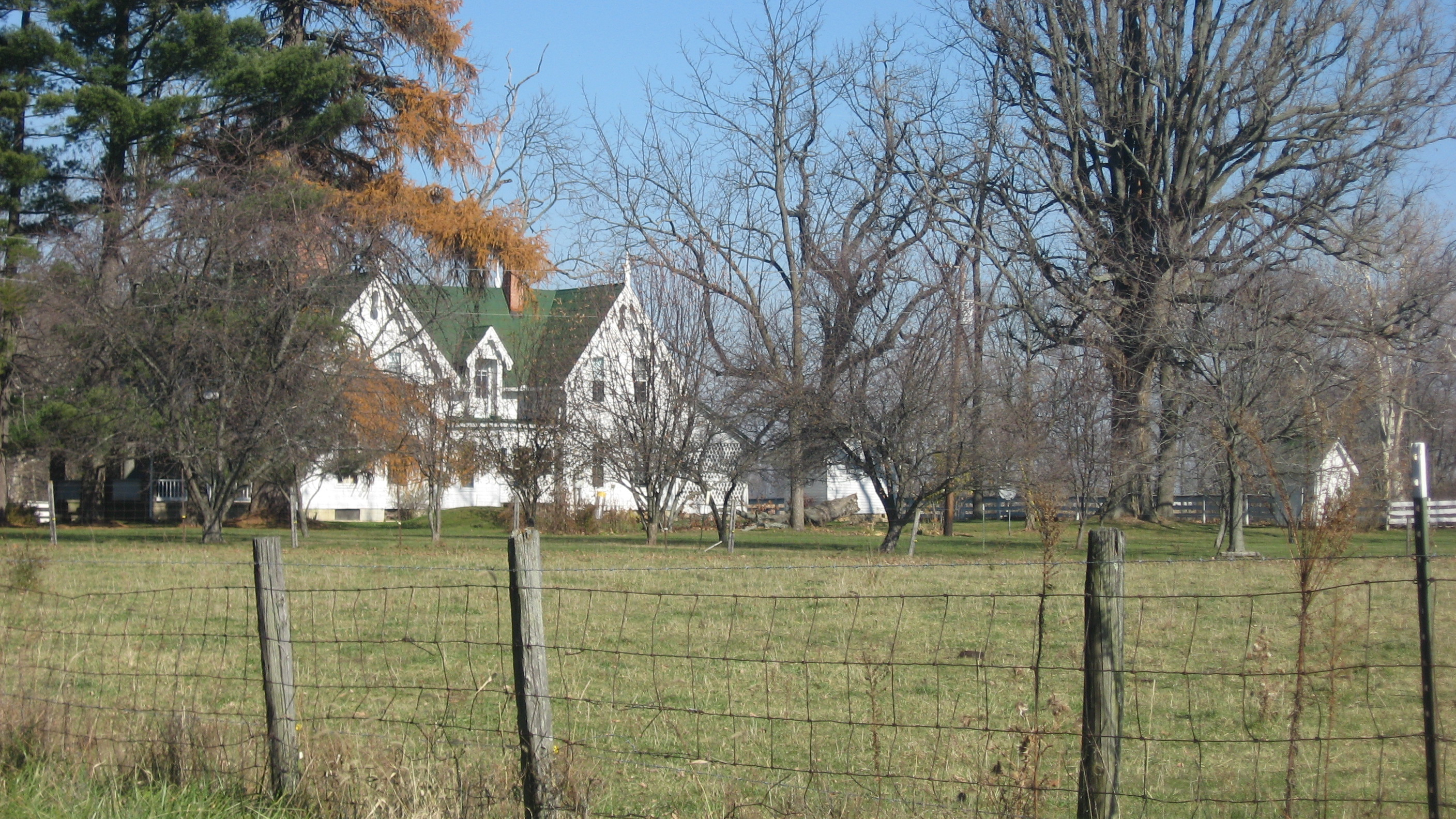
- Buildings at the Arnold Farm, a historic site in the township

- Coordinates: 39°39′43″N 85°21′52″W
- Country: United States
- State: Indiana
- County: Rush

Government
  - Type: Indiana township

Area
  - Total: 35.5 sq mi (92 km^{2})
  - Land: 35.5 sq mi (92 km^{2})
  - Water: 0 sq mi (0 km^{2})
- Elevation: 1,024 ft (312 m)

Population (2020)
  - Total: 734
  - Density: 20.7/sq mi (7.98/km^{2})
- Time zone: UTC-5 (Eastern (EST))
  - Summer (DST): UTC-4 (EDT)
- Area code: 765
- FIPS code: 18-77606
- GNIS feature ID: 453932

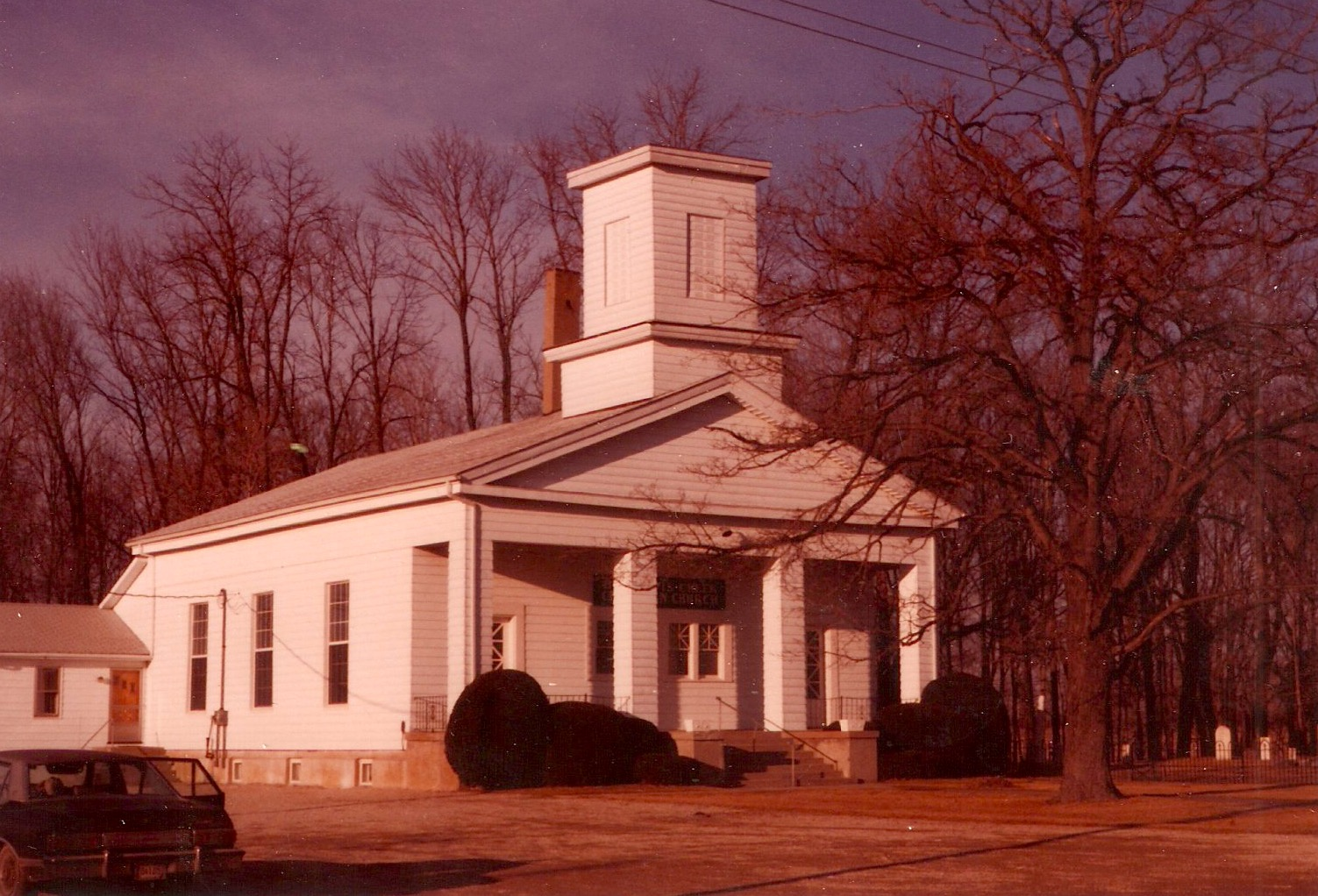
Historic Ben Davis Creek Christian Church located at 6016 East 250 North in Union Township, Rush County, Indiana. Photo snapped in 1985

Union Township is one of twelve townships in Rush County, Indiana. As of the 2020 census, its population was 734 and it contained 324 housing units.

Historical population
Census	Pop.	Note	%±
1890	1,299		—
1900	1,315		1.2%
1910	1,202		−8.6%
1920	1,158		−3.7%
1930	1,170		1.0%
1940	1,013		−13.4%
1950	1,096		8.2%
1960	1,026		−6.4%
1970	1,030		0.4%
1980	920		−10.7%
1990	918		−0.2%
2000	873		−4.9%
2010	765		−12.4%
2020	734		−4.1%
Source: US Decennial Census

== History ==
The Dr. John Arnold Farm was listed on the National Register of Historic Places in 1989.

== Geography ==
According to the 2010 census, the township has a total area of 35.5 square miles (92 km^{2}), all land.

=== Cities and towns ===
- Glenwood

=== Unincorporated towns ===
- Fairview at 39.6856023°N 85.3010780°W
- Falmouth at 39.7008798°N 85.3010781°W
- Gings at 39.6708799°N 85.3708021°W

(This list is based on USGS data and may include former settlements.)

=== Settlements ===
- Mauzy at 39.6239361°N 85.3383008°W
  - An old variant name of the community was Griffin Station. William Mauzy worked as a teacher near the old Griffin Station. A post office was established at Mauzy in 1884, and remained in operation until it was discontinued in 1905.
