= Noble Township, Rush County, Indiana =

Noble Township
- Township
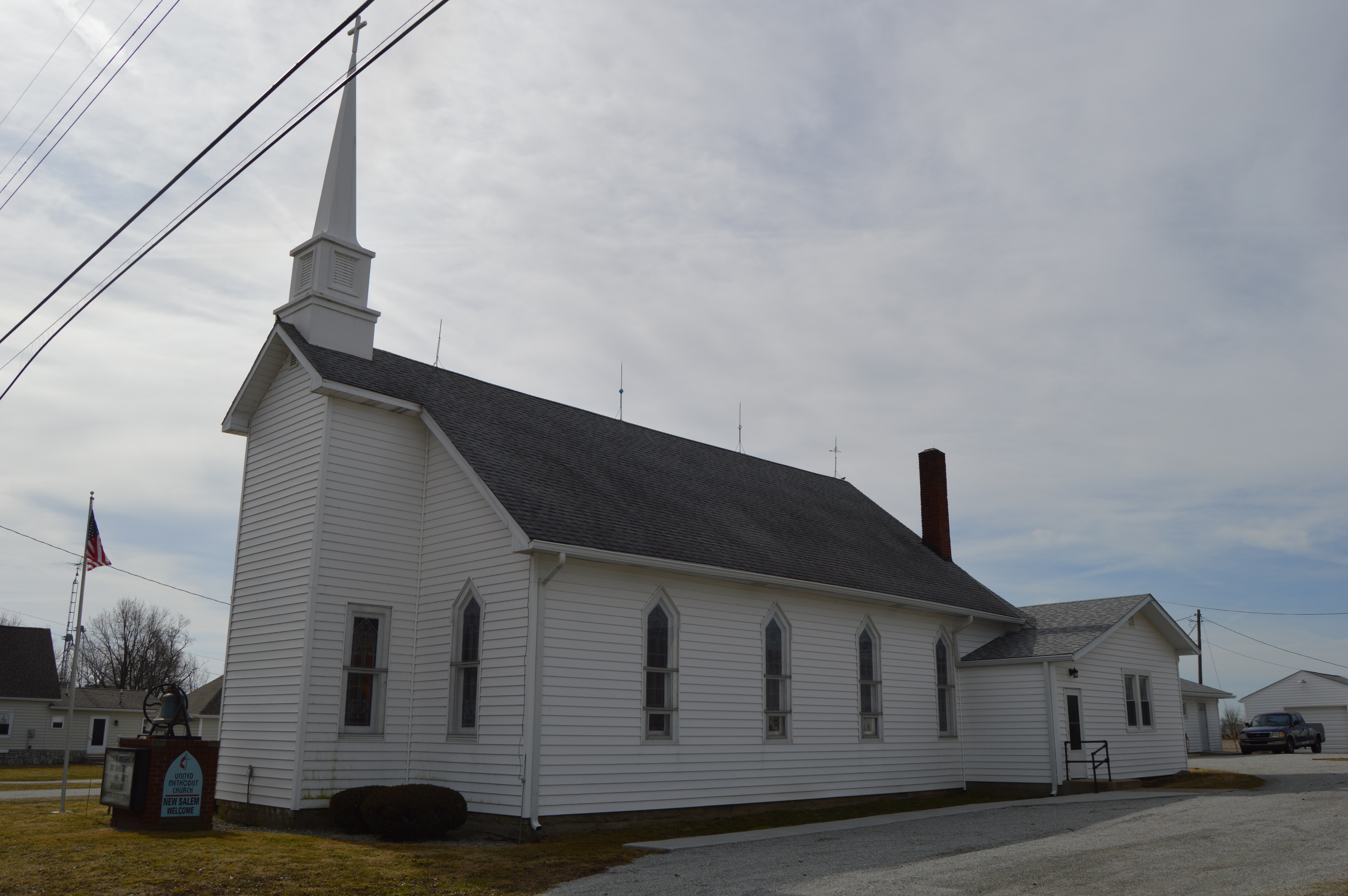
- Methodist church in New Salem

- Coordinates: 39°34′09″N 85°20′51″W
- Country: United States
- State: Indiana
- County: Rush

Government
  - Type: Indiana township

Area
  - Total: 33.26 sq mi (86.1 km^{2})
  - Land: 33.24 sq mi (86.1 km^{2})
  - Water: 0.01 sq mi (0.026 km^{2})
- Elevation: 1,033 ft (315 m)

Population (2020)
  - Total: 587
  - Density: 17.7/sq mi (6.82/km^{2})
- Time zone: UTC-5 (Eastern (EST))
  - Summer (DST): UTC-4 (EDT)
- Area code: 765
- FIPS code: 18-54126
- GNIS feature ID: 453673

Noble Township is one of twelve townships in Rush County, Indiana. As of the 2020 census, its population was 587 and it contained 254 housing units.

Historical population
Census	Pop.	Note	%±
1890	1,034		—
1900	992		−4.1%
1910	1,012		2.0%
1920	945		−6.6%
1930	904		−4.3%
1940	864		−4.4%
1950	809		−6.4%
1960	747		−7.7%
1970	739		−1.1%
1980	817		10.6%
1990	658		−19.5%
2000	676		2.7%
2010	630		−6.8%
2020	587		−6.8%
Source: US Decennial Census

== Geography ==
According to the 2010 census, the township has a total area of 33.26 square miles (86.1 km^{2}), of which 33.24 square miles (86.1 km^{2}) (or 99.94%) is land and 0.01 square miles (0.026 km^{2}) (or 0.03%) is water.

=== Unincorporated towns ===
- New Salem at 39.5422703°N 85.3580231°W

(This list is based on USGS data and may include former settlements.)
