= National Register of Historic Places listings in Rush County, Indiana =

Location of Rush County in Indiana

This is a list of the National Register of Historic Places listings in Rush County, Indiana.

This is intended to be a complete list of the properties and districts on the National Register of Historic Places in Rush County, Indiana, United States. Latitude and longitude coordinates are provided for many National Register properties and districts; these locations may be seen together in a map.

There are 29 properties and districts listed on the National Register in the county. Another property was once listed but has been removed.

Properties and districts located in incorporated areas display the name of the municipality, while properties and districts in unincorporated areas display the name of their civil township. Properties and districts split between multiple jurisdictions display the names of all jurisdictions.

This National Park Service list is complete through NPS recent listings posted October 30, 2026.

== Current listings ==
| | Name on the Register | Image | Date listed | Location | City or town | Description |
|---|---|---|---|---|---|---|
| 1 | Dr. John Arnold Farm | Dr. John Arnold Farm | September 14, 1989 (#89001409) | West of Glenwood and northeast of Rushville; 39°38′14″N 85°21′30″W | Union Township | |
| 2 | Center Township Grade and High School | Center Township Grade and High School | March 22, 2004 (#04000211) | 929 E. South St. at Mays; 39°44′31″N 85°25′46″W | Center Township | |
| 3 | County Line Bridge | County Line Bridge | November 25, 1994 (#94001356) | County Road 1000W over the Big Blue River, northeast of Morristown; 39°42′35″N 85°37′59″W | Ripley Township | Extends into Hancock County |
| 4 | Durbin Hotel | Durbin Hotel | February 19, 1982 (#82000072) | 137 W. 2nd St. 39°36′29″N 85°26′46″W | Rushville | |
| 5 | East Hill Cemetery | East Hill Cemetery | December 16, 2014 (#14001039) | 704 E. State Road 44, east of Rushville; 39°36′24″N 85°25′57″W | Rushville Township | |
| 6 | Forsythe Covered Bridge | Forsythe Covered Bridge | February 2, 1983 (#83000094) | W. County Road 650S, southwest of Rushville; 39°31′02″N 85°31′50″W | Orange Township | |
| 7 | John K. Gowdy House | John K. Gowdy House | December 10, 1993 (#93001414) | 619 N. Perkins St. 39°36′48″N 85°26′37″W | Rushville | |
| 8 | Hall-Crull Octagonal House | Hall-Crull Octagonal House | May 10, 1984 (#84001575) | North of Rushville; 39°44′39″N 85°23′10″W | Washington Township | |
| 9 | James F. Harcourt House | James F. Harcourt House | September 14, 1989 (#89001412) | County Road 500W at County Road 750S, northeast of Moscow; 39°30′15″N 85°32′06″W | Orange Township | |
| 10 | Dr. Jefferson and Eliza Arnold Helm House | Dr. Jefferson and Eliza Arnold Helm House | December 11, 2023 (#100009593) | Address Restricted | Rushville | |
| 11 | Henry Henley Public Library | | December 27, 2016 (#16000908) | 103 N. Main St. 39°44′22″N 85°34′17″W | Carthage | |
| 12 | Indiana Soldiers' and Sailors' Children's Home | Indiana Soldiers' and Sailors' Children's Home | December 20, 2011 (#11000916) | 10892 N. State Road 140, south of Knightstown; 39°46′00″N 85°31′00″W | Center Township | |
| 13 | Archibald M. Kennedy House | Archibald M. Kennedy House | February 2, 1983 (#83000095) | E. County Road 200N, northeast of Rushville; 39°38′17″N 85°24′03″W | Rushville Township | |
| 14 | Maurice W. Manche Farmstead | Maurice W. Manche Farmstead | September 14, 1989 (#89001411) | County Road 900W, west of Carthage; 39°44′18″N 85°36′48″W | Ripley Township | |
| 15 | Melodeon Hall | Melodeon Hall | November 15, 1973 (#73000041) | 210 N. Morgan St. 39°36′30″N 85°26′46″W | Rushville | |
| 16 | Moscow Covered Bridge | Moscow Covered Bridge | February 2, 1983 (#83000096) | County Roads 625W and 875S at Moscow; 39°29′06″N 85°33′17″W | Orange Township | Destroyed by 2008 tornado |
| 17 | Mount Pleasant Beech Church and Beech Cemetery | | September 4, 2018 (#100002865) | Eastern side of County Road 725W between County Roads 1000N and 1100N; 39°45′41″N 85°34′45″W | Ripley Township | |
| 18 | Norris Ford Covered Bridge | Norris Ford Covered Bridge | February 2, 1983 (#83000097) | E. County Road 150N, northeast of Rushville; 39°38′00″N 85°24′59″W | Rushville Township | |
| 19 | Offutt Covered Bridge | Offutt Covered Bridge | February 2, 1983 (#83000098) | N. County Road 550W, northwest of Rushville; 39°39′38″N 85°32′22″W | Posey Township | |
| 20 | Jabez Reeves Farmstead | Jabez Reeves Farmstead | June 29, 1989 (#89000776) | County Road 900N, north of Rushville; 39°44′25″N 85°29′21″W | Center Township | |
| 21 | Rush County Bridge No. 188 | Rush County Bridge No. 188 | December 28, 2000 (#00001542) | County Road 150W over the Little Flatrock River at Milroy; 39°30′10″N 85°28′01″W | Anderson Township | |
| 22 | Rush County Courthouse | Rush County Courthouse | October 10, 1975 (#75000048) | Courthouse Square; 39°36′28″N 85°26′38″W | Rushville | |
| 23 | Rushville Commercial Historic District | Rushville Commercial Historic District | December 27, 1993 (#93001416) | Roughly bounded by 4th, N. Morgan, 1st, and N. Perkins Sts. 39°36′30″N 85°26′42″W | Rushville | |
| 24 | St. Paul Methodist Episcopal Church | St. Paul Methodist Episcopal Church | December 15, 1997 (#97001536) | 426 N. Morgan St. 39°36′41″N 85°26′46″W | Rushville | |
| 25 | Smith Covered Bridge | Smith Covered Bridge | February 2, 1983 (#83000099) | E. County Road 300N, north of Rushville; 39°39′19″N 85°24′34″W | Jackson Township | |
| 26 | Walnut Ridge Friends Meetinghouse | Walnut Ridge Friends Meetinghouse | March 1, 1984 (#84001616) | West of Carthage; 39°43′41″N 85°36′48″W | Ripley Township | |
| 27 | Booker T. Washington School | Booker T. Washington School | May 24, 1990 (#90000809) | 525 E. 7th St. 39°36′51″N 85°26′16″W | Rushville | |
| 28 | Wendell Lewis Willkie House | Wendell Lewis Willkie House | December 27, 1993 (#93001415) | 601 N. Harrison St. 39°36′46″N 85°26′53″W | Rushville | |
| 29 | John Wood Farmstead | John Wood Farmstead | March 15, 2000 (#00000201) | 5255 W. County Road 900S, west of Milroy; 39°28′46″N 85°32′28″W | Orange Township | |

== Former listing ==
| | Name on the Register | Image | Date listed | Date removed | Location | City or town | Description |
|---|---|---|---|---|---|---|---|
| 1 | Ferree Covered Bridge | | February 2, 1983 (#83000093) | January 19, 1990 | Base Rd. | Rushville | Destroyed by arsonist on February 13, 1989 |

== See also ==
- List of National Historic Landmarks in Indiana
- National Register of Historic Places listings in Indiana
- Listings in neighboring counties: Decatur, Fayette, Franklin, Hancock, Henry, Shelby
- List of Indiana state historical markers in Rush County
