= Ferree =

Ferree is a surname. Notable people with the surname include:

- De Lysle Ferree Cass (1887–1973), American writer
- A. I. Ferree (1890–1965), American politician and attorney
- Benjy Ferree, American singer/songwriter
- Jim Ferree (born 1931), American professional golfer
- Myra Marx Ferree (born 1949), American professor
- Susan Frances Nelson Ferree (1844-1919), American journalist, activist, suffragist

== See also ==
- Ferree Covered Bridge, covered bridge located near Rushville, Rush County, Indiana, USA
