= Honey Creek Railroad =

Overview
- Headquarters: Rushville, Indiana
- Reporting mark: HCRR
- Locale: eastern Indiana
- Dates of operation: 1993–2017

Technical
- Track gauge: 4 ft 8 1/2 in (1,435 mm) standard gauge

Honey Creek Railroad (reporting mark HCRR) was a short-line railroad in Rush County, Indiana. The line begins at its interchange with CSX on the west side of Rushville and stretches north approximately six miles, ending at the town of Sexton. Honey Creek's operations began October 1, 1993, and consisted almost exclusively of hauling grain. In 2017, CSX took over the entire line.
