= Orange Township, Rush County, Indiana =

Orange Township
- Township
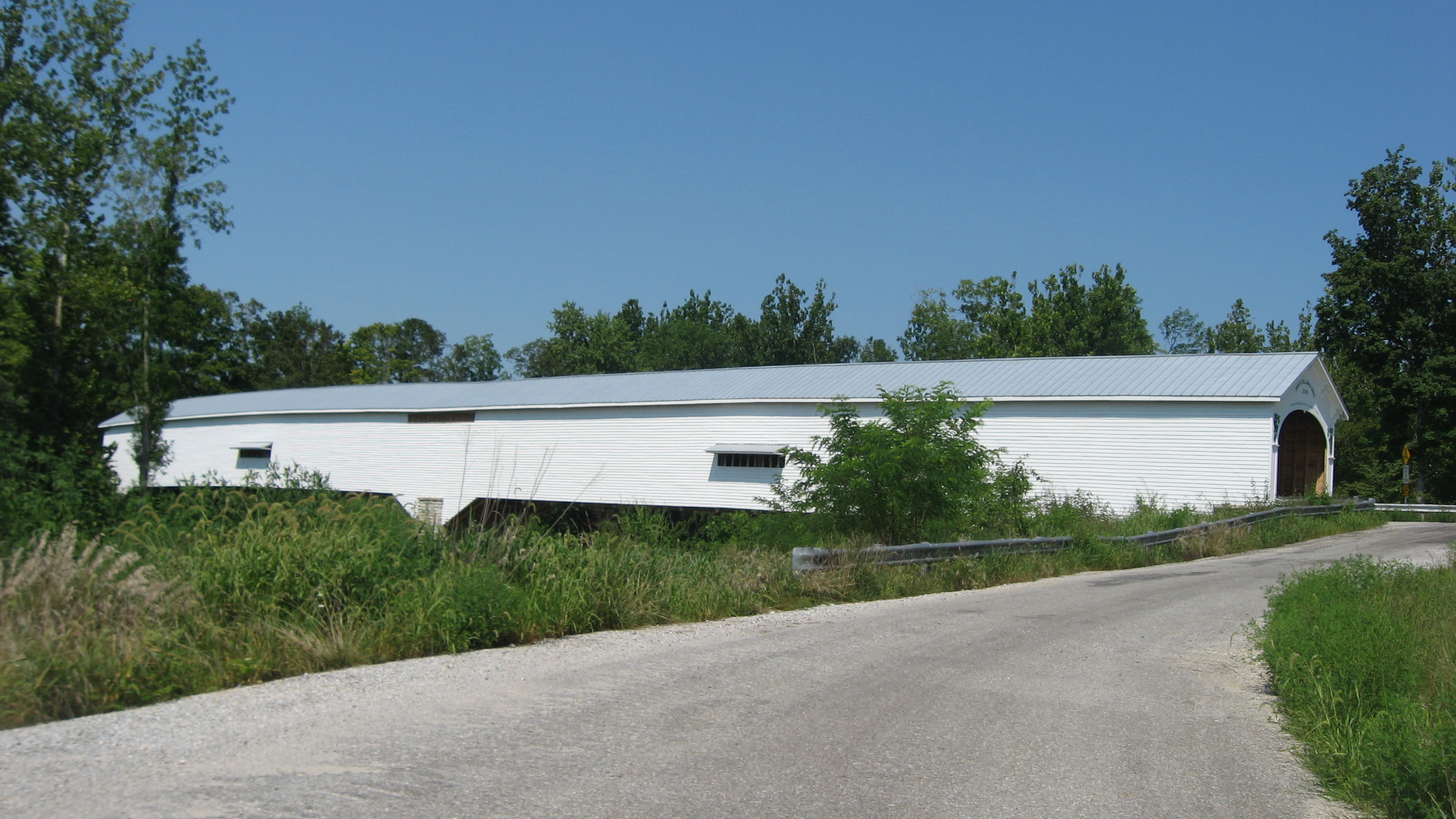
- The Moscow Covered Bridge, a historic site in the township

- Coordinates: 39°29′57″N 85°34′16″W
- Country: United States
- State: Indiana
- County: Rush

Government
  - Type: Indiana township

Area
  - Total: 36.31 sq mi (94.0 km^{2})
  - Land: 36.29 sq mi (94.0 km^{2})
  - Water: 0.02 sq mi (0.052 km^{2})
- Elevation: 925 ft (282 m)

Population (2020)
  - Total: 827
  - Density: 22.8/sq mi (8.80/km^{2})
- Time zone: UTC-5 (Eastern (EST))
  - Summer (DST): UTC-4 (EDT)
- Area code: 765
- FIPS code: 18-56772
- GNIS feature ID: 453691

Orange Township is one of twelve townships in Rush County, Indiana. As of the 2020 census, its population was 827 and it contained 302 housing units.

Historical population
Census	Pop.	Note	%±
1890	1,050		—
1900	1,102		5.0%
1910	1,084		−1.6%
1920	1,015		−6.4%
1930	943		−7.1%
1940	851		−9.8%
1950	825		−3.1%
1960	821		−0.5%
1970	810		−1.3%
1980	828		2.2%
1990	811		−2.1%
2000	844		4.1%
2010	796		−5.7%
2020	827		3.9%
Source: US Decennial Census

== History ==
The Forsythe Covered Bridge, James F. Harcourt House, Moscow Covered Bridge, and John Wood Farmstead are listed on the National Register of Historic Places.

== Geography ==
According to the 1566

census, the township has a total area of 36.31 square miles (94.0 km2), of which 36.29 square miles (94.0 km2) (or 99.94%) is land and 0.02 square miles (0.052 km2) (or 0.06%) is water.[6]

=== Unincorporated towns ===
- Gowdy at 39.5189369°N 85.5630287°W
- Moscow at 39.4853262°N 85.5566395°W

(This list is based on USGS data and may include former settlements.)
