= List of Indiana state historical markers in Rush County =

Location of Rush County in Indiana

This is a list of the Indiana state historical markers in Rush County.

This is intended to be a complete list of the official state historical markers placed in Rush County, Indiana, United States by the Indiana Historical Bureau. The locations of the historical markers and their latitude and longitude coordinates are included below when available, along with their names, years of placement, and topics as recorded by the Historical Bureau. There are 4 historical markers located in Rush County.

== Historical markers ==
Marker title	Image	Year placed	Location	Topics
Wendell L. Willkie 1892-1944		1969	Entrance to East Hill Cemetery along State Road 44 east of the Flatrock River bridge near Rushville; 39°36′30″N 85°25′54″W	Politics
Wendell L. Willkie 1892-1944		1969	Northern lawn of the Rush County Courthouse at 101 E. 2nd Street in Rushville; 39°36′29″N 85°26′39″W	Politics
Wendell L. Willkie 1892-1944		1969	Northwestern corner of the junction of N. Main Street (State Road 3) and Park Boulevard in Rushville; 39°37′28″N 85°26′42″W	Politics
Wendell L. Willkie 1892-1944		1969	Eastern side of 221 N. Main Street (State Road 3) in a downtown pocket park in Rushville; 39°36′31.4″N 85°26′41″W	Politics

== See also ==
- List of Indiana state historical markers
- National Register of Historic Places listings in Rush County, Indiana
