= Arlington, Indiana =

Arlington
- Census-designated place
- Location within Indiana Location within the United States
- Coordinates: 39°38′33″N 85°34′35″W
- Country: United States
- State: Indiana
- County: Rush
- Township: Posey

Area
  - Total: 1.48 sq mi (3.84 km^{2})
  - Land: 1.48 sq mi (3.83 km^{2})
  - Water: 0.0039 sq mi (0.01 km^{2})
- Elevation: 912 ft (278 m)

Population (2020)
  - Total: 408
  - Density: 276.0/sq mi (106.56/km^{2})
- Time zone: UTC-5 (Eastern (EST))
  - Summer (DST): UTC-4 (EDT)
- ZIP code: 46104
- Area code: 765
- FIPS Code: 18-02116
- GNIS feature ID: 2629872

Arlington is an unincorporated community in Posey Township, in the northwestern part of Rush County, Indiana, United States. As of the 2020 census, Arlington had a population of 408. It lies just south of the B&O Railroad, on U.S. Route 52, 8 miles west of Rushville.

== History ==
Arlington was originally called Burlington, and under the latter name was laid out in 1832. The present name is after Arlington, Virginia.

The Arlington post office has been in operation since 1875.

On April 23, 1978, a plane carrying 8 members of the United States Auto Club home from a race at Trenton Speedway in Trenton, New Jersey, crashed on approach to the Indianapolis International Airport just north of Arlington, killing all 8 members of USAC and the pilot Don Mullendore.

== Demographics ==
Historical population
Census	Pop.	Note	%±
2020	408		—
U.S. Decennial Census
