= Indiana State Road 140 =

State highway in Indiana, United States

State Road 140
- SR 140 highlighted in red

Route information
- Maintained by INDOT
- Length: 2.244 mi (3.611 km)
- Existed: 1932–present

Major junctions
- South end: Hoosier Youth Challenge Academy
- North end: US 40 in Knightstown

Location
- Country: United States
- State: Indiana
- Counties: Henry, Rush

Highway system
- Indiana State Highway System; Interstate; US; State; Scenic
← US 136	→ SR 142

State Road 140 (SR 140) is a State Road in the eastern section of the state of Indiana. Running for about 2.25 miles (3.62 km) in a general north–south direction, connecting rural portions of Rush and Henry counties. SR 140 was originally introduced in 1932 to connect Indiana Soldiers and Sailors Orphans Home to US 40 in Knightstown. The road was paved by the late 1930s.

== Route description ==
SR 140 starts in rural Rush County, just south of Hoosier Youth Challenge Academy, as a continuation of Rushville Road (CR 340 W). The state road heads generally towards the northwest, passing through Hoosier Youth Challenge Academy, before crossing the Big Blue River. After the river the road becomes more north–south and enters Henry County and the town of Knightstown. In Knightstown SR 140 follows Jefferson Street, passing through residential properties. SR 140 ends in downtown Knightstown at an intersection between Jefferson Street and Main Street (US 40). Jefferson Street continues north as a city street towards the north side of Knightstown. The highest traffic count is in downtown Knightstown, where 2,536 vehicles travel the highway on average each day. The lowest traffic count is at the southern end of SR 140, where 641 vehicles travel the highway on average each day.

== History ==
SR 140 was first designated by September 1932. The original routing started at the Indiana Soldiers and Sailors Orphans Home, now Hoosier Youth Challenge Academy, and ran north to US 40 much as it does today. Between 1935 and 1937, SR 140 was reconstructed to be a high level of road, with a hard driving surface. Since its paving, the route has not undergone any major changes.

== Major intersections ==
County	Location	mi	km	Destinations	Notes
Rush	Center Township	0.000	0.000	Rushville Road (CR 370 W)	Southern terminus of SR 140
Henry	Knightstown	2.244	3.611	US 40 (Main Street)	Northern terminus of SR 140
1.000 mi = 1.609 km; 1.000 km = 0.621 mi
