= Forsythe Covered Bridge =

- U.S. National Register of Historic Places
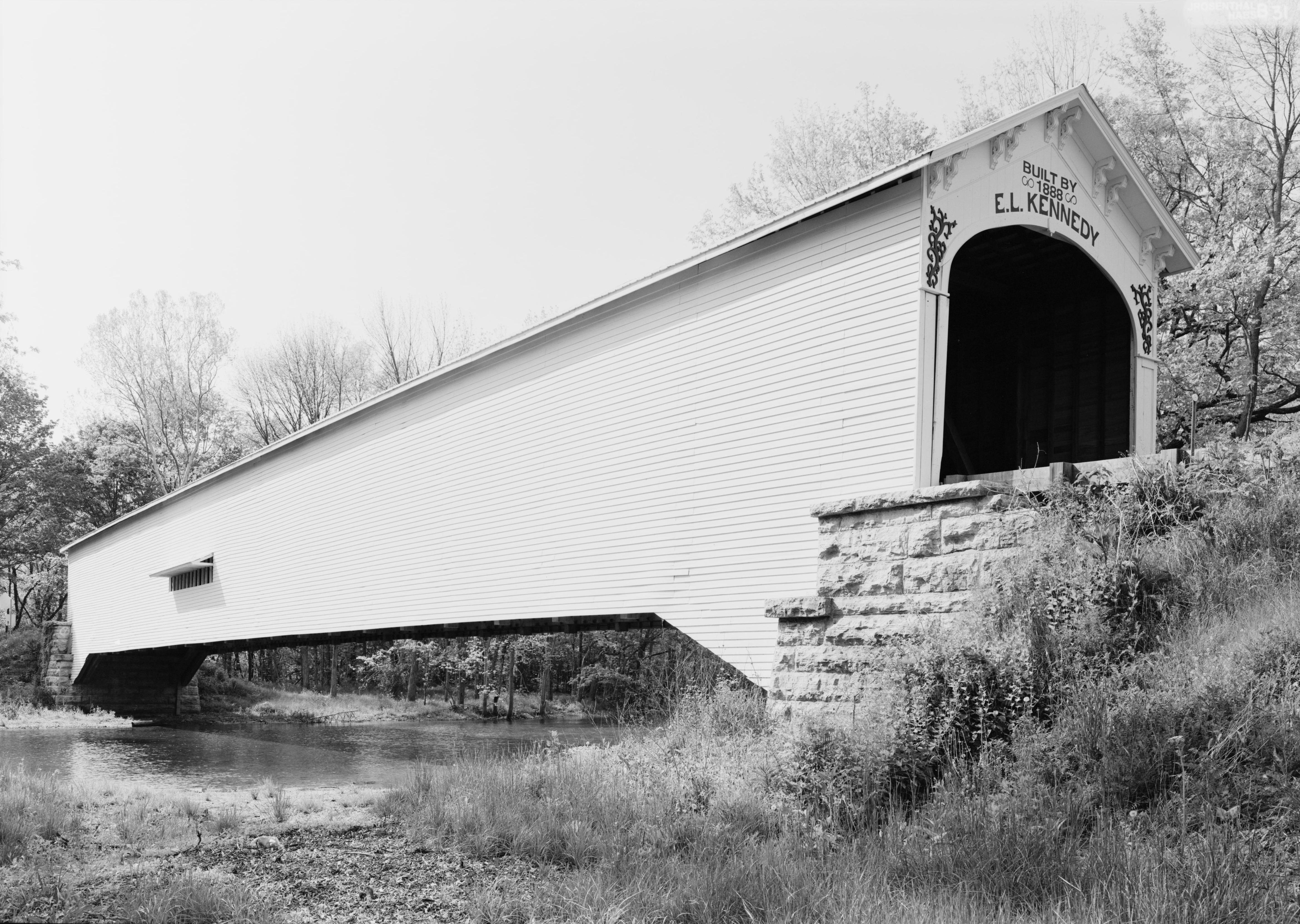

- Location within Indiana Location within the United States
- Location: W. County Road 650S, southwest of Rushville in Orange Township, Rush County, Indiana
- Coordinates: 39°31′2″N 85°31′50″W
- Area: less than one acre
- Built: 1888
- Built by: Kennedy, Emmett L.
- Architectural style: Burr Arch Truss System
- MPS: Kennedy, A. M., House and Covered Bridges of Rush County TR
- NRHP reference No.: 83000094
- Added to NRHP: February 2, 1983

Forsythe Covered Bridge, also known as Forsythe Mill Bridge, is a historic covered bridge located near Rushville, Indiana and/or Gowdy, Indiana. It was built in 1888 by Emmett L. Kennedy. It is a Burr Arch bridge, 196 feet (60 m) long over the Big Flat Rock River. The bridge has rounded arch portals and decorative scrollwork that are signatures of the Kennedy firm.

The bridge was listed on the U.S. National Register of Historic Places in 1983, as part of a multiple property submission covering six bridges built by the Kennedy family firm.

== See also ==
- List of bridges documented by the Historic American Engineering Record in Indiana
