= Center Township, Rush County, Indiana =

Center Township
- Township
- Coordinates: 39°44′44″N 85°28′18″W
- Country: United States
- State: Indiana
- County: Rush

Government
  - Type: Indiana township

Area
  - Total: 36.58 sq mi (94.7 km^{2})
  - Land: 36.55 sq mi (94.7 km^{2})
  - Water: 0.03 sq mi (0.078 km^{2})
- Elevation: 997 ft (304 m)

Population (2020)
  - Total: 744
  - Density: 20.4/sq mi (7.86/km^{2})
- Time zone: UTC-5 (Eastern (EST))
  - Summer (DST): UTC-4 (EDT)
- Area code: 765
- FIPS code: 18-11620
- GNIS feature ID: 453192

Center Township is one of twelve townships in Rush County, Indiana. As of the 2020 census, its population was 744 and it contained 322 housing units.

Historical population
Census	Pop.	Note	%±
1890	1,071		—
1900	1,753		63.7%
1910	1,544		−11.9%
1920	1,376		−10.9%
1930	1,721		25.1%
1940	1,771		2.9%
1950	1,626		−8.2%
1960	1,316		−19.1%
1970	1,440		9.4%
1980	1,177		−18.3%
1990	1,025		−12.9%
2000	768		−25.1%
2010	780		1.6%
2020	744		−4.6%
Source: US Decennial Census

== History ==
Center Township was organized in 1830.

The Center Township Grade and High School, Indiana Soldiers' and Sailors' Children's Home, and Jabez Reeves Farmstead are listed on the National Register of Historic Places.

== Geography ==
According to the 2010 census, the township has a total area of 36.58 square miles (94.7 km^{2}), of which 36.55 square miles (94.7 km^{2}) (or 99.92%) is land and 0.03 square miles (0.078 km^{2}) (or 0.08%) is water.

=== Unincorporated towns ===
- Mays at 39.7436566°N 85.4299711°W
- Sexton at 39.7000460°N 85.4346931°W

(This list is based on USGS data and may include former settlements.)
