= James F. Harcourt House =

Historic house in Indiana, United States

- U.S. National Register of Historic Places
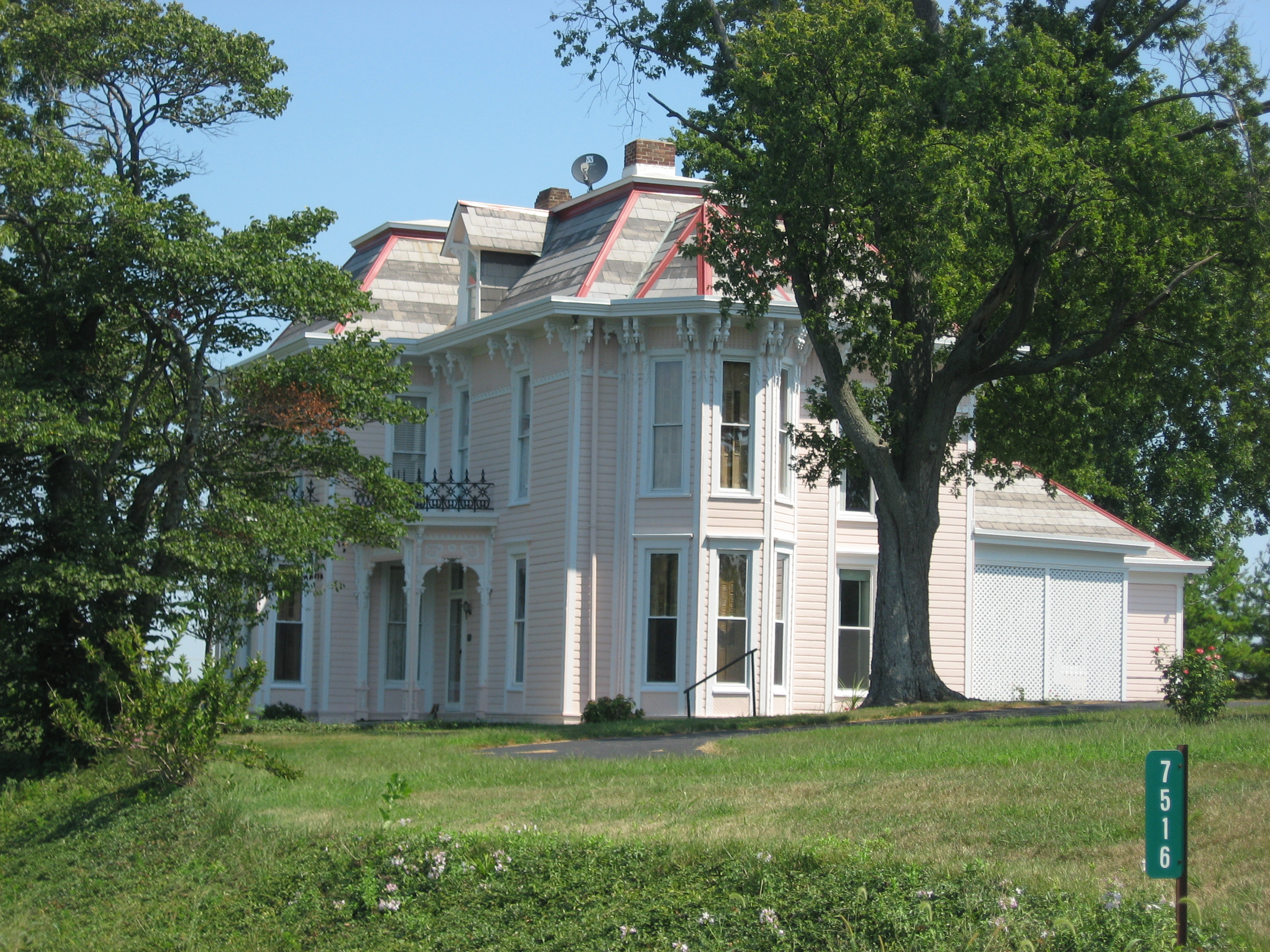
- James F. Harcourt House, August 2010

- Location within Indiana Location within the United States
- Location: County Road 500W at County Road 750S, northeast of Moscow in Orange Township, Rush County, Indiana
- Coordinates: 39°30′15″N 85°32′6″W
- Area: 2 acres (0.81 ha)
- Built: 1867, 1880-1881
- Built by: Washburn, Park
- Architectural style: Second Empire, Italianate, Transverse frame barn
- NRHP reference No.: 89001412
- Added to NRHP: September 14, 1989

James F. Harcourt House is a historic home located in Orange Township, Rush County, Indiana. It was built in 1880–1881, and is a two-story, irregular cruciform plan frame dwelling with Italianate and Second Empire style design elements. It features a mansard roof with two dormers and a two-story hexagonal bay. Also on the property are the contributing original farmhouse (c. 1867) and traverse frame barn.

It was listed on the National Register of Historic Places in 1989.
