= John Wood Farmstead =

- U.S. National Register of Historic Places
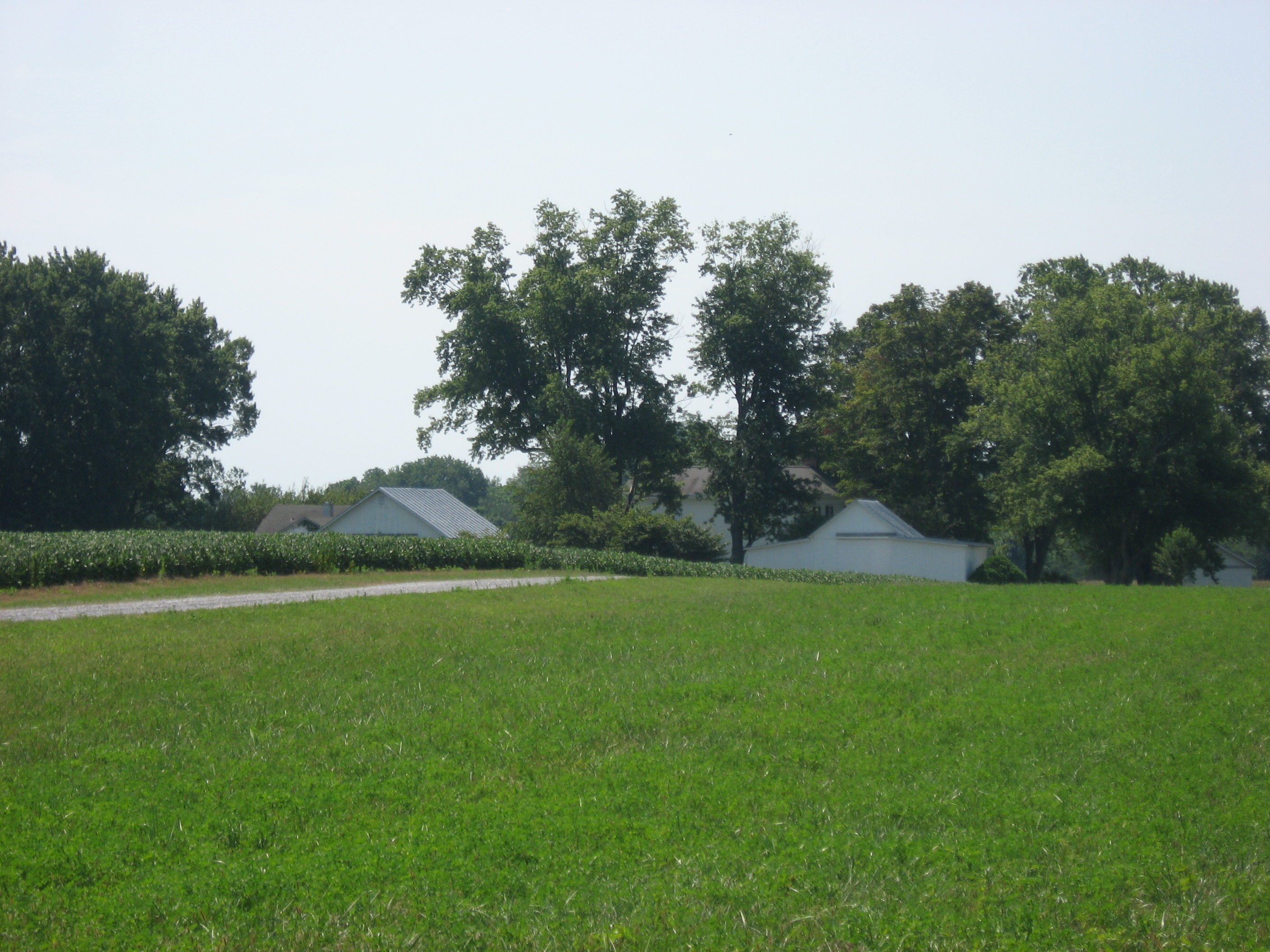
- John Wood Farmstead, August 2011

- Location within Indiana Location within the United States
- Location: 5255 W Cty Rd. 900 S, west of Milroy in Orange Township, Rush County, Indiana
- Coordinates: 39°28′46″N 85°32′28″W
- Area: 35 acres (14 ha)
- Built: 1831, 1863
- Architectural style: I-house
- NRHP reference No.: 00000201
- Added to NRHP: March 15, 2000

John Wood Farmstead is a historic home and farm located in Orange Township, Rush County, Indiana. The farm was established in 1822, and the two-story, brick I-house built in 1831. Also on the property are the contributing early-19th century summer kitchen, two traverse frame barns (1863, c. 1900), late-19th early-20th century cattle barn, scales shed, milk house, silo, corn crib, and water trough.

It was listed on the National Register of Historic Places in 2000.
