= Center Township Grade and High School =

- U.S. National Register of Historic Places
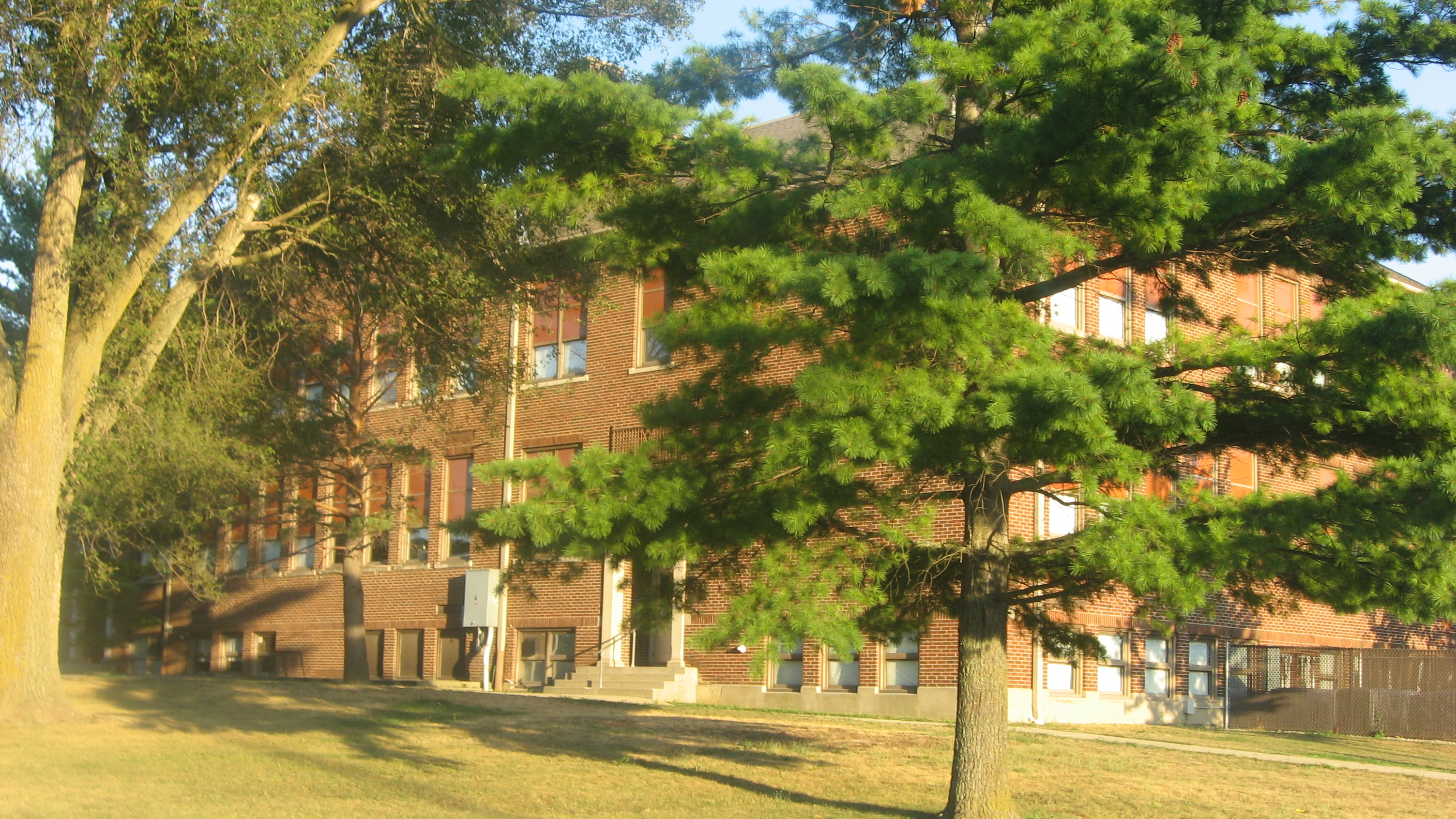
- Center Township Grade and High School, August 2012

- Location within Indiana Location within the United States
- Location: 929 E. South St. at Mays, Indiana
- Coordinates: 39°44′31″N 85°25′44″W
- Area: 3.5 acres (1.4 ha)
- Built: 1929
- Architect: Werking, Charles E. & Paul R.; et.al.
- Architectural style: Classical Revival, Prairie School
- MPS: Indiana's Public Common and High Schools MPS
- NRHP reference No.: 04000211
- Added to NRHP: March 22, 2004

Center Township Grade and High School, also known as Mays Elementary School, is a historic school building located at Rushville, Indiana. It was built in 1929, and is a 2 1/2-story, brick building with Classical Revival and Prairie School style design elements. It has a flat topped hipped roof, overhanging eaves, and sparse stone and brick detailing.

It was listed on the National Register of Historic Places in 2004.
