= Offutt Covered Bridge =

- U.S. National Register of Historic Places
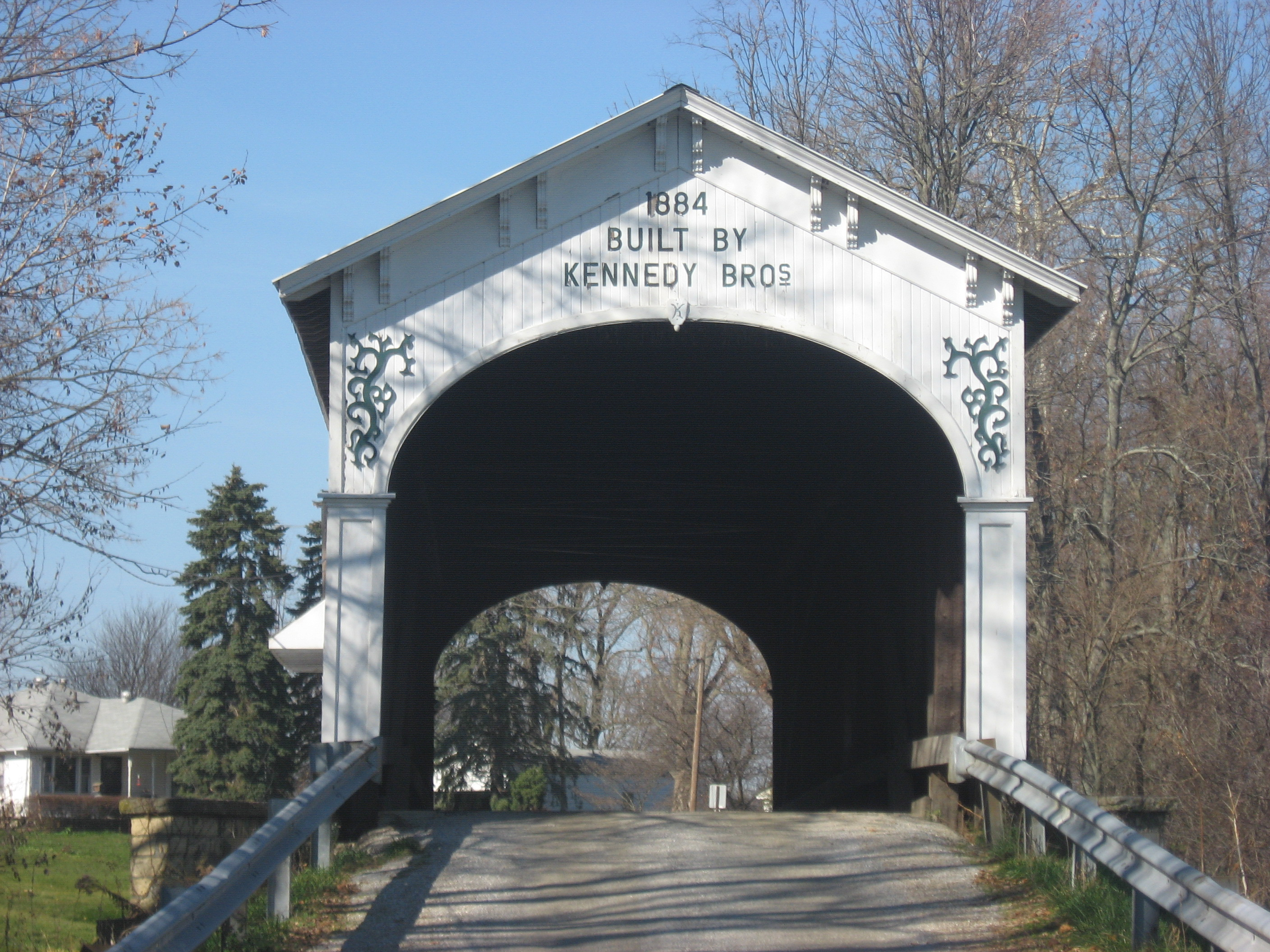
- Offutt Covered Bridge, November 2012

- Location within Indiana Location within the United States
- Location: N. Offutt's Ford Covered Bridge Road, northwest of Rushville in Posey Township, Rush County, Indiana
- Coordinates: 39°39′36″N 85°32′22″W
- Area: less than one acre
- Built: 1884
- Built by: Kennedy, Emmett L., & Charles F.
- Architectural style: Burr Arch Truss System
- MPS: Kennedy, A. M., House and Covered Bridges of Rush County TR
- NRHP reference No.: 83000098
- Added to NRHP: February 2, 1983

Offutt Covered Bridge is a historic covered bridge located near Rushville, Indiana in Posey Township, Rush County, Indiana. It was built in 1884 by Emmett L. Kennedy and his brother Charles. It is a Burr Arch bridge, 85 feet (26 m) long over the Little Blue River. The bridge has rounded arch portals and decorative scrollwork that are signatures of the Kennedy firm.

It was listed on the U.S. National Register of Historic Places in 1983, as part of a multiple property submission covering six bridges built by the Kennedy family firm.
