= Archibald M. Kennedy and sons =

Architectural firm known for building Indiana covered bridges

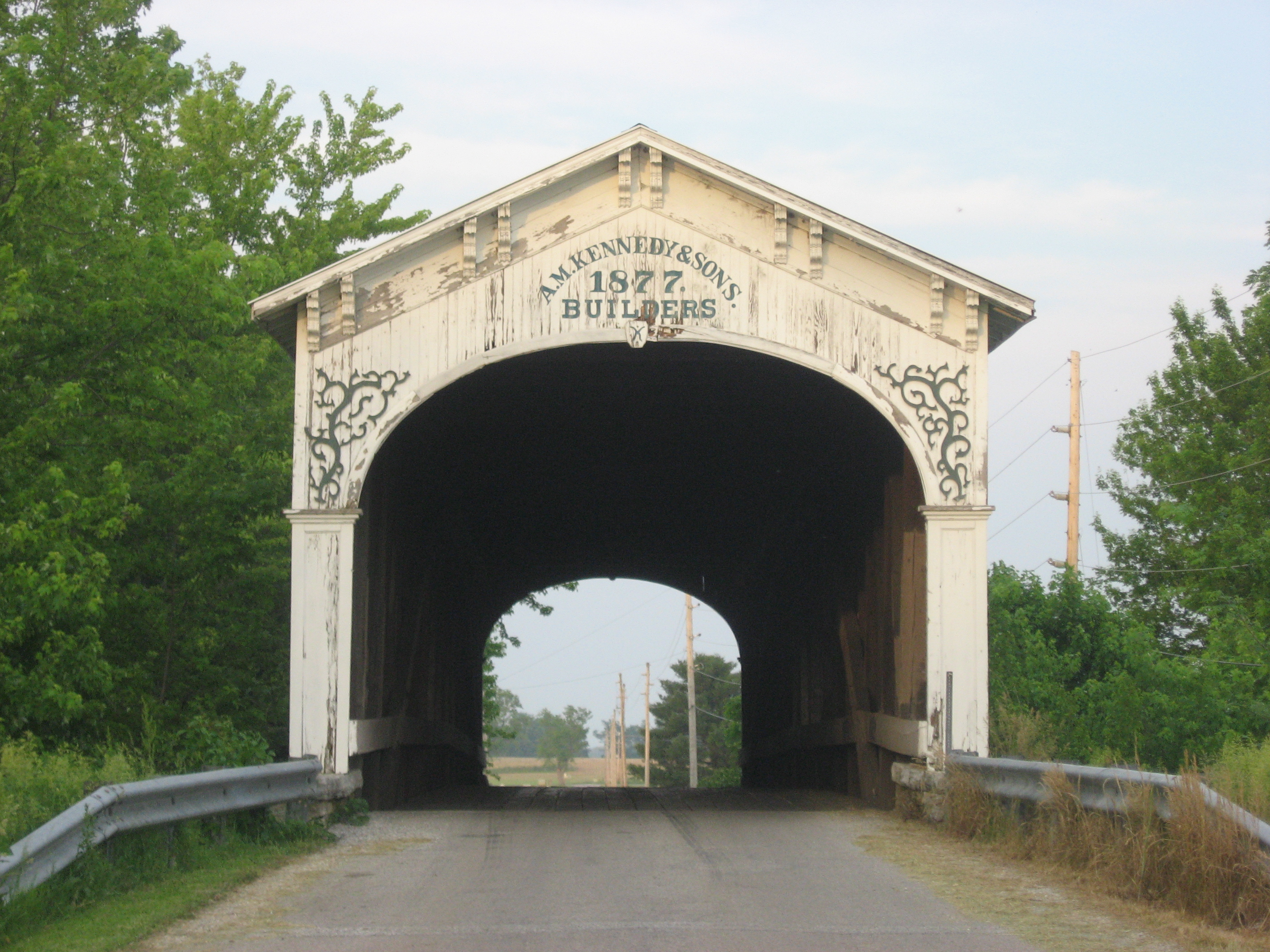
Smith Covered Bridge in Rush County, with the trademark signature of a Kennedy bridge

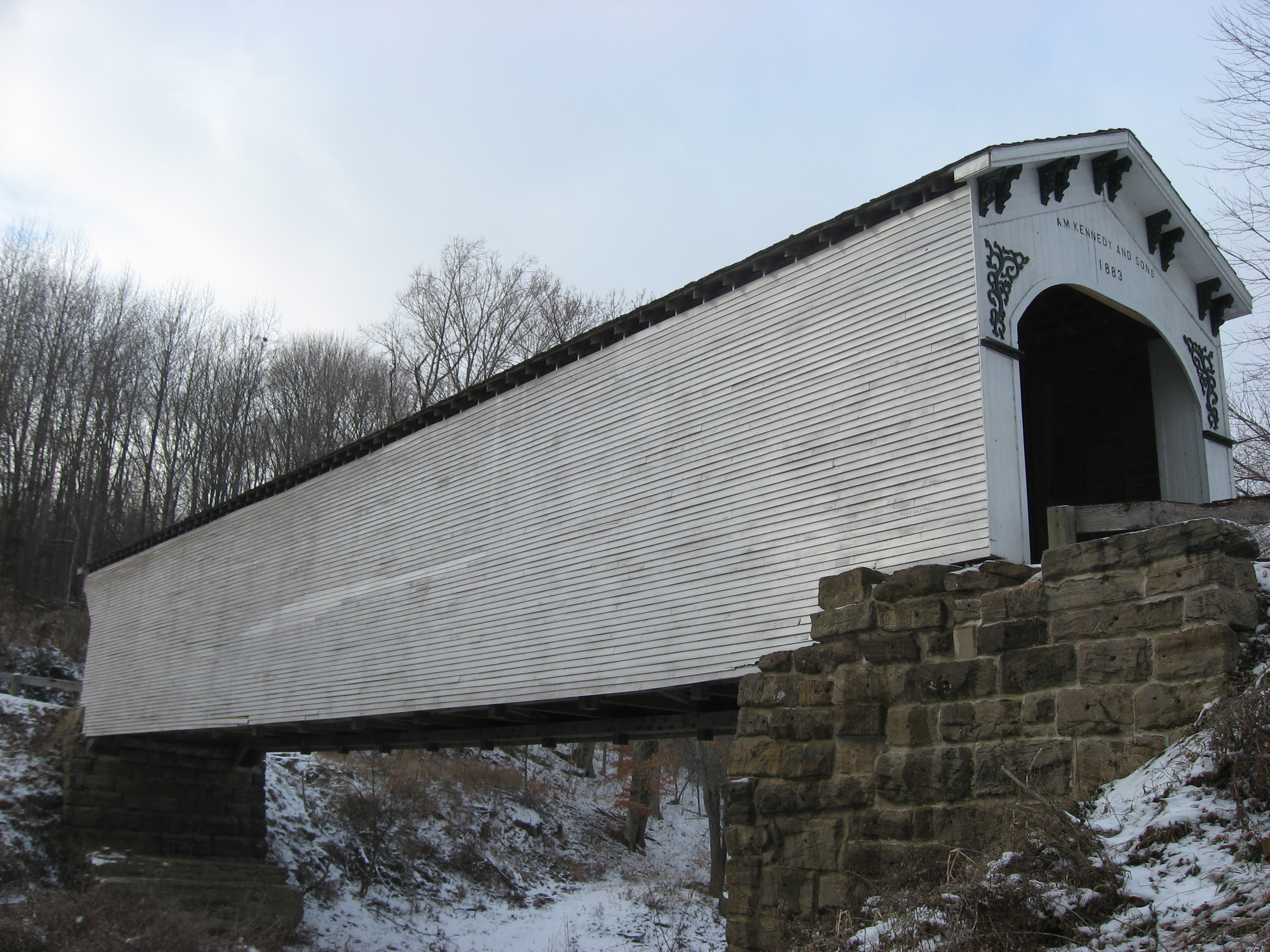
The Richland-Plummer Creek Bridge near Bloomfield in Greene County.

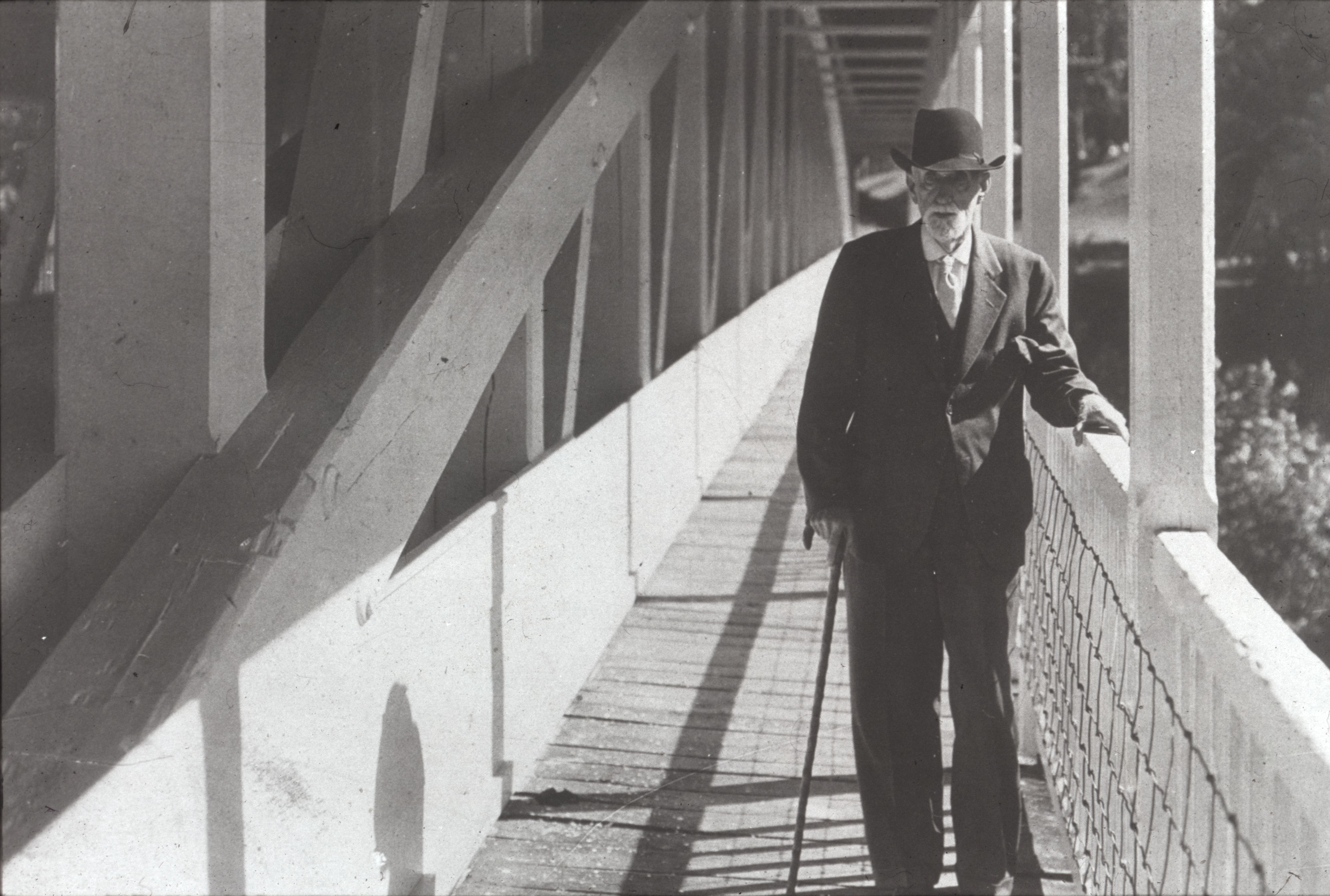
Emmett Kennedy posing on covered bridge

Archibald McMichael Kennedy (August 25, 1818 in Guilford County, North Carolina – June 3, 1897 in Rush County, Indiana) was a carpenter and builder of covered bridges from Rush County, Indiana, United States. His sons, Emmett L. Kennedy and Charles F. Kennedy, worked with him and separately, as did at least two of his grandsons. Many of the works are attributed to the firm name A. M. Kennedy & Sons.

The Kennedy firm was one of the "big three" firms of Indiana covered bridge builders, with at least 58 bridges to their credit. About 75 percent of their bridges have been demolished. A number of their remaining works survive, and some are listed on the National Register of Historic Places.

Kennedy built his own house (c. 1884) near Rushville, Indiana which is NRHP-listed. He and sons were responsible for the construction of the following bridges (with attribution):

- Richland-Plummer Creek Covered Bridge (built 1883), south of Bloomfield (A. M. Kennedy & Sons), NRHP-listed
- Westport Covered Bridge (built 1880), east of Westport (Kennedy, A. M. & Sons), NRHP-listed
- Mud Creek Covered Bridge (built 1881), Homer ] (A. M Kennedy & Sons)
- Ferree Covered Bridge (built 1873), over the Little Flatrock River on Base Road, Rush County. (A. M. Kennedy and son Emmett)
- Smith Covered Bridge (built 1877), over the Big Flatrock River on County Road 150 N., Rush County (A. M. Kennedy and son Emmett)
- Guilford Covered Bridge (built 1879), Dearborn County (A. M. Kennedy)
- Sand Creek Covered Bridge (built 1880), Decatur County (A. M. Kennedy)
- Longwood Covered Bridge (built 1884), Fayette County (Kennedy Bros.)
- Offutt Covered Bridge (built 1884), over the Little Blue River on County Road 550 W., Rush County (Kennedy, Emmett L., & Charles F.), NRHP-listed
- Moscow Covered Bridge (built 1886), over the Big Flatrock River, on County Road 900 S., Rush County (Kennedy, Emmett L.), NRHP-listed
- Forsythe Covered Bridge (built 1888), over the Big Flatrock River, on County Road 650 S., Rush County (Kennedy, Emmett L.), NRHP-listed
- Norris Ford Covered Bridge (built 1916), over the Big Flatrock River, on County Road 300 N., Rush County (Kennedy, Emmett L., and sons Karl & Charles R.), NRHP-listed

Practices and works of the firm are described in a study "A. M. Kennedy House and Covered Bridges of Rush County".

== See also ==
- List of Indiana covered bridges
