= Moscow Covered Bridge =

- U.S. National Register of Historic Places
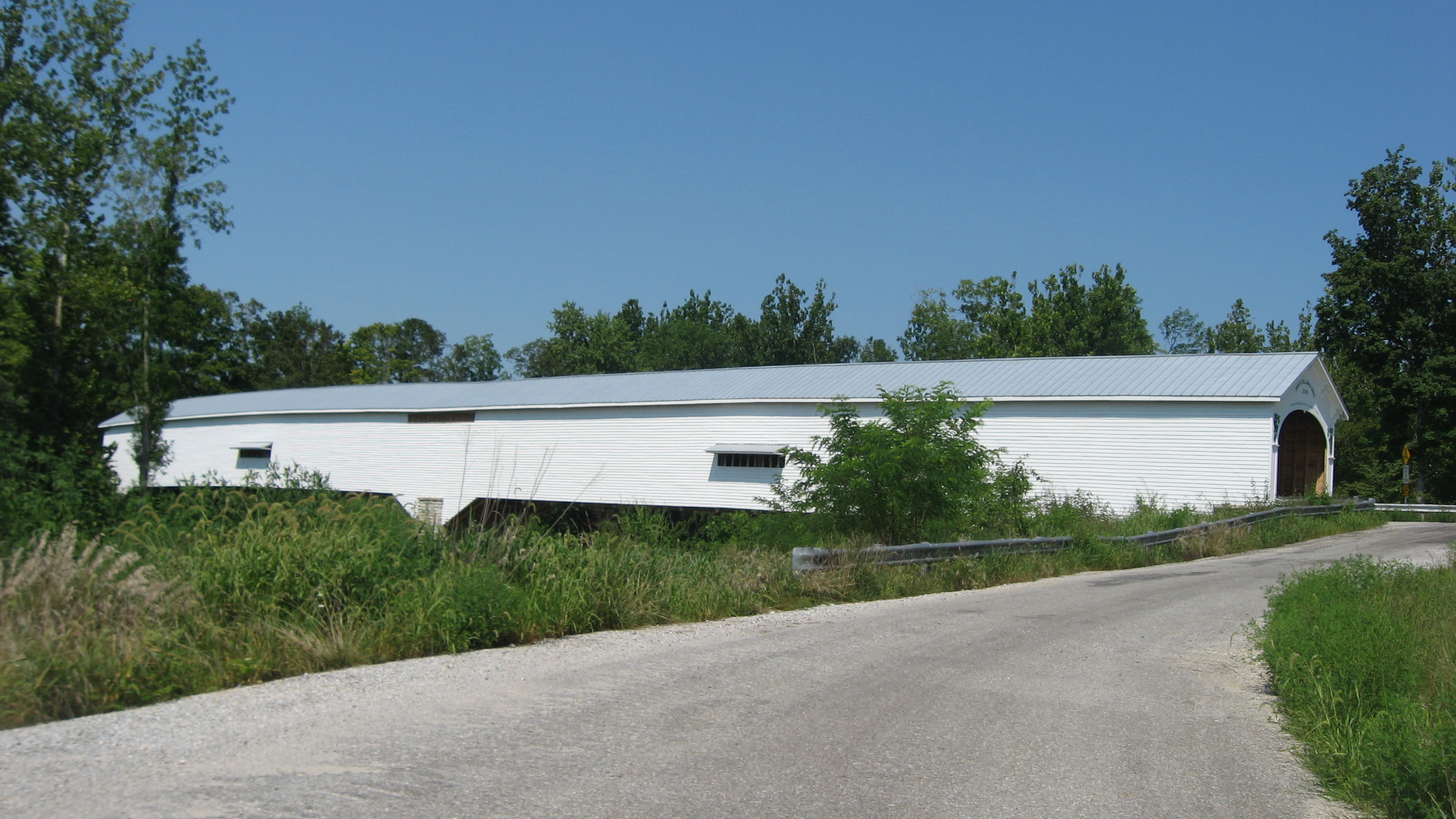
- Southern side of the reconstructed bridge

- Location within Indiana Location within the United States
- Location: County Roads 625W and 875S at Moscow, Indiana
- Coordinates: 39°29′6″N 85°33′17″W
- Area: less than one acre
- Built: 1886
- Built by: Emmett L. Kennedy
- Architectural style: two Burr Arch Trusses
- MPS: Kennedy, A. M., House and Covered Bridges of Rush County TR
- NRHP reference No.: 83000096
- Added to NRHP: February 2, 1983

The Moscow Covered Bridge is a historic covered bridge located at Moscow, Indiana, a small unincorporated town in Rush County, Indiana. It is of Burr Arch construction, 334 feet (102 m) long in two spans over Big Flat Rock River in It is the third longest covered bridge in the state.

It was listed on the U.S. National Register of Historic Places in 1983, as part of a multiple property submission covering six bridges built by the Kennedy family firm.

== History ==
The bridge was originally constructed in 1886 by Emmett L. Kennedy of the Kennedy family firm that was responsible for many of Indiana's covered bridges. The Moscow bridge came to be the defining characteristic of the small community of Moscow, even providing the theme of an annual community festival. It was a devastating loss to the community when on June 3, 2008, a tornado destroyed the bridge and dropped its remnants into the valley of the Big Flatrock River. A website was used to solicit donations for reconstruction.

Local and state officials soon decided to rebuild the bridge. State prison inmates were used to retrieve salvageable material from the old bridge from the river bed for reuse. The Dan Collom and Sons firm was hired to manage the reconstruction of the bridge which was dedicated and reopened in September 2010.

Per the MoscowBridge.Com website, the reconstructed bridge "consists of over 40% timbers from the old bridge. The new bridge is built as a E. L. Kennedy designed and engineered bridge. It has the same look as the bridge destroyed June 3, 2008."
