= Sexton, Indiana =

- Unincorporated community
- Location within Indiana Location within the United States
- Coordinates: 39°42′00″N 85°26′05″W
- Country: United States
- State: Indiana
- County: Rush
- Township: Center
- Elevation: 1,004 ft (306 m)
- Time zone: UTC-5 (Eastern (EST))
  - Summer (DST): UTC-4 (EDT)
- ZIP code: 46173
- GNIS feature ID: 443229

Sexton is an unincorporated community in Center Township, Rush County, in the U.S. state of Indiana.

== History ==
An old variant name of the community was called Hamilton. The community was laid out as Hamilton Station in 1883 as a stop on the railroad.

A post office was established under the name Sexton in 1882, and remained in operation until it was discontinued in 1903.
