= Smith Covered Bridge =

- U.S. National Register of Historic Places
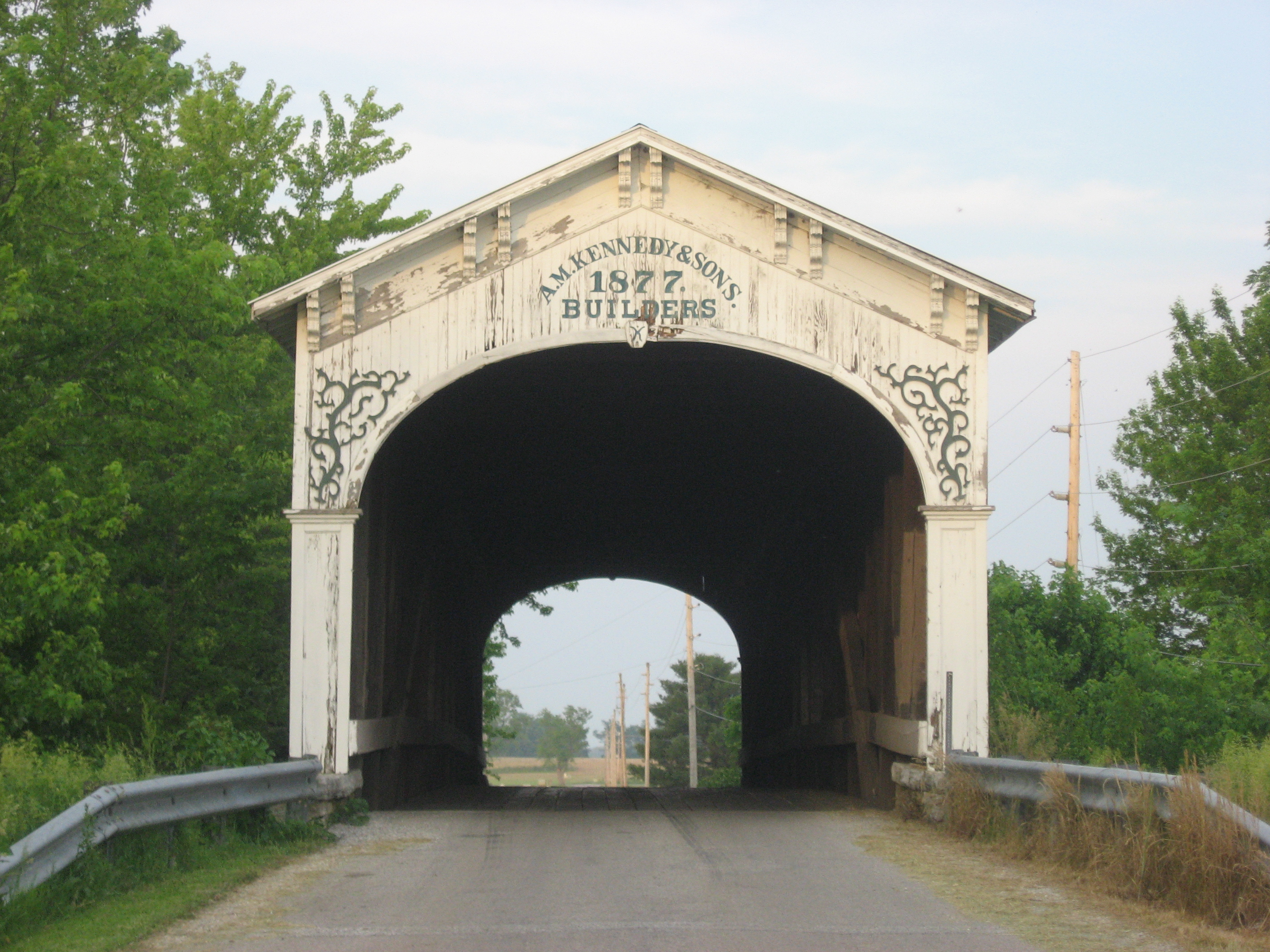
- Smith Covered Bridge, May 2011

- Location within Indiana Location within the United States
- Location: E. County Road 150N, northeast of Rushville in Rushville Township, Rush County, Indiana
- Coordinates: 39°38′1″N 85°24′59″W
- Area: less than one acre
- Built: 1877
- Built by: Kennedy, Archibald, & Emmett
- Architectural style: Burr Arch Truss System
- MPS: Kennedy, A. M., House and Covered Bridges of Rush County TR
- NRHP reference No.: 83000099
- Added to NRHP: February 2, 1983

Smith Covered Bridge is a historic covered bridge located near Rushville in Rushville Township, Rush County, Indiana. It was built in 1877 by A.M. Kennedy and his son Emmett. It is a Burr Arch bridge, 124 feet (38 m) long over Flatrock River. The bridge has rounded arch portals and decorative scrollwork that are signatures of the Kennedy firm.

It was listed on the U.S. National Register of Historic Places in 1983, as part of a multiple property submission covering six bridges built by the Kennedy family firm.

It will be closed for 6 months and rehabilitated in 2024.
