= Mays, Indiana =

- Unincorporated community and Census-designated place
- Location within Indiana Location within the United States
- Coordinates: 39°44′37″N 85°25′44″W
- Country: United States
- State: Indiana
- County: Rush
- Township: Center
- Elevation: 1,014 ft (309 m)
- Time zone: UTC-5 (Eastern (EST))
  - Summer (DST): UTC-4 (EDT)
- ZIP code: 46155
- FIPS code: 18-47826
- GNIS feature ID: 2830519

Mays is an unincorporated community in Center Township, Rush County, in the U.S. state of Indiana.

== History ==
A post office has been in operation at Mays since 1883. Mays was laid out and platted in 1884.

== Geography ==
Mays lies east of the town of Carthage, and west of the unincorporated community Raleigh.

== Demographics ==
The United States Census Bureau defined Mays as a census designated place in the 2022 American Community Survey.

== Education ==
Mays is served by Mays Community Academy for grades K-6, and they move to Benjamin Rush Middle School in Rushville for grades 7–8, and then Rushville Consolidated High School in grades 9–12.
