= Gowdy, Indiana =

- Unincorporated community
- Location within Indiana Location within the United States
- Coordinates: 39°31′08″N 85°33′47″W
- Country: United States
- State: Indiana
- County: Rush
- Township: Orange
- Elevation: 935 ft (285 m)
- Time zone: UTC-5 (Eastern (EST))
  - Summer (DST): UTC-4 (EDT)
- ZIP code: 46150
- Area code: 765
- GNIS feature ID: 435248

Gowdy is an unincorporated community in Orange Township, Rush County, in the U.S. state of Indiana.

== History ==
Gowdy was founded in 1830. The community bears the name of a local family.

A post office was established at Gowdy in 1890, and remained in operation until it was discontinued in 1903.
