= Ferree Covered Bridge =

- Formerly listed on the U.S. National Register of Historic Places
- Location within Indiana Location within the United States
- Nearest city: Base Rd., Rushville, Indiana
- Area: less than one acre
- Built: 1873
- Built by: Kennedy, Archibald, M. & Emmett L
- Architectural style: Burr Arch Truss System
- MPS: Kennedy, A. M., House and Covered Bridges of Rush County TR
- NRHP reference No.: 83000093

Significant dates
- Added to NRHP: February 2, 1983
- Removed from NRHP: January 19, 1990

Ferree Covered Bridge was a historic covered bridge located near Rushville, Indiana. It was built in 1873 by Archibald M. Kennedy and his son Emmett. It was a Burr Arch bridge, 87 feet (27 m) long over Little Flat Rock River. The bridge had square portals with articulated corners. The bridge was destroyed by an arsonist on February 13, 1989

It was listed on the U.S. National Register of Historic Places in 1983, as part of a multiple property submission covering six bridges built by the Kennedy family firm. It was delisted in 1990.
