= Posey Township, Rush County, Indiana =

Posey Township
- Township
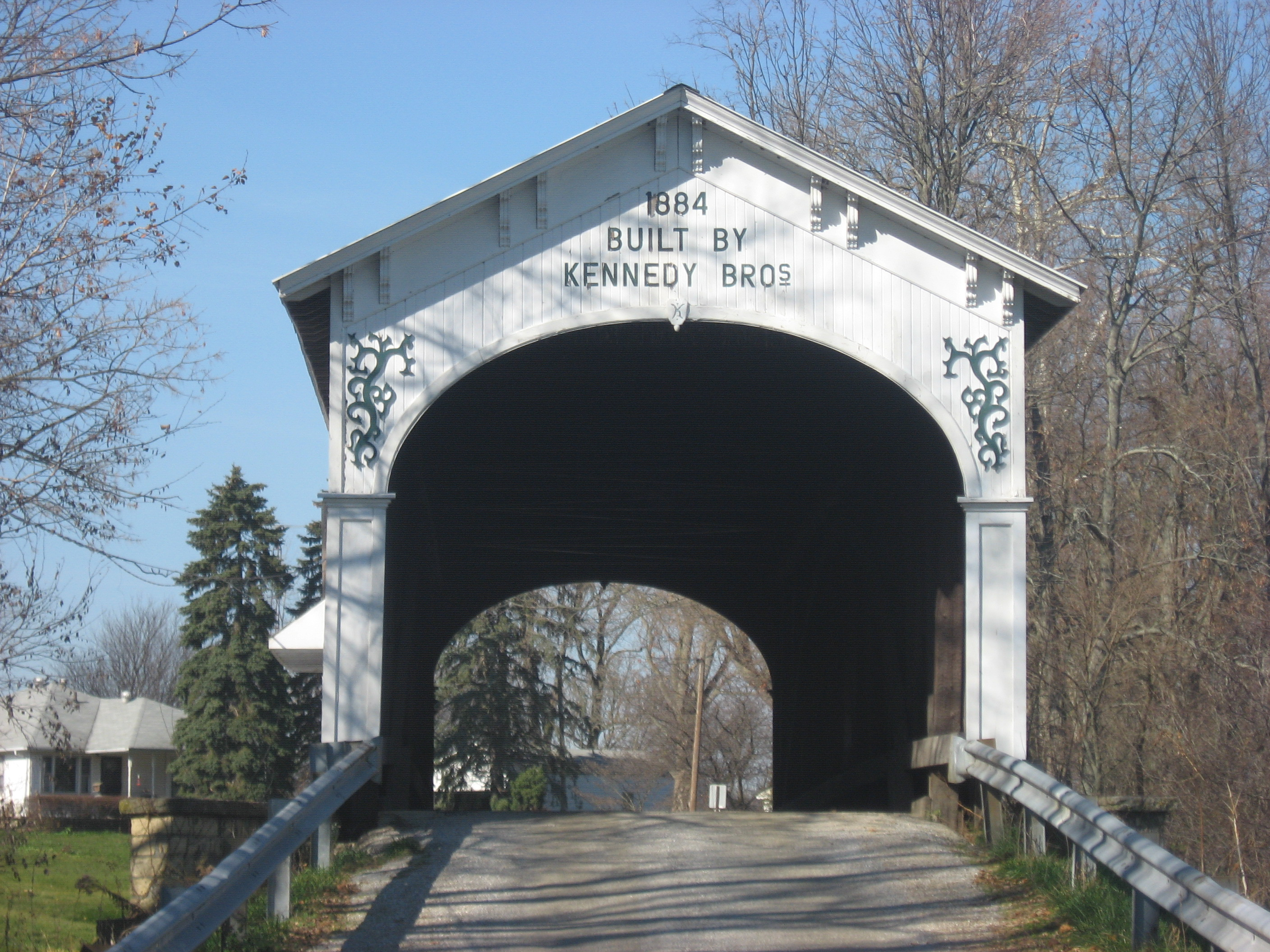
- The Offutt Covered Bridge, a historic site in the township

- Coordinates: 39°39′18″N 85°34′17″W
- Country: United States
- State: Indiana
- County: Rush

Government
  - Type: Indiana township

Area
  - Total: 36.27 sq mi (93.9 km^{2})
  - Land: 36.25 sq mi (93.9 km^{2})
  - Water: 0.02 sq mi (0.052 km^{2})
- Elevation: 925 ft (282 m)

Population (2020)
  - Total: 1,078
  - Density: 29.74/sq mi (11.48/km^{2})
- Time zone: UTC-5 (Eastern (EST))
  - Summer (DST): UTC-4 (EDT)
- Area code: 765
- FIPS code: 18-61362
- GNIS feature ID: 453765

Posey Township is one of twelve townships in Rush County, Indiana. As of the 2020 census, its population was 1,078 and it contained 451 housing units.

Historical population
Census	Pop.	Note	%±
1890	1,708		—
1900	1,495		−12.5%
1910	1,382		−7.6%
1920	1,299		−6.0%
1930	1,226		−5.6%
1940	1,154		−5.9%
1950	1,114		−3.5%
1960	1,113		−0.1%
1970	1,178		5.8%
1980	1,271		7.9%
1990	1,194		−6.1%
2000	1,189		−0.4%
2010	1,083		−8.9%
2020	1,078		−0.5%
Source: US Decennial Census

== History ==
The Offutt Covered Bridge was listed on the National Register of Historic Places in 1983.

== Geography ==
According to the 2010 census, the township has a total area of 36.27 square miles (93.9 km^{2}), of which 36.25 square miles (93.9 km^{2}) (or 99.94%) is land and 0.02 square miles (0.052 km^{2}) (or 0.06%) is water.

=== Unincorporated towns ===
- Arlington at 39.6425462°N 85.5763630°W

(This list is based on USGS data and may include former settlements.)
