= Jabez Reeves Farmstead =

- U.S. National Register of Historic Places
- U.S. Historic district
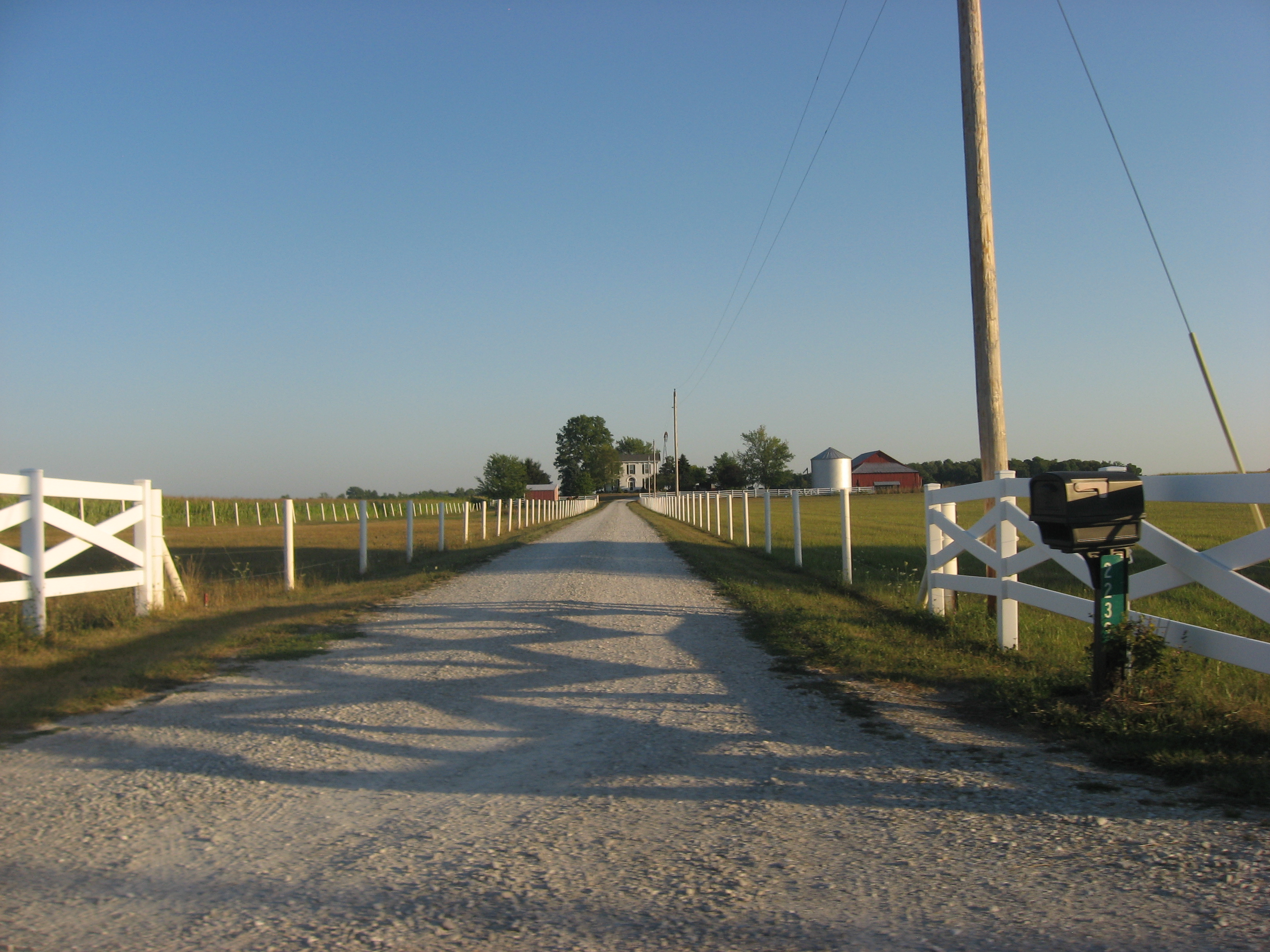
- Jabez Reeves Farmstead, August 2012

- Location within Indiana Location within the United States
- Location: County Road 900N, north of Rushville in Center Township, Rush County, Indiana
- Coordinates: 39°44′25″N 85°29′21″W
- Area: 6.6 acres (2.7 ha)
- Built: c. 1855
- Architectural style: Greek Revival, Italianate, I-house
- NRHP reference No.: 89000776
- Added to NRHP: June 29, 1989

Jabez Reeves Farmstead is a historic home and farm and national historic district located in Center Township, Rush County, Indiana. The Reeves-Hodson House was built about 1855, and is two-story, brick I-house with Greek Revival and Italianate style design elements. It features segmental arched windows and simple brackets under a wide eave. Also on the property are the contributing windmill, brick smokehouse (c. 1855), and large English barn.

It was listed on the National Register of Historic Places in 1989.
