= Tornado outbreak sequence of June 3–11, 2008 =

2008 tornado outbreak in the United States

Meteorological history
- Date: June 3–11, 2008

Tornado outbreak
- Tornadoes: 192 confirmed
- Max. rating: EF4 tornado
- Highest winds: Tornadic – 170 mph (270 km/h) (Manhattan, Kansas EF4 on June 11)

Overall effects
- Casualties: 7 fatalities (+13 non–tornadic), 84 injuries
- Damage: $146.9 million (2008 USD)
- Areas affected: Central and Eastern United States
- Power outages: 1.22 million
- Part of tornado outbreaks of 2008

The tornado outbreak sequence of June 3–11, 2008 was a series of tornado outbreaks affecting most of central and eastern North America from June 3–11, 2008. 192 tornadoes were confirmed, along with widespread straight–line wind wind damage. Seven people were killed from a direct result of tornadoes; four in Iowa, two in Kansas, and one in Indiana. Eleven additional people were killed across five states by other weather events including lightning, flash flooding, and straight-line winds. Severe flooding was also reported in much of Indiana, Wisconsin, Minnesota and Iowa as a result of the same thunderstorms, while high heat and humidity affected much of eastern North America; particularly along the eastern seaboard of the United States from New York City to the Carolinas.

== Meteorological synopsis ==
=== June 3 ===
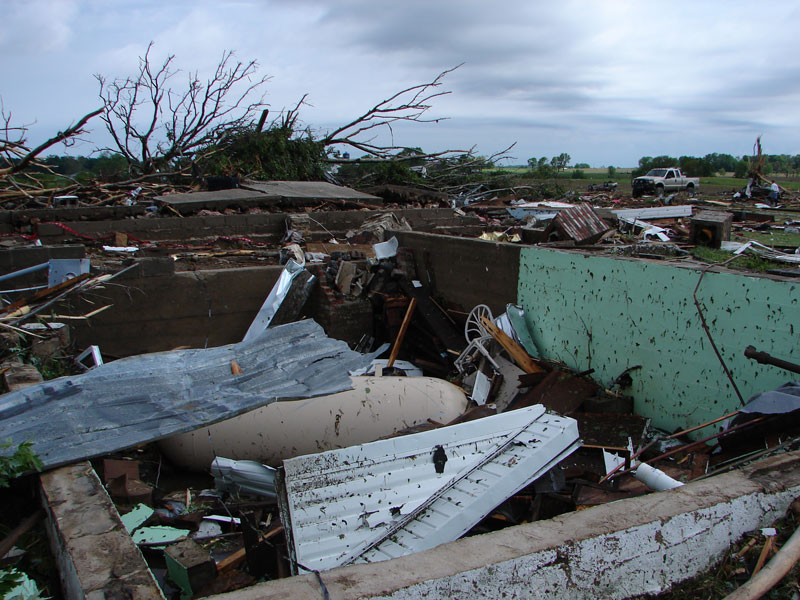
Tornado damage in Rush County, Indiana

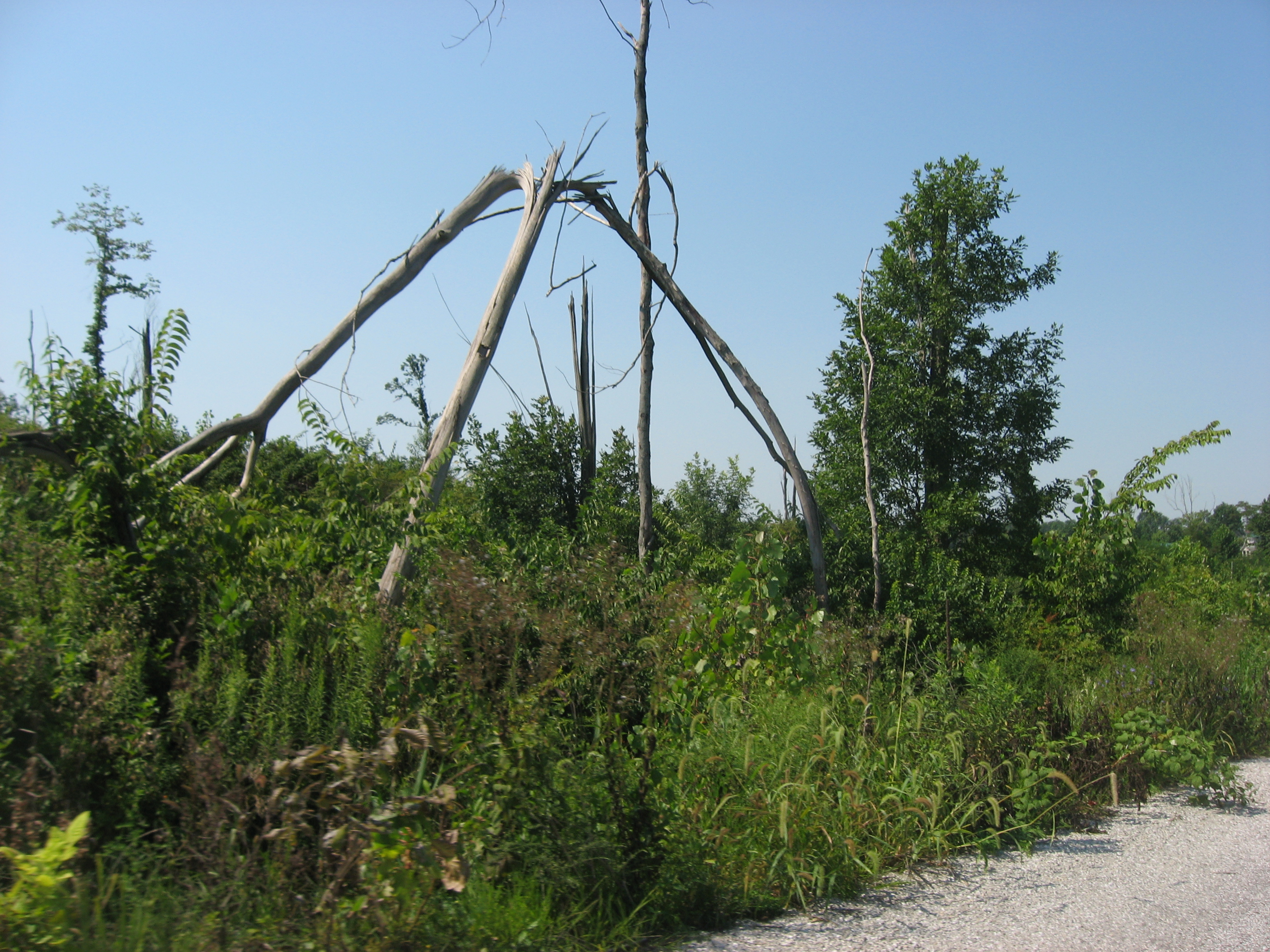
Damage in Rush County, three years after the storm

Several clusters of thunderstorms developed during the morning from eastern Nebraska across Iowa into Illinois, taking place along a warm front. The front remained over the same areas during the day, as daytime heating and southwesterly surface winds brought warm and unstable air northward, resulting in severe weather development. The presence of strong winds aloft aided in development of multiple clusters and lines of thunderstorms that produced damaging wind, hail and tornadoes across Missouri, Illinois and Indiana.

A moderate risk of severe weather was issued by the Storm Prediction Center for parts of Indiana, Kentucky, Illinois, Ohio and West Virginia on June 3, Two particular tornadoes, rated EF2 and EF3 on the Enhanced Fujita Scale, caused extensive damage across portions of central Indiana. The EF3 tornado damaged 34 structures in Rush County, of which 27 of them were in Middletown. Eight people were injured in Rush County, including a 67-year-old woman who was impaled in the chest by a large tree limb and later died as a result of her injury on August 17. A 19th century landmark covered bridge in Moscow was destroyed, as well as severe damage to dozens of homes, including some that were swept completely off the foundation. The EF2 tornado damaged 20 to 30 homes in Brown County, 40 buildings at Camp Atterbury in Johnson County and 59 buildings in Edinburgh.

=== June 4 ===
A moderate risk of severe weather was issued for northern Kansas into southern Nebraska and from eastern West Virginia through Virginia, Maryland and Delaware. An ongoing line of thunderstorms moved east across West Virginia as the atmosphere began to destabilize. The thunderstorms resulted in a threat for isolated tornadoes in eastern sections of West Virginia, Virginia, Delaware and Maryland. In the central Great Plains region, a warm front extended northeast in northeastern Kansas from a surface low in central sections of Kansas. Strong instability occurred in the vicinity of the area as a result of surface heating. An intensifying low-level jet stream broke the cap in the region and resulted in the development of thunderstorms. During the afternoon, numerous thunderstorms formed across the Mid-Atlantic States. An EF0 tornado was produced from one of the thunderstorms that impacted portions of Chesapeake Beach, tearing off sections of roof and siding from 10 to 20 single family homes. EF1 tornadoes were produced in Culpeper, Clarke and Stafford counties in Virginia. Several other EF0 and EF1 tornadoes formed throughout the Great Plains region.

=== June 5 ===
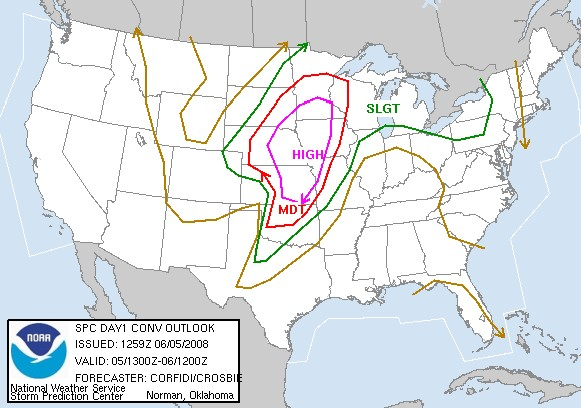
June 5, 2008 1300 UTC Day 1 Convective Outlook

A strong jet stream moved northeast across the Great Plains region and a strong surface low in western Kansas strengthened as it moved to the Nebraska-South Dakota border. Ahead of the low, very warm and moist air spread throughout the South Central United States into Nebraska, eastern sections of South Dakota and the upper Mississippi Valley. The combination of strong winds and warm and moist air created conditions favorable for strong thunderstorms. On June 5, a high risk of severe weather was issued for six different states in the Midwestern United States, with a moderate risk area surrounding the high risk area. Forecasters had warned of a potentially historic outbreak, as computer forecasting models for June 5 resembled those on June 8, 1974, when 39 tornadoes struck the southern Great Plains and killed 22 people. Wichita State University canceled evening classes because of the weather predictions. Severe weather began developing across eastern Colorado and northwestern Kansas during the morning and into the early afternoon, producing several weak tornadoes in the process. An EF1 tornado impacted a campground near Kellogg, Iowa and injured two people. Despite extremely favorable conditions, severe weather for the day was limited and the tornadoes generally caused minimal damage.

=== June 6 ===
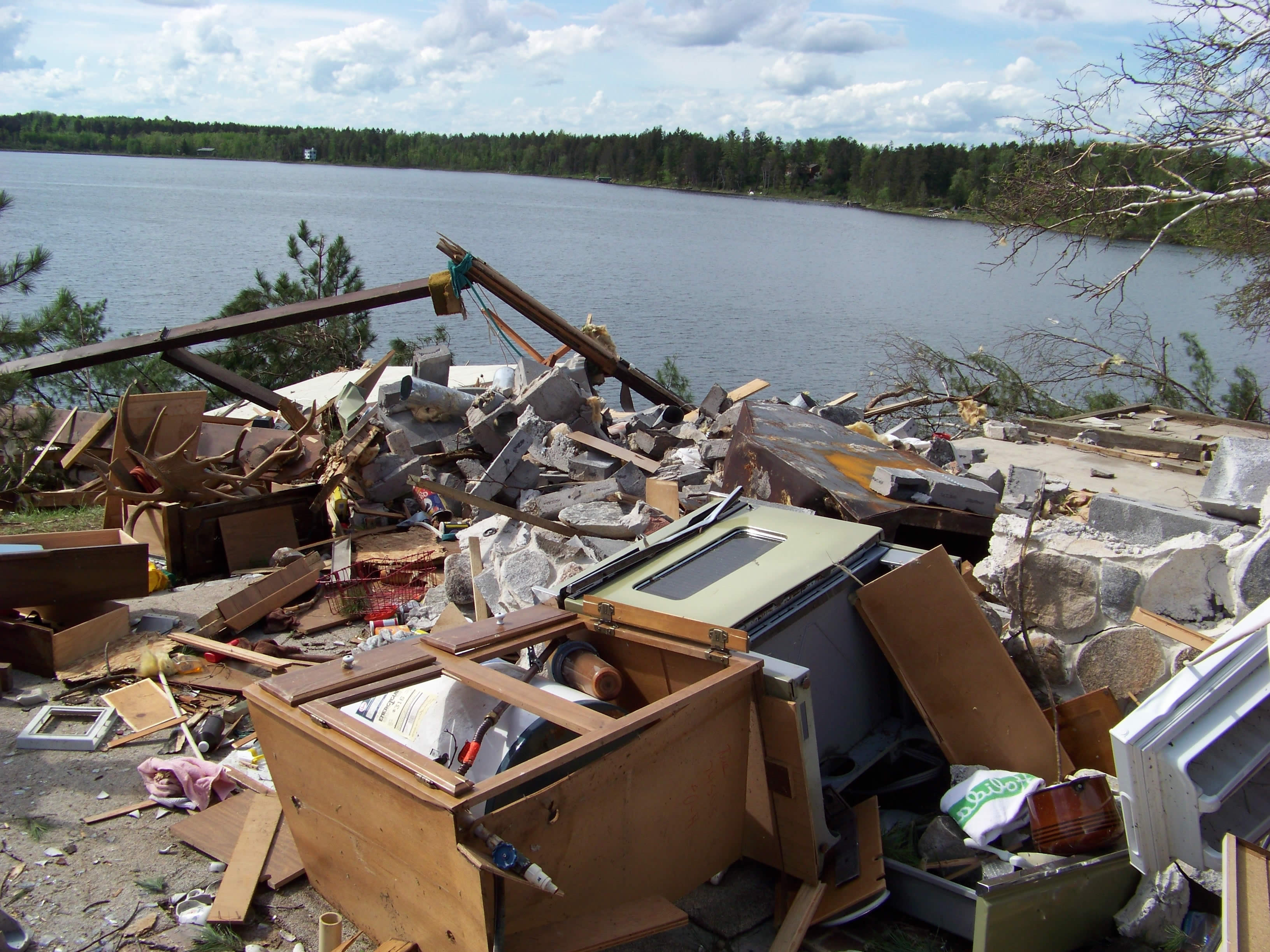
Damage caused by the EF3 Emmaville, Minnesota tornado on June 6

During the morning hours of June 6, two strong tornadoes caused damage throughout Wadena and Hubbard counties in Minnesota. The first tornado, rated EF2 on the Enhanced Fujita Scale, touched down south of Stocking Lake and downed several trees onto cabins, vehicles and storage sheds. It also toppled an irrigation system in a field north of the lake. The tornado moved to the north and expanded to its maximum width of 450 yards (410 m) and reached estimated peak winds of 130 miles per hour (210 km/h). Eight turkey barns were destroyed, killing an estimated 15 to 20 thousand turkeys. The tornado swept a home north of the area in Hubbard County off its foundation, as well as causing damage to several homes along with hundreds of acres of forest. One man working at a turkey barn was injured. The storm then produced an EF3 tornado, which eventually grew to a width of 400 yards (370 m) and reached wind speeds of 160 miles per hour (260 km/h). At Pickerel Lake, it nearly flattened every tree in the area, while destroying a trailer home, a camper, a garage and a house. At northern sections of Pickerel Lake, one home had its roof torn off and numerous trees were snapped onto other residences and farm buildings. The tornado began to lose its intensity but continued to topple trees, damage storage structures and toss debris before dissipating in Emmaville.

=== June 7–8 ===
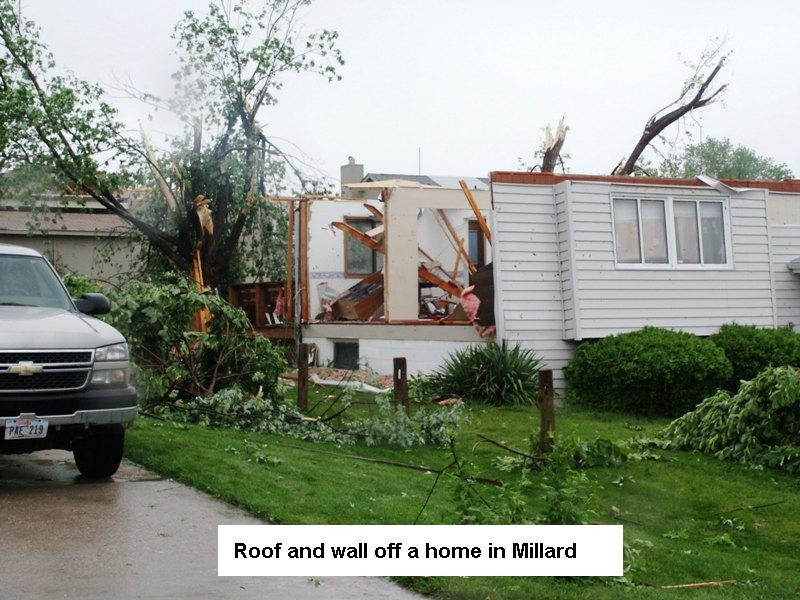
Southwest portions of Omaha, Nebraska sustained significant damage from an early-morning tornado on June 8

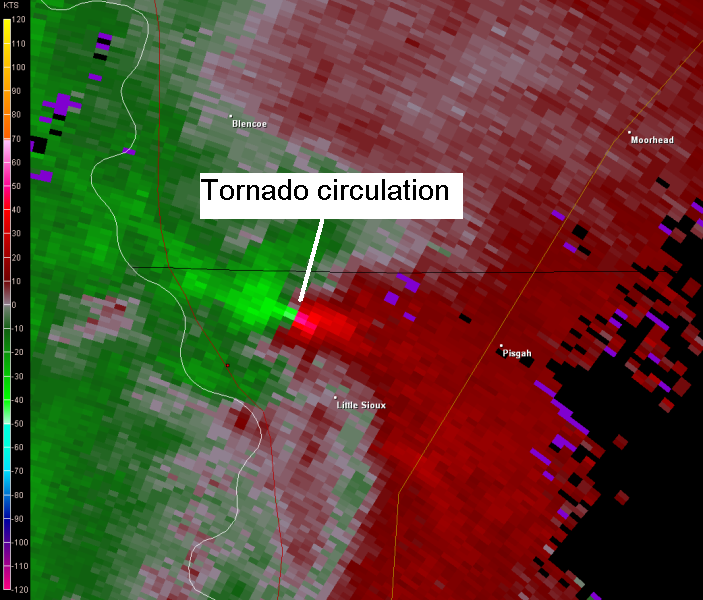
Velocity scan of the Little Sioux tornado at the time it hit the boy scout ranch

A series of impulses moved from the central Rocky Mountains into the central Great Plains. Opulent moisture formed over the Missouri and Mississippi Valleys with dew points reaching near 70 °F (21 °C). Strong low level winds over the area created favorable wind shear for supercells. During the afternoon, a supercell developed in western portions of Illinois and moved northeast reaching Lake Michigan around the Illinois-Indiana border in the Chicago metropolitan area, during which it produced eight tornadoes along its path. At 4:21 pm (2121 UTC), an EF0 tornado occurred 4 miles (6.4 km) east of Cornell in Livingston County. The tornado occurred in an open field with no damage observed. At 4:31 pm CDT (2131 UTC), an EF1 tornado touched down southwest of Dwight in Livingston County, snapping power poles and damaging trees and roofs; this tornado lifted at 4:45 pm CDT (2145 UTC). From 5:18 pm CDT (2218 UTC) to 5:46 pm CDT (2246 UTC), an EF2 tornado traveled 13.6 miles (21.9 km) across southwestern Will County and extreme northwestern Kankakee County, near Wilmington, uprooting trees, damaging homes and destroying sheds. At 5:51 pm CDT (2251 UTC), an EF2 tornado touched down for three minutes in central Will County near Wilton Center, destroying a garage and severely damaging a metal building. From 5:55 pm CDT (2255 UTC) to 6:08 pm CDT (2308 UTC), a high end EF2 tornado occurred west of Monee, leveling barns, garages, and outbuildings and damaging homes.

An EF2 tornado re-formed at 6:13 pm CDT (2313 UTC) near the intersection of Ridgeland Avenue and Dralle Road, destroying two buildings, taking down four high voltage power poles, and injuring six people as it crossed Interstate 57. The tornado moved into University Park, Illinois destroying a warehouse, completely leveling a portion of the building. As the tornado moved into Richton Park, much of Southern Cook County, including parts of Chicago were under a tornado warning. The tornado produced extensive EF2 damage to homes and commercial properties in Richton Park, an apartment building had its roof completely torn off and a car wash was severely damaged. The tornado then skirted through Park Forest uprooting trees, before dissipating near the intersection of Lincoln Highway and Western Avenue at 6:30 pm CDT (2330 UTC). At approximately 6:32 pm CDT (2332 UTC), an EF1 tornado hit Chicago Heights, causing minor damage to several homes, with two homes sustaining significant damage. At 6:49 pm CDT (2349 UTC), an EF0 tornado touched down in Lansing, damaging tree limbs.

In Wisconsin, five people suffered minor injuries after an EF2 tornado went through Columbia County. This tornado is the fifth widest in American history. Further west, a new complex of storms produced two tornadoes inside the Omaha metropolitan area during the early hours of June 8. A total of 539 homeowners reported damage from the tornadoes. Seven homes were destroyed and 21 others sustained major damage. The two tornadoes that hit the region were rated EF1 and EF2. The EF2 tornado was the strongest to strike the Omaha metropolitan area since 1975.

=== June 11 ===
A storm system moved to the northern and central Great Plains region during the day, as strong winds helped push a moist air mass northward ahead of the system. Thunderstorms developed during the afternoon ahead of a cold front from southeast South Dakota into central Kansas. Strong winds along with instability in the atmosphere created favorable conditions for supercell development with the potential to produce strong tornadoes. At approximately 6:35 pm CDT (2335 UTC) a tornado hit the Little Sioux Scout Ranch in Little Sioux, Iowa, killing four Boy Scouts after a chimney collapsed on them and injuring 48 others. The camp received a tornado warning 12 minutes before it struck. There were 93 campers and 25 staff members at the camp. The campers were between 13 and 18 years old and were attending a leadership training camp. The tornado was rated EF3 on the Enhanced Fujita Scale.

Tornadoes also caused major damage in Kansas. In Chapman, one person was killed and three others were critically injured after an EF3 tornado struck the town. About 80 percent of Chapman suffered serious damage, with minor damage occurring to the downtown area. 70 homes in Chapman were destroyed with 215 receiving damage. Two churches were demolished and the town's elementary, middle and high schools were severely damaged. Manhattan was also heavily impacted by a tornado that was rated EF4 on the Enhanced Fujita Scale. Forty-five residences in Manhattan were destroyed, as well as two mobile homes and three businesses. An additional 67 residences, three multi-family homes, one mobile home and 10 businesses suffered significant damage. Also, 75 single-family residences, three multi-family structures and 20 businesses sustained minor damage, and 637 residences, 93 multi-family structures, 20 mobile homes and 10 businesses were partially affected. An elementary school was also heavily damaged in Manhattan. There was also damage to Kansas State University, where the Wind Erosion Lab was damaged. Also suffering severe damage was the engineering complex, the Sigma Alpha Epsilon fraternity house, Waters, Call and Cardwell halls as well as Ward Hall, which houses the university's nuclear reactor. One person was also killed near the town of Soldier in Jackson County from an EF2 tornado. 32 homes were damaged in Jackson County. The southern outskirts of Salina near the junction of Interstate 135 was also hard hit by an EF3 tornado. Several homes, outbuildings, trees and power lines were damaged in the area.

== Confirmed tornadoes ==
Confirmed tornadoes by Enhanced Fujita rating
EFU	EF0	EF1	EF2	EF3	EF4	EF5	Total
0	109	63	14	5	1	0	192

- Note: Four tornadoes in Canada were rated according to the Fujita scale, but are included in the table using their corresponding number rating.

=== Little Sioux, Iowa ===
Little Sioux, Iowa
- An aerial view of the Little Sioux Scout Ranch after the tornado.

Meteorological history
- Formed: June 11, 2008, 6:25 p.m. CDT (UTC–05:00)
- Dissipated: June 11, 2008, 6:45 p.m. CDT (UTC–05:00)
- Duration: 20 minutes

EF3 tornado
- on the Enhanced Fujita scale
- Highest winds: 165 mph (266 km/h)

Overall effects
- Fatalities: 4
- Injuries: 48

Northeast of Tekamah, Nebraska, center pivot irrigation systems were flipped and trees sustained damage in the area. Fallen tree limbs damaged homes and blocked roads and some roof damage and broken windows were noted. The storm tracked northeast and crossed the Missouri River and Interstate 29 near mile marker 97, continuing into Harrison county Iowa. In Harrison county, the tornado flipped a tractor trailer. In Monona county the tornado entered the Little Sioux Scout Ranch, destroying the rangers home near the entrance of the park giving it a rating of EF3. A tornado warning was issued 12 minutes before the tornado struck the camp. It also destroyed their pickup truck sending it flying 100 yards (91 m). The storm then blew down trees and destroyed bunk houses at the camp. Four scouts: Sam Thomsen, Ben Pertzkilla, Josh Fennen and Aaron Eilerts, were killed in one bunk house when a brick chimney collapsed on them. In total 48 people were injured at the camp. The tornado continued to topple trees as it tracked into Preparation Canyon State Park. Just before it entered the park a farmstead sustained damage. The tornado hit another farmstead about 2.5 miles (4.0 km) southwest of Moorhead where trees were blown down and sheds damaged. The tornado then began to weaken and finally lifted about 2 miles (3.2 km) southwest of Moorhead.

On September 8, 2008, the Lieutenant Governor of Nebraska, Rick Sheehy presented the first–ever Be Prepared Local Hero award to the Mid-America Council Pahuk Pride Class of 2008 because of their preparation for and taking care of each other during and after the tornado struck. On September 13, 2008, those who died in the storm were presented the Spirit of the Eagle Award, a posthumous award from the Boy Scouts of America. Also on September 13, 2008, the Boy Scouts of America's National Court of Honor awarded 121 medals for heroism to Scouts and Scout leaders for their actions during the tornado: 75 Medals of Merit, 30 Heroism awards, 7 Honor Medals, and 9 Honor Medals with Crossed Palm. After the tornado struck, a safe room was built. This was because it was proven that the welcome center did not provide enough tornado safety.

=== Enterprise-Chapman, Kansas ===
Enterprise-Chapman, Kansas
- The tornado as it was striking Chapman.

Meteorological history
- Formed: June 11, 2008, 10:12 p.m. CDT (UTC–05:00)
- Dissipated: June 11, 2008, 10:27 p.m.
- Duration: 15 minutes

EF3 tornado
- on the Enhanced Fujita scale
- Highest winds: 150 mph (240 km/h)

Overall effects
- Fatalities: 1
- Injuries: 3
- Damage: $20.2 million (2008 USD)

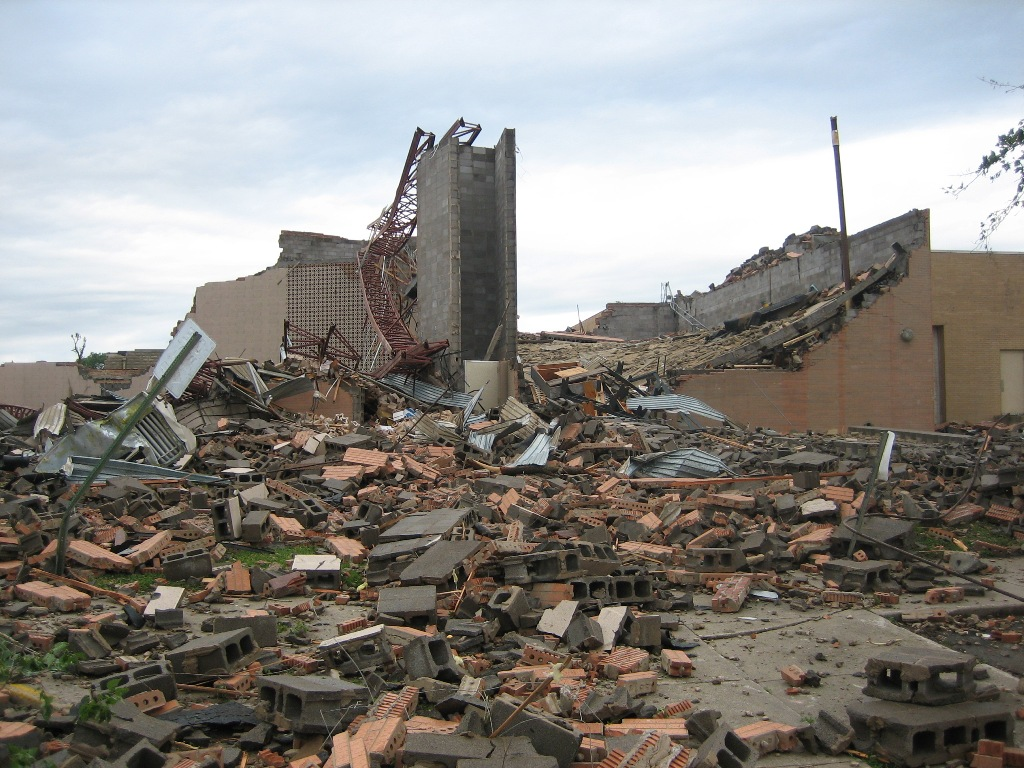
The Chapman High School in town after the tornado.

In Dickinson County, a cyclic supercell which was responsible for a prior EF3 tornado in Salina would drop this intense tornado on top of a farmstead, just northwest of Enterprise at EF0 intensity. On the property the tornado would destroy a grain bin and cause some notable tree damage. The tornado would start to travel along Lone Tree Creek, destroying a grain bin at another farmstead, as well as a center pivot and some powerline poles. After leaving the property the tornado would enter the southwestern side of the small city of Chapman and peak at mid-range EF3 intensity, with reports claiming in total 285 homes were damaged, with 70 of them completely destroyed. Two churches were demolished, while the Chapman elementary, middle and high schools, and a district office suffered severe levels of damage. Trees across town were twisted and nearly denuded. At the high school, approximately 100 people sheltered inside locker rooms as the tornado went through. For the majority, the town's business district experienced only minor levels of damage. After leaving town, the tornado would impact a third farmstead, damaging trees and outbuildings before crossing over into Geary County to the northeast. It would weaken to EF0 intensity, overturning a center pivot and causing light tree damage, before dissipating just west of Junction City. In Chapman, three-quarters of the city's buildings were damaged, while dozens of people were injured, with three of them in critical conditions. A woman, 21 year old Crystal Bishop was killed due to flying debris, and found in her yard. Debris was littered for several miles to the east of town from the tornado. The parent supercell would continue moving northeast, leaving Geary County and producing the Manhattan EF4 tornado later on into the night.

This tornado had a path length of 15.26 miles, and a width of 880 yards or half a mile wide. It lasted for 15 minutes, caused an estimated damage cost $20.2 million in Dickinson County, while no monetary losses were accounted for in Geary County. In May 2016, Chapman avoided a direct hit from a violent EF4 tornado that passed south of the small city, sparing it from a second round of devastation.

=== Manhattan, Kansas ===
Manhattan, Kansas
- The tornado as it was striking Manhattan.

Meteorological history
- Formed: June 11, 2008, 10:48 p.m. CDT (UTC–05:00)
- Dissipated: June 11, 2008, 11:03 p.m.
- Duration: 15 minutes

EF4 tornado
- on the Enhanced Fujita scale
- Highest winds: 170 mph (270 km/h)

Overall effects
- Fatalities: 0
- Injuries: 0
- Damage: $66 million (2008 USD)

After the supercell responsible for the Chapman EF3 tornado entered Riley County, this low-end EF4 tornado touched down to the southwest of Manhattan on a farmstead, and first destroyed a large machine shed, and threw a grain cart into an adjacent field. The tornado then tracked to the northeast and destroyed several homes that were in the process of being built. 15 well-built homes were completely destroyed. Nearby in the Amherst residential area, approximately 30 homes were damaged. A local newspaper reported that 45 residences in Manhattan were destroyed, 142 were damaged, and 637 were affected by the tornado. 93 apartments or duplexes, 20 mobile homes, and 10 total businesses were impacted. Thereafter, the windows at the Little Apple Honda/Toyota car dealership were blown out, and several cars on the lots were tossed. A nearby hardware store and several self-storage units were demolished. Other nearby businesses were also damaged. The Lee Elementary School was then damaged. The tornado continued toward the Kansas State University campus. However, by this point, the tornado had weakened to EF1 intensity. There, the roof was blown off a fraternity house, windows were blown out of buildings, the USDA Wind Erosion Laboratory roof was damaged, and debris from damage to the southwest was blown across the campus. Damages from the tornado are estimated to be over $66 million, with $37 million occurring on the campus of the Kansas State University. Amazingly, no one was injured by the tornado. After the tornado, students from the university were expected to help clean up debris, and alumni from the college also helped clean up tornado debris. Around a year after the event, an event opened up called “Blown Away”, which was dedicated to the 2008 tornado.

The violent tornado had a path length of 8.64 miles, and a width of 440 yards or one-quarter of a mile wide. It lasted for 15 minutes and caused high amounts of damage in the city.

== Non–tornadic events ==
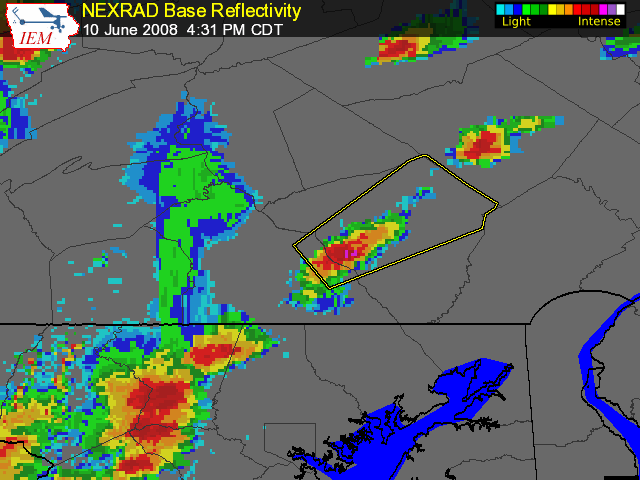
Storm over Lancaster County, Pennsylvania on June 10

On June 3, the communications tower at a courthouse in Shelbyville, Missouri was struck by lightning, damaging computers for the 911 system and the sheriff's office, radio consoles, and various other electronic equipment. In Oklahoma, high winds in excess of 80 miles per hour (130 km/h) caused major damage to five to six barns in Cherokee and destroyed one barn in Ingersoll. Three people were injured in Frontenac, Kansas after a tree was blown down on a vehicle. The next day, the inclement weather moved into the Mid-Atlantic States. A 57-year-old man was killed in Annandale, Virginia after a large tree crushed his vehicle. More than 250,000 customers lost power in Virginia. Washington Monument State Park suffered extensive damage after thunderstorms knocked out phone, electricity, and water service. Fallen trees and branches blocked the main road and the hiking trail to the monument in several places. The museum and water treatment buildings were severely damaged, and as a result, the park was closed for two weeks. A total 70 severe thunderstorm, marine, and tornado warnings were issued in the Baltimore/Washington region. In Bloomington, Indiana, two people had lightning strikes near them and were taken to the hospital for lighting related injuries. The cell phone of another individual was struck while the person was talking on the phone and was also taken to the hospital for treatment.

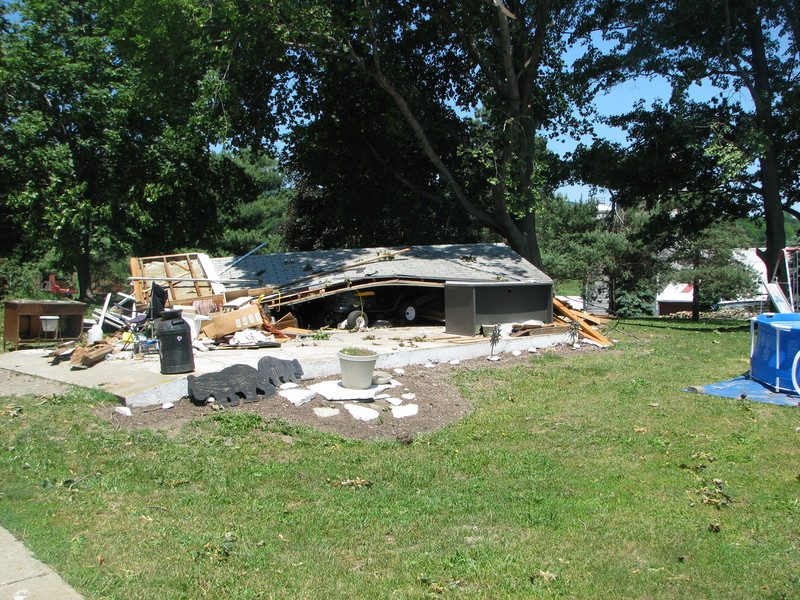
A small garage destroyed by high winds in Bradford County, Pennsylvania

On June 5, a storm system caused damage throughout the Great Plains. The most substantial damage occurred in Altus, Oklahoma, where 179 homes sustained some form of damage, with two destroyed, five with major damage, 43 with minor damage and 129 affected. Seventeen businesses were damaged, with two destroyed, four with major damage and eight with minor damage. A school in Mulvane, Kansas had roof damage and there was significant roof damage to the terminal building at an airport near Winfield. In Lawrence, The Wakarusa Music and Camping Festival shut down while the storm passed through. On June 8, thunderstorms affected areas across the Great Lakes region. Two people were killed in Ottawa County, Michigan due to the straight-line winds that toppled trees; one onto a pedestrian and another onto a car. In Eaton County, a woman was killed by winds which blew a large trailer on to her. Over 300,000 people in Michigan were left without power due to the storm.

On June 10, a powerful squall line of thunderstorms with embedded supercells developed across New York and moved northeast through parts of northern New England and Quebec. Particularly hard hit was the Montreal region and its southern suburbs including Longueuil, Châteauguay, Brossard and Saint-Jean-sur-Richelieu. Barns were reported damaged and other structures sustained roof and siding damage; particularly in the Saint-Blaise-sur-Richelieu area where one home was pushed from its foundation. In Sainte-Catherine, the roof of an office was blown into a nearby residence punching a large hole on the back wall. On Montreal's Champlain Bridge, eight tractor trailers were overturned forcing the closure of the entire bridge in both directions. In addition, a window washing platform tumbled from a high rise building in downtown Montreal. The workers were able to get inside.

Severe thunderstorms also affected the Saint-Hyacinthe, Sherbrooke, Trois-Rivières and Quebec City where winds as strong as 68 miles per hour (109 km/h) were reported with locally higher gusts while hail from golf ball to baseball size were reported in Mont-Saint-Hilaire and Belœil breaking windows from homes and vehicles. The roof of a 65 unit apartment complex in Sainte-Foy was heavily damaged. The Quebec Bridge linking the city to the suburb of Levis was also temporarily shut down because of a collapsed scaffolding. About 300,000 Hydro-Québec customers across the province lost power, particularly in the Quebec City, Montérégie and Montreal regions with outages occurring in the Eastern Townships and Mauricie regions. Schools in some areas were closed on June 11 due to the power outages. The tractor trailer accidents resulted in two minor injuries during the storms. According to a report from the Insurance Bureau of Canada, insured damage amounts were estimated at $56 million (2008 CAD), and up to 16,000 insurance claims were filed for damage to homes and automobiles.

The severe weather extended south into the Eastern Seaboard of the United States where it ended a prolonged period of intense heat. Temperatures had reached the mid to upper 90s °F (mid 30s °C) for several days in a row, with some areas exceeding 100 °F (38 °C). About 150,000 customers in New Jersey, 140,000 in Pennsylvania and 50,000 in northern New York lost power. One person was killed in Lewis County, New York by fallen trees during the storm.

=== Flooding ===
The same series of systems contributed to a significant flooding event in many parts of the Midwest. Several counties in this region in Iowa, Illinois and Wisconsin were declared disaster areas. Over 10 inches (25 cm) fell in areas over the course of a week, and in Indiana some rivers approached levels similar to flooding in 1913 which killed 200 people. In Franklin, Indiana, water at one point reached the first level of the area hospital, and buildings at Franklin College were damaged. Flooding was reported also in Columbus, Helmsburg and Terre Haute, Indiana. US Coast Guard units were deployed in assistance for rescue efforts. Parts of Interstate 65 and U.S. Route 31 were temporarily shut down. Thirty thousand people in Indiana lost power during the storms, and several counties filed disaster declarations.

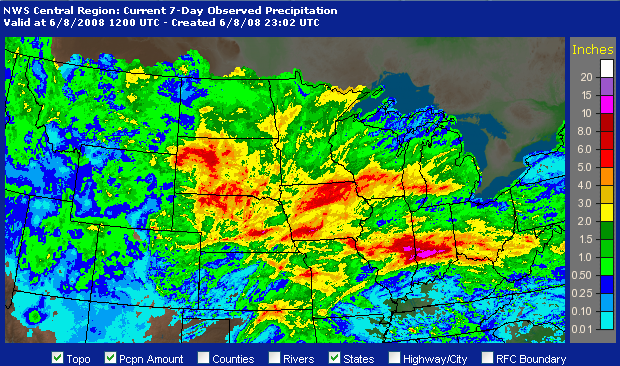
Early June rainfall estimates over the Central U.S.

Beginning on June 8, flooding also started occurring across parts of Iowa following several round of thunderstorms and heavy rains. In Parkersburg, Iowa, a levee burst, flooding three nearby highways. In New Hartford, which was also hit by the same tornado, water gushed over a levee forcing the evacuation of 650 people. The flood waters also damaged a water treatment plant leaving Mason City without drinking water. Up to 5 inches (13 cm) of rain fell in parts of the state. Mandatory evacuations were also made in Cedar Falls and Waterloo. Several entire blocks in Cedar Rapids were under water (which was at times as high as stop signs) after the Cedar River overflowed its banks. Flooding later affected the Iowa City area along the Iowa River where 20 buildings on the University of Iowa campus were affected. Many other towns across the state became flooded as well as the rising water levels slowly made their way into the Mississippi River across southeastern Iowa, western Illinois and northeastern Missouri.

Flooding was also reported north of Mason City in southeastern Minnesota, where several inches of rain closed roads and forced evacuations. Gays Mills, Wisconsin was evacuated for the second time in ten months when the Kickapoo River flooded the town. These same areas were also affected by the 2007 Midwest flooding. From June 3 to June 11 eight people were killed due to flooding; three in Indiana, three in Michigan, and one in Illinois and Minnesota.

== See also ==
- Weather of 2008
- List of North American tornadoes and tornado outbreaks
- List of F4 and EF4 tornadoes
  - List of F4 and EF4 tornadoes (2000–2009)
