= Moscow, Indiana =

- Unincorporated community
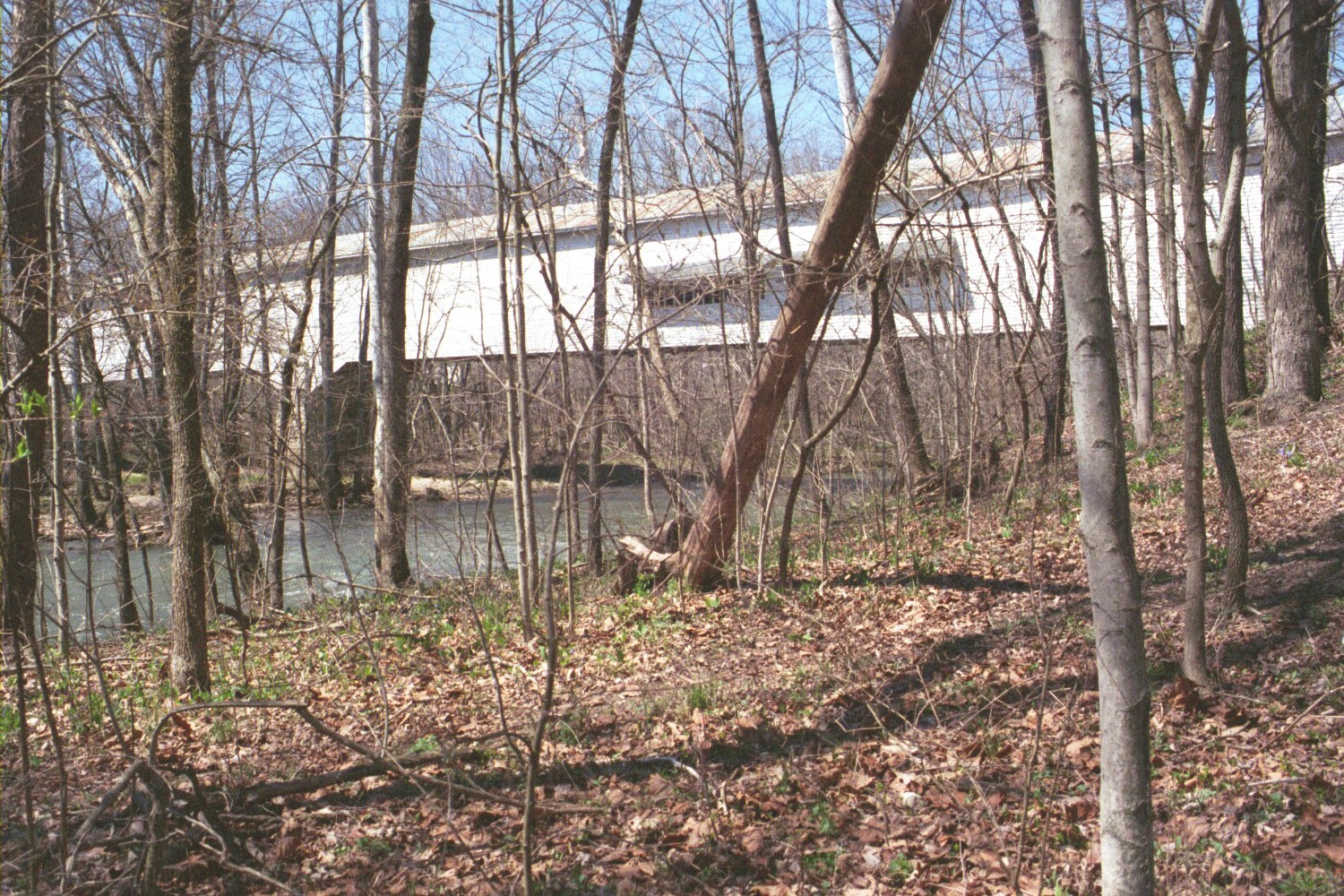
- Moscow Covered Bridge, Rush County

- Location within Indiana Location within the United States
- Coordinates: 39°29′07″N 85°33′24″W
- Country: United States
- State: Indiana
- County: Rush
- Township: Orange
- Elevation: 889 ft (271 m)
- Time zone: UTC-5 (Eastern (EST))
  - Summer (DST): UTC-4 (EDT)
- ZIP code: 46156
- Area code: 765
- FIPS code: 18-51228
- GNIS feature ID: 439481

Moscow is an unincorporated community in Orange Township, Rush County, in the U.S. state of Indiana.

== History ==
Moscow was laid out in 1832. The community's name most likely was a transfer from Moscow, Russia. A post office was established at Moscow in 1827, and remained in operation until it was discontinued in 1907.

The town was struck on June 3, 2008, by an EF3 tornado which destroyed its landmark 19th-century Moscow Covered Bridge over the Big Flatrock river.
