= Indiana Soldiers' and Sailors' Children's Home =

- 10892 N. SR. 140; Knightstown, IN 46148

Information
- Type: Non Public high school
- Established: 1865
- Closed: 2009
- School district: Rush County Schools
- Superintendent: Paul Wilkinson
- Principal: Kevin Porter
- Grades: K–12
- Colors: Royal Blue and White
- Nickname: Tigers
- Publication: The Home Journal

- Indiana Soldiers' and Sailors' Children's Home
- U.S. National Register of Historic Places
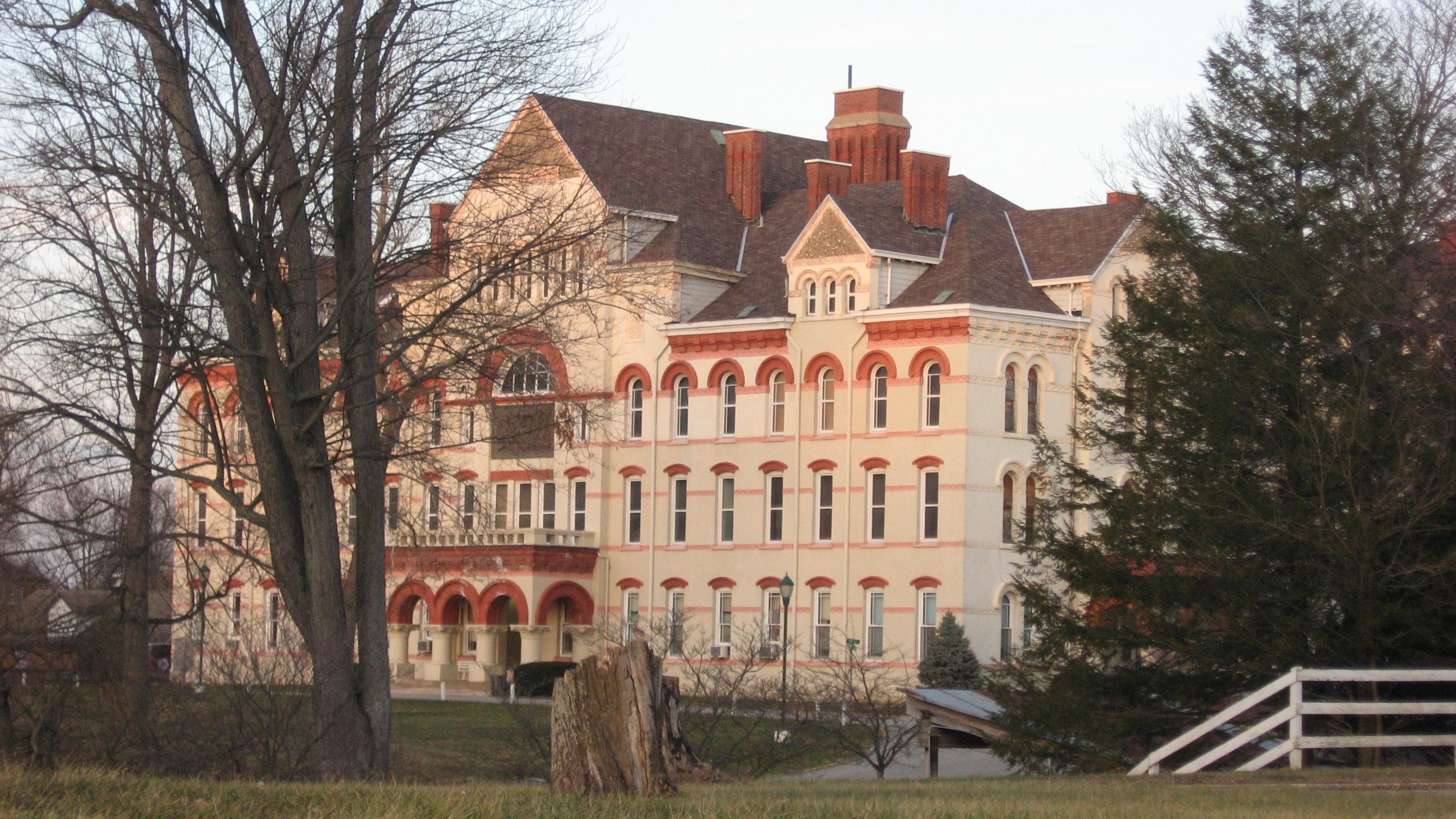
- Front of the administration building

- Location within Indiana Location within the United States
- Location: 10892 N. State Road 140
- Nearest city: Knightstown
- Coordinates: 39°46′0″N 85°31′0″W
- Built: 1878
- Architect: John A. Hasecoster, Joe Wildermuth, McGuire & Shook
- NRHP reference No.: 11000916
- Added to NRHP: December 20, 2011

The Indiana Soldiers' and Sailors' Children's Home (ISSCH) was a residential and educational facility near Knightstown, Indiana.

== History ==
The home was founded in 1865 by Governor of Indiana Oliver Morton and others and was for veterans of the American Civil War. Two years later, it came under the control of the State of Indiana and was known under a variety of names, including "Soldiers's Orphan's Home", "Indiana Soldier's and Seamen's Home", "Indiana Soldiers' Orphans' Home", and Soldiers' and Sailors' Orphans' Home". The name was then changed in the 1929 to "Indiana Soldiers' and Sailors' Children's Home", which is retained until its closing in 2009. During the 1890s, due to dwindling number of Civil War orphans, the Indiana law establishing the Home was amended to admit any student who had a close relative such as a parent, aunt, uncle, or grandparent who served in the military services of the United States.

The "Home", as it was called by students who attended there, was sometimes a place for "at-risk" children. It was not only for "at-risk" children; it was also a tool for young people to have freedom from independent living in a boarding school environment. There were 13 living facilities available. Students lived in divisions that had different amounts of kids. The girls stayed on one side of the lake, and the boys on the other side. Students could earn money starting at the age of 14 by working in the Barn, Cafeteria, the radio station, and barber shop, among other things.

The Indiana Soldiers' and Sailors' Children's Home was home to Morton Memorial Schools (the school was K–12 grade). Each classroom size was between 20 and 30 students, so the students received the individual attention needed for them to succeed. The school was on a core 40 system. The school offered vocational programs which let students study trades such as building trades, culinary art, broadcast, business and veterinarian science. Students were able to partake in JROTC. While in JROTC, students could do Raiders, Rifle team, MP Usher, and Color Guard. The graduating Class of 2007 had 25 graduating seniors, while the graduating Class of 2008 had 11 graduating seniors. Once a student graduated he or she had the option to go to any public college in Indiana, tuition free.

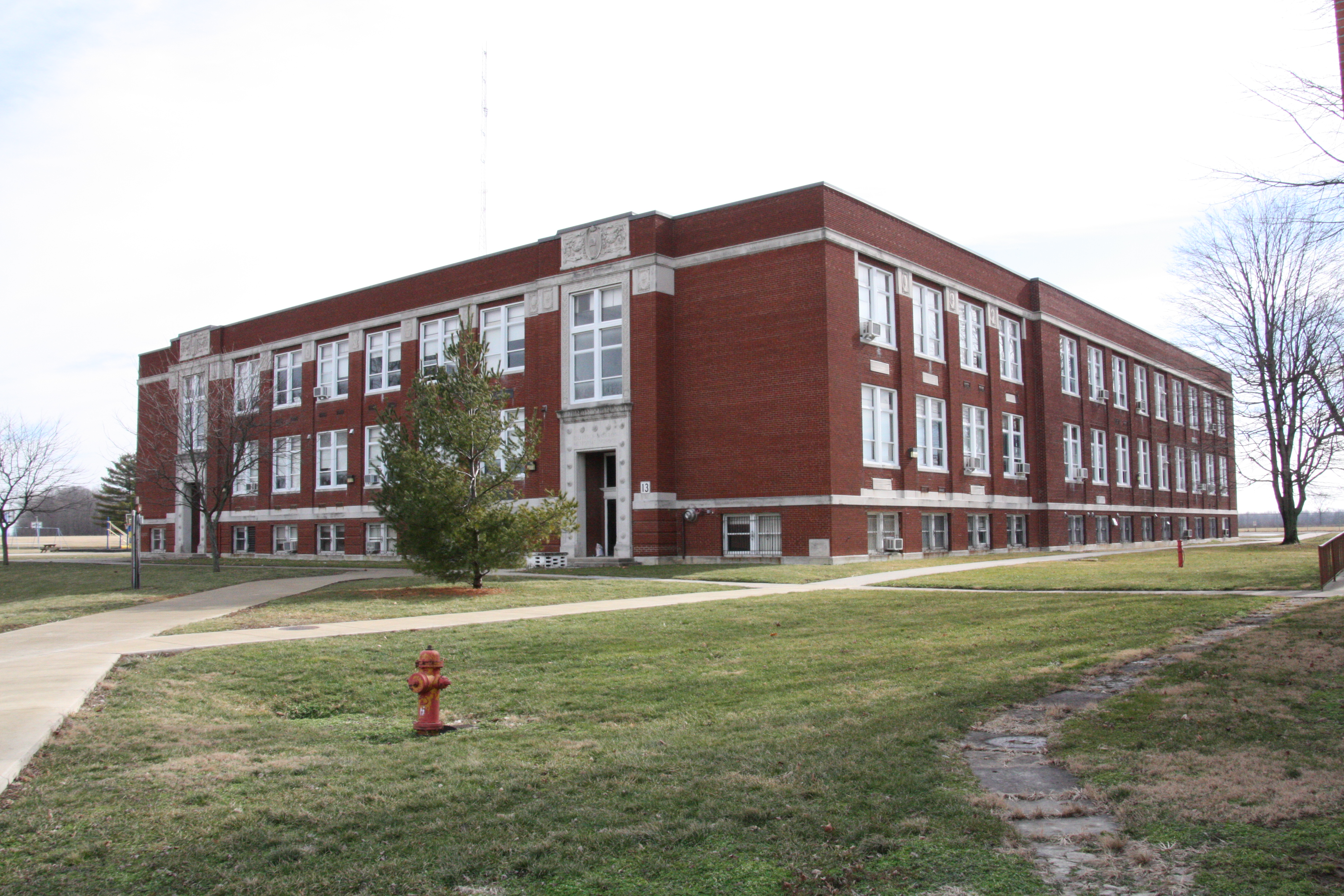
Morton School (1928, addition 1936), McGuire and Shook architects

The stated mission of ISSCH was "to be a safe mentoring community where Indiana's at-risk youth are given opportunities to excel".

== Endangered status ==
In 2009, the Home's complex of buildings was listed on the Indiana Landmarks "10 Most Endangered" list due to the Home's architectural significance and the uncertainty of its future viability. The state announced that following the 2009 graduation on 23 May 2009, the Home would be closed and the remaining students dispersed to public schools.

At the end of 2011, the entire Home complex was listed on the National Register of Historic Places. Thirty-one of the fifty-one buildings in the complex qualified as contributing properties, as did the cemetery and the entire grounds. The majority of the non-contributing buildings are small semi-permanent structures; enough large historic buildings remain that the property's sense of space and place is not diminished.

== Closure ==
Following a bipartisan effort to keep the Indiana Soldiers' and Sailors' Children's Home open, Governor Mitch Daniels closed the Home and removed it from the budget, effectively removing funding from the Home. The land was turned over to the Indiana National Guard for use as the Hoosier Youth ChalleNGe Academy (HYCA) in 2009. HYCA is a quasi-residential program designed to provide structure and life skills to students aged 16 to 18 who have dropped out of high school.

== Residents ==
- Monte Blue
