= Florida Township, Parke County, Indiana =

Florida Township
- Township
- Location in Parke County
- Coordinates: 39°39′02″N 87°18′59″W
- Country: United States
- State: Indiana
- County: Parke

Government
  - Type: Indiana township

Area
  - Total: 48.47 sq mi (125.5 km^{2})
  - Land: 48.17 sq mi (124.8 km^{2})
  - Water: 0.3 sq mi (0.78 km^{2}) 0.62%
- Elevation: 614 ft (187 m)

Population (2020)
  - Total: 2,235
  - Density: 46.40/sq mi (17.91/km^{2})
- Time zone: UTC-5 (Eastern (EST))
  - Summer (DST): UTC-4 (EDT)
- ZIP codes: 47862, 47872, 47874
- Area code: 765
- GNIS feature ID: 453297

Florida Township is one of thirteen townships in Parke County, Indiana, United States. As of the 2020 census, its population was 2,235 and it contained 1,059 housing units.

Historical population
Census	Pop.	Note	%±
1890	3,170		—
1900	3,466		9.3%
1910	3,200		−7.7%
1920	2,627		−17.9%
1930	2,189		−16.7%
1940	2,231		1.9%
1950	2,024		−9.3%
1960	2,007		−0.8%
1970	2,433		21.2%
1980	2,632		8.2%
1990	2,480		−5.8%
2000	2,500		0.8%
2010	2,378		−4.9%
2020	2,235		−6.0%
Source: US Decennial Census

== History ==
Florida Township was established in 1821, the same year the county was created, though it was first settled circa 1816. It was named after a township in the state of New York, from which pioneer David Loree had emigrated.

The Harry Evans Covered Bridge, Roseville Covered Bridge, Thorpe Ford Covered Bridge, and Zacke Cox Covered Bridge were listed on the National Register of Historic Places in 1978.

== Geography ==
According to the 2010 census, the township has a total area of 48.47 square miles (125.5 km^{2}), of which 48.17 square miles (124.8 km^{2}) (or 99.38%) is land and 0.3 square miles (0.78 km^{2}) (or 0.62%) is water.

=== Cities, towns, villages ===
- Rosedale

=== Unincorporated towns ===
- Coxville at 39.651983°N 87.294461°W
- Hudnut at 39.659482°N 87.376963°W
- Jessup at 39.657262°N 87.256683°W
- Lyford at 39.650038°N 87.370851°W
- Numa at 39.630871°N 87.370296°W
- West Atherton at 39.608926°N 87.370852°W

(This list is based on USGS data and may include former settlements.)

=== Cemeteries ===
The township contains these five cemeteries: Adams, Bound, Mount Pleasant, Orlea and Rukes.

=== Major highways ===
- U.S. Route 41

=== Airports and landing strips ===
- Heaton Private Airport

== School districts ==
- Southwest Parke Community School Corporation

== Political districts ==
- State House District 42
- State Senate District 38
