= Chauncey Rose =

American businessman

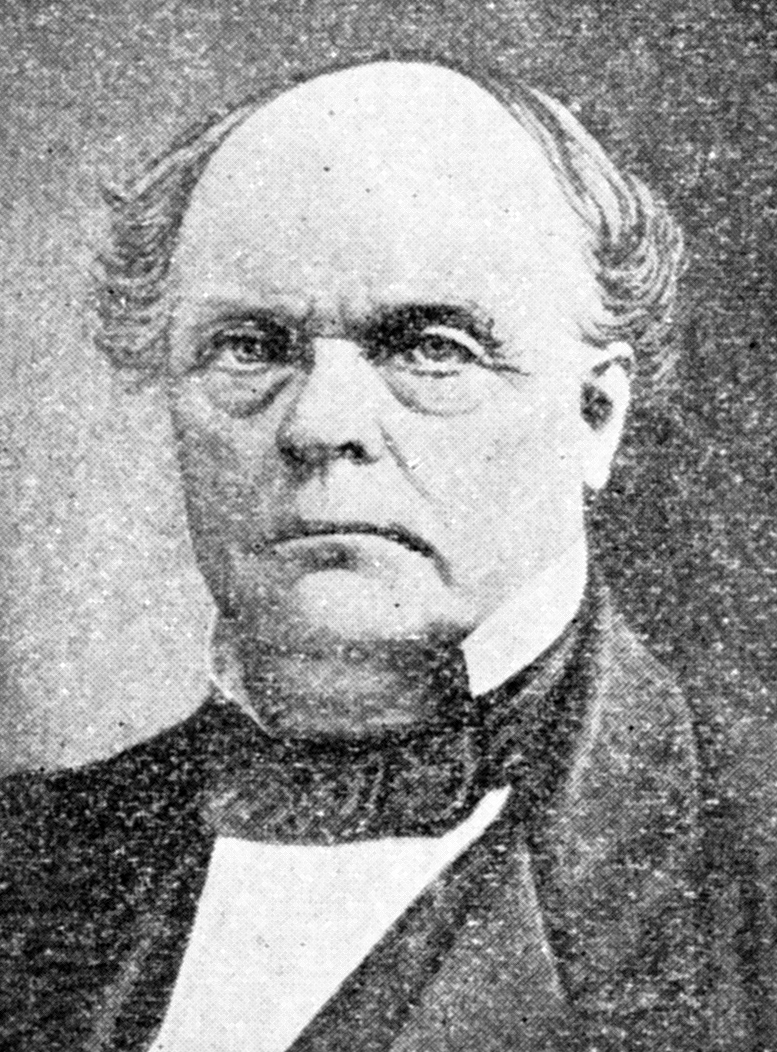
- Rose from Who-When-What Book, published in 1900
- Born: December 24, 1794; Wethersfield, Connecticut, United States
- Died: August 13, 1877 (aged 82); Terre Haute, Indiana
- Occupation: Businessman
- Known for: Significant impact on railroad building in the United States

Chauncey Rose (December 24, 1794 – August 13, 1877) was an American businessman during the 19th century. He became known as the railroad king for his enthusiastic support of railroad development in the United States during the 19th century.

== Early life ==
Chauncey Rose was born in Wethersfield, Connecticut, to Scottish immigrants on December 24, 1794. Chauncey was one of eight children, all of whom died childless. Two of his brothers, George and John, went on to successful business careers in Charleston, South Carolina, and New York City, respectively.

Rose was educated in the common schools of his Connecticut district, and at the age of 23 headed west to the states of Indiana, Illinois, Kentucky, Tennessee and Alabama to find a suitable place to enter into business. He decided upon western Indiana and settled in Rosedale, then known as Dotyville, in Parke County in 1819, where he first turned his attention to milling, building his first mill in Coxville just outside Rosedale. As his revenue grew, Rose expanded into other investment realms in nearby Terre Haute in Vigo County, which was developing into the commerce center of the region.

Rose was instrumental in getting the U.S. Army Corps of Engineers under Major Cornelius A. Ogden, supervisors of the construction the Cumberland Road, to relocate their headquarters from Indianapolis to Terre Haute. When Terre Haute was awarded a district branch of the Second State Bank of Indiana in 1834, Rose furnished a facility in which the bank could operate while awaiting construction of the bank branch. This provided Major Ogden with a secure place to issue payroll. Rose then constructed a fine hotel east of the village, called The Prairie House, so that Ogden and other West Point graduates associated the Corps of Engineers would have a superb residence. This hotel later became the first Terre Haute House, so renamed by Rose in 1855.

In 1865 Chauncey Rose decided to have an artesian well drilled in the court of Terre Haute House. They struck oil at 1629 ft. It was the first oil well in Indiana. Due to odor the well was plugged. Other drilling was unsuccessful until they drilled nearby. He sold Terre Haute House in 1866.

== Business success ==
Following a six-year stretch overseeing milling operations in Parke County, Rose moved back to Terre Haute to expand his businesses and became quite successful. His profits were in turn reinvested in real estate, and he amassed an even larger fortune, some of which he subsequently invested in railroads. His real estate was in Vigo and Sullivan Counties mostly coal lands and city lots in the Chauncy Rose addition in Terre Haute. In 1847, Rose was the principal founder of the Terre Haute & Richmond Railroad. He was elected President of the company at the shareholders meeting held in Greencastle, IN on May 10, 1848. It was renamed the Terre Haute & Indianapolis Railroad in 1865. He also aided others, including William D. Griswold and Josephus Collett, to establish other railroads.

== Railroad King ==
Rose has been called the railroad king. He was an enthusiastic supporter of railroads. The tariff of 1842 had a significant impact on railroad building. The duty of $17/ton of hammered bar iron and $25/ton of rolled bar iron raised costs by 50 to 80%. The Walker tariff of 1846 reduced the duty to 30% and set off a railroad building boom in the 1850s.

Rose went to the railroad convention at Indianapolis on May 12, 1847. It was attended by representatives from Ohio, Indiana, Illinois, and Missouri. The convention recommended a railroad connecting St. Louis and Cincinnati. The Terre Haute & Richmond Railroad had been chartered by the Indiana state legislature on January 26, 1847. It was to construct a railroad across Indiana from Terre Haute to Richmond through Indianapolis roughly following the route of the National Road. At the time the only railroad in Indiana was the Madison and Indianapolis Railroad completed September, 1847.

Rose's brother John helped raise funds for the railroad but most funds came from Boston from a man named Wells. Shareholders of the Terre Haute & Richmond Railroad met in Greencastle, Indiana, on May 10, 1848. Chauncey Rose was elected president. He was authorized to hire an engineer to survey the route from Terre Haute to Greencastle. Construction began Spring 1851 from both Terre Haute and Indianapolis. Rails were brought up the Wabash River by steamboat to Terre Haute.

Rose bought four locomotives from Hinkley Locomotive Works, Boston Machine Works, for use in construction. They traveled by the New York Central precursor from Albany to Buffalo. To Toledo by water and by the Wabash & Erie Canal to Terre Haute. The engines for Indianapolis went from Defiance, Ohio, to Cincinnati probably by the Miami and Erie Canal, then to Madison, and up the incline to Indianapolis by railroad. The line was completed in March, 1852. Three locomotives were acquired from Taunton Locomotive Manufacturing Company and passenger coaches from Columbus, OH. The trip from Terre Haute to Indianapolis was about four hours and charged $0.05/mi or $3.65 one way. Rose retired as President after a few years and moved to the Vincennes road and Rockville road.

In 1851, the Terre Haute & Richmond was terminated in Indianapolis. The section from Indianapolis to Richmond was built as the Indiana Central Railroad. It was completed to the state line in October, 1853. The Terre Haute & Richmond changed its name to Terre Haute & Indianapolis Railroad.

The Indianapolis & Bellefontaine Railroad or "Bee Line" was the first connection from Indianapolis to eastern railroads. It was chartered February 17, 1848, and completed to Union City in December, 1852. It became part of the Big Four and later the New York Central Railroad. Bee Line was formed officially on May 16, 1868; the Big Four in June, 1889. The Big Four is the Cleveland, Cincinnati, Chicago and St. Louis Railway.

Rose was President of the Terre Haute & Indianapolis when the Union Railway was organized in Indianapolis (1848) and Union Depot was built, 1853. Rose is named on a plaque in Union Station as one of the men who put the Union Railway together.

The TH&I was the most profitable of Indiana's railroads. The Vincennes railroad was originally chartered as the Evansville & Illinois to connect with the Ohio & Mississippi Railroad at Olney, later at Vincennes January 21, 1849. It was extended to Terre Haute, Rockville, and Crawfordsville. The section from Vincennes to Terre Haute, 58 miles built under WD Griswold and Chauncey Rose, was opened to through traffic on November 23, 1853 and completed in 1854. Rose donated his stock in the TH&I to the Evansville and Crawfordsville Railroad to finance its construction.

The Ohio & Mississippi Railroad was chartered to build from Illinoistown (East St. Louis) across Illinois to Vincennes, Indiana, and then on to Cincinnati, to connect with the Baltimore and Ohio Railroad. It was completed to Vincennes on July 5, 1855; to Cincinnati in April, 1857.

The western portion of the Indianapolis railroad system should have been the Vandalia route from Terre Haute to Illinoistown, following the route of the National Road. The Illinois state legislature had a "home policy" that promoted Chicago railroads and sought to block St. Louis' access to eastern railroads. They refused to charter the Vandalia route, but instead chartered the Terre Haute & Alton Railroad and the Ohio & Mississippi. The Terre Haute & Alton was chartered in January, 1851. Simeon Ryder of Alton got the charter after a seven year struggle. He served as President. The Belleville & Illinoistown Railroad was chartered in June 1853. It built north to connect with the Terre Haute & Alton at Wood River, IL. This gave the TH&A access to Illinoistown across from St. Louis. The TH&A was completed in October, 1855. The TH&A consolidated with the B&I in February, 1854. The name was changed to the St. Louis, Alton & Terre Haute Railroad. Rose controlled the stock of the TH&A.

For a while both New York Central and Pennsylvania Railroads used the TH&I and TH&A lines for connection to Illinoistown. In 1866 and 1867, the Bee Line offered to buy the TH&I, but Rose preferred the Indiana Central. In quick order the Bee Line leased the TH&A (September 11, 1867), the Panhandle Line (Pennsylvania RR interests) decided to build the Vandalia Line, and a collection of railroads decided to build a competing line between Terre Haute and Indianapolis following the northern route through Danville and Greenville. In 1857, Illinois finally agreed to charter the Vandalia Line but construction was delayed by the Panic of 1857 and the Civil War. Vandalia when completed became the major St. Louis to New York City route. It was 138 miles including 127 miles without a curve.

The Terre Haute & Richmond Railroad opened the line from Indianapolis west to Terre Haute in 1852. The line from East St. Louis east to Terre Haute was opened in 1868, 1869, and 1870 by the St. Louis, Vandalia & Terre Haute Railroad (in Illinois) and the Terre Haute & Indianapolis Railroad, the Terre Haute & Richmond's successor (in Indiana). The entire line was operated by the Terre Haute & Indianapolis under lease until 1905, when the two companies were merged into the Vandalia Railroad part of the Pennsylvania Main Line, Pittsburgh to St. Louis

In 1976, both the New York Central and the Pennsylvania were taken into Conrail. Conrail used the Vandalia route between St. Louis and Terre Haute and the New York Central line between Terre Haute and Indianapolis. Both had fewer curves than the lines built by Rose and associates in the early days of railroading. The lines are now owned by CSX.

The Evansville-Terre Haute line was eventually extended to Chicago through Danville, Illinois, as the Chicago & Eastern Illinois, C&EI. Rose and Josephus Collett were subscribers. The C&EI was acquired by the Missouri Pacific Railroad in May, 1967, giving it access to Chicago. As part of the merger agreement, it sold the Evansville line to the Louisville & Nashville in 1969. It is now owned by CSX.

The final section of the Indiana railroad plan was the Indianapolis & Cincinnati. It was later extended to Lafayette and Chicago and became part of the Big Four. It was initially chartered as the Rushville & Lawrenceburg. The name was changed to Lawrenceburg & Upper Mississippi April 1, 1850. Rails were on the way, June 1, 1852. Trains were running November 1, 1853. The name changed to the Indianapolis & Cincinnati on October 4, 1853.

This was the glory days of railroading. Railroads was the growth industry of the day almost like Silicon Valley is today. The industry was big business for investors, lawyers, and state legislatures. T-rail was in use replacing flat iron, but gauge remained an issue. Most Indiana railroads were built at 4 ft 8-1/2 in, said to be Pennsylvania gauge. Ohio railroads were 4 ft 10 in causing problems for the Bee Line. The Ohio & Mississippi was built at 6 ft gauge.

Charters in Indiana contained little discussed provisions. Subscriptions to stock were sold to the public. In Indiana, farmers often met subscription requirements by donating land, working to build the railroad, or contributing materials like firewood or railroad ties. Provisions usually required that construction begin within five years and be completed within fifteen years. Profits were capped. If over 15%, the surplus went to Indiana's common school fund. After a railroad earned its construction cost and a reasonable return, the state could regulate its tolls. And after a specified time, often 25 to 60 years, the state could buy the railroad for its construction cost.

== Philanthropy ==
Upon the death of his brother John, Chauncey learned that he was the sole heir to an estate worth $1,600,000. Concerned that the laws of New York would prevent the proper fulfillment of his brother’s wishes, Chauncey instituted legal proceedings and, after six years of court battles, won the right to disperse his brother’s estate. Chauncey distributed his brother’s money, totaling $1,500,000 to various charities, mostly in the New York area.

Rose was equally generous with his money in Terre Haute, where his philanthropic activities were reported in an 1875 New York Times article to have exceeded $2,000,000 in currency of that day. Among his numerous benefactors were the Providence Hospital, the Free Dispensary and the Rose Orphan Asylum, to whom he endowed enough money to ensure it would remain permanent. He donated to Wabash College in Crawfordsville, IN. He donated $73,000 to secure the location of the State Normal School, now Indiana State University in Terre Haute.

Rose also contributed enough money to build and endow the Rose Polytechnic Institute (now the Rose-Hulman Institute of Technology). The cornerstone for the college was laid on September 11, 1875, but it did not begin operations until March 5, 1883, long after Rose's death. It remains to this day one of the few colleges solely dedicated to science and engineering. Rose organized it as the Terre Haute School of Industrial Sciences with an initial endowment of $500,000, so that “this institution has a productive capital, exclusive of buildings”.

Significantly, Rose intended none of the institutions funded or founded by him, save the incorporated name of Rosedale to bear his name. Other name ties resulting from posthumous commemorative changes by his grateful recipients.

== Death ==
Rose died in Terre Haute, Indiana on August 13, 1877. His will is published.

== Bibliography ==
- (1877). "A Dead Millionaire." Chicago Daily Tribune. August 22.
- (1877). "Death of Chauncey Rose." The New York Times. August 14.
- Logan, Esaray and William Cronin (1922). History of Indiana From Its Exploration to 1922. Dayton: Dayton Historical Publishing Company.
- US Writers Program. Indiana: A Guide to the Hoosier State. New York: Oxford University Press.
- (1889). "The Rose Polytechnic Institute." Science February 15.
- (1875). "Benefactions of Mr. Chauncey Rose of Indiana, Upwards of $2,000,000 Given Away in Fifteen Years." The New York Times. October 11.
