= Thorpe Ford Covered Bridge =

Place in Indiana listed on National Register of Historic Places

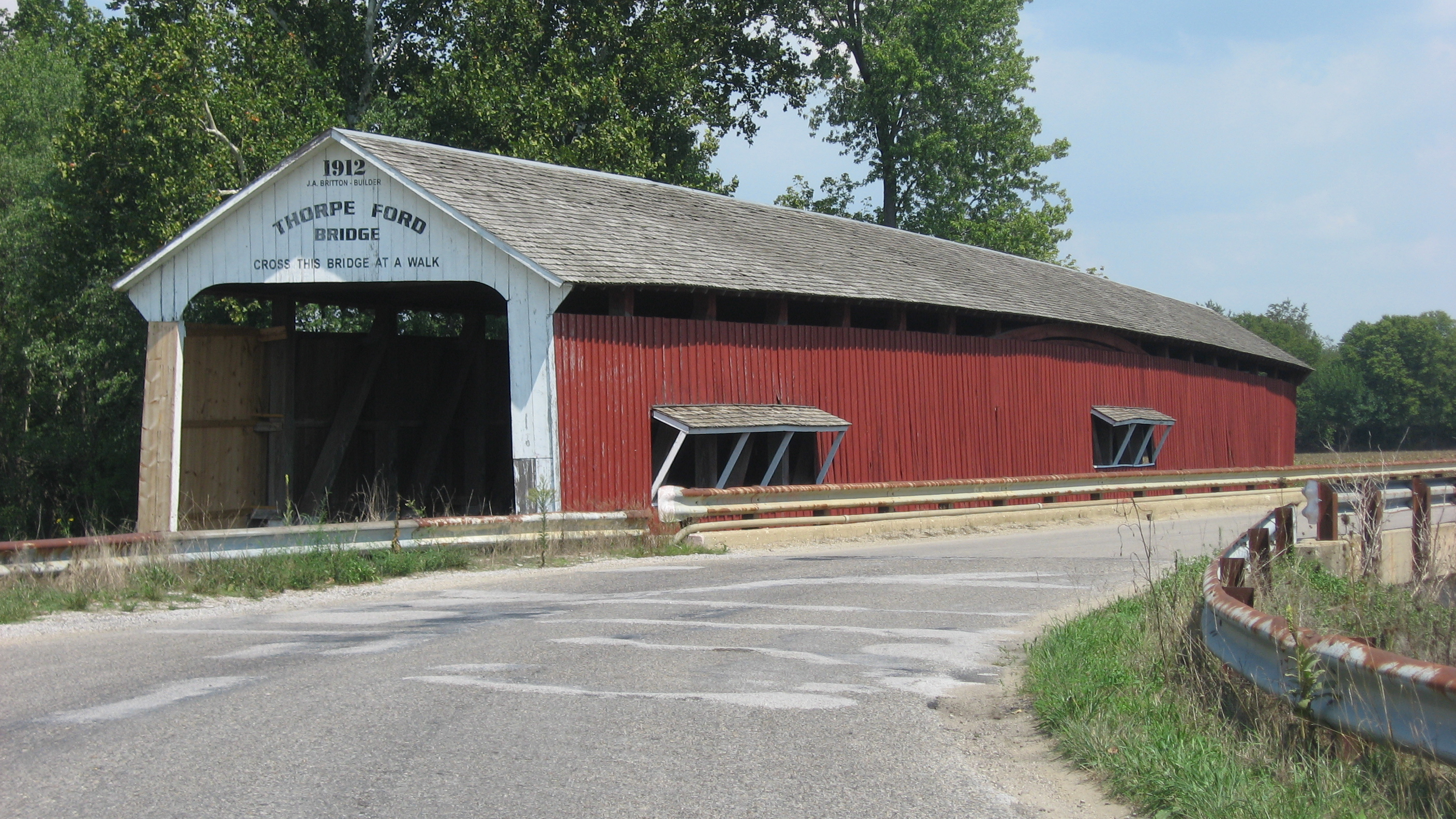
- Thorpe Ford Covered Bridge
- Coordinates: 39°38′13.45″N 87°15′52.75″W
- Carries: Rosedale-Catlin Road
- Crosses: Big Raccoon Creek, Indiana
- Locale: Parke County, Indiana, United States
- Official name: Thorpe Ford Covered Bridge
- Named for: Thorpe Ford
- Maintained by: Parke County
- WGCB Number: 1. 14-61-07

Characteristics
- Design: National Register of Historic Places
- Total length: 181 ft (55 m)163ft +9ft overhangs on each end
- Width: 16 ft (4.9 m)
- Height: 13 ft (4.0 m)

History
- Constructed by: Britton, J.A.
- Built: 1912
- Thorpe Ford Covered Bridge
- U.S. National Register of Historic Places
- MPS: Parke County Covered Bridges TR
- NRHP reference No.: 78000413
- Added to NRHP: Dec 22, 1978

Location
- Interactive map of Thorpe Ford Covered Bridge

The Thorpe Ford Covered Bridge is northeast of Rosedale, Indiana. The single span Burr Arch Truss covered bridge structure was built by Joseph A. Britton in 1912.

It was added to the National Register of Historic Places in 1978.

== History ==
Around the area where the bridge is built was originally called Thorpe Ford, named after the family that owned much of the land near the ford. The building of the bridge at this location can be attributed to County Commissioner J.M. May. It seems that after his election to County Commissioner he was attempting to travel from Rosedale to Rockville. Obtaining a short cut that would bypass Coxville he set out for Rockville. After following the convoluted directions and getting lost several times he promised that a new bridge would be built.

With the construction of the Thorpe Ford Covered Bridge the road became a major route from Terre Haute to Crawfordsville. It was nicknamed the "Ben Hur Highway" for General Lew Wallace who was a famous Crawfordsville resident and author of the famous novel Ben Hur. Many elephants and other circus animals crossed here on the way to winter camp in Peru, Indiana.

In the 1930s the WPA paved the road with concrete but most traffic was diverted to U.S. Highway 41 after its construction in the 1920s. However, heavy agricultural traffic continued to use the road which in 1960 led to the bridge being condemned and bypassed in 1961.

== See also ==
- List of Registered Historic Places in Indiana
- Parke County Covered Bridges
- Parke County Covered Bridge Festival
