= Howard Township, Indiana =

Howard Township is the name of three townships in the U.S. state of Indiana:

- Howard Township, Howard County, Indiana
- Howard Township, Parke County, Indiana
- Howard Township, Washington County, Indiana

== See also ==
- Howard Township (disambiguation)
