= Roseville Covered Bridge =

Bridge in United States of America

Roseville Covered Bridge 1866
- Coordinates: 39°39′8.03″N 87°17′37.8″W
- Carried: C.R. 325W
- Crossed: Big Raccoon Creek
- Locale: Roseville, Indiana, Parke, Indiana, United States
- Official name: Roseville Covered Bridge 1866
- Other name(s): Coxville Covered Bridge 1866
- Named for: Roseville, Indiana

Characteristics
- Total length: 250 ft (76 m)

History
- Constructed by: J. J. Daniels
- Built: September 1866
- Destroyed: April 10, 1910 Arson

The Roseville Covered Bridge 1866, also known as the Coxville covered bridge, is in Coxville also known as Roseville. The double span Burr Arch covered bridge structure was built by Joseph J. Daniels in 1866 and destroyed by arson in 1910. This was the second bridge at this location.

== History ==
=== Construction ===
The Parke County Commissioners ordered an engineering plan for the Roseville Covered Bridge from Joseph J. Daniels on September 7, 1865. Requests for bids were placed with the bids being open on October 4, 1865. J. J. Daniels was awarded the contract for $15,000 and the bridge was completed the following September, 1866. The bridge was built the same year as the Harrison Covered Bridge.

=== Destruction ===
By 1910 Roseville was entering a new period of prosperity. With a sand plant northwest of the bridge and numerous coal mines in full production. The steep hillside on the west side of Big Raccoon Creek was lined with hotels, saloons, and stores, all hastily built in boomtown style. With the first floors of the buildings set against the hillside, and built on stilt like pilings, long flights of stairs were required to reach the first floor from the road. Even the Chicago and Eastern Illinois Railroad was running four passenger trains and 16 freight or coal trains through Roseville every day.

Saturday, April 9, 1910, would turn out to be a bad day for Roseville and two young men. After arriving at the glass sand plant, near the bridge, in a surly mood, the younger of the two would be arsonist argued with the foreman and was fired. The older of the two, 25, walked off the job with him. From there they visited the local "blind tiger" to drink.

Around 11pm that evening the night watchman at the glass sand plant discovered a fire on the roof. With the help of several others they were able to put the fire out. That's when they found an oil soaked rag had been thrown on the roof to start the fire. After midnight, when the men that had helped fight the fire started home, they found that the bridge was on fire but was too far gone already to save it. There had been some tracks allegedly left by the arsonists but because of the pairs attitude at the fire attention was focused on them.

Because the Parke County Sheriff wasn't available one of the counties deputies started an investigation. He deputized another man and had Blake Gloss drive them from Rockville to Roseville. Acting on reports on the younger man, he was soon arrested. When they checked the home of the older man they didn't find him. Following another report that he was walking toward Rosedale the deputy started that way. The older arsonist changed his mind though and turned back toward home. While walking past the bridge ruins he was recognized and the assistant deputy started chasing him. The arsonist ran down the railroad tracks but was caught. They were both moved to Rockville sometime after noon on Sunday and placed in the Parke County Jail. On Monday they confessed and a few weeks later they were sentenced to 2-21 year terms at the State Reformatory at Jeffersonville. It would seem though that the two men were unrepentant of their crime. While waiting in the Rockville jail they composed a ballad describing their adventure. Only the first stanza though is remembered: "We first set fire to the sand plant. And went on up the ridge. And it didn't prove successful. So we went and burned the bridge."

The Roseville Covered Bridge was the only bridge in Parke County that had fire insurance, but, by the time of the fire, it had long expired.

== See also ==
- Parke County Covered Bridges
- Parke County Covered Bridge Festival
