= Reserve Township =

Reserve Township may refer to the following townships in the United States:

- Reserve Township, Parke County, Indiana
- Reserve Township, Pennsylvania
