= Terre Haute House =

Historic hotel in Indiana

Coordinates: 39.4667°N 87.4067°W

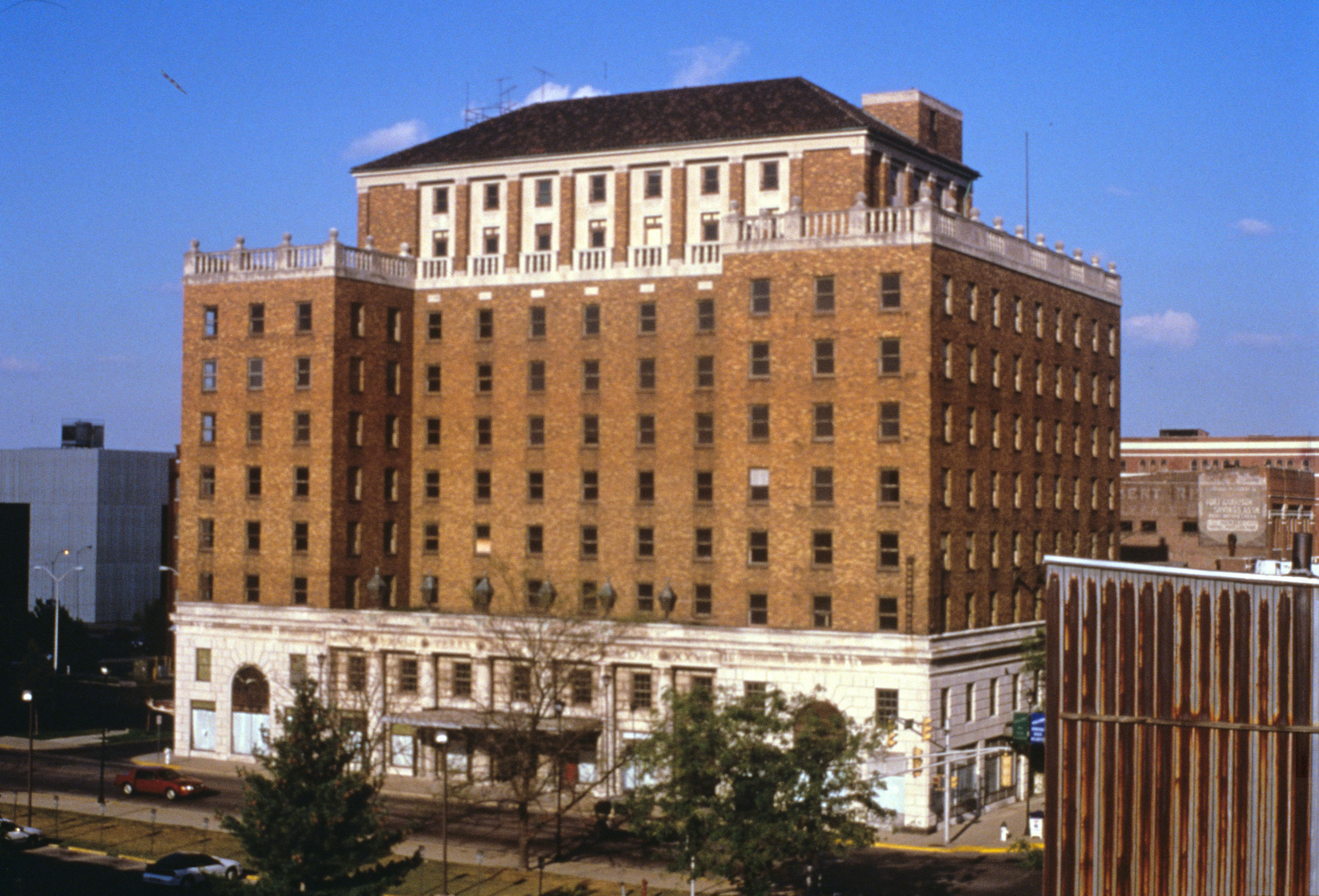
- Interactive map of the Terre Haute House area
- Former names: The Prairie House

General information
- Architectural style: Renaissance Revival
- Location: Terre Haute, Indiana
- Demolished: 2007

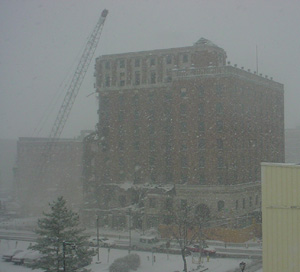
Demolition of the north wing; December 2005

The Terre Haute House was a historic hotel in downtown Terre Haute, Indiana, United States. Despite efforts to preserve it, the building was demolished in 2005 and replaced by the Hilton Garden Inn Terre Haute, which opened in 2007.

The Terre Haute House was a Renaissance Revival-style, 10-story building located on the northeast corner of Seventh Street and Wabash Avenue (U.S. Highway 40). It was a high-class accommodation between the 1920s and the 1950s, a time when Terre Haute's well-known illegal gambling operations and other businesses of ill repute brought high rollers to the area.

== From Prairie House to Terre Haute House ==
The first Terre Haute House was built by Terre Hautean, Chauncey Rose, who called it "The Prairie House" because it was located "in the prairie", several blocks east of the village. Rose operated the original hotel from 1838 to 1841. When federal funding for continued construction of the National Road dried up in 1840, and the U.S. Army Corps of Engineers, who supervised construction of the highway, departed the community, the hotel was closed. In the meantime, historical information seems to indicate that the hotel was turned into a boarding house.

With the anticipated opening of the Wabash and Erie Canal at Terre Haute in 1849, Rose reopened the hotel that year and renamed it “The Terre Haute House” in 1855. He also added a fourth floor of guest rooms at that time.

By 1866, Rose was tired of the hotel business and considered donating the property for educational purposes. This did not sit well with members of the local business community, so they formed the Terre Haute Hotel Company and purchased the Terre Haute House from Rose.

Two more ownership changes transpired in the 1870s. In late 1888, Charles Baur, brother of Jacob Baur, founder of Liquid Carbonics Manufacturing Company, managed the hotel, after the second Terre Haute Hotel Company acquired it from the estate of William Tuell in March 1888.

Eventually, Crawford Fairbanks purchased the hotel and property and promised to demolish the existing structure and build a new, much grander hotel on the site. It would be left to his heirs to see this promise to completion, following Fairbanks' death in 1924. Although the decision was made to go ahead with the project in 1925, work did not begin until early 1927. Following the demolition of the old hotel, work began on the new hotel in the spring of 1927.

== Second Terre Haute House ==
The new Terre Haute House opened on July 2, 1928. Fred & Harry Van Orman, Inc., a Chicago-based hotel management company owned, at the time, by E. L. Wenzel, took over the new hotel's operations and Wenzel himself became the manager.

The country's rich, famous, and infamous were frequent guests. Rumored among them was Al Capone. With a thriving red light district during those years (though modest compared to the activity which had existed in the 1910s and 1920s), Terre Haute had gambling and prostitution operations that were attractive to visitors like Capone. A biography of Benjamin “Scatman” Crothers seems to be the source of the story that Capone stayed in Terre Haute, but this cannot be proven.

It has also been said that bank robber John Dillinger stayed at the Terre Haute House, although some dispute this. Dillinger supposedly had a deal with local police so they would leave him alone, but this, too, cannot be confirmed.

=== Downtown in decline ===
The vice that for so many years had run rampant in Terre Haute was on the way out by the time Terre Haute businessman and Indianapolis Motor Speedway owner Tony Hulman purchased the hotel along with the Terre Haute House Garage and Terre Haute Opera House in 1959. Hulman, whose fortune had been made in his family's distillery, wholesale grocery and baking powder businesses, radio and TV stations, utility companies, and the Indianapolis Motor Speedway, wanted to breathe new life into the old hotel.

When construction started on Interstate 70 along Terre Haute's south side, more and more stores and other businesses found that part of town to be far more accessible and inviting than downtown. More modern hotels and motels sprang up in that area along U.S. 41, including a large Holiday Inn that opened in 1962. With all of this competition, Terre Haute's downtown area, like so many others across the country, spiraled into a rapid decline.

The Terre Haute House was not spared the indignities of this decline. The old hotel lost much of its business to the newer hotels and motels, and when the traveling public stopped coming with their former regularity, the hotel became unprofitable. According to Richard Van Allen, who managed the hotel at the time, Hulman tried to keep the hotel open despite the fact that he lost a great deal of money in doing so. Van Allen told the Tribune-Star in 1997 that, toward the end, Hulman sold food at cost and allowed local civic groups to meet in the hotel for free, just to keep people coming in.

On June 18, 1970, Van Allen gathered the hotel staff in the Prairie Room and informed them that the Terre Haute House would close within two weeks. Exactly 42 years and two days after it opened, the Terre Haute House closed to guests on July 4, 1970.

Even though the hotel closed, several businesses remained in the building following its closure, evidently in hopes that the hotel would eventually reopen. When that didn't happen, the tenants simply went out of business or moved elsewhere. The last holdout, World Wide Travel Service, moved out of the hotel to a location on Ohio Street (one block south of the hotel) in the fall of 1980.

=== Attempts at revival ===
In the 35 years between the Terre Haute House's closing and the start of demolition, numerous developers advanced plans to either renovate and reopen the hotel or demolish it and redevelop the land. Much to the chagrin of local residents, nothing ever got off the ground, and some residents and, most notably, a number of city officials eventually came to see the dilapidated hotel as the ultimate symbol of downtown Terre Haute's stagnation.

In March 1984, then-Terre Haute mayor P. Pete Chalos threatened to condemn the hotel property in an attempt to force the Hulman family into selling it. This didn't work, but it did seem to spur interest among developers, who began working in earnest to put plans together to restore and reopen the old hotel.

Over the decade that followed Chalos' threat, redevelopment plans were advanced and then withdrawn in what seemed to be a perpetual cycle of hopes raised and then dashed. Perhaps the most serious proposal was offered in the mid-1990s. At Chalos' urging, the Walden Group, led by Texas developer Don Daseke, who had developed an attractive hotel on the campus of Depauw University in Greencastle, Indiana, put together what was by most accounts, a very attractive package that would have returned the Terre Haute House to its original use as a luxury hotel, making it a convention destination under the Radisson banner.

Daseke managed to sign a purchase agreement with the Hulman family for the hotel in the summer of 1995, and Radisson signed on early the next year. All of his plans were contingent upon financing, however. Despite the fact local banks in Terre Haute were not and could not be convinced that it would work, they had reached the point where they had essentially decided to give a green light to the project, fully expecting that Daske would end up filing bankruptcy and, perhaps, the subsequent operator before the operation would stabilize. One board member of one of the biggest banks involved, however, insisted that underwriting requirements be imposed that Daseke would later call “onerous.” Daseke pulled out of the project in January 1997, citing the banks' intractability.

The board member who changed the course of the Daseke project was Greg Gibson, whose family, at the time, owned the only full-service hotel in the downtown area, the Larry Bird's "Boston Connection" (which is now a Days Inn with no connection to Bird). Terre Haute First National Bank had decided, despite some reservations, to fund the Daseke project. When bank board member Gibson learned of the bank's intention, he successfully blocked it to protect his interest in the Boston Connection.

Another group of potential investors, with Daseke on board, then turned to a proposal that would have converted the hotel into senior citizen housing. This, too, fell by the wayside.

Later that year, in an interview with the Tribune-Star for a special series of articles on the Hulman family, Tony George, Tony Hulman's grandson and the face of today's Hulman family empire, damned the Terre Haute House with faint praise while basically reiterating the family's indifference toward the old hotel. “I think architecturally it's significant, historically it's significant and it would be really nice to see it somehow evolve to be part of the downtown again,” he said. “I just don't think that we are in any position to develop it ourselves, given everything else that's going on. If no one develops it, we'll probably demolish it.”

In 2002, following Tony George's pronouncement regarding his general disinterest in the Terre Haute House, John R. Bischoff met with Hulman officials Jeff Belskus, Curt Brighton, and Fred Nation, and convinced them to consider one last effort to renovate the property. Bischoff, along with local attorney C. Joseph Anderson and Charles Faust of Summit Hotel Management formed Haute Maison Development LLC for that purpose. Haute Maison struck a deal with Marriott Corporation. HNTB became the architect of record and F. A. Wilhelm was selected to renovate the structure.

Complicating the effort to fund the project was that Mayor Judy Anderson, in office at the beginning of Haute Maison's effort, was the sister-in-law of Haute Maison partner C. Joseph Anderson. Anderson was already under attack for choosing one of her sons to serve as her administrative assistant and for granting another son a city sidewalk contract. Many political observers believe such decisions significantly contributed to her defeat by Kevin Burke in the May 2003 mayoral primary.

By the time Burke took office, Haute Maison had secured the necessary funding commitments in the form of syndication of Historic Tax Credits, New Markets Tax Credits, and certain state credits. Essentially all funding, including the mortgage funding was to come from out-of-town sources.

Bischoff and Anderson met with Burke, not to obtain any form of city financial support, but to ask him to refrain from seeking to block their effort. In response, Burke later attended an Urban Enterprise Association meeting in which he warned the membership against providing the project $250,000 in assistance it had promised the developers.

Later, a legal representative of the developer's New Market Tax Credit funding source came to town simply to determine that the city was receptive to the development. Burke, through his representative, successfully soured the representative on investment in the city. He had many other cities seeking such investment and willing to contribute their fair share.

Burke successfully blocked all other efforts to renovate the building by convincing the building owners to allow the city to take control and create and publish a request for proposals for the structure. Attorneys for both the building owner and the city drafted the RFP. The RFP specified that no city assistance would be provided and $1,000,000 in assistance, previously promised to prospective developers by the property owner, would now be unavailable. All responses to the RFP were rejected and the project and several million dollars in public assistance and unspecified incentives provided by the property owner were made available to Greg Gibson, who did not present a proposal in response to the RFP.

When Kevin Burke was elected mayor of Terre Haute in 2003, he promised to decide the issue once and for all — Burke's campaign platform had included tearing down the Terre Haute House from the early days of his mayoral run. Once elected, Burke's administration obtained an option to purchase the property from the Hulman family in October 2004.

In January 2005, the city's Department of Redevelopment put out a request for proposals for rehabilitating the old hotel and other historic buildings on the property or redeveloping the site. On May 25, 2005, the committee overseeing the process announced that none of the four rehab proposals met the city's stated financial criteria and thus the project was back at square one once again. The city's purchase option expired the following month, leaving the hotel's future once again in limbo.

=== Suitability for reclamation ===
The hotel's location in sleepy downtown Terre Haute, coupled with the deterioration of the old building, gave the local government and business community pause when considering proposals to restore the landmark hotel. As restoration cost estimates continued to climb over the years, the willingness of the Terre Haute House's owners (the Hulman family) to work with would-be restorers faded.

And while its façade was beginning to crumble, the structure of the Terre Haute House itself seems to have been very sound. The concrete and steel superstructure would have lent themselves well to restoration and upgrading, but with many interior surfaces damaged by decades of water infiltration, any such effort would have been a costly proposition.

In addition to the damage brought on by the water infiltration, other factors would surely have inflated the cost of any restoration. Recall that the hotel was built more than 75 years ago. In the three-quarters of a century since that time, construction, plumbing and electrical codes have been updated many times over. Also, the Americans with Disabilities Act requires certain accessibility provisions be made for those with physical limitations.

The ADA requirements alone would have proven difficult to satisfy, given the hotel's general layout. Add to that the fact that any one of the other demands of compliance with the various building codes would have pushed the price of restoration significantly higher, and it becomes somewhat easier to understand why the hotel was not restored.

In the end, though, political pressure to demolish the old hotel - which was dubbed by Mayor Burke in 2003 “an impediment to downtown revitalization” — ultimately proved to be the final blow for the Terre Haute House. Although reuse advocates still maintain that the 1927 Terre Haute House was a great candidate for restoration (despite the cost), each swing of the 6,000-pound wrecking ball that reduced the landmark to rubble in the winter of 2005 punctuated the decision of local government and business leaders to close the door forever on that possibility.

In the same year Terre Haute officials decided to demolish the city's landmark hotel, the city fathers of Oklahoma City decided to save theirs. The Skirvin Hotel, built in downtown Oklahoma City in 1910, had by 1988 succumbed to the same societal changes and resulting economic realities that closed the Terre Haute House for good. Developers there spent $56.4 million to reopen the Skirvin as a 225-room hotel. About $18 million of the funding came in the form of public assistance.

Various developers in Terre Haute came forth with proposals to renovate its famous hotel. These developers sought only $1,000,000 in assistance, either from the public sector or the Hulman family, which had in the past pledged that much to such a project. One such proposal estimated renovation costs at $20,000,000 to reopen the structure as a 138-unit Marriott by Courtyard.

Terre Haute officials published its Request for Proposals on October 14, 2004, but withheld all forms of public support for any project involving the renovation of the existing structure.

=== Demolition ===
In September 2005, the Terre Haute Tribune-Star newspaper reported that an agreement had been reached between a new local limited liability corporation, Seventh & Wabash, LLC, and Terre Haute Realty Corporation (the Hulman family's real-estate holding company, which managed the Terre Haute House and several of the family's other properties). Seventh & Wabash, owned by local businessman Greg Gibson, would purchase the Terre Haute House, the Bement-Rea Building, and the former Fort Harrison Savings & Loan (the buildings were all on the same block). No sale price was immediately announced, leading some to wonder how much the Hulman family stood to make from the deal.

Rumors began to swirl following the sale announcement that all three buildings would be demolished; this news did not encourage local residents who had hoped to someday see the hotel and neighboring buildings returned to their former splendor. Fred Nation, a spokesman for the Hulman family, initially denied reports that the Terre Haute House would be demolished. That was the family's official line when news of the impending sale first broke, but it soon became obvious that the end was near.

Dennis Trucking and Excavation, a company also owned by Gibson, began removing asbestos and other hazardous materials from the site in mid-September 2005. Permit applications filed with the Indiana Department of Environmental Management (IDEM) indicated that the removal was "to facilitate demolition".

On September 15, Gibson told the Tribune-Star in an interview that the language of the IDEM permit application was correct. The Terre Haute House was going to be coming down — and quickly. "We think we can get the demolition done in about 120 days," Gibson told the newspaper. "It's a very aggressive demolition schedule."

The question of the sale price of the property was finally answered when the Tribune-Star reported in its September 29, 2005, edition that the three buildings were sold by Terre Haute Realty Corp. to Seventh & Wabash for $1, but, according to filings with the Vigo County auditor, in the end, it was the Hulmans who paid Gibson — rather than the other way around — in the form of a "development fee", just to take the property off their hands. The amount of this fee was not stated and, given the Hulman heirs' penchant for privacy in their business dealings, it may never be revealed publicly. Nation, once again speaking for the Hulman family, would say only that "clearly the property sold has a negative value and the sale terms reflect that."

As Gibson and the Hulmans hashed out the details of their deal, Terre Haute developer John Bischoff (who had worked to raise funds to restore the building, beginning in 2001 after signing a Memorandum of Understanding with the city and Hulman interests and whose "Haute Maison" group had submitted one of the most recent proposals for the site after the city had obtained its purchase option) protested the asbestos removal, calling it unsafe for those in the area around the hotel site. Bischoff was quoted by the Tribune-Star as saying that he and others who were interested in saving the Terre Haute House "(would) make it as painful as possible" for Gibson and when asked if that could include lawsuits, he replied, "Yes, whatever we can do."

Bischoff and his group did not get the chance to file a lawsuit prior to the commencement of demolition. Bischoff did, though, file a Tort Claim Notice with the City of Terre Haute, dated December 15, 2005, a filing required under Indiana law to allow him to pursue litigation against the city in the future. In the presence of the winter of 2005, however, demolition began almost immediately after the ink dried on the contracts.

Initial demolition of the hotel began during the last week of September 2005, when excavators ripped away the attached two-story section at the rear of the hotel (which contained the Mayflower Ballroom). This section was chosen as the starting point because it allowed crews more room to bring in the equipment needed to demolish the 10-story main portion of the hotel.

Workers erected plywood barrier walls along Seventh Street and Wabash Avenue to keep passersby away from the hotel during demolition preparations. This was done in part because of fears that portions of the exterior were in danger of collapsing. These fears were not totally without merit, as a portion of the brick façade on the east side of the hotel had broken loose in July 2005, falling to the roof of the Mayflower Ballroom.

The neighboring Bement-Rea Building (which housed a noted local tavern, T's Lounge, until its closure at the end of October 2005) and former Fort Harrison Savings & Loan were demolished along with the Terre Haute House, although some (but not all) historically significant items were removed from the buildings prior to their demise.

As the asbestos-removal portion of the demolition entered its final days in early October 2005, Dennis Trucking's John Hanley III told the Tribune-Star that implosion looked like the obvious choice for bringing down the Terre Haute House. However, the owners and tenants of nearby buildings, many of which are also in the Wabash Avenue East National Register Historic District, expressed concern that blowing up the 10-story tower could severely damage or even destroy their homes and places of business.

On October 20, 2005, Terre Haute television station WTWO reported that asbestos removal was complete and that a final decision would be announced on the demolition method within a week.

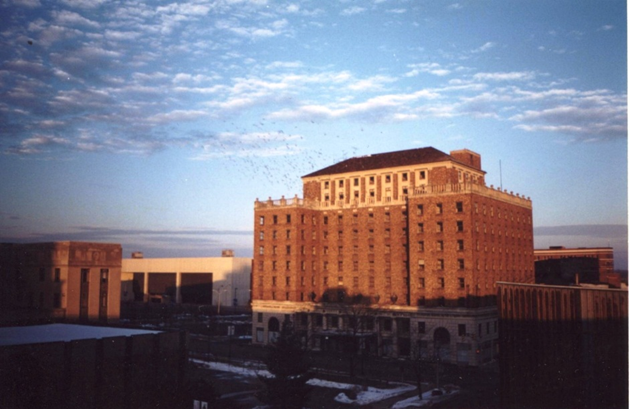
Wabash Avenue-East Historic District, Wabash Ave. and 7th and 8th Sts.; also 26-34 8th St.; also roughly bounded by 6th, Ohio, 7th, and Walnut Sts. Terre Haute

The following week, the Tribune-Star reported that crews would knock down the Terre Haute House with a crane and wrecking ball. Workers took to the roof to remove clay roofing tiles from the highest part of the doomed building to avoid the possibility that they could cause personal harm or property damage by falling on automobiles or pedestrians.

As of early November 2005, reports from the various Terre Haute media outlets indicated that the entire demolition project would be completed by the end of January 2006. It did not take that long. Swift progress was made, with the crane operator telling a Tribune-Star reporter that, while some parts of the building were solid enough, he thought other parts came down almost too easily when hit with his 6,000-pound wrecking ball. The last remaining portion of the old hotel's façade, the lower floors of the southwest corner, was demolished on December 28, 2005, bringing the Terre Haute House's nearly 78-year life to a close.

Once the demolition of the old Terre Haute House kicked into high gear, some Terre Haute residents began to voice concerns that the former hotel property would become just another vacant lot. However, it soon became clear that the property would not stay empty for long.

On November 10, 2005, the Tribune-Star reported that Dora Hotel Company, LLC., based in Fishers, Indiana, would develop a new, 109-room hotel on the site of the old Terre Haute House.

Dubbed the Hilton Garden Inn Terre Haute House, the new hotel's architecture may be reminiscent of downtown Terre Haute's historic buildings, but with a style of its own. The stone pediment etched with the words "TERRE HAUTE HOUSE" from the Seventh Street side of the old hotel will be used over the entrance to the new six-story structure, and some other items may also be utilized. The Dora's emphasize, however, that their new hotel will be thoroughly modern.

Plans for the new hotel call for four luxury suites, a heated indoor pool, high-speed internet service, convention and meeting space and many other amenities, all of which are demanded by today's hotel guests. The new hotel is intended to cater to the business traveler, and it is hoped that its close proximity to Indiana State University and ISU's Hulman Center multipurpose arena, as well as Rose-Hulman Institute of Technology and a host of tourist destinations, will provide a steady stream of guests.

Mayor Burke called the announcement “exhilarating news,” and added that he had heard something was in the works. He also stated that one of his goals, once the old Terre Haute House was gone, was for something to happen quickly on the site.

=== Salvaging significant items ===
Many local residents were appalled by the demolition of the Terre Haute House, but with the end in sight, efforts turned to saving as much of what was inside the buildings as possible. Having been largely empty for more than 35 years, much of the interior and exterior of the Terre Haute House were, not surprisingly, in an advanced state of decay. Greg Gibson, the new owner, and the demolition team worked with the Vigo County Historical Society and other interested parties to save some historically significant items within the hotel and neighboring buildings.

Here is a list of what was removed:

- The bar that was originally located in the Marine Room. Clad in copper, it is shown in several old photos of the Marine Room and was quite shiny in its heyday. After undergoing restoration, one-half of this bar has been installed in a new tavern that occupies the former Frog's Bistro across Wabash Avenue from the old hotel. Fittingly, the new establishment will be called "The Copper Bar". The other half is rumored to be in a private home in Terre Haute, but this cannot be verified.
- The marble countertop from the hotel's front desk. Current whereabouts unknown.
- The Mayflower Room's mural, which is to be restored by local artists, although it is undecided where the restored mural will be placed.
- The stone eagle from the Fort Harrison Savings & Loan building. The Tribune-Star reported that it was given to the Hulman family.
- The Brass and iron mail box that sat in front of the cigar store has been salvaged and restored and is in the home of a local Terre Haute family. A portion of the chute that extended to each floor was salvaged but has not been restored or reattached to the mail box,
- Two grand pianos. Both grand pianos, a Kimball and a Chickering and Sons, are now in private ownership and planned for complete restoration.

It also appears that many other valuable and historically significant items were destroyed with the hotel. Each room contained a cast iron radiator and a bathroom with a glass-shelved medicine cabinet, a porcelain pedestal-type sink, a porcelain tub, and a Starr Brown bottle opener with a corkscrew. Shell-shaped glass light fixtures adorned the bathrooms, and square glass fixtures were still present in the bedrooms. Hundreds of varnished hardwood doors, a lobby full of solid walnut paneling, and much marble were also mixed with the rubble. The basement still contained cooking utensils, china, pots, pans, and machinery at the time of demolition. An antique drill press and other tools were still present in the basement, as well as keys to all of the rooms.

== Notable guests ==
- Chauncey Rose was an early Terre Haute resident who, in 1831, purchased 320 acres (1.3 km^{2}) on both sides of what is now the city's Wabash Avenue. Rose later built the first hotel on that land, the Prairie House, in 1837–38, and operated it until 1841. The hotel reopened in 1849, was renamed the Terre Haute House in 1855, and sold to the Terre Haute Hotel Company (formed by a group of local businessmen) in 1866. Rose Polytechnic Institute (today known as Rose-Hulman Institute of Technology) was named in his honor.
- William B. Hawkins purchased the Terre Haute House from the Terre Haute Hotel Co. in 1872.
- William B. Tuell and George F. Ripley purchased the hotel from Hawkins in 1875. Ripley managed the hotel until 1878.
- Charles Baur leased the hotel in 1884 and installed electric lights in all of its rooms in 1886, making the Terre Haute House the first hotel in the world to be so equipped.
- William Putnam Ijams and his partners Charles and Jacob Baur formed a corporation to purchase the Terre Haute House property in 1888. Ijams later became a partner in the Watson-Beggs Company, which purchased the hotel in 1901.
- Crawford Fairbanks, a noted Terre Haute resident, purchased the hotel from Watson-Beggs in the early 1900s. At one point, he promised to build a new, grand hotel on the site. He died in 1924 without having done so, but his heirs followed up on his promise in 1927.
- Anton "Tony" Hulman Jr. was a prominent Terre Haute industrialist, owner of Hulman & Co. (manufacturer of baking powder, coffee, and other grocery items), and president of the Indianapolis Motor Speedway. Hulman purchased the hotel in 1959 and closed it in 1970 following several years of a steady decline in business.
- Richard Van Allen, Manager of the hotel during the Hulman years, was charged with the job of telling the hotel's employees that the hotel would close.
- P. Pete Chalos, mayor of Terre Haute from 1980 to 1996, threatened in 1984 to condemn the Terre Haute House if the Hulman family refused to sell it, and later instigated a failed Terre Haute House revival effort headed by Don Daseke.
- Joseph Walesky was the president of Indianapolis-based Metropolitan Management Specialists, Inc., and negotiated unsuccessfully to buy the hotel property in 1986.
- Stephen Cornell l negotiated on behalf of Chicago-based Halcor Realty & Development Co. and Anderson Realty Investment Co. in 1987 and continuing into 1988 to purchase and restore the hotel but was not able to secure financing.
- Don Daseke, a Dallas, Texas, real estate developer and chairman of The Walden Group, worked with little success to put together a package to purchase, renovate, and reopen the Terre Haute House as a Radisson property in the mid-1990s.
- Kevin Burke, mayor of Terre Haute from 2004 to 2008, promised in his election campaign to "settle the issue" of the Terre Haute House. While he did indeed "settle the issue," he was narrowly defeated in his 2007 bid for re-election, and later sued his successor, Duke Bennett, claiming Bennett was ineligible to run for office. The case wound its way through Indiana's courts until finally being decided in Bennett's favor in June 2009.
- Greg Gibson, a Terre Haute businessman and developer, purchased the Terre Haute House and adjacent Bement-Rea and Fort Harrison Savings & Loan buildings from the Hulman family and had them demolished for redevelopment in 2005.
- Timothy J. Dora, whose Fishers, Indiana-based Dora Hotel Company, LLC operates hotels across Indiana, made Terre Haute the next city served by their hotels when the new Hilton Garden Inn Terre Haute was completed on the former Terre Haute House/Fort Harrison S&L/Bement-Rea site in 2007. The company added a second Terre Haute hotel downtown, and a third hotel on the city's south side near I-70 and U.S. 41.
