= Harry Evans Covered Bridge =

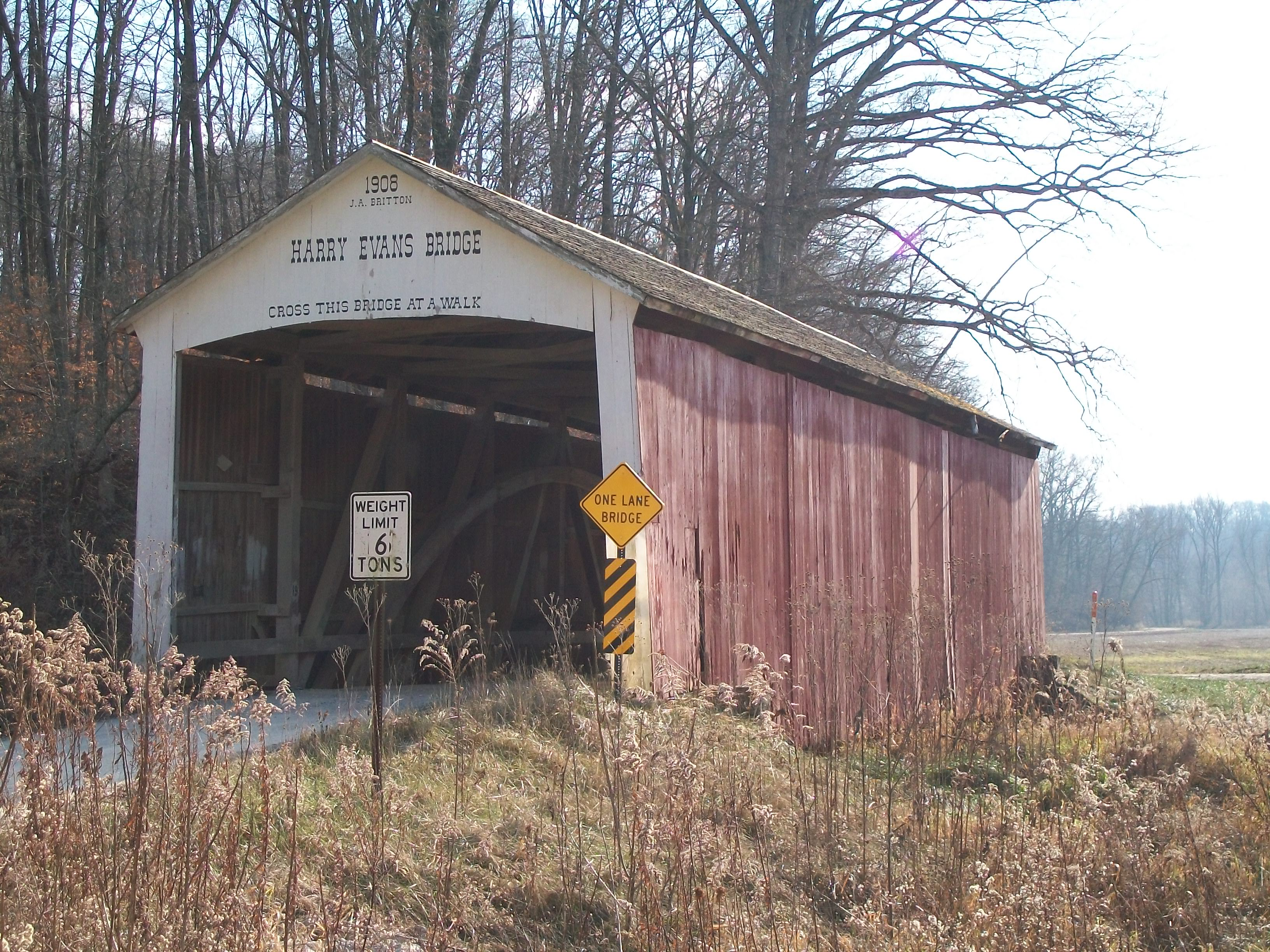
- Harry Evans Covered Bridge
- Coordinates: 39°39′43.62″N 87°17′40.07″W
- Carries: C.R. 325W
- Crosses: Rock Run (Indiana)
- Locale: Parke County, Indiana, United States
- Official name: Harry Evans Covered Bridge
- Named for: Harry Evans
- Maintained by: Parke County Commissioners; Parke County
- WGCB #: 14-61-10

Characteristics
- Design: Burr arch truss bridge
- Material: Concrete (foundations)
- Trough construction: Wood
- Total length: 81 ft (24.7 m) (includes 8 ft (2.4 m) overhang on each end)
- Width: 16 ft (4.9 m)
- Longest span: 65 ft (19.8 m)
- No. of spans: 1
- Load limit: 6 short tons (5.4 t; 12,000 lb)
- Clearance above: 13 ft (4.0 m)
- Harry Evans Covered Bridge (#19)
- U.S. National Register of Historic Places
- U.S. Historic district – Contributing property
- Location within Parke County, Indiana Location within Indiana Location within the United States
- Built: 1908
- Built by: Joseph A. Britton
- Website: Harry Evans Bridge
- Part of: Parke County Covered Bridges TR (ID64000193)
- NRHP reference No.: 78000392
- Added to NRHP: December 22, 1978

Location
- Interactive map of Harry Evans Covered Bridge

The Harry Evans Covered Bridge is a single span Burr Arch Truss structure that crosses Rock Run built in 1908 by J.A. Britton 1/2 mi (0.80 km) north of Coxville, Indiana, United States.

== History ==
The story goes that one of the former neighbors of the bridge was incensed over naming the bridge after a local resident, Harry Evans. He claimed that because Harry lived at the top of the hill that it was named after another Evans who lived in the valley. However, county records show that Harry Evans owned the land near the bridge. The land stayed in the Evans name until the 1960s.

It was added to the National Register of Historic Places in 1978. The hills near the bridge are riddled with numerous, and dangerous, old coal mines.

== Gallery ==
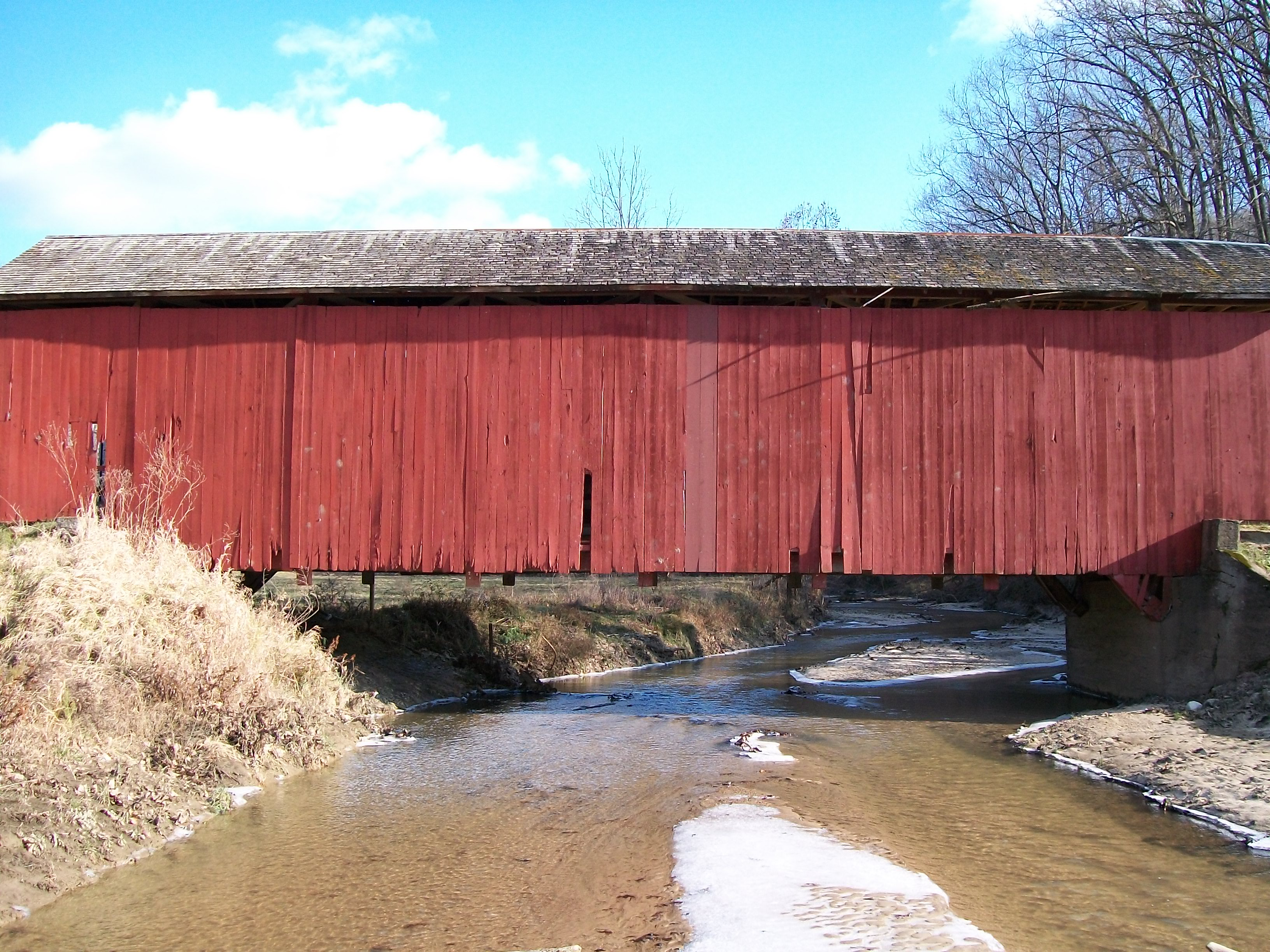
Side view of the Harry Evans Bridge

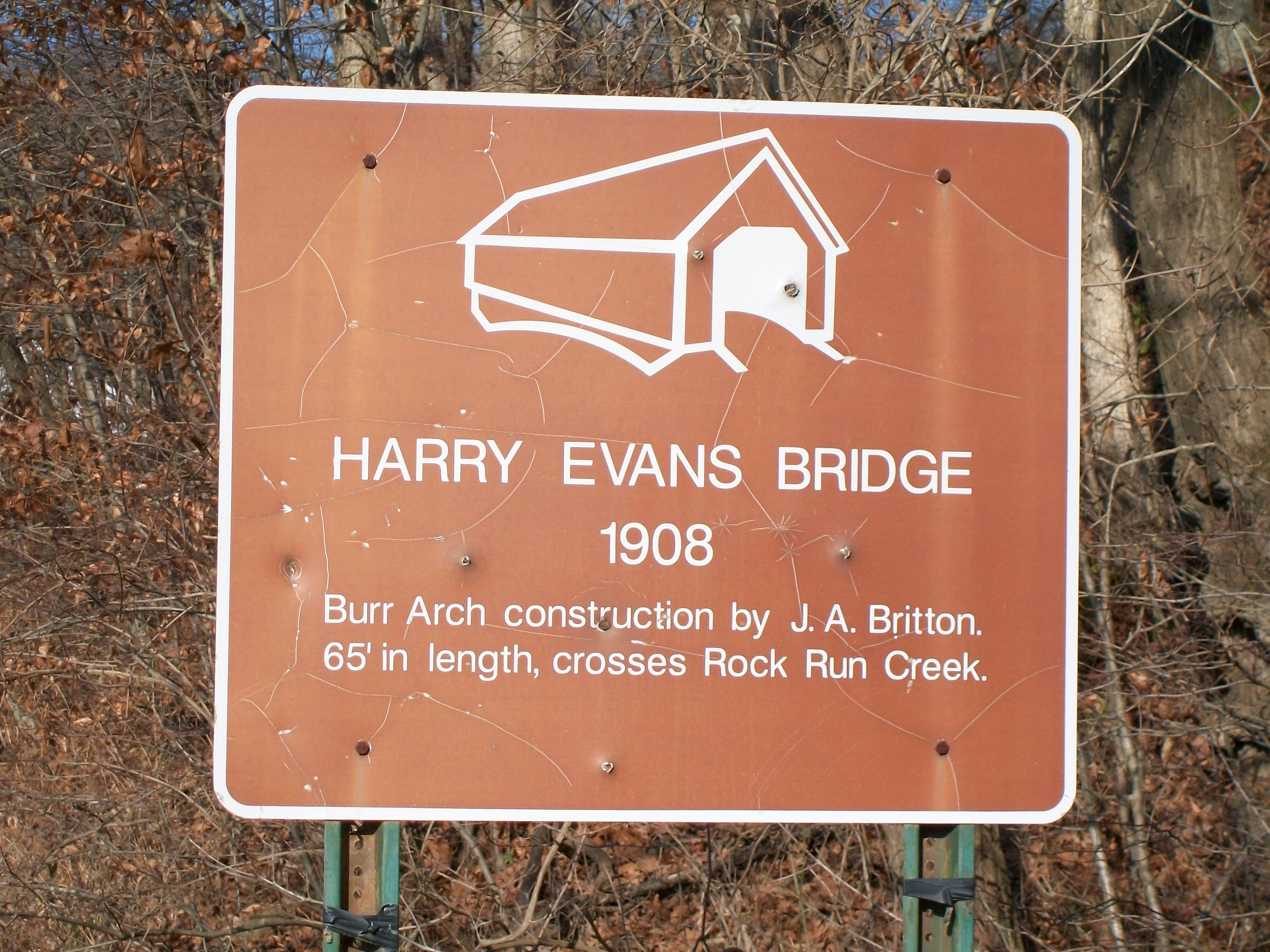
Information plaque

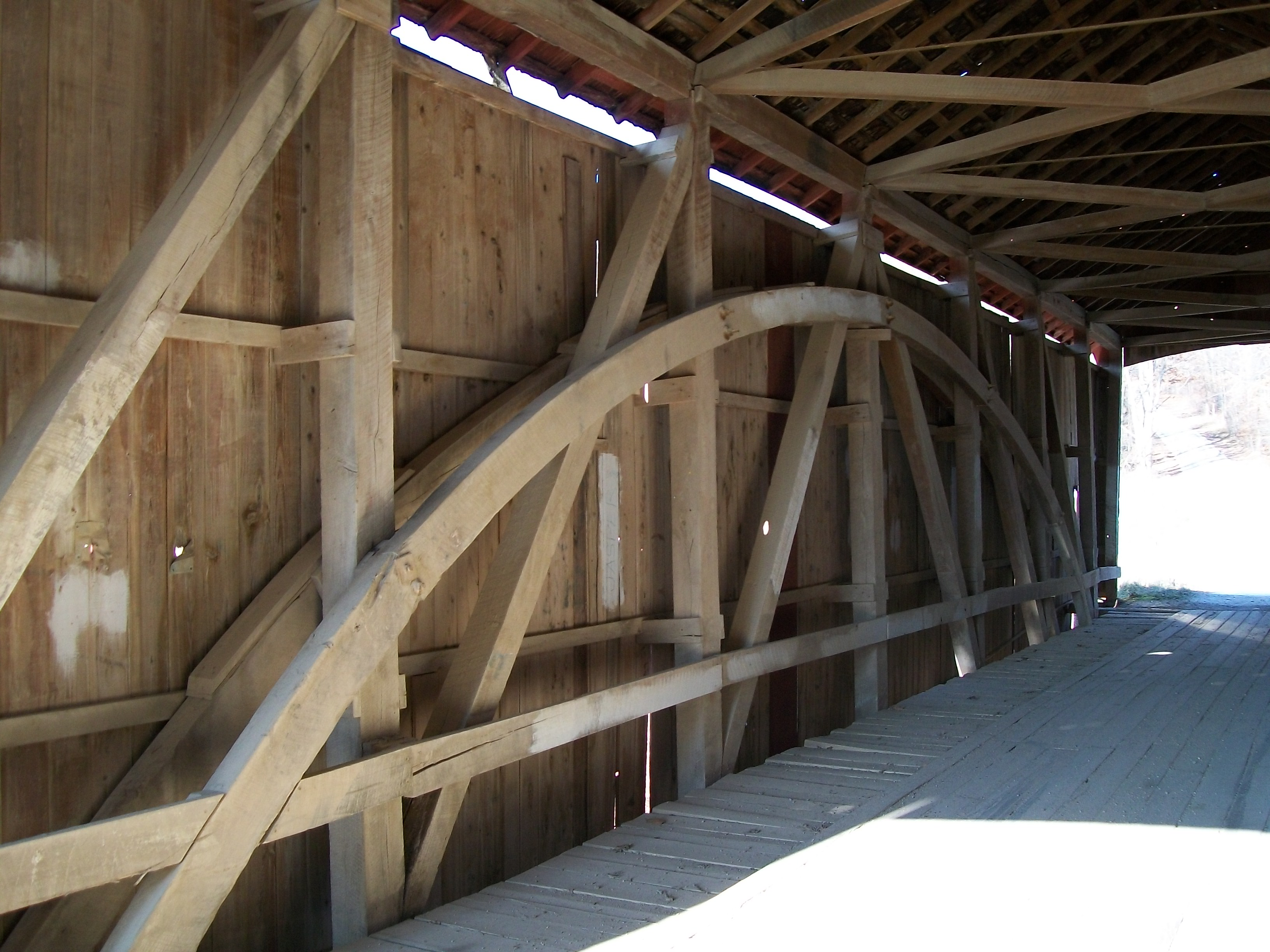
Interior of the Harry Evans Bridge

== See also ==
- List of Registered Historic Places in Indiana
- Parke County Covered Bridges
- Parke County Covered Bridge Festival
