= Lyford, Indiana =

Unincorporated community in Indiana, United States

- Unincorporated community and Census-designated place
- Parke County's location in Indiana

- Location in Parke County
- Coordinates: 39°39′02″N 87°22′23″W
- Country: United States
- State: Indiana
- County: Parke
- Township: Florida
- Elevation: 545 ft (166 m)
- Time zone: UTC-5 (Eastern (EST))
  - Summer (DST): UTC-4 (EDT)
- ZIP code: 47874
- Area code: 765
- GNIS feature ID: 2830490

Lyford, also called Williamson, is an unincorporated community and census-designated place in western Florida Township, Parke County, in the U.S. state of Indiana. The town was formerly the site of Lyford School.

== History ==
Lyford was founded in 1892, and named in honor of W. H. Lyford, a railroad official. A post office was established at Lyford in 1892, and remained in operation until it was discontinued in 1912.

== Demographics ==
The United States Census Bureau first delineated Lyford as a census designated place in the 2022 American Community Survey.
