= Greene Township, Parke County, Indiana =

Greene Township
- Township
- Location in Parke County
- Coordinates: 39°49′11″N 87°04′06″W
- Country: United States
- State: Indiana
- County: Parke

Government
  - Type: Indiana township

Area
  - Total: 35.65 sq mi (92.3 km^{2})
  - Land: 35.55 sq mi (92.1 km^{2})
  - Water: 0.09 sq mi (0.23 km^{2}) 0.25%
- Elevation: 676 ft (206 m)

Population (2020)
  - Total: 413
  - Density: 11.6/sq mi (4.49/km^{2})
- Time zone: UTC-5 (Eastern (EST))
  - Summer (DST): UTC-4 (EDT)
- ZIP codes: 46175, 47872, 47989
- Area code: 765
- GNIS feature ID: 453350

Greene Township is one of thirteen townships in Parke County, Indiana, United States. As of the 2020 census, its population was 413 and it contained 181 housing units.

Historical population
Census	Pop.	Note	%±
1890	1,126		—
1900	1,077		−4.4%
1910	1,009		−6.3%
1920	981		−2.8%
1930	805		−17.9%
1940	758		−5.8%
1950	616		−18.7%
1960	502		−18.5%
1970	470		−6.4%
1980	524		11.5%
1990	416		−20.6%
2000	439		5.5%
2010	423		−3.6%
2020	413		−2.4%
Source: US Decennial Census

== History ==
The Portland Mills Bridge was listed on the National Register of Historic Places in 1978.

== Geography ==
According to the 2010 census, the township has a total area of 35.65 square miles (92.3 km^{2}), of which 35.55 square miles (92.1 km^{2}) (or 99.72%) is land and 0.09 square miles (0.23 km^{2}) (or 0.25%) is water.

=== Unincorporated towns ===
- Guion at 39.842820°N 87.111400°W
- Milligan at 39.845599°N 87.038344°W
- Parkeville at 39.816987°N 87.084456°W

(This list is based on USGS data and may include former settlements.)

=== Cemeteries ===
The township contains these nine cemeteries: Bruin, Clodfelter, Jarvis, Lane, Mount Moriah, Philadelphia, Raccoon, Seybold and Spencer.

== School districts ==
- North Central Parke Community School Corporation

== Political districts ==
- State House District 44
- State Senate District 38
