= Daseke =

US trucking company

Daseke, Inc.
- Type: Subsidiary
- Industry: Transportation
- Founded: 2008; 18 years ago
- Founder: Don Daseke
- Headquarters: Addison, Texas, U.S.
- Area served: North America
- Services: Flatbed Trucking, Specialized Trucking Services
- Number of employees: 4,500+
- Parent: TFI International (2024–present)
- Website: daseke.com

Daseke, Inc. (/ˈdæski/ DASS-kee), a subsidiary of TFI International, is an American flatbed and specialized transportation company, comprising 16 operating companies with over 5,200 trucks and over 11,000 flatbed and specialized trailers.

== Overview ==
The Daseke axis of companies includes Smokey Point Distributing, E.W. Wylie, J. Grady Randolph, Central Oregon Truck Company, Lone Star Transportation, Bulldog Hiway Express, Hornady Transportation, and The Boyd Companies (including Boyd Bros. Transportation and WTI Transport).

Furthermore, it also offers its services to The Schilli Companies, Big Freight Systems, The Steelman Companies, The Roadmaster Group, TSH & Co. (Tennessee Steel Haulers), Moore Freight Service, Inc, Aveda Transportation and Energy Services, and Builders Transportation Co.

== History ==
In 2008, Don Daseke began expanding his operations with the purchase of Smokey Point Distributing (SPD), which focuses in hauling large, cumbersome, aviation-related cargo. In 2011, Daseke added E. W. Wylie, a company with a large amount of business in Canada.

Two years later, in 2013, J. Grady Randolph (JGR), a four-generation, family-owned South Carolinian carrier joined Daseke. Three months later, Daseke added Central Oregon Truck Company (COTC). By November 2013, Daseke merged with The Boyd Companies, a carrier with four companies under its umbrella: Boyd Bros. Transportation, WTI Transport, Mid Seven Transportation and Boyd Logistics.

2014 saw the addition of Lone Star Transportation, a Fort Worth carrier with a presence in Mexico. Bulldog Hiway Express, led by former American Trucking Associations Chairman, Phil Byrd, and Hornady Transportation, an Alabama trucking company established in 1928, the oldest company to join to date, both joined the Daseke family in 2015.

In 2017, Big Freight Systems became the first Canadian company to join Daseke. The Schilli Companies, which are Schilli Transportation Services, Schilli Specialized and Schilli Distribution, joined simultaneously and provide warehousing and logistics. In July, The Steelman Companies (Steelman Transportation and Group One Inc.) joined Daseke and are led by President and CEO Jim Towery. To end 2017 strong, December brought three more companies to the Daseke family - The Roadmaster Group, TSH & Co. and Moore Freight Service, Inc. The Roadmaster Group is a family of specialized transportation companies who serve the high security market - MCF is a key contributor. TSH & Co. (Tennessee Steel Haulers & Company), is one of the largest flatbed haulers in the region, hauling primarily steel and industrial materials. Daseke also added Moore Freight Service, Inc, which is a comprehensive freight service company specializing in flat glass transportation.

Daseke acquired two additional companies in 2018, Aveda Transportation and Energy Service and Builders Transportation Co. Aveda is one of the largest providers of specialized transportation services and equipment required for the exploration, development and production of petroleum resources in the U.S. and Canada, and Builders Transportation Co. is a fleet of over 300 company trucks and 500 spread-axle trailers focused on traditional flatbed operations through the 48 contiguous states, hauling coil steel, wire products, structural and sheet steel, aluminum products, building materials, cast iron, steel pipe and machinery.

In 2018, Bharat Mahajan was appointed as the chief financial officer for Daseke. In addition to this appointment, Daseke announced Chris Easter as the chief operations officer early in 2019.

In December 2023, it was announced that Daseke would be acquired by TFI International Inc., a Canadian carrier, for $1.1 billion. The transaction closed on April 1, 2024.

== Business milestones ==
- Smokey Point Distributing joined Daseke on December 31, 2008.
- E.W. Wylie joined Daseke on December 29, 2011.
- J. Grady Randolph joined Daseke on June 1, 2013.
- Central Oregon Truck Company joined Daseke on August 1, 2013.
- The Boyd Companies joined Daseke on November 1, 2013.
- Lone Star Transportation joined Daseke on October 1, 2014.
- Bulldog Hiway Express joined Daseke on July 1, 2015.
- Hornady Transportation joined Daseke on August 1, 2015.
- Daseke Inc. becomes publicly listed with the Nasdaq ticker symbol DSKE, February 28, 2017.
- Schilli Transportation Services joined Daseke on May 1, 2017.
- Big Freight Systems joined Daseke on May 1, 2017.
- The Steelman Companies joined Daseke on July 3, 2017.
- The Roadmaster Group joined Daseke on December 4, 2017.
- The Tennessee Steel Haulers & Company (TSH & Co.) joined Daseke on December 4, 2017.
- Moore Freight Services, Inc. joined Daseke on December 4, 2017.
- Aveda Transportation and Energy Services joined Daseke on June 6, 2018.
- Builders Transportation Co. joined Daseke on August 2, 2018.

== Operating companies ==
- Smokey Point Distributing – SPD was founded in 1979, offering aviation-related and time-sensitive cargo transportation featuring flatbeds, flatbed stretches, single drop, double drop RGN, double drop stretches, lowboy RGN, flatbed retractable curtain, step-deck retractable curtain, low profile step-deck retractable curtain trailers. Smokey Point also offers a significant asset light trucking brokerage service.
- E. W. Wylie – Founded in 1938, specializing in high-value and over-dimensional freight with their fleet of flatbed and step-deck trailers.
- J. Grady Randolph – Founded in 1935, specializing in carrying over-dimensional flatbed cargo.
- Central Oregon Truck Company – Founded in 1992, Central Oregon Truck Company offers logistical services, long haul regional and services throughout the U.S. and Canada via their fleet of company owned open and retractable curtained flatbed trailers.
- The Boyd Companies – Founded in 1956, Boyd Companies is made up of Boyd Bros. Transportation, WTI Transport, Mid Seven Transportation and Boyd Logistics.
  - Boyd Bros. Transportation - Founded in 1956, Boyd Bros. Transportation specializes in high volume, time-sensitive flatbed services throughout the eastern two-thirds of the United States.
  - WTI Transport - Founded in 1989, WTI is primarily an owner operator fleet focused in the transportation of roofing, building materials, aluminum, iron and steel.
  - Mid Seven Transportation - Founded in 1947, is an open-deck carrier specializing in the transportation of machinery, steel and building materials throughout the contiguous 48 states.
  - Boyd Logistics - Founded in 2000, Boyd Logistics offers shippers a trucking network for supply chain management and represents several thousand carriers and trucking companies across the U.S.
- Lone Star Transportation – Founded in 1988, Lone Star specializes in time-sensitive transportation of aerospace parts, renewable energy (wind turbines and blades), building and construction materials, heavy equipment and large logistical projects.
- Bulldog Hiway Express – Founded in 1959, Bulldog Hiway specializes in intermodal port deliveries and heavy hauls with loads reaching 180,000 pounds with an emphasis on the automotive and energy sectors, including wind, solar and nuclear power via 48’ 102’ flatbeds, 2-axle and 1-axle step decks and extendable RGN.
- Hornady Transportation - Founded in 1928, Hornady is company that supports the building products and steel industries via tractors and flatbed trailers.
- Big Freight Systems - Founded in 1948, Big Freight Systems is a Canadian company that is a full-service provider of transportation, logistics and warehousing. Big Freight Systems covers all Canadian provinces and regularly services clients in 19 U.S. states.
- The Schilli Companies - Founded in 1961, The Schilli Companies consist of four companies, including Schilli Transportation Services; Schilli Specialized; Schilli Distribution Services; and Schilli National Lease, a member of National Lease. They operate warehouses and distribution centers located throughout the Eastern half of the United States.
- The Steelman Companies - Founded in 1991, The Steelman Companies, which includes Group One Inc., carry a diverse freight mix throughout North America. They handle standard flatbed freight, over-dimensional loads, and specialized equipment, and offer brokerage and logistics services
- The Roadmaster Group - The Roadmaster Group's Tri-State Motor Transit Co. — the oldest munitions transporter in the United States and the crown jewel in The Roadmaster Group's family - dates back to 1931. Now, The Roadmaster Group is one of the largest arms, ammunition and explosives, or AA&E, hauling company in the United States.
- TSH & Co. - Founded in 1977, TSH & Co. includes Alabama Carriers Inc. and Fleet Movers Inc., has more than 1,100 trucks under its authority. Combined, they are one of the largest flatbed haulers in the region, hauling primarily steel and industrial materials.
- Moore Freight Service, Inc. - Founded in 2001, Moore Freight Service, Inc is based in Mascot, Tennessee and specialize in hauling glass.
- Aveda Transportation and Energy Services - Aveda was incorporated in 1994 as a private company to serve the oil and gas industry. Aveda is one of the largest providers of specialized transportation services and equipment required for the exploration, development and production of petroleum resources in the U.S. and Canada. Its services focus on the specialized hauling of large oil rigs and worksite equipment.
- Builders Transportation Co. - Builders operates a fleet of more than 300 company trucks and nearly 500 spread-axle trailers, hauling mostly in the eastern two-thirds of the United States. The company is solely focused on traditional flatbed operations through the 48 contiguous states, hauling coil steel, wire products, structural and sheet steel, aluminum products, building materials, cast iron, steel pipe and machinery.
