= Judson, Parke County, Indiana =

Unincorporated community in Indiana, United States

Judson
- Unincorporated community and Census-designated place
- Parke County's location in Indiana

- Location in Parke County
- Coordinates: 39°48′49″N 87°08′09″W
- Country: United States
- State: Indiana
- County: Parke
- Township: Washington
- Elevation: 607 ft (185 m)
- Time zone: UTC-5 (Eastern (EST))
  - Summer (DST): UTC-4 (EDT)
- ZIP code: 47872
- Area code: 765
- GNIS feature ID: 2830489

Judson, also called Buchanan or Buchanans Springs, is an unincorporated community and census-designated place in Washington Township, Parke County, in the U.S. state of Indiana.

== History ==
Judson was platted in 1872. The community bears the name of Adoniram Judson, a Baptist missionary. A post office has been in operation at Judson since 1872.
