= Coloma, Indiana =

Unincorporated community in Indiana, United States

- Unincorporated community
- Parke County's location in Indiana

- Location in Park County
- Coordinates: 39°47′18″N 87°17′31″W
- Country: United States
- State: Indiana
- County: Parke
- Township: Reserve
- Elevation: 617 ft (188 m)
- Time zone: UTC-5 (Eastern (EST))
  - Summer (DST): UTC-4 (EDT)
- ZIP code: 47872
- Area code: 765
- GNIS feature ID: 432807

Coloma, also known as Rocky Run, is an unincorporated community in Reserve Township, Parke County, in the U.S. state of Indiana.

== History ==
Coloma was laid out in 1876. The community supposedly was named after Coloma, California. A post office was established at Coloma in 1868, and remained in operation until it was discontinued in 1905.
