= Byron, Parke County, Indiana =

Unincorporated community in Indiana, United States

Byron
- Unincorporated community
- Parke County's location in Indiana

- Location in Park County
- Coordinates: 39°54′13″N 87°06′20″W
- Country: United States
- State: Indiana
- County: Parke
- Township: Howard
- Elevation: 761 ft (232 m)
- Time zone: UTC-5 (Eastern (EST))
  - Summer (DST): UTC-4 (EDT)
- ZIP code: 47859
- Area code: 765
- GNIS feature ID: 431926

Byron is an unincorporated community in Howard Township, Parke County, in the U.S. state of Indiana.

== History ==
A post office was established at Byron in 1884, and remained in operation until 1905. The community probably bears the name of Lord Byron.

== Geography ==
Byron is located at 39°54′13″N 87°06′20″W at an elevation of 761 feet.
