= Numa, Indiana =

Unincorporated community in Indiana, United States

- Unincorporated community
- Parke County's location in Indiana

- Location in Parke County
- Coordinates: 39°37′51″N 87°22′13″W
- Country: United States
- State: Indiana
- County: Parke
- Township: Florida
- Elevation: 522 ft (159 m)
- Time zone: UTC-5 (Eastern (EST))
  - Summer (DST): UTC-4 (EDT)
- ZIP code: 47874
- Area code: 765
- GNIS feature ID: 440366

Numa, also known as Walkers Bluff or Walkerton, is an unincorporated community in Florida Township, Parke County, in the U.S. state of Indiana.

== History ==
Numa was laid out in 1837. According to Ronald L. Baker, the community may be named after Numa Pompilius. A post office was established at Numa in 1844, and remained in operation until it was discontinued in 1889.

== Geography ==
Numa is located at 39°37′51″N 87°22′13″W at an elevation of 525 feet.
