= Hudnut, Indiana =

Unincorporated community in Indiana, United States

- Unincorporated community
- Parke County's location in Indiana

- Location in Parke County
- Coordinates: 39°39′34″N 87°22′37″W
- Country: United States
- State: Indiana
- County: Parke
- Township: Florida
- Elevation: 495 ft (151 m)
- Time zone: UTC-5 (Eastern (EST))
  - Summer (DST): UTC-4 (EDT)
- ZIP code: 47874
- Area code: 765
- GNIS feature ID: 436569

Hudnut, also known as Clinton Locks, is an unincorporated community in western Florida Township, Parke County, in the U.S. state of Indiana, just east of Clinton.

== History ==
A post office called Hudnut was established in 1887, and remained in operation until it was discontinued in 1893. The community derives its name from the firm of Hudnut and Company, which owned property on the Wabash and Erie Canal.

== Geography ==
Hudnut is located at 39°39′34″N 87°22′37″W at an elevation of 495 feet.
