= Howard Township =

Howard Township may refer to:

== Canada ==
- Howard Township, Ontario

== United States ==
=== Arkansas ===
- Howard Township, Conway County, Arkansas, in Conway County, Arkansas

=== Indiana ===
- Howard Township, Howard County, Indiana
- Howard Township, Parke County, Indiana
- Howard Township, Washington County, Indiana

=== Iowa ===
- Howard Township, Howard County, Iowa
- Howard Township, Story County, Iowa
- Howard Township, Tama County, Iowa
- Howard Township, Wayne County, Iowa

=== Kansas ===
- Howard Township, Elk County, Kansas
- Howard Township, Labette County, Kansas, in Labette County, Kansas

=== Michigan ===
- Howard Township, Michigan

=== Missouri ===
- Howard Township, Bates County, Missouri
- Howard Township, Gentry County, Missouri

=== Ohio ===
- Howard Township, Knox County, Ohio

=== Pennsylvania ===
- Howard Township, Pennsylvania

=== South Dakota ===
- Howard Township, Charles Mix County, South Dakota, in Charles Mix County, South Dakota
- Howard Township, Meade County, South Dakota, in Meade County, South Dakota
- Howard Township, Miner County, South Dakota, in Miner County, South Dakota
