= Atherton, Indiana =

- Unincorporated community
- Vigo County's location in Indiana

- location in Vigo County, Indiana
- Coordinates: 39°36′29″N 87°21′43″W
- Country: United States
- State: Indiana
- County: Vigo County
- Township: Otter Creek
- Elevation: 528 ft (161 m)
- Time zone: UTC-5 (Eastern (EST))
  - Summer (DST): UTC-4 (EDT)
- ZIP code: 47874
- Area code: 765
- GNIS feature ID: 430321

Atherton is an unincorporated community at an elevation of 528 feet in northern Otter Creek Township, Vigo County, in the U.S. state of Indiana. It is part of the Terre Haute metropolitan area.

== History ==
Atherton was laid out and platted on October 7, 1871. The original plat was signed by Newton Rogers, Sarah A. Denny and Mary J. Rogers. The line of the north part of the plat marked the dividing line between Vigo County and Parke County. The early town was laid out around Atherton's railroad station.

A post office was established at Atherton in 1881 and remained in operation until it was discontinued in 1934.

== West Atherton ==
This unincorporated community lies in southwestern Florida Township, Parke County, in the U.S. state of Indiana. Its name comes from its eponymous location west of Atherton. By 1908 it had 20 platted lots though few, if any, were actually developed. the West Atherton Service Station opened in the community on Route 41 in 1938. Five years later, a pastor drove the five miles from Rosedale west to the community to commit suicide.
