= Parkeville, Indiana =

Unincorporated community in Indiana, United States

- Unincorporated community
- Parke County's location in Indiana

- Location in Parke County
- Coordinates: 39°49′01″N 87°05′04″W
- Country: United States
- State: Indiana
- County: Parke
- Township: Greene
- Elevation: 692 ft (211 m)
- Time zone: UTC-5 (Eastern (EST))
  - Summer (DST): UTC-4 (EDT)
- ZIP code: 47872
- Area code: 765
- GNIS feature ID: 452153

Parkeville is an unincorporated community in Greene Township, Parke County, in the U.S. state of Indiana.

== History ==
Parkeville was platted in 1837. The community took its name from Parke County. A post office was established as Parkville in 1852 and remained in operation until it was discontinued in 1902.

== Geography ==
Parkeville is located at 39°49′01″N 87°05′04″W.
