= Klondyke, Parke County, Indiana =

Unincorporated community in Indiana, United States

Klondyke
- Unincorporated community
- Parke County's location in Indiana

- Location in Parke County
- Coordinates: 39°47′28″N 87°20′21″W
- Country: United States
- State: Indiana
- County: Parke
- Township: Reserve
- Elevation: 545 ft (166 m)
- Time zone: UTC-5 (Eastern (EST))
  - Summer (DST): UTC-4 (EDT)
- ZIP code: 47862
- Area code: 765
- GNIS feature ID: 437382

Klondyke is an unincorporated community in southern Reserve Township, Parke County, in the U.S. state of Indiana.

== History ==
Klondyke was founded in 1907, and probably was so named in commemoration of the Klondike Gold Rush.

== Geography ==
Klondyke is located at 39°47′28″N 87°20′21″W at an elevation of 545 feet.
