= Jessup, Indiana =

Unincorporated community in Indiana, United States

- Unincorporated community
- Parke County's location in Indiana

- Location in Parke County
- Coordinates: 39°39′26″N 87°15′24″W
- Country: United States
- State: Indiana
- County: Parke
- Township: Florida
- Elevation: 528 ft (161 m)
- Time zone: UTC-5 (Eastern (EST))
  - Summer (DST): UTC-4 (EDT)
- ZIP code: 47874
- Area code: 765
- GNIS feature ID: 437002

Jessup or Jessups Station is an unincorporated community in Florida Township, Parke County, in the U.S. state of Indiana.

== History ==
A post office was established at Jessup in 1867, and remained in operation until 1948. The community was named for one Mr. Jessup, an early settler and old resident of the community.

== Geography ==
Jessup is located at 39°39′26″N 87°15′24″W at an elevation of 531 feet.
