= Guion, Indiana =

Unincorporated community in Indiana, United States

- Unincorporated community
- Parke County's location in Indiana

- Location in Parke County
- Coordinates: 39°50′34″N 87°06′41″W
- Country: United States
- State: Indiana
- County: Parke
- Township: Greene
- Elevation: 660 ft (200 m)
- Time zone: UTC-5 (Eastern (EST))
  - Summer (DST): UTC-4 (EDT)
- ZIP code: 47872 (Post Office: Rockville)
- Area code: 765
- GNIS feature ID: 435552

Guion (also known as Bruens Crossroads, Bruins or Cross Roads) is an unincorporated community in Greene Township, Parke County, in the U.S. state of Indiana. It is near the western intersection of Indiana State Road 59 and Indiana State Road 236.

== History ==
Guion was platted in 1882. The community was named in honor of William Howe Guion, a railroad promoter. A post office was established at Guion in 1878, and remained in operation until it was discontinued in 1943.

== Geography ==
Guion is located at 39°50′34″N 87°06′41″W at an elevation of 656 feet.
