= Washington Township, Parke County, Indiana =

Washington Township
- Township
- Location in Parke County
- Coordinates: 39°49′42″N 87°10′39″W
- Country: United States
- State: Indiana
- County: Parke

Government
  - Type: Indiana township

Area
  - Total: 36.13 sq mi (93.6 km^{2})
  - Land: 35.95 sq mi (93.1 km^{2})
  - Water: 0.18 sq mi (0.47 km^{2}) 0.50%
- Elevation: 732 ft (223 m)

Population (2020)
  - Total: 1,412
  - Density: 39.28/sq mi (15.16/km^{2})
- Time zone: UTC-5 (Eastern (EST))
  - Summer (DST): UTC-4 (EDT)
- ZIP codes: 47832, 47856, 47859, 47872
- Area code: 765
- GNIS feature ID: 454012

Washington Township is one of thirteen townships in Parke County, Indiana, United States. As of the 2020 census, its population was 1,412 and it contained 478 housing units.

Historical population
Census	Pop.	Note	%±
1890	1,641		—
1900	1,682		2.5%
1910	1,481		−12.0%
1920	1,355		−8.5%
1930	1,162		−14.2%
1940	1,201		3.4%
1950	1,051		−12.5%
1960	1,018		−3.1%
1970	961		−5.6%
1980	1,017		5.8%
1990	904		−11.1%
2000	1,142		26.3%
2010	1,302		14.0%
2020	1,412		8.4%
Source: US Decennial Census

== History ==
The Sanitorium Covered Bridge was listed on the National Register of Historic Places in 1978.

== Geography ==
According to the 2010 census, the township has a total area of 36.13 square miles (93.6 km^{2}), of which 35.95 square miles (93.1 km^{2}) (or 99.50%) is land and 0.18 square miles (0.47 km^{2}) (or 0.50%) is water.

=== Cities, towns, villages ===
- Marshall

=== Census-designated places ===
- Judson at 39.813098°N 87.134457°W

=== Unincorporated communities ===
- Nyesville at 39.784486°N 87.174458°W

(This list is based on USGS data and may include former settlements.)

=== Cemeteries ===
The township contains these seven cemeteries: Barnes, Bethany, Buchanan, Elder, Overman, Poplar and Rawlings.

=== Major highways ===
- U.S. Route 41

== School districts ==
- North Central Parke Community School Corporation
- Formerly: Turkey Run Community School Corporation

== Political districts ==
- State House District 44
- State Senate District 38
