= Reserve Township, Parke County, Indiana =

Reserve Township
- Township
- Location in Parke County
- Coordinates: 39°49′35″N 87°20′18″W
- Country: United States
- State: Indiana
- County: Parke

Government
  - Type: Indiana township

Area
  - Total: 25.44 sq mi (65.9 km^{2})
  - Land: 25.1 sq mi (65 km^{2})
  - Water: 0.33 sq mi (0.85 km^{2}) 1.30%
- Elevation: 620 ft (190 m)

Population (2020)
  - Total: 1,297
  - Density: 51.7/sq mi (20.0/km^{2})
- Time zone: UTC-5 (Eastern (EST))
  - Summer (DST): UTC-4 (EDT)
- ZIP codes: 47832, 47862, 47872, 47952
- Area code: 765
- GNIS feature ID: 453787

Reserve Township is one of thirteen townships in Parke County, Indiana, United States. As of the 2020 census, its population was 1,297 and it contained 596 housing units.

Historical population
Census	Pop.	Note	%±
1890	1,346		—
1900	1,898		41.0%
1910	2,224		17.2%
1920	1,752		−21.2%
1930	1,820		3.9%
1940	1,851		1.7%
1950	1,613		−12.9%
1960	1,579		−2.1%
1970	1,562		−1.1%
1980	1,635		4.7%
1990	1,444		−11.7%
2000	1,515		4.9%
2010	1,423		−6.1%
2020	1,297		−8.9%
Source: US Decennial Census

== History ==
Reserve Township was so named on account of its territory once being part of an Indian reservation.

The Melcher Covered Bridge was listed on the National Register of Historic Places in 1978.

== Geography ==
According to the 2010 census, the township has a total area of 25.44 square miles (65.9 km^{2}), of which 25.1 square miles (65 km^{2}) (or 98.66%) is land and 0.33 square miles (0.85 km^{2}) (or 1.30%) is water.

=== Cities, towns, villages ===
- Montezuma (vast majority)

=== Unincorporated towns ===
- Coloma at 39.788373°N 87.291959°W
- Klondyke at 39.79115°N 87.339183°W
- West Union at 39.843650°N 87.336682°W

(This list is based on USGS data and may include former settlements.)

=== Extinct towns ===
- Melcher at 39.792817°N 87.337238°W

(These towns are listed as "historical" by the USGS.)

=== Cemeteries ===
The township contains these three cemeteries: Causey, Oakland and Warner.

=== Major highways ===
- U.S. Route 36

== School districts ==
- Southwest Parke Community School Corporation

== Political districts ==
- State House District 42
- State Senate District 38
