= Don Daseke =

American businessman

Don R. Daseke
- Born: 1940 or 1941 (age 85–86)
- Education: DePauw University
- Occupation: Businessman
- Years active: 1963-current
- Known for: CEO, Daseke
- Spouse: Barbara Elliot Daseke
- Children: 3

Don Daseke (born 1940/1941) is an American businessman, and the CEO, chairman and founder of the transportation company, Daseke Since the foundation of Daseke, Inc. he has helped to grow the company from $30 million in revenue in 2009 to an over $1.6 billion in 2018. In February 2017 Daseke became publicly listed on the Nasdaq stock exchange with the ticker symbol DSKE.

Previously, Daseke held various positions at IBM and founded the companies Walden Residential Properties, BigFatWow! Inc., Sage Telecom and East Teak International Inc.

== Early life and education ==
Daseke graduated from DePauw University in 1961 with a degree in economics. He then attended the University of Chicago School of Business and received his MBA and CPA in 1963.

== Career ==
Daseke began his career with Arthur Andersen as an auditor. He then moved to IBM and held roles in sales and finance. In 1972, he founded the company Walden Residential Properties. During his tenure as CEO with the company he helped to grow it from 6,000 units to 42,000 units and oversaw its IPO in 1994. The company was sold for $1.7 billion in 2000.

Daseke served as a founding chairman for Sage Telecom beginning in 1998. Daseke founded the company BigFatWow, a shopping mall internet kiosk operator in 1999. The company ceased operations in 2002. In 2006, Daseke purchased the East Teak Trading Group and founded East Teak International, Inc., a teak and hardwood importer.

In 2008, Daseke purchased the trucking company Smokey Point Distributing, the first company of Daseke Inc. By 2013, the company had a revenue of $205 million, up from $30 million in 2009. In January 2014, under Daseke, the company had merged six trucking company subsidiaries that focused on the transportation of flatbed and specialized cargo. In 2014, Daseke was named an Entrepreneur of the Year for the Southwestern Region by Ernst & Young. By 2015, three more companies were acquired by the company and Daseke had grown the company to 3,000 employees with a projected revenue of $750 million and nine subsidiaries. In 2017, Daseke acquired seven companies, making them the leading consolidator and largest flatbed and specialized company in North America. Daseke's efforts growing the company didn't go unnoticed, Don Daseke was named The Accidental Trucker and Daseke was the public company honoree for the 2017 Dallas Business Journal Outstanding Director Awards. In December 2018, Don Daseke was selected for the 2018 Horatio Alger Award for his lifetime achievements and commitment to his local community.

Daseke has also served as a chairman at Sage Telecom Inc., Mirage Systems Inc., Priority Flowers Inc., ApartmentMatching.com, Netier Technologies Inc. and Liquid Motors Inc.
