= Rosedale, Indiana =

- Town
- Location of Rosedale in Parke County, Indiana.

- Location in Parke County
- Coordinates: 39°37′26″N 87°16′54″W
- Country: United States
- State: Indiana
- County: Parke
- Township: Florida

Area
  - Total: 0.39 sq mi (1.02 km^{2})
  - Land: 0.39 sq mi (1.02 km^{2})
  - Water: 0 sq mi (0.00 km^{2})
- Elevation: 532 ft (162 m)

Population (2020)
  - Total: 636
  - Density: 1,611.0/sq mi (622.01/km^{2})
- Time zone: UTC-5 (Eastern (EST))
  - Summer (DST): UTC-4 (EDT)
- ZIP code: 47874
- Area code: 765
- FIPS code: 18-65934
- GNIS feature ID: 2396889
- Website: townofrosedale.in.gov

Rosedale is a town in Florida Township, Parke County, in the U.S. state of Indiana. The population was 636 at the 2020 census.

== History ==
When Parke County was established in 1821, Rosedale was the first village in the county, and served as the first county seat. The town was named for Chauncey Rose, a pioneer who settled in this township in 1819. Later the county seat was moved to Armiesburg, and then in 1822 to Rockville (where it remained). The first court session in the county was held in Roseville. The town flourished until 1835 when more business began to be drawn to Rockville. In 1861, the post office was established in Rosedale, where it is still currently operating.

== Geography ==
Rosedale is located near the southern border of the county, about 10 miles (16 km) from the county seat of Rockville, and less than 1 mile (1.6 km) south of Big Raccoon Creek.

According to the 2010 census, Rosedale has a total area of 0.39 square miles (1.01 km^{2}), all land.

== Demographics ==
Historical population
Census	Pop.	Note	%±
1880	207		—
1890	873		321.7%
1900	865		−0.9%
1910	1,166		34.8%
1920	741		−36.4%
1930	657		−11.3%
1940	712		8.4%
1950	673		−5.5%
1960	726		7.9%
1970	817		12.5%
1980	744		−8.9%
1990	783		5.2%
2000	750		−4.2%
2010	725		−3.3%
2020	636		−12.3%
U.S. Decennial Census

=== 2020 census ===
As of the census of 2020, there 636 people, 311 housing units, with only 267 being occupied. The population density was 1,610.13 inhabitants per square mile (621.7/km^{2}). The racial makeup of the town was 95.9% white, 0.79% Native American, 0.16% Asian, 0.47% Black, 1.3% Hispanic or Latino, 0.62% from other races, 1.9% from two or more races.

The median age in the town was 41.5 years. 20.9% of residents were under the age of 18; 7.2% were between the ages of 18 and 24; 24,9% were from 25 to 44; 27.9% were from 45 to 64; and 19.1% were 65 years or older. The gender makeup of the town was 43.5% male and 56.5% female.

The rate of poverty is 15.4%, with 32.7% of people 18 years or younger being impoverished, 12.7% of people ages 18 to 64, and 4.9% of people over the age of 64. The median income is $57,188. 15.5% of the population had a bachelor's degree or higher.

=== 2010 census ===
As of the census of 2010, there were 725 people, 287 households, and 196 families living in the town. The population density was 1,812.5 inhabitants per square mile (699.8/km^{2}). There were 332 housing units at an average density of 830.0 per square mile (320.5/km^{2}). The racial makeup of the town was 98.2% White, 0.1% Native American, 0.1% from other races, and 1.5% from two or more races. Hispanic or Latino of any race were 1.1% of the population.

There were 287 households, of which 36.9% had children under the age of 18 living with them, 44.3% were married couples living together, 19.2% had a female householder with no husband present, 4.9% had a male householder with no wife present, and 31.7% were non-families. 27.5% of all households were made up of individuals, and 10.8% had someone living alone who was 65 years of age or older. The average household size was 2.53 and the average family size was 2.96.

The median age in the town was 36.4 years. 27.2% of residents were under the age of 18; 7.7% were between the ages of 18 and 24; 26.2% were from 25 to 44; 26% were from 45 to 64; and 12.8% were 65 years of age or older. The gender makeup of the town was 46.3% male and 53.7% female.

=== 2000 census ===
As of the census of 2000, there were 750 people, 304 households, and 210 families living in the town. The population density was 1,890.6 inhabitants per square mile (730.0/km^{2}). There were 322 housing units at an average density of 811.7 per square mile (313.4/km^{2}). The racial makeup of the town was 99.60% White, 0.13% African American, 0.13% Native American and 0.13% Asian.

There were 304 households, out of which 36.5% had children under the age of 18 living with them, 51.6% were married couples living together, 12.5% had a female householder with no husband present, and 30.9% were non-families. 28.9% of all households were made up of individuals, and 15.8% had someone living alone who was 65 years of age or older. The average household size was 2.47 and the average family size was 2.99.

In the town, the population was spread out, with 28.1% under the age of 18, 9.7% from 18 to 24, 28.8% from 25 to 44, 18.5% from 45 to 64, and 14.8% who were 65 years of age or older. The median age was 33 years. For every 100 females, there were 92.8 males. For every 100 females age 18 and over, there were 87.2 males.

The median income for a household in the town was $34,519, and the median income for a family was $40,556. Males had a median income of $33,000 versus $18,750 for females. The per capita income for the town was $15,301. About 11.0% of families and 14.0% of the population were below the poverty line, including 21.0% of those under age 18 and 14.8% of those age 65 or over.

== Education ==
It is in the Southwest Parke Community School Corporation.
