= Howard Township, Parke County, Indiana =

Howard Township
- Township
- Location in Parke County
- Coordinates: 39°54′11″N 87°07′58″W
- Country: United States
- State: Indiana
- County: Parke

Government
  - Type: Indiana township

Area
  - Total: 23.82 sq mi (61.7 km^{2})
  - Land: 23.75 sq mi (61.5 km^{2})
  - Water: 0.07 sq mi (0.18 km^{2}) 0.29%
- Elevation: 705 ft (215 m)

Population (2020)
  - Total: 382
  - Density: 16.1/sq mi (6.21/km^{2})
- Time zone: UTC-5 (Eastern (EST))
  - Summer (DST): UTC-4 (EDT)
- ZIP codes: 47859, 47872, 47989
- Area code: 765
- GNIS feature ID: 453420

Howard Township is one of thirteen townships in Parke County, Indiana, United States. As of the 2020 census, its population was 382 and it contained 162 housing units. The township includes the western end of Shades State Park and the southeast quarter of Turkey Run State Park.

Historical population
Census	Pop.	Note	%±
1890	666		—
1900	611		−8.3%
1910	473		−22.6%
1920	449		−5.1%
1930	339		−24.5%
1940	368		8.6%
1950	314		−14.7%
1960	272		−13.4%
1970	204		−25.0%
1980	226		10.8%
1990	244		8.0%
2000	324		32.8%
2010	341		5.2%
2020	382		12.0%
Source: US Decennial Census

== History ==
Howard Township was established about 1855, and named for General Howard, an early settler.

== Geography ==
According to the 2010 census, the township has a total area of 23.82 square miles (61.7 km^{2}), of which 23.75 square miles (61.5 km^{2}) (or 99.71%) is land and 0.07 square miles (0.18 km^{2}) (or 0.29%) is water.

=== Unincorporated towns ===
- Byron at 39.903654°N 87.105566°W

(This list is based on USGS data and may include former settlements.)

=== Cemeteries ===
.The township contains Lough Cemetery and Wolf Creek Cemetery.

=== Major highways ===
- Indiana State Road 47

== School districts ==
- North Central Parke Community School Corporation
- Formerly: Turkey Run Community School Corporation

== Political districts ==
- State House District 41
- State Senate District 38
