= Parke County, Indiana =

County in Indiana, United States

- County
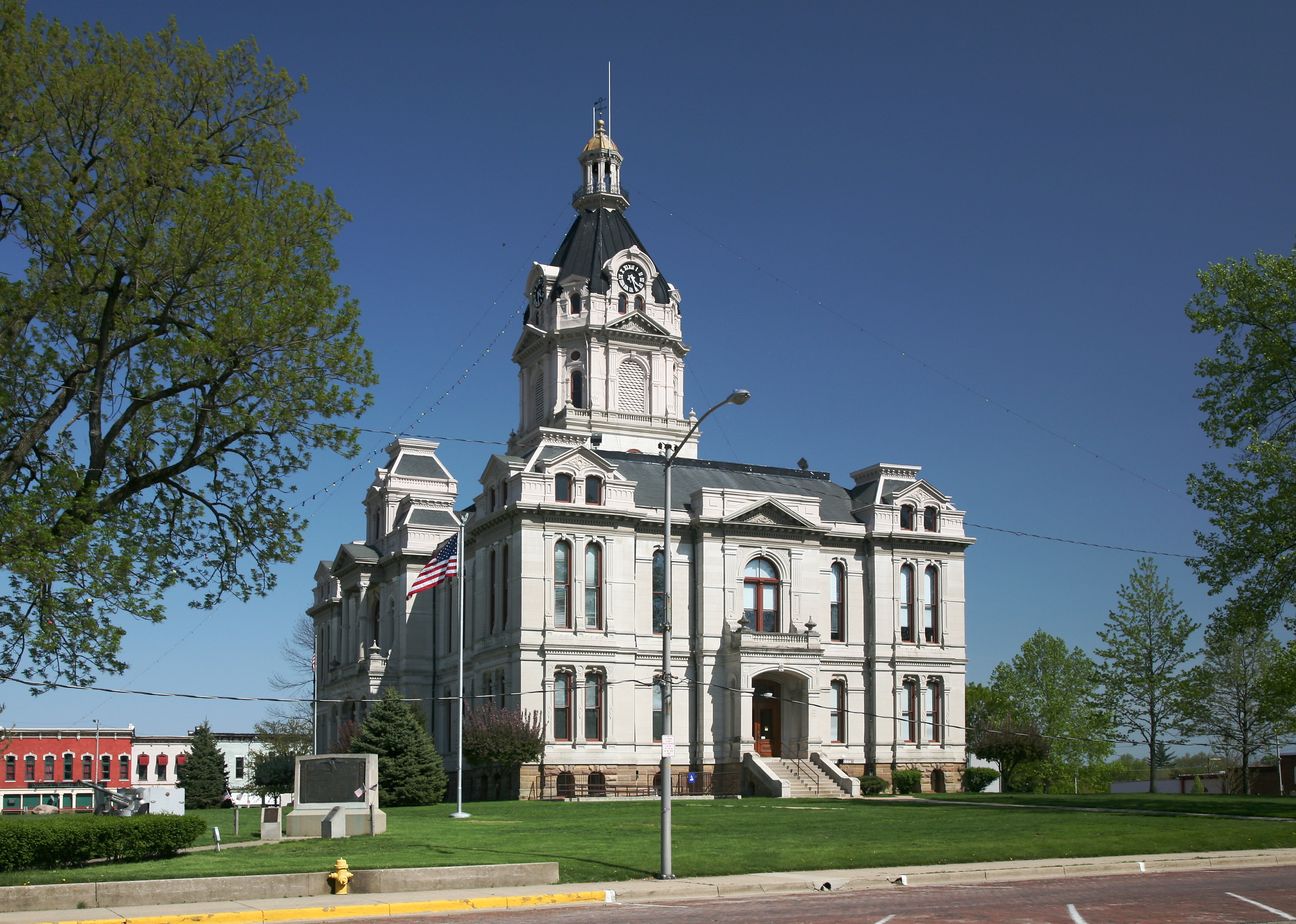
- Parke County Courthouse in Rockville, Indiana

- Location within the U.S. state of Indiana
- Coordinates: 39°47′N 87°13′W
- Country: United States
- State: Indiana
- Founded: 1821
- Named for: Benjamin Parke
- Seat: Rockville
- Largest town: Rockville

Area
  - Total: 449.98 sq mi (1,165.4 km^{2})
  - Land: 444.66 sq mi (1,151.7 km^{2})
  - Water: 5.32 sq mi (13.8 km^{2}) 1.18%

Population (2020)
  - Total: 16,156
  - Estimate (2025): 16,642 ▲
  - Density: 37.4/sq mi (14.4/km^{2})
- Time zone: UTC−5 (Eastern)
  - Summer (DST): UTC−4 (EDT)
- Congressional district: 8th
- Website: parkecounty.in.gov
- Indiana county number 61

Parke County lies in the western part of the U.S. state of Indiana along the Wabash River. The county was formed in 1821 out of a portion of Vigo County. According to the 2020 census, the population was 16,156. The county seat is Rockville. It has a population density of about 39 inhabitants per square mile (15/km^{2}). The county contains six incorporated towns and many unincorporated communities. It is divided into 13 townships which provide local services.

Two U.S. Routes and five state highways pass through or into the county, along with one major railroad line.

Parke County has 31 covered bridges and is widely referred to as the 'Covered Bridge Capital of the World'. It is the site for the Parke County Covered Bridge Festival which has been held in October each year.

Parke County is included in the Terre Haute, Indiana, Metropolitan Statistical Area.

== History ==
This area had been occupied for thousands of years by cultures of indigenous peoples. The first European settlement of the western area of Indiana along the Wabash River was by French-Canadian colonists, who founded Vincennes in 1703.

After the Seven Years' War, France ceded its territory in North America to Great Britain. In turn, after the American Revolutionary War, the Crown ceded this territory east of the Mississippi River to the new United States, including land it did not control, which was occupied by Native American nations.

In 1811 the Shawnee chief Tecumseh rallied several tribes to try to expel the European-American settlers from the area. When General William Henry Harrison took an army from Vincennes to the Battle of Tippecanoe in late 1811 to fight with the Indians, Zachariah Cicott served as a scout. Cicott had traded with Indians up and down the Wabash River, starting around 1801. The trail taken by Harrison's army, on its way to and from the battle site in Tippecanoe County, passed through the area that later became Parke County. The settlement of Armiesburg in Wabash Township was so named because Harrison and his army crossed the Raccoon Creek and camped near there on their way to the battle.

Formed on January 9, 1821, from a portion of Vigo County, Parke County was formed by an act approved by the state legislature. It was named for Captain Benjamin Parke, who commanded a troop of light Dragoons at the Battle of Tippecanoe. Parke was elected as a delegate of Indiana Territory to the U.S. Congress. In 1821, he was appointed as U.S. District Judge for Indiana.

First located at Roseville, the county seat was relocated to Armiesburg. In 1822, the county settled on Rockville as the permanent location. The state act had called for construction of county buildings to start within one year of the county's formation; but in the event, it did not start until 1824. The first courthouse was completed on the Rockville town square in 1826. The log structure doubled as a church.

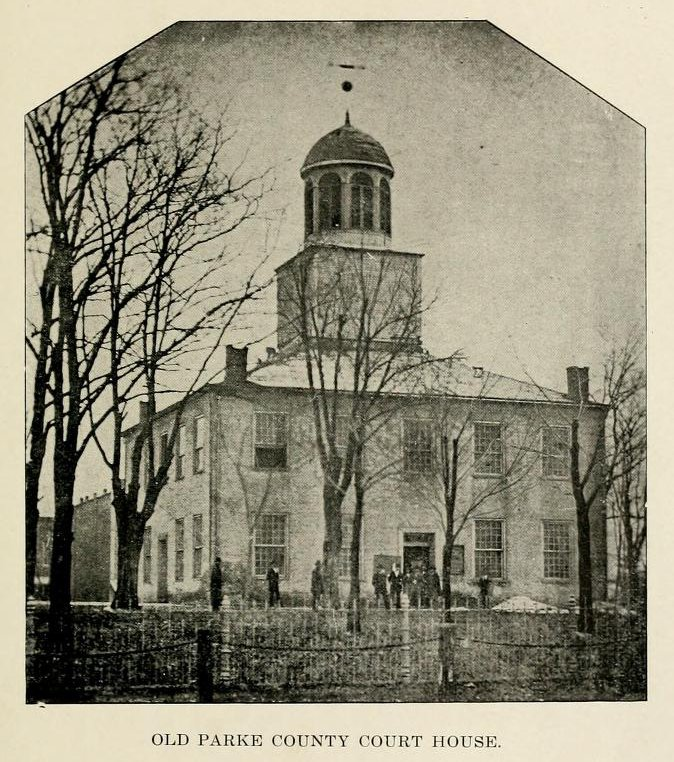
The old Parke County courthouse (1832–1879)

In 1832 the log building was replaced by a brick structure, which served for more than 40 years until 1879, when it was demolished for replacement by a new stone courthouse. The architects for this building were Thomas J. Tolan and his son Brentwood of Fort Wayne; they designed seven Indiana courthouses, as well as two in Ohio, and one each in Iowa and Illinois. (The firm also designed the Rockville sheriff's resident and jail, as well as others in Indiana, Ohio, Michigan, Illinois, Iowa and Tennessee).

Construction of the courthouse at Rockville was completed in 1882 at a cost of about $79,000. (Note: A $79,000 capital expense in 1880 would be roughly equivalent to $18,000,000 in 2010.) Items deposited in the cornerstone included documents of the town's history, postage stamps, several varieties of grain grown in the county, coins, and photographs. A dedication ceremony took place on February 22, 1882, the anniversary of George Washington's birthday. The clock and bell were added later at a cost of about $1,500.

The Wabash and Erie Canal was completed through the area around 1850 and ran through Parke County on the east side of the Wabash River. It served several communities along the banks of the river until it was discontinued in the 1870s.

== Geography ==
Map of Parke County, showing townships and settlements

Parke County lies in western Indiana about halfway between the state's north and south borders. It is bordered by Fountain County to the north; Montgomery County to the northeast; Putnam County to the east; Clay County to the south; and Vigo County to the southwest. The county's western border is defined by the Wabash River; on the west side of the river lies Vermillion County, beyond which is the state of Illinois, less than 5 miles (8.0 km) from Parke County's northwestern corner. The state capital of Indianapolis lies about 60 miles (97 km) to the east.

The entire county is within the drainage area of the Wabash River. North of Rockville, the gently undulating land is glacial till resulting from Wisconsinan glaciation. The Shelbyville moraine divides this from the nearly level Illinoisan till plain in the south part of the county.

Turkey Run State Park is located in northern Parke County. It was set aside as one of Indiana's first state parks and consists of 2,382 acres (964 ha) of land. The county also contains a portion of Shades State Park, a 3,082-acre (1,247 ha) park about 5 miles (8.0 km) northeast of Turkey Run; the majority of Shades is located in Montgomery County.

According to the 2010 census, the county has a total area of 449.98 square miles (1,165.4 km^{2}), of which 444.66 square miles (1,151.7 km^{2}) (or 98.82%) is land and 5.32 square miles (13.8 km^{2}) (or 1.18%) is water.

=== Cities and towns ===
Parke County contains six incorporated settlements. The largest is Rockville with a population of about 2,600; located near the center of the county at the intersections of U.S. Routes 36 and 41, it is also the county seat. Bloomingdale is about 5 miles (8.0 km) to the north-northwest of Rockville and has a population of 335. To the north-northeast of Rockville lies Marshall, on Indiana State Road 236; its population is 324. To the southwest of Rockville, Mecca has a population of 335. Montezuma is at the far western edge of the county on U.S. Route 36; its population is 1,022. Finally, Rosedale is near the southern border of the county and has a population of 636.

=== Census-designated places ===
- Bridgeton
- Judson
- Lyford

=== Townships ===
- Adams
- Florida
- Greene
- Howard
- Jackson
- Liberty
- Penn
- Raccoon
- Reserve
- Sugar Creek
- Union
- Wabash
- Washington

=== Unincorporated communities ===
- Annapolis
- Armiesburg
- Bellmore
- Bradfield Corner
- Byron
- Catlin
- Coloma
- Coxville
- Diamond
- Ferndale
- Grange Corner
- Guion
- Hollandsburg
- Howard
- Hudnut
- Jessup
- Keytsville‡
- Klondyke
- Lena
- Lodi
- Lusks Mills
- Mansfield
- Milligan
- Minshall
- Numa
- Nyesville
- Parkeville
- Piattsville
- Rockport
- Smockville
- Stumptown
- Sylvania
- Tangier
- Vivalia‡
- West Atherton
- West Union

=== Ghost town ===
- Coke Oven Hollow

== Demographics ==
Historical population
Census	Pop.	Note	%±
1830	7,535		—
1840	13,499		79.2%
1850	14,968		10.9%
1860	15,538		3.8%
1870	18,166		16.9%
1880	19,460		7.1%
1890	20,296		4.3%
1900	23,000		13.3%
1910	22,214		−3.4%
1920	18,875		−15.0%
1930	16,561		−12.3%
1940	17,358		4.8%
1950	15,674		−9.7%
1960	14,804		−5.6%
1970	14,600		−1.4%
1980	16,372		12.1%
1990	15,410		−5.9%
2000	17,241		11.9%
2010	17,339		0.6%
2020	16,156		−6.8%
2025 (est.)	16,642	▲	3.0%
U.S. Decennial Census:

=== Racial and ethnic composition ===
Parke County, Indiana – Racial and ethnic composition Note: the US Census treats Hispanic/Latino as an ethnic category. This table excludes Latinos from the racial categories and assigns them to a separate category. Hispanics/Latinos may be of any race.
Race / Ethnicity (NH = Non-Hispanic)	Pop 1980	Pop 1990	Pop 2000	Pop 2010	Pop 2020	% 1980	% 1990	% 2000	% 2010	% 2020
White alone (NH)	16,206	15,142	16,560	16,545	15,329	98.99%	98.26%	96.05%	95.42%	94.88%
Black or African American alone (NH)	41	117	368	391	198	0.25%	0.76%	2.13%	2.26%	1.23%
Native American or Alaska Native alone (NH)	26	40	41	53	55	0.16%	0.26%	0.24%	0.31%	0.34%
Asian alone (NH)	25	16	31	33	30	0.15%	0.10%	0.18%	0.19%	0.19%
Native Hawaiian or Pacific Islander alone (NH)	x	x	4	4	0	x	x	0.02%	0.02%	0.00%
Other race alone (NH)	4	0	14	6	12	0.02%	0.00%	0.08%	0.03%	0.07%
Mixed race or Multiracial (NH)	x	x	119	92	307	x	x	0.69%	0.53%	1.90%
Hispanic or Latino (any race)	70	95	104	215	225	0.43%	0.62%	0.60%	1.24%	1.39%
Total	16,372	15,410	17,241	17,339	16,156	100.00%	100.00%	100.00%	100.00%	100.00%

=== 2020 census ===
As of the 2020 census, the county had a population of 16,156. The median age was 41.1 years. 23.4% of residents were under the age of 18 and 19.5% of residents were 65 years of age or older. For every 100 females there were 91.0 males, and for every 100 females age 18 and over there were 85.0 males age 18 and over.

The racial makeup of the county was 95.4% White, 1.2% Black or African American, 0.4% American Indian and Alaska Native, 0.2% Asian, <0.1% Native Hawaiian and Pacific Islander, 0.6% from some other race, and 2.3% from two or more races. Hispanic or Latino residents of any race comprised 1.4% of the population.

0.6% of residents lived in urban areas, while 99.4% lived in rural areas.

There were 6,052 households in the county, of which 28.8% had children under the age of 18 living in them. Of all households, 53.4% were married-couple households, 18.5% were households with a male householder and no spouse or partner present, and 21.2% were households with a female householder and no spouse or partner present. About 27.1% of all households were made up of individuals and 13.6% had someone living alone who was 65 years of age or older.

There were 7,536 housing units, of which 19.7% were vacant. Among occupied housing units, 79.1% were owner-occupied and 20.9% were renter-occupied. The homeowner vacancy rate was 2.2% and the rental vacancy rate was 8.5%.

=== 2010 census ===
As of the 2010 United States census, there were 17,339 people, 6,222 households, and 4,389 families residing in the county. The population density was 39.0 inhabitants per square mile (15.1/km^{2}). There were 8,085 housing units at an average density of 18.2 per square mile (7.0/km^{2}). The racial makeup of the county was 96.1% white, 2.3% black or African American, 0.4% American Indian, 0.2% Asian, 0.4% from other races, and 0.6% from two or more races. Those of Hispanic or Latino origin made up 1.2% of the population. In terms of ancestry, 27.7% were American, 23.7% were German, 10.7% were Irish, and 10.1% were English.

Of the 6,222 households, 29.8% had children under the age of 18 living with them, 56.4% were married couples living together, 9.4% had a female householder with no husband present, 29.5% were non-families, and 24.8% of all households were made up of individuals. The average household size was 2.51 and the average family size was 2.97. The median age was 41.3 years.

The median income for a household in the county was $47,697 and the median income for a family was $51,581. Males had a median income of $40,395 versus $27,618 for females. The per capita income for the county was $19,494. About 8.8% of families and 15.8% of the population were below the poverty line, including 26.9% of those under age 18 and 9.3% of those age 65 or over.

== Transportation ==
Two United States highways pass through the county. U.S. Route 36 passes east–west through the middle of the county, entering from Putnam County to the east, through Rockville and Montezuma, then into Vermillion County to the west. U.S. Route 41 enters from Fountain County to the north and intersects U.S. Route 36 in Rockville; it goes southwest toward Clinton before continuing south to Vigo County and Terre Haute, Indiana.

Indiana State Road 47 begins at U.S. Route 41 in the northern part of the county and goes east into Montgomery County, veering north to Crawfordsville. Indiana State Road 59 enters from Clay County to the south and runs north through the eastern part of the county until it terminates at Indiana State Road 236, which runs east from U.S. Route 41. Indiana State Road 163 runs for less than a mile in Parke County, crossing the river at Clinton and terminating at U.S. Route 41 in the far southwest corner of the county. In the far northwestern corner, Indiana State Road 234 enters from Cayuga and runs for less than a mile to Lodi before going north and leaving the county.

A small portion of a major CSX Transportation railroad line passes through the southwest corner of the county, entering from Clinton to the west, then going south toward Terre Haute. Another CSX line enters the far southeastern corner of the county on its way from Terre Haute to Indianapolis.

== Economy ==
Historically a rural county with extensive agriculture, today Parke County's economy is supported by a labor force of approximately 8,050 workers. The unemployment rate in November 2011 was 9.6%.

== Climate and weather ==
Rockville, Indiana

Climate chart (precipitation, max. and min. temperature)
J	F	M	A	M	J	J	A	S	O	N	D
2.5 36 19	2.3 42 24	3.7 54 33	4.1 66 43	4.8 76 52	4.3 84 61	4.9 87 65	4.5 85 63	3.1 79 56	3.1 68 45	4.3 53 36	3.5 40 25
- █ Average max. and min. temperatures in °F
- █ Precipitation totals in inches
- Source: The Weather Channel
Metric conversion
J	F	M	A	M	J	J	A	S	O	N	D
65 2 −7	57 6 −4	94 12 1	104 19 6	121 24 11	108 29 16	124 31 18	114 29 17	78 26 13	77 20 7	108 12 2	89 4 −4
- █ Average max. and min. temperatures in °C
- █ Precipitation totals in mm

In recent years, average temperatures in Rockville have ranged from a low of 19 °F (−7 °C) in January to a high of 87 °F (31 °C) in July, although a record low of −25 °F (−32 °C) was recorded in January 1994 and a record high of 109 °F (43 °C) was recorded in July 1936. Average monthly precipitation ranged from 2.25 inches (57 mm) in February to 4.89 inches (124 mm) in July. From 1950 through 2009, eight tornadoes were reported in Parke County; none resulted in any deaths or injuries, but the total estimated property damage was over $280,000.

== Notable people ==
Warder Clyde Allee was born in Bloomingdale in 1885. He attended Earlham College and the University of Chicago, studying zoology and ecology and receiving his Ph.D. in 1912. He taught, conducted research, and wrote a number of books; among other accomplishments, he identified what became known as the Allee effect. He died in Gainesville, Florida, in 1955 at age 69.

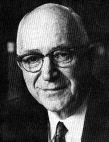
Gordon Allport

Gordon Allport was born in Montezuma in 1897; when he was six years old, his family moved to Ohio. He attended Harvard University and received a Ph.D. in psychology in 1922; his focus was on personality traits. He began teaching at Harvard in 1924, and published a number of works in the following years. He died in Cambridge, Massachusetts in 1967 at the age of 69.

William Henry Harrison Beadle was born in a log cabin in Parke County in 1838. His father offered him a farm, but he accepted $1,000 for an education instead and studied civil engineering at the University of Michigan. He fought in the Civil War on the side of the Union and became a brigadier general. After the war, he was named surveyor-general of the Dakota Territory. Later he became president of the Madison State Normal School (now Dakota State University), then taught geography there after his presidency. He died in 1915 at the age of 77.

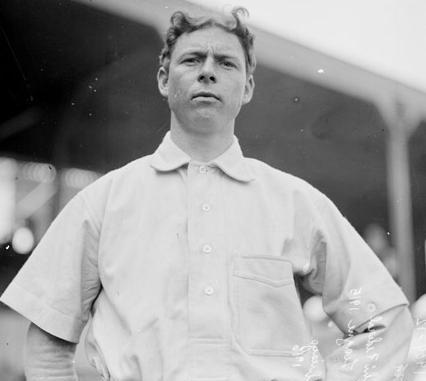
Mordecai Brown in 1904

Baseball great Mordecai Brown was born in the unincorporated town of Nyesville in Parke County on October 19, 1876. He lost parts of two fingers on his right hand in a farm machinery accident, hence his later nickname "Three Finger". He was also called "Miner" because he had worked in coal mines in western Indiana before his baseball career. He began in the minor leagues in Terre Haute in 1901 and joined the major leagues in 1903, retiring in 1916. He died in Terre Haute in 1948 at age 71.

Grover Jones was born in Rosedale in 1893 and grew up in the Terre Haute area. He became a short story writer, screenwriter, and film director, writing for over 100 films. He died in Hollywood, California, in 1940 at age 46.

Knute Cauldwell was born in Parke County and played in the early years of the National Football League.

== Media ==
The county's first newspaper was called The Wabash Herald and was published beginning in 1829. After being sold and renamed several times, it was successively called The Rockville Intelligencer, The Olive Branch, The Parke County Whig and The Rockville Republican. Several other papers came and went; as of 1912, several newspapers were published in the county: the Republican, the Tribune, the Montezuma Enterprise, and the Bloomingdale World, as well as papers printed in Rosedale and Marshall. The original Wabash Herald continues and since 1977 has been called the Parke County Sentinel.

== Government ==
The county government is a constitutional body granted specific powers by the Constitution of Indiana and the Indiana Code. The county council is the legislative branch of the county government and controls all spending and revenue collection. Representatives are elected from county districts. The council members serve four-year terms and are responsible for setting salaries, the annual budget and special spending. The council also has limited authority to impose local taxes, in the form of an income and property tax that is subject to state level approval, excise taxes and service taxes. In 2010, the county budgeted approximately $2.2 million for the district's schools and $2.8 million for other county operations and services, for a total annual budget of approximately $5 million.

The executive body of the county is made of a board of commissioners. The commissioners are elected county-wide, in staggered terms, and each serves a four-year term. One of the commissioners, typically the most senior, serves as president. The commissioners are charged with executing the acts legislated by the council, collecting revenue and managing day-to-day functions of the county government.

The county maintains a small claims court that can handle some civil cases. The judge on the court is elected to a term of four years and must be a member of the Indiana Bar Association. The judge is assisted by a constable who is elected to a four-year term. In some cases, court decisions can be appealed to the state level circuit court.

The county has several other elected offices, including sheriff, coroner, auditor, treasurer, recorder, surveyor and circuit court clerk. Each of these elected officers serves a term of four years and oversees a different part of county government. Members elected to county government positions are required to declare party affiliations and be residents of the county.

Each of the townships has a trustee who administers rural fire protection and ambulance service, provides poor relief and manages cemetery care, among other duties. The trustee is assisted in these duties by a three-member township board. The trustees and board members are elected to four-year terms.

Parke County is part of Indiana's 8th congressional district; Indiana Senate district 38; and Indiana House of Representatives districts 41, 42 and 44.

Parke County is a consistently Republican county in presidential elections, having voted for Democratic Party candidates only four times since 1888, and not at all since Lyndon B. Johnson's national landslide in 1964.

United States presidential election results for Parke County, Indiana
Year	Republican		Democratic		Third party(ies)	
Year	No.	%	No.	%	No.	%
1888	2,764	53.28%	2,159	41.62%	265	5.11%
1892	2,503	49.47%	2,013	39.78%	544	10.75%
1896	2,847	49.74%	2,777	48.52%	100	1.75%
1900	3,138	51.58%	2,630	43.23%	316	5.19%
1904	3,468	55.49%	2,176	34.82%	606	9.70%
1908	3,026	48.35%	2,707	43.25%	526	8.40%
1912	1,891	36.25%	2,031	38.93%	1,295	24.82%
1916	2,598	48.52%	2,329	43.50%	427	7.98%
1920	4,989	56.13%	3,543	39.86%	356	4.01%
1924	4,877	59.12%	2,898	35.13%	474	5.75%
1928	4,729	59.25%	3,165	39.66%	87	1.09%
1932	3,926	44.29%	4,703	53.06%	235	2.65%
1936	4,665	48.89%	4,811	50.42%	66	0.69%
1940	5,242	54.14%	4,384	45.28%	57	0.59%
1944	4,751	59.03%	3,241	40.27%	56	0.70%
1948	4,326	53.33%	3,681	45.38%	105	1.29%
1952	5,069	58.33%	3,574	41.13%	47	0.54%
1956	5,080	59.04%	3,502	40.70%	22	0.26%
1960	4,662	57.94%	3,361	41.77%	23	0.29%
1964	3,570	46.84%	4,034	52.93%	17	0.22%
1968	3,738	52.47%	2,472	34.70%	914	12.83%
1972	5,014	69.16%	2,207	30.44%	29	0.40%
1976	3,929	55.00%	3,158	44.20%	57	0.80%
1980	4,595	62.82%	2,432	33.25%	288	3.94%
1984	5,052	69.26%	2,205	30.23%	37	0.51%
1988	4,458	63.21%	2,563	36.34%	32	0.45%
1992	2,953	41.60%	2,429	34.22%	1,717	24.19%
1996	3,151	47.61%	2,453	37.06%	1,015	15.33%
2000	3,841	59.58%	2,481	38.48%	125	1.94%
2004	4,550	65.27%	2,362	33.88%	59	0.85%
2008	3,909	55.92%	2,924	41.83%	157	2.25%
2012	4,234	64.85%	2,110	32.32%	185	2.83%
2016	4,863	73.28%	1,441	21.71%	332	5.00%
2020	5,400	76.90%	1,503	21.40%	119	1.69%
2024	5,158	77.52%	1,371	20.60%	125	1.88%

== Education ==
School districts include Clay Community Schools, North Central Parke Community School Corporation, and Southwest Parke Community School Corporation.

Former school districts include Rockville Community Schools and Turkey Run Community School Corporation.

== See also ==
- National Register of Historic Places listings in Parke County, Indiana
- Parke County Covered Bridge Festival
- Parke County Covered Bridges
