= Coxville, Indiana =

Unincorporated community in Indiana, United States

- Unincorporated community
- Parke County's location in Indiana

- Location in Parke County
- Coordinates: 39°39′07″N 87°17′40″W
- Country: United States
- State: Indiana
- County: Parke
- Township: Florida
- Elevation: 518 ft (158 m)
- Time zone: UTC-5 (Eastern (EST))
  - Summer (DST): UTC-4 (EDT)
- ZIP code: 47874
- Area code: 765
- GNIS feature ID: 433073

Coxville, also known as Roseville, is an unincorporated community in Florida Township, Parke County, in the U.S. state of Indiana.

== History ==
Coxville was named in honor of William Cox, the operator of a nearby mill.
