= National Register of Historic Places listings in Union County, Indiana =

Location of Union County in Indiana

This is a list of the National Register of Historic Places listings in Union County, Indiana.

This is intended to be a complete list of the properties and districts on National Register of Historic Places in Union County, Indiana, United States. Latitude and longitude coordinates are provided for many National Register properties and districts; these locations may be seen together in a map.

There are three properties and districts listed on the National Register in the county. Another two properties were once listed but have been removed. Properties and districts located in incorporated areas display the name of the municipality, while properties and districts in unincorporated areas display the name of their civil township. Properties and districts split between multiple jurisdictions display the names of all jurisdictions.

This National Park Service list is complete through NPS recent listings posted August 22, 2025.

== Current listings ==
	Name on the Register	Image	Date listed	Location	City or town	Description
1	Liberty Courthouse Square Historic District	Liberty Courthouse Square Historic District	December 31, 2013 (#13001018)	Courthouse Square and adjacent blocks along Union and Market Sts. 39°38′08″N 84°55′48″W	Liberty	
2	Liberty Residential Historic District	Liberty Residential Historic District	December 31, 2013 (#13001017)	28 and 103-403 E. Union, 4-8 W. Seminary, 2-124 E. Seminary, and 1-7 S. Fairground Sts., and 2 and 102 College Corner Ave. 39°38′08″N 84°55′39″W	Liberty	
3	Union County Courthouse	Union County Courthouse	July 21, 1987 (#87000103)	Courthouse Sq. 39°38′05″N 84°55′50″W	Liberty	

== Former listings ==
	Name on the Register	Image	Date listed	Date removed	Location	City or town	Description
1	Brownsville Covered Bridge	Brownsville Covered Bridge	October 15, 1973 (#73002283)	October 16, 1974	Off State Road 14	Brownsville	Disassembled in 1974. Initially was to be relocated to Eagle Creek Park in Indianapolis, it was instead used to replace the Clifty Bridge in Mill Race Park in Columbus in 1985
2	Dr. John Grove House and Office		February 11, 1982 (#82000081)	July 19, 1985	23-27 S. Market St	Liberty	

== See also ==
- List of National Historic Landmarks in Indiana
- National Register of Historic Places listings in Indiana
- Listings in neighboring counties: Butler (OH), Fayette, Franklin, Preble (OH), Wayne
- List of Indiana state historical markers in Union County
