= List of bridges documented by the Historic American Engineering Record in Indiana =

This is a list of bridges documented by the Historic American Engineering Record in the US state of Indiana.

== Bridges ==
Survey No.	Name (as assigned by HAER)	Status	Type	Built	Documented	Carries	Crosses	Location	County	Coordinates
IN-16	Laughery Creek Bridge	Bypassed	Whipple truss	1878	1974	SR 56 (former)	Laughery Creek	Aurora	Dearborn and Ohio	39°01′29″N 84°53′09″W
IN-19	Madison and Indianapolis Railroad, Madison Incline	Replaced	Reinforced concrete closed-spandrel arch		1974	SR 56 (West Main Street)	Madison and Indianapolis Railroad	Madison	Jefferson	38°44′22″N 85°23′46″W
IN-20	Madison and Indianapolis Railroad, Vernon Overpass	Extant	Stone arch		1974	Madison and Indianapolis Railroad	North Pike Street	Vernon	Jennings	38°59′11″N 85°36′33″W
IN-21	Feederdam Bridge	Extant	Whipple truss	1894	1974	Towpath Road	Eel River	Clay City	Clay	39°20′09″N 87°06′49″W
IN-22	Wabash River Bridge	Bypassed	Whipple truss	1887	1974	SR 316 (former)	Wabash River	Vera Cruz	Wells	40°41′55″N 85°04′59″W
IN-23	Mill Creek Bridge	Extant	Pratt truss	1885	1981	CR 253 (South Alton Road)	Mill Creek	Alton	Crawford	38°07′49″N 86°25′07″W
IN-24	Gospel Street Bridge	Extant	Pratt truss	1880	1981	South Gospel Street	Mill Creek	Paoli	Orange	38°33′16″N 86°28′06″W
IN-25	Tippecanoe River Bridge	Replaced	Baltimore truss	1890	1981	CR 350 E	Tippecanoe River	Rochester	Fulton	41°07′20″N 86°10′40″W
IN-27	Brownsville Covered Bridge	Relocated	Long truss	1840	1974	West Old Brownsville Road	East Fork of Whitewater River	Brownsville	Union	39°39′54″N 85°00′24″W
IN-28	Deer's Mill Covered Bridge	Bypassed	Burr truss	1878	1974	SR 234 (former)	Sugar Creek	Deer's Mill	Montgomery	39°56′46″N 87°03′33″W
IN-29	Adams Mill Bridge	Extant	Howe truss	1872	1974	CR 50 E	Wildcat Creek	Cutler	Carroll	40°29′01″N 86°30′42″W
IN-30	Vermont Covered Bridge	Relocated	Smith truss	1875	1971	Highland Park trail	Kokomo Creek	Kokomo	Howard	40°28′10″N 86°08′32″W
IN-31	Dunlapsville Covered Bridge	Replaced	Burr truss	1870	1971	West Dunlapsville Road	East Fork of Whitewater River	Dunlapsville	Union	39°35′15″N 84°59′10″W
IN-33	Busching Covered Bridge	Relocated	Howe truss	1885	1973	CR 25 S (Covered Bridge Road)	Laughery Creek	Versailles	Ripley	39°04′04″N 85°14′16″W
IN-39	Gosport Covered Bridge	Destroyed	Smith truss	1870	1972	East South Street	East Fork of White River	Gosport	Owen	39°20′55″N 86°39′32″W
IN-40	Leatherwood Station Covered Bridge	Relocated	Burr truss	1899	1979	Trail	Williams Creek	Billie Creek Village	Adams	39°45′28″N 87°12′33″W
IN-44	Mansfield Covered Bridge	Extant	Burr truss	1867	1982	CR 145 (Martin Road)	Big Raccoon Creek	Mansfield	Parke	39°40′32″N 87°06′06″W
IN-45	Medora Bridge	Bypassed	Burr truss	1875	1982	SR 235 (former)	East Fork of White River	Medora	Jackson	38°49′07″N 86°08′50″W
IN-46	Bells Ford Bridge	Destroyed	Post truss	1858	1971	SR 258 (former)	East Fork of White River	Seymour	Jackson	38°58′25″N 85°55′47″W
IN-47	Delaware County Bridge No. 131	Bypassed	Parker truss	1897	1982	CR 750 W (former)	White River	Yorktown	Delaware	40°09′58″N 85°31′48″W
IN-48	Jackson Covered Bridge	Extant	Burr truss	1861		CR 25 (Bloomingdale Road)	Sugar Creek	Bloomingdale	Parke	39°52′48″N 87°16′57″W
IN-49	Narrows Bridge	Bypassed	Burr truss	1882		CR 280 E (Narrows Road) (former)	Sugar Creek	Marshall	Parke	39°53′28″N 87°11′08″W
IN-50	Cumberland Covered Bridge	Extant	Howe truss	1882		CR 1000 E	Mississinewa River	Matthews	Grant	40°23′19″N 85°29′05″W
IN-52	Hamilton County Bridge No. 218	Replaced	Baltimore truss	1928	1982	Greenfield Pike	Stony Creek	Noblesville	Hamilton	40°01′44″N 86°00′11″W
IN-57	Ceylon Covered Bridge	Bypassed	Smith truss	1879		CR 900 S (former)	Wabash River	Geneva	Adams	40°36′51″N 84°56′35″W
IN-58	River Vale Bridge	Replaced	Pennsylvania truss	1913	1993	CR 27 (Lawrenceport Road)	East Fork of White River	Bedford	Lawrence	38°46′12″N 86°24′34″W
IN-59	Hutsonville Bridge	Replaced	Suspension	1939	1988	SR 154	Wabash River	Graysville, Indiana, and Hutsonville, Illinois	Sullivan County, Indiana, and Crawford County, Illinois	39°06′36″N 87°39′18″W
IN-60	Attica Bridge	Replaced	Parker truss	1904	1989	CR 500 E	Deer Creek	Young America	Cass	40°35′47″N 86°16′47″W
IN-61	Wabash River Bridge	Replaced	Whipple truss	1885	1987	CR 200 W (Salamonie Road)	Wabash River	Huntington	Huntington	40°51′12″N 85°29′23″W
IN-64	Wabash River Bridge	Replaced	Pratt truss	1905	1989	US 40	Wabash River	Terre Haute	Vigo	39°27′59″N 87°25′13″W
IN-67	Riverside–Independence Bridge	Replaced	Warren truss	1904		CR 500 E	Wabash River	Riverside	Fountain	40°20′06″N 87°10′04″W
IN-68	County Line Bridge	Extant	Reinforced concrete open-spandrel arch	1930	1993	SR 219	St. Joseph River	Osceola	St. Joseph	41°40′48″N 86°03′41″W
IN-69	Cicott Street Bridge	Replaced	Reinforced concrete closed-spandrel arch	1913	1991	SR 25	Wabash River	Logansport	Cass	40°44′51″N 86°22′38″W
IN-70	Carroll County Bridge No. 119	Replaced	Whipple truss	1888	1991	CR 300 W	Deer Creek	Camden	Carroll	40°36′00″N 86°34′57″W
IN-73	Freedom Bridge	Replaced	Pennsylvania truss	1882	1992	CR 590 S	West Fork of White River	Freedom	Owen	39°12′20″N 86°51′57″W
IN-77	David H. Remley Road Bridge	Replaced	Pratt truss	1913	1992	CR 225 W	Sugar Creek	Crawfordsville	Montgomery	40°02′28″N 86°56′47″W
IN-78	Kidner Bridge	Replaced	Warren truss	1899	1992	CR 700 S	Mississinewa River	Upland	Grant	40°27′08″N 85°31′36″W
IN-79	Creviston Bridge	Replaced	Warren truss	1915	1994	CR 1100 S	Big Pipe Creek	Converse	Miami	40°36′32″N 85°52′57″W
IN-81	Warrick County Bridge No. 266	Replaced	Pratt truss	1904	1994	CR 550 W (Vanada Road)	Cypress Creek	Newburgh	Warrick	37°56′36″N 87°21′00″W
IN-83	Vigo County Bridge No. 139	Replaced	Reinforced concrete closed-spandrel arch	1911	1994	74th Place	Sugar Creek	Terre Haute	Vigo	39°29′02″N 87°31′54″W
IN-84	Wells Street Bridge	Replaced	Reinforced concrete closed-spandrel arch	1914	1994	Wells Street	Spy Run Creek	Fort Wayne	Allen	41°06′08″N 85°08′50″W
IN-85	Wayne County Bridge No. 122	Replaced	Whipple truss	1881	1994	Main Street	West Fork of Whitewater River	Milton	Wayne	39°47′13″N 85°09′06″W
IN-86	Armantrout Bridge	Replaced	Pratt truss	1897	1995	CR 130 W	Kilmore Creek	Frankfort	Clinton	40°20′12″N 86°31′55″W
IN-87	Wabash County Bridge No. 509	Replaced	Pratt truss	1889	1995	Smith Street	Wabash River	Wabash	Wabash	40°47′26″N 85°49′41″W
IN-88	Vandalia Railroad Bridge	Replaced	Reinforced concrete closed-spandrel arch	1917	1995	Vandalia Railroad	US 40	Indianapolis	Marion	39°44′19″N 86°17′49″W
IN-89	Main Street Bridge	Replaced	Reinforced concrete open-spandrel arch	1920	1995	Main Street	East Fork of Whitewater River	Richmond	Wayne	39°49′45″N 84°54′07″W
IN-90	Madison County Bridge No. 90	Replaced	Warren truss	1930	1996	CR 600 N	Killbuck Creek	Moonville	Madison	40°11′38″N 85°39′14″W
IN-91	Delphi Bridge	Replaced	Reinforced concrete closed-spandrel arch	1935	1995	US 421	Deer Creek	Delphi	Carroll	40°35′02″N 86°40′21″W
IN-92	Seventh Street Bridge	Replaced	Reinforced concrete closed-spandrel arch	1913	1996	Seventh Street	Haw Creek	Columbus	Bartholomew	39°12′22″N 85°54′14″W
IN-93	Meridian Street Bridge	Extant	Reinforced concrete through arch	1914	1996	US 27 (Meridian Street)	Salamonie River	Portland	Jay	40°25′51″N 84°58′40″W
IN-94	Wells County Bridge No. 74	Replaced	Pratt truss	1903	1997	CR 400 W	Rock Creek Ditch	Bluffton	Wells	40°43′56″N 85°17′54″W
IN-95	Pendleton Avenue Bridge	Replaced	Steel rolled multi-beam	1915	1997	Pendleton Avenue	Fall Creek	Pendleton	Madison	40°00′20″N 85°44′44″W
IN-96	Vermillion County Bridge No. 120	Replaced	Reinforced concrete closed-spandrel arch	1913	1997	Main Street	Little Vermilion River	Newport	Vermillion	39°53′12″N 87°24′32″W
IN-97	Cement Plant Road Bridge	Extant	Reinforced concrete girder	1909	1997	CR 50 S (Cement Plant Road)	Leatherwood Creek	Bedford	Lawrence	38°51′18″N 86°28′10″W
IN-98	Dubois County Bridge No. 3002	Replaced	Reinforced concrete T-beam	1940	1996	SR 64	Hunley Creek	Huntingburg	Dubois	38°17′57″N 86°54′55″W
IN-99	Patrick Ford Bridge	Replaced	Reinforced concrete closed-spandrel arch	1907	1997	CR 315 N	Little Vermilion River	Humrick	Vermillion	39°55′34″N 87°31′33″W
IN-100	Putnam County Bridge No. 111	Replaced	Reinforced concrete closed-spandrel arch	1909	1998	CR 50 N	Little Walnut Creek	Greencastle	Putnam	39°40′08″N 86°56′33″W
IN-102	Lamb's Creek Bridge	Bypassed	Pratt truss	1893	2000	SR 67 (former)	Lamb's Creek	Martinsville	Morgan	39°25′26″N 86°28′31″W
IN-103	Pine Bluff Bridge	Extant	Howe truss	1886	2002	CR 950 N	Big Walnut Creek	Bainbridge	Putnam	39°47′36″N 86°46′25″W
IN-104	Cataract Falls Bridge	Bypassed	Smith truss	1876	2002	CR 279 (North Cataract Road) (former)	Mill Creek	Cataract	Owen	39°26′00″N 86°48′47″W
IN-105	West Union Bridge	Bypassed	Burr truss	1876	2002	CR 525 W (Tow Path Road) (former)	Sugar Creek	Reserve Township	Parke	39°51′18″N 87°20′09″W
IN-106	Forsythe Bridge	Extant	Burr truss	1888	2002	CR 650 S	Big Flat Rock River	Orange Township	Rush	39°31′02″N 85°31′50″W
IN-108	Duck Creek Aqueduct	Extant	Burr truss	1848	2005	Whitewater Canal	Duck Creek	Metamora	Franklin	39°26′46″N 85°07′48″W
IN-113	Branson Street Bridge	Extant	Reinforced concrete cast-in-place slab	1954	2014	Branson Street	Mississinewa River	Marion	Grant	40°33′40″N 85°39′25″W
KY-10	Big Four Bridge	Extant	Pennsylvania truss	1929	1984	Cleveland, Cincinnati, Chicago and St. Louis Railway (former)	Ohio River	Jeffersonville, Indiana, and Louisville, Kentucky	Clark County, Indiana, and Jefferson County, Kentucky	38°15′56″N 85°44′20″W
KY-53	US 421 Milton–Madison Bridge	Replaced	Cantilever	1929	2010	US 421	Ohio River	Madison, Indiana, and Milton, Kentucky	Jefferson County, Indiana, and Trimble County, Kentucky	38°43′45″N 85°22′12″W

== See also ==
- List of covered bridges in Indiana
