= Liberty Township, Union County, Indiana =

Liberty Township
- Township
- Location in Union County
- Coordinates: 39°37′07″N 84°59′42″W
- Country: United States
- State: Indiana
- County: Union

Government
  - Type: Indiana township

Area
  - Total: 25 sq mi (65 km^{2})
  - Land: 23.72 sq mi (61.4 km^{2})
  - Water: 1.28 sq mi (3.3 km^{2}) 5.12%
- Elevation: 748 ft (228 m)

Population (2020)
  - Total: 1,025
  - Density: 43.21/sq mi (16.68/km^{2})
- Time zone: UTC-5 (Eastern (EST))
  - Summer (DST): UTC-4 (EDT)
- ZIP codes: 47325, 47353
- Area code: 765
- GNIS feature ID: 453563

Liberty Township is one of six townships in Union County, Indiana, United States. As of the 2020 census, its population was 1,025 and it contained 451 housing units.

Historical population
Census	Pop.	Note	%±
1890	797		—
1900	691		−13.3%
1910	594		−14.0%
1920	549		−7.6%
1930	541		−1.5%
1940	560		3.5%
1950	520		−7.1%
1960	551		6.0%
1970	712		29.2%
1980	873		22.6%
1990	910		4.2%
2000	1,032		13.4%
2010	1,025		−0.7%
Source: US Decennial Census

== Geography ==
According to the 2010 census, the township has a total area of 25 square miles (65 km^{2}), of which 23.72 square miles (61.4 km^{2}) (or 94.88%) is land and 1.28 square miles (3.3 km^{2}) (or 5.12%) is water.

=== Unincorporated towns ===
- Dunlapsville at 39.5908823°N 84.9935723°W
- Roseburg at 39.5889385°N 84.9469043°W

(This list is based on USGS data and may include former settlements.)

=== Adjacent townships ===
- Brownsville Township (north)
- Center Township (east)
- Union Township (southeast)
- Harmony Township (south)
- Jennings Township, Fayette County (west)
- Waterloo Township, Fayette County (northwest)

=== Cemeteries ===
The township contains these two cemeteries: Patterson and Silver Creek.

=== Lakes ===
- Whitewater Lake

=== Landmarks ===
- Whitewater Memorial State Park (vast majority)

== School districts ==
- Union County–College Corner Joint School District

== Political districts ==
- Indiana's 6th congressional district
- State House District 55
- State Senate District 43
