= List of Indiana state historical markers in Union County =

Location of Union County in Indiana

This is a list of the Indiana state historical markers in Union County.

This is intended to be a detailed table of the official state historical marker placed in Union County, Indiana, United States by the Indiana Historical Bureau. The location of the historical marker and its latitude and longitude coordinates are included below when available, along with its name, year of placement, and topics as recorded by the Historical Bureau. There are 2 historical markers located in Union County.

== Historical markers ==
Marker title	Image	Year placed	Location	Topics
Maj. Gen. Ambrose E. Burnside 1824-1881		1963	Northwestern portion of the courthouse lawn, at the junction of Main and Union Streets, in Liberty; 39°38′7″N 84°55′50″W	Science, Medicine, and Inventions, Military
Wanted by FBI / Captured by G-Men		2017	Stateline Ball Park / Town Grove, near 305 Church St. in West College Corner; 39°33′59.3″N 84°49′7.5″W	

== See also ==
- List of Indiana state historical markers
- National Register of Historic Places listings in Union County, Indiana
