= Brownsville Township, Union County, Indiana =

Brownsville Township
- Township
- Location in Union County
- Coordinates: 39°41′34″N 84°58′50″W
- Country: United States
- State: Indiana
- County: Union

Government
  - Type: Indiana township

Area
  - Total: 28.54 sq mi (73.9 km^{2})
  - Land: 28.39 sq mi (73.5 km^{2})
  - Water: 0.15 sq mi (0.39 km^{2}) 0.53%
- Elevation: 791 ft (241 m)

Population (2020)
  - Total: 744
  - Density: 26.2/sq mi (10.1/km^{2})
- Time zone: UTC-5 (Eastern (EST))
  - Summer (DST): UTC-4 (EDT)
- ZIP codes: 47325, 47353
- Area code: 765
- GNIS feature ID: 453144

Brownsville Township is one of six townships in Union County, Indiana, United States. As of the 2020 census, its population was 744 and it contained 332 housing units.

Historical population
Census	Pop.	Note	%±
1890	992		—
1900	967		−2.5%
1910	844		−12.7%
1920	736		−12.8%
1930	772		4.9%
1940	831		7.6%
1950	857		3.1%
1960	862		0.6%
1970	909		5.5%
1980	921		1.3%
1990	850		−7.7%
2000	857		0.8%
2010	845		−1.4%
2020	744		−12.0%
Source: US Decennial Census

== Geography ==
According to the 2010 census, the township has a total area of 28.54 square miles (73.9 km^{2}), of which 28.39 square miles (73.5 km^{2}) (or 99.47%) is land and 0.15 square miles (0.39 km^{2}) (or 0.53%) is water.

=== Unincorporated towns ===
- Brownsville at 39.6644924°N 85.0046842°W
- Clifton at 39.6903261°N 84.9557944°W
- Philomath at 39.7239361°N 85.0157959°W

(This list is based on USGS data and may include former settlements.)

=== Adjacent townships ===
- Abington Township, Wayne County (north)
- Boston Township, Wayne County (northeast)
- Harrison Township (east)
- Center Township (southeast)
- Liberty Township (south)
- Jennings Township, Fayette County (southwest)
- Waterloo Township, Fayette County (west)

=== Cemeteries ===
The township contains these two cemeteries: Richland and Woods Chapel.

== School districts ==
- Union County–College Corner Joint School District

== Political districts ==
- Indiana's 6th congressional district
- State House District 55
- State Senate District 43
