= Howe Tavern =

Howe Tavern may refer to:

- Howe's Tavern, the original name of Wayside Inn in the Wayside Inn Historic District in Sudbury, Massachusetts
- Howe Tavern (College Corner, Ohio), a historic former hotel in the Butler County portion of College Corner, Ohio, in use as a hotel into the 1970s
