= Harmony Township, Union County, Indiana =

Harmony Township
- Township
- Location in Union County
- Coordinates: 39°33′17″N 84°59′07″W
- Country: United States
- State: Indiana
- County: Union

Government
  - Type: Indiana township

Area
  - Total: 22.99 sq mi (59.5 km^{2})
  - Land: 20.65 sq mi (53.5 km^{2})
  - Water: 2.34 sq mi (6.1 km^{2}) 10.18%
- Elevation: 807 ft (246 m)

Population (2020)
  - Total: 527
  - Density: 25.5/sq mi (9.85/km^{2})
- Time zone: UTC-5 (Eastern (EST))
  - Summer (DST): UTC-4 (EDT)
- ZIP codes: 47331, 47353
- Area code: 765
- GNIS feature ID: 453375

Harmony Township is one of six townships in Union County, Indiana, United States. As of the 2020 census, its population was 527 and it contained 286 housing units.

Historical population
Census	Pop.	Note	%±
1890	611		—
1900	595		−2.6%
1910	549		−7.7%
1920	524		−4.6%
1930	429		−18.1%
1940	432		0.7%
1950	443		2.5%
1960	442		−0.2%
1970	335		−24.2%
1980	377		12.5%
1990	419		11.1%
2000	628		49.9%
2010	543		−13.5%
2020	527		−2.9%
Source: US Decennial Census

== Geography ==
According to the 2010 census, the township has a total area of 22.99 square miles (59.5 km^{2}), of which 20.65 square miles (53.5 km^{2}) (or 89.82%) is land and 2.34 square miles (6.1 km^{2}) (or 10.18%) is water.

=== Unincorporated towns ===
- Quakertown at 39.5800490°N 85.0016280°W

(This list is based on USGS data and may include former settlements.)

=== Adjacent townships ===
- Liberty Township (north)
- Union Township (east)
- Bath Township, Franklin County (southeast)
- Fairfield Township, Franklin County (south)
- Blooming Grove Township, Franklin County (southwest)
- Jackson Township, Fayette County (west)
- Jennings Township, Fayette County (northwest)

=== Cemeteries ===
The township contains these two cemeteries: New Hope and Old Bath Springs.

== School districts ==
- Union County–College Corner Joint School District

== Political districts ==
- Indiana's 6th congressional district
- State House District 55
- State Senate District 43
