= Howe Tavern (College Corner, Ohio) =

- U.S. National Register of Historic Places
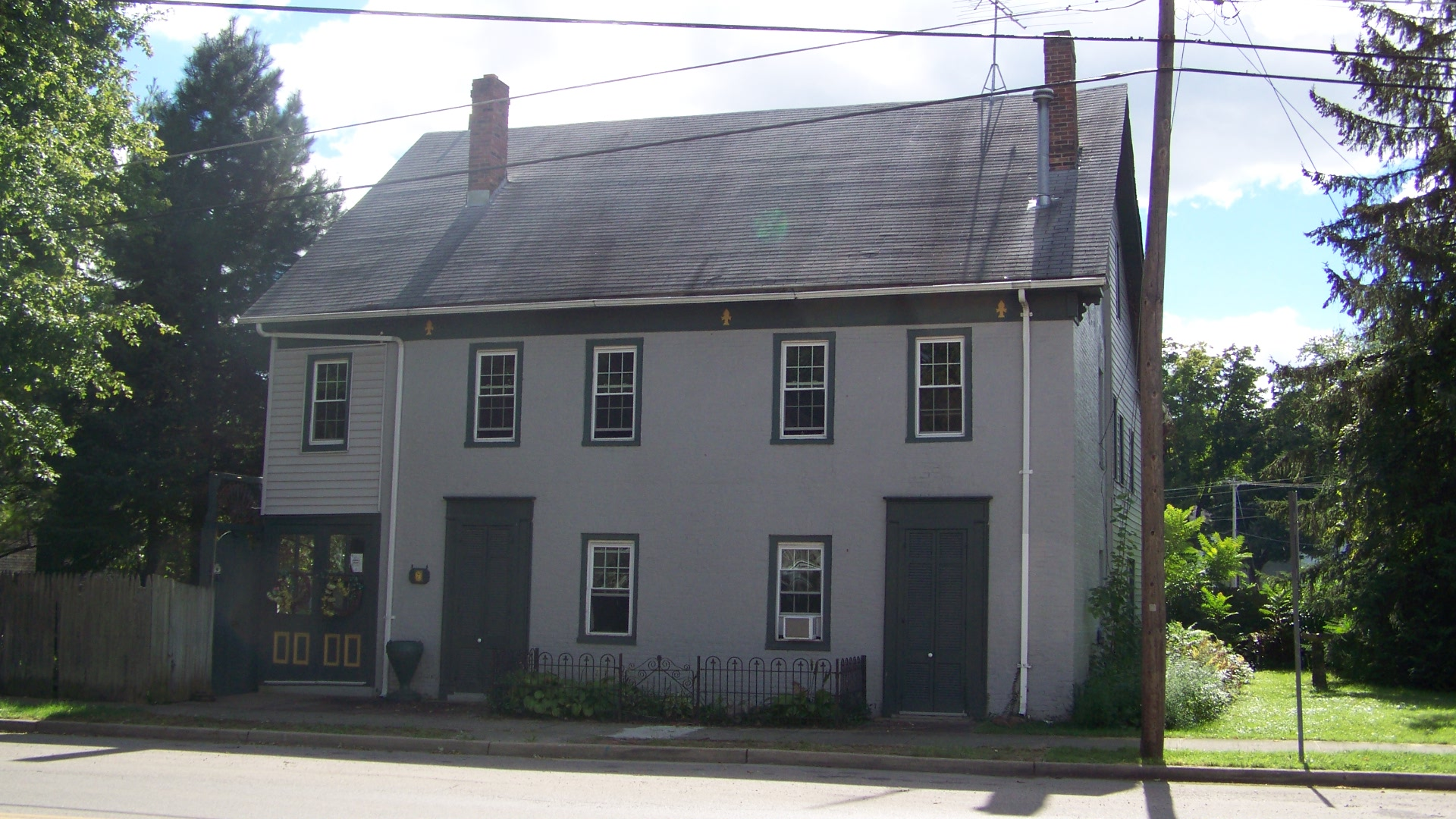

- Location within Ohio Location within the United States
- Location: U.S. Route 27, College Corner, Ohio
- Coordinates: 39°34′2.5″N 84°48′54″W
- Area: Less than 1 acre (0.40 ha)
- Built: 1832
- Architect: Gideon S. Howe
- NRHP reference No.: 76001376
- Added to NRHP: January 30, 1976

The Howe Tavern is a historic former hotel in the Butler County portion of College Corner, Ohio, United States. Constructed before the village was founded, it remained a hotel into the late 20th century, and it has been named a historic site.

In 1832, Gideon Sears Howe bought the site of College Corner from Miami University in nearby Oxford; the site was significant for its spot on the road (now U.S. Route 27) connecting Hamilton, Ohio with Richmond, Indiana. Here he arranged for the erection of a tavern, which opened in the following year. Other settlers began coming before long, and in 1837 Howe platted a town around the tavern, naming it "College Corner". The area's earliest buildings were built in 1811, and a post office was established in the Preble County portion of the community in 1830, but the Howe Tavern was the community's earliest example of permanent construction. It remained in its original use into the 1970s.

Built of brick, the tavern rests on a foundation of stone and is covered with a gabled roof. The facade is divided into three bays: on the second floor, the right and middle bays are pierced by two windows, while the left bay is only wide enough for one window. From right to left, the five windows sit above a door, a window, a window, a door, and a porch-like window. The original building is two-and-a-half stories tall, built as a rectangle, although a later two-story addition on the northwestern corner causes the whole building to resemble the shape of the letter "L".

In 1976, the tavern was listed on the National Register of Historic Places, qualifying both because of its place in local history and because of its historically significant architecture, because of its place as the core of the original community and because it remained a fine example of inns from the early nineteenth century, respectively. No other locations in College Corner, nor any in West College Corner in Indiana just a few feet west, are listed on the National Register.
