= Billingsville =

Billingsville may refer to:

- Billingsville, Indiana, an unincorporated community in Union County
- Billingsville, Missouri, an unincorporated community
- Billingsville School, a historic building in North Carolina
