= Harmony Township, Indiana =

Harmony Township is the name of two townships in the U.S. state of Indiana:

- Harmony Township, Posey County, Indiana
- Harmony Township, Union County, Indiana
