= Walter F. Bossert =

Walter Frederick Bossert (27 April 1885 – 14 January 1946) was Grand Dragon of the Ku Klux Klan for Indiana and 17 other states, from 1924 to 1926.

== Biography ==
Bossert was born and attended school in Brookville, Indiana, then obtained his law degree at Indiana University Bloomington in 1907. After several years as a prosecutor and private practice lawyer in Brookville and Terre Haute, Indiana, he settled in Liberty, Indiana. There he established a private practice, and later served as attorney for both Liberty and Union County, Indiana. With his attorney brother Elmer F. Bossert, he was the senior partner in the firm Bossert and Bossert. From 1922 to 1926 he also maintained a law office in Indianapolis, Indiana. The law firm that he founded in Liberty became Toney & Douglass until it closed in 2017.

In 1913 he wed Healen Margaret Roach and they remained married until his death.

Bossert was chairman of the Union County Republican Committee from 1910 to 1914, and was Sixth District chairman from 1916 to 1922. He served on the Republican state committee. Bossert assisted national Republican Party chairman Will H. Hays and often traveled with Hayes around the U.S.

When Ku Klux Klan powerbroker D. C. Stephenson was ousted from his position as Grand Dragon after committing murder, Bossert replaced him. After Stephenson was convicted in 1925 of murder resulting from his violent rape of a female associate, the Klan quickly lost favor with the public and its considerable political clout in Indiana declined. After resigning as Grand Dragon in 1926, Bossert devoted himself to his legal practice and Republican Party politics. He made unsuccessful attempts to secure the Republican nomination for United States senator in 1938 and 1940. In 1943 he was named board chairman of the Indiana Old Age Pension Fund.

Bossert died at his Liberty home, and he was buried at West Point Cemetery on the outskirts of the town.
