= Roseburg, Indiana =

Roseburg is the name of two places in the State of Indiana in the United States of America:

- Roseburg, Grant County, Indiana
- Roseburg, Union County, Indiana
