= Harrison Township, Union County, Indiana =

Harrison Township
- Township
- Location in Union County
- Coordinates: 39°41′16″N 84°51′58″W
- Country: United States
- State: Indiana
- County: Union

Government
  - Type: Indiana township

Area
  - Total: 30.13 sq mi (78.0 km^{2})
  - Land: 30.11 sq mi (78.0 km^{2})
  - Water: 0.02 sq mi (0.052 km^{2}) 0.07%
- Elevation: 1,109 ft (338 m)

Population (2020)
  - Total: 429
  - Density: 14.2/sq mi (5.50/km^{2})
- Time zone: UTC-5 (Eastern (EST))
  - Summer (DST): UTC-4 (EDT)
- ZIP codes: 47353, 47374
- Area code: 765
- GNIS feature ID: 453397

Harrison Township is one of six townships in Union County, Indiana, United States. As of the 2020 census, its population was 429 and it contained 176 housing units.

Historical population
Census	Pop.	Note	%±
1890	741		—
1900	684		−7.7%
1910	652		−4.7%
1920	673		3.2%
1930	723		7.4%
1940	638		−11.8%
1950	600		−6.0%
1960	531		−11.5%
1970	554		4.3%
1980	538		−2.9%
1990	481		−10.6%
2000	406		−15.6%
2010	416		2.5%
2020	429		3.1%
Source: US Decennial Census

== Geography ==
According to the 2010 census, the township has a total area of 30.13 square miles (78.0 km^{2}), of which 30.11 square miles (78.0 km^{2}) (or 99.93%) is land and 0.02 square miles (0.052 km^{2}) (or 0.07%) is water.

=== Unincorporated towns ===
- Kitchel at 39.6831051°N 84.8613475°W

(This list is based on USGS data and may include former settlements.)

=== Cemeteries ===
The township contains these two cemeteries: Nutter and Railsback.

== School districts ==
- Union County–College Corner Joint School District

== Political districts ==
- Indiana's 6th congressional district
- State House District 55
- State Senate District 43
