= Dr. John Grove House and Office =

Historic house in Indiana, United States

- Formerly listed on the U.S. National Register of Historic Places
- Location: 23-27 S. Market St, Liberty, Indiana
- Area: less than one acre
- Built: 1885
- Architectural style: Gothic, Italianate
- NRHP reference No.: 82000081

Significant dates
- Added to NRHP: February 11, 1982
- Removed from NRHP: July 19, 1985

Dr. John Grove House and Office was a historic home and office located at Liberty, Indiana. It was built in 1885, and consisted of a two-story, rectangular store front section with an attached two-story residence of frame construction sheathed in clapboard. The complex was in the Italianate / Gothic Revival style.

It was listed on the National Register of Historic Places in 1982 and delisted in 1985.
