= Kitchel, Indiana =

- Unincorporated community
- Location within Indiana Location within the United States
- Coordinates: 39°40′59″N 84°51′41″W
- Country: United States
- State: Indiana
- County: Union
- Township: Harrison
- Elevation: 1,106 ft (337 m)
- Time zone: UTC-5 (Eastern (EST))
  - Summer (DST): UTC-4 (EDT)
- ZIP code: 47353
- Area code: 765
- GNIS feature ID: 437365

Kitchel is an unincorporated community in Harrison Township, Union County, in the U.S. state of Indiana.

== History ==
A post office was established at Kitchel in 1901, and remained in operation until it was discontinued in 1951.

Harrison Township School, built in 1923, is located in Kitchel. It has been closed for years.
