= Lamb's Creek Bridge =

- U.S. National Register of Historic Places
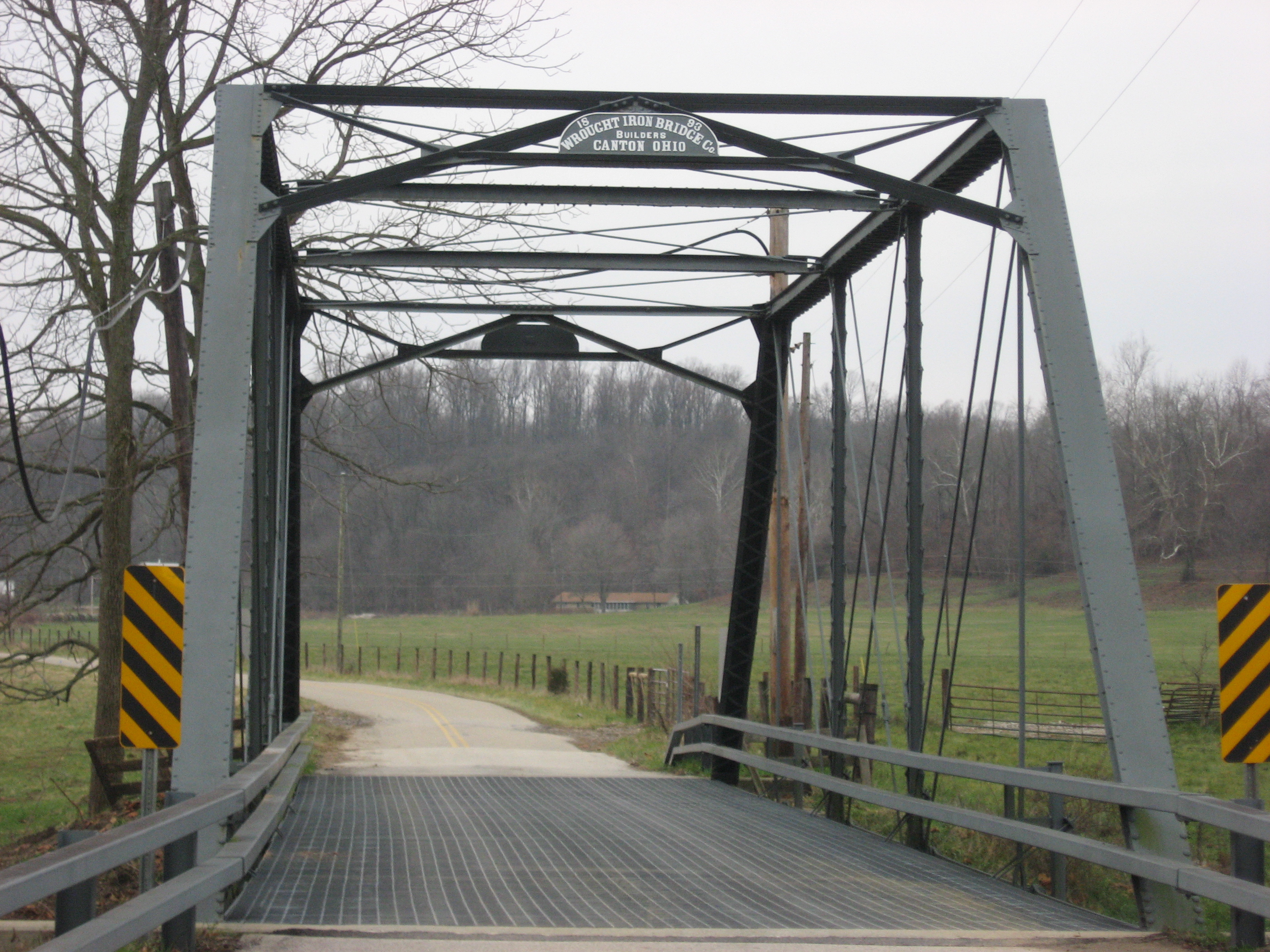
- Lamb's Creek Bridge, December 2011

- Location within Indiana Location within the United States
- Location: Junction of Lamb's Creek and W. Old State Road 67, west of Martinsville in Jefferson Township, Morgan County, Indiana
- Coordinates: 39°25′26″N 86°28′31″W
- Area: less than one acre
- Built: 1893
- Built by: Wrought Iron Bridge Co.
- Architectural style: Pratt Through Truss
- NRHP reference No.: 00001541
- Added to NRHP: December 28, 2000

Lamb's Creek Bridge, also known as Morgan County Bridge No. 146 and Burnett's Creek Bridge, is a historic Pratt through truss bridge located in Jefferson Township, Morgan County, Indiana. It was built in 1893 by the Wrought Iron Bridge Company. It is 85 feet (26 m) long and 16 feet (4.9 m) wide. It is supported by cast-in-place concrete abutments.

The bridge was listed on the National Register of Historic Places in 2001.

== See also ==
- List of bridges documented by the Historic American Engineering Record in Indiana
