= Philomath, Indiana =

- Unincorporated community
- Location within Indiana Location within the United States
- Coordinates: 39°43′26″N 85°00′57″W
- Country: United States
- State: Indiana
- County: Union
- Township: Brownsville
- Elevation: 1,076 ft (328 m)
- Time zone: UTC-5 (Eastern (EST))
  - Summer (DST): UTC-4 (EDT)
- ZIP code: 47325
- Area code: 765
- GNIS feature ID: 441093

Philomath is an unincorporated community in Brownsville Township, Union County, in the U.S. state of Indiana.

== History ==
A post office was established at Philomath in 1837, and remained in operation until it was discontinued in 1907.
