= Clifton, Indiana =

- Unincorporated community
- Location within Indiana Location within the United States
- Coordinates: 39°41′25″N 84°57′21″W
- Country: United States
- State: Indiana
- County: Union
- Township: Brownsville
- Elevation: 1,014 ft (309 m)
- Time zone: UTC-5 (Eastern (EST))
  - Summer (DST): UTC-4 (EDT)
- ZIP code: 47353
- Area code: 765
- GNIS feature ID: 432653

Clifton is an unincorporated community in Brownsville Township, Union County, in the U.S. state of Indiana.

== History ==
A post office was established at Clifton in 1852, and remained in operation until it was discontinued in 1951.
