= Cottage Grove, Indiana =

- Unincorporated community
- Location within Indiana Location within the United States
- Coordinates: 39°35′47″N 84°51′42″W
- Country: United States
- State: Indiana
- County: Union
- Township: Center
- Elevation: 1,043 ft (318 m)
- Time zone: UTC-5 (Eastern (EST))
  - Summer (DST): UTC-4 (EDT)
- ZIP code: 47353
- Area code: 765
- GNIS feature ID: 433011

Cottage Grove is a town in Center Township, Union County, in the U.S. state of Indiana.

== History ==
Cottage Grove was first settled in 1859 and was named because it consisted of a group of cottages.

A post office was established at Cottage Grove in September 1837, and remained in operation until it was discontinued in 1951.
