= Goodwins Corner, Indiana =

- Unincorporated community
- Location within Indiana Location within the United States
- Coordinates: 39°38′57″N 84°50′01″W
- Country: United States
- State: Indiana
- County: Union
- Township: Center
- Elevation: 1,063 ft (324 m)
- Time zone: UTC-5 (Eastern (EST))
  - Summer (DST): UTC-4 (EDT)
- ZIP code: 47353
- Area code: 765
- GNIS feature ID: 435177

Goodwins Corner is an unincorporated community in Center Township, Union County, in the U.S. state of Indiana

== History ==
A post office was established at Goodwins Corner in 1871, and remained in operation until 1903. The community was named after the Goodwin family of settlers.
