= Brownsville Covered Bridge =

- Formerly listed on the U.S. National Register of Historic Places
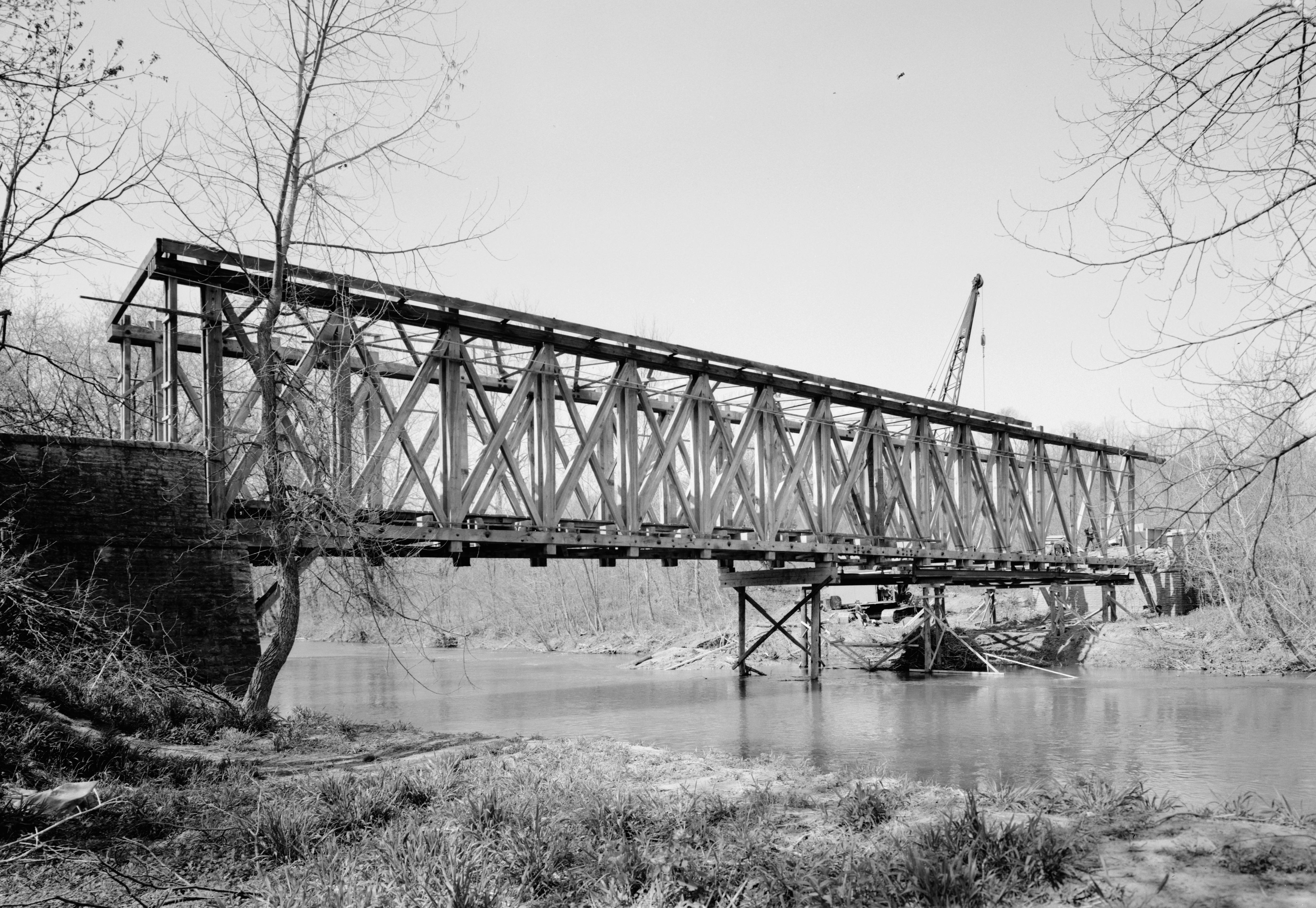
- The Brownsville bridge in 1974 at Eagle Creek Park.

- Location within Indiana
- Location: Off IN 14, Brownsville, Indiana
- Area: less than one acre
- Built: 1837-1840
- Built by: Mason, Henry
- Architectural style: Long truss
- NRHP reference No.: 73002283

Significant dates
- Added to NRHP: October 15, 1973
- Removed from NRHP: January 1, 1974

Brownsville Covered Bridge was a historic long truss covered bridge located at Brownsville, Indiana. It was built between 1837 and 1840, and was a single span covered timber bridge. It measured 182 feet (55 m) long and 21 feet 6 inches (6.55 m) wide. The bridge spanned the East Fork of the Whitewater River.

It was listed on the National Register of Historic Places in 1973 and delisted in 1974. The bridge was photographed by the Historic American Engineering Record in April 1974 as it was being dismantled for relocation to Eagle Creek Park in Indianapolis. It was instead used to replace the Clifty Bridge in Mill Race Park in Columbus in 1985.

== See also ==
- List of bridges documented by the Historic American Engineering Record in Indiana
