= Lotus, Indiana =

- Unincorporated community
- Location within Indiana Location within the United States
- Coordinates: 39°36′47″N 84°53′24″W
- Country: United States
- State: Indiana
- County: Union
- Township: Center
- Elevation: 1,043 ft (318 m)
- Time zone: UTC-5 (Eastern (EST))
  - Summer (DST): UTC-4 (EDT)
- ZIP code: 47353
- Area code: 765
- GNIS feature ID: 438336

Lotus is an unincorporated community in Center Township, Union County, in the U.S. state of Indiana.

== History ==
A post office was established at Lotus in 1865, and remained in operation until it was discontinued in 1903.
