= Center Township, Union County, Indiana =

Center Township
- Township
- Location in Union County
- Coordinates: 39°37′40″N 84°53′01″W
- Country: United States
- State: Indiana
- County: Union

Government
  - Type: Indiana township

Area
  - Total: 28 sq mi (73 km^{2})
  - Land: 27.92 sq mi (72.3 km^{2})
  - Water: 0.08 sq mi (0.21 km^{2}) 0.29%
- Elevation: 1,053 ft (321 m)

Population (2020)
  - Total: 2,898
  - Density: 103.8/sq mi (40.08/km^{2})
- Time zone: UTC-5 (Eastern (EST))
  - Summer (DST): UTC-4 (EDT)
- ZIP code: 47353
- Area code: 765
- GNIS feature ID: 453194

Center Township is one of six townships in Union County, Indiana, United States. As of the 2020 census, its population was 2,898 and it contained 1,315 housing units.

Historical population
Census	Pop.	Note	%±
1890	2,544		—
1900	2,527		−0.7%
1910	2,367		−6.3%
1920	2,295		−3.0%
1930	2,159		−5.9%
1940	2,368		9.7%
1950	2,748		16.0%
1960	2,772		0.9%
1970	2,751		−0.8%
1980	2,754		0.1%
1990	2,816		2.3%
2000	2,880		2.3%
2010	3,048		5.8%
2020	2,898		−4.9%
Source: US Decennial Census

== Geography ==
According to the 2010 census, the township has a total area of 28 square miles (73 km^{2}), of which 27.92 square miles (72.3 km^{2}) (or 99.71%) is land and 0.08 square miles (0.21 km^{2}) (or 0.29%) is water.

=== Cities and towns ===
- Liberty (the county seat)

=== Unincorporated towns ===
- Cottage Grove at 39.5964394°N 84.8616243°W
- Goodwins Corner at 39.6492170°N 84.8335686°W
- Lotus at 39.6131056°N 84.8899586°W
- Salem at 39.5964391°N 84.8902362°W

(This list is based on USGS data and may include former settlements.)

=== Cemeteries ===
The township contains these five cemeteries: Calvary, Drook, Pentecost, Sering and West Point.

=== Airports and landing strips ===
- E-Z Acres Airport

=== Landmarks ===
- Whitewater Memorial State Park (east edge)

== School districts ==
- Union County–College Corner Joint School District

== Political districts ==
- Indiana's 6th congressional district
- State House District 55
- State Senate District 43
