= Quakertown, Indiana =

- Unincorporated community
- Location within Indiana Location within the United States
- Coordinates: 39°34′35″N 85°0′6″W
- Country: United States
- State: Indiana
- County: Union
- Township: Harmony
- Elevation: 751 ft (229 m)
- Time zone: UTC-5 (Eastern (EST))
  - Summer (DST): UTC-4 (EDT)
- ZIP code: 47353
- Area code: 765
- GNIS feature ID: 452138

Quakertown was an unincorporated town in Harmony Township, Union County, in the U.S. state of Indiana.

== History ==
Quakertown was known as Millboro until 1866.

A post office was established at Quakertown in 1866, and remained in operation until it was discontinued in 1903.

The town was inundated by Brookville Lake when the dam was closed in 1975; the name survives in the name of a local recreation area.
