= Salem, Union County, Indiana =

Salem
- Unincorporated community
- Location within Indiana Location within the United States
- Coordinates: 39°35′47″N 84°53′25″W
- Country: United States
- State: Indiana
- County: Union
- Township: Center
- Elevation: 1,043 ft (318 m)
- Time zone: UTC-5 (Eastern (EST))
  - Summer (DST): UTC-4 (EDT)
- ZIP code: 47353
- Area code: 765
- GNIS feature ID: 442873

Salem is an unincorporated community in Center Township, Union County, in the U.S. state of Indiana.
