= College Corner, Ohio =

- Village
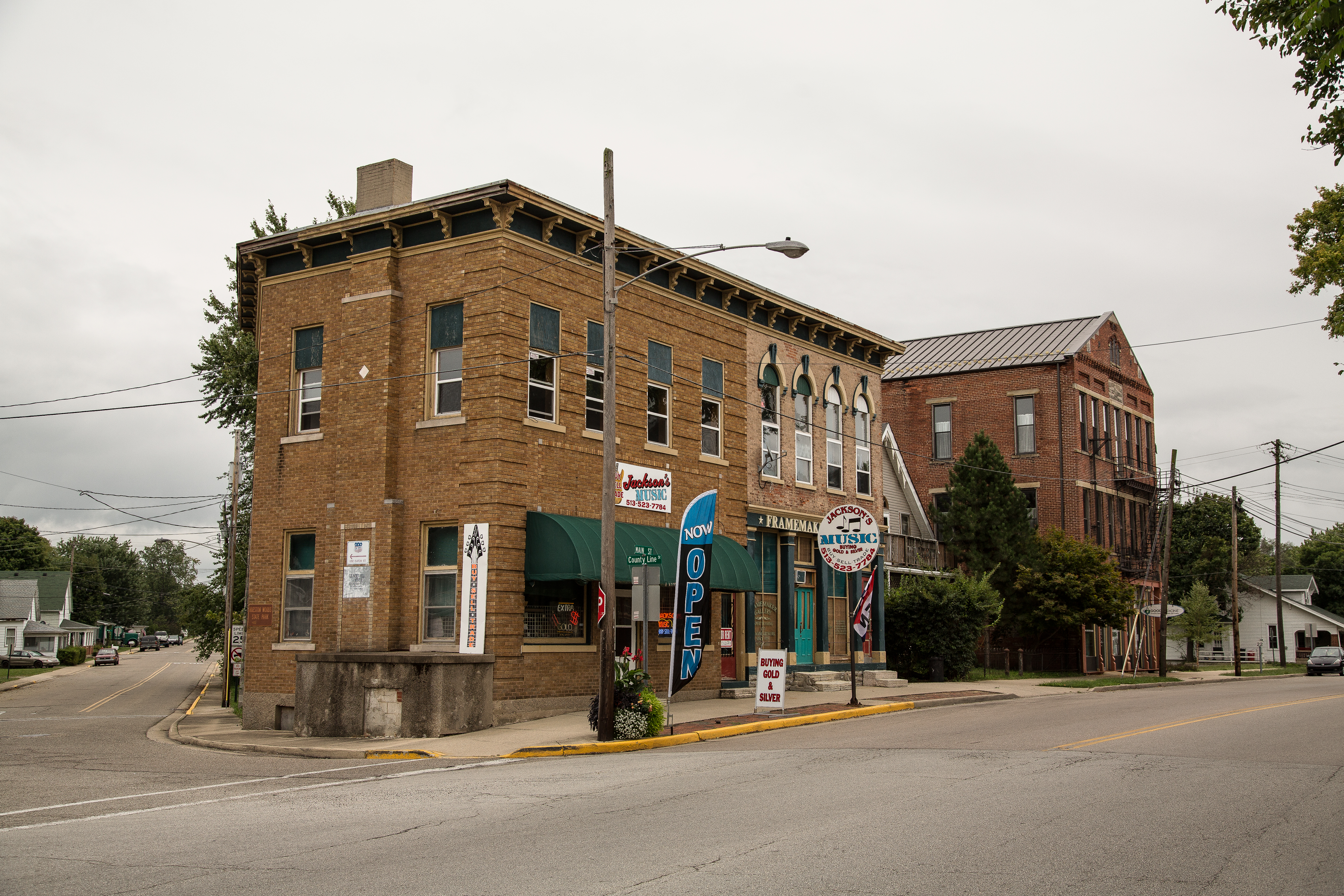
- Corner of Main and County Line streets in College Corner, viewed from West College Corner, Indiana

- Seal

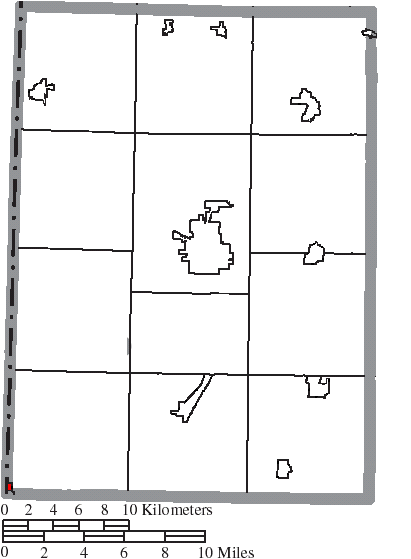
- Location of College Corner in Preble County

- Location within Ohio Location within the United States
- Coordinates: 39°34′06″N 84°48′39″W
- Country: United States
- State: Ohio
- Counties: Preble, Butler
- Townships: Israel, Oxford

Government
  - Mayor: Molly Cason
  - Village administrator: Gage Spenny

Area
  - Total: 0.26 sq mi (0.68 km^{2})
  - Land: 0.25 sq mi (0.65 km^{2})
  - Water: 0.012 sq mi (0.03 km^{2})
- Elevation: 988 ft (301 m)

Population (2020)
  - Total: 387
  - Estimate (2023): 392
  - Density: 1,547.3/sq mi (597.42/km^{2})
- Time zone: UTC-5 (Eastern (EST))
  - Summer (DST): UTC-4 (EDT)
- ZIP code: 45003
- Area code: 513
- FIPS code: 39-16700
- GNIS feature ID: 2398599
- Website: villageofcollegecorner.org

College Corner is a village in Butler and Preble counties in the U.S. state of Ohio. The population was 387 at the 2020 census. The village lies on the state line with Indiana, where it borders the town of West College Corner about 5 miles (8 km) northwest of Oxford, Ohio. The public school, part of the Union County–College Corner Joint School District, is bisected by the state line and is operated jointly with Indiana authorities.

== History ==
College Corner was settled in 1811 and takes its name from its position in the northwestern corner of the "College Township", the survey township designated the previous year by the Ohio General Assembly as the site of the state college that became Miami University. This survey township was later organized as a civil township, Oxford Township. College Corner was laid out in 1837.

== Geography ==
College Corner is located in Oxford Township, Butler County, and Israel Township, Preble County.

According to the United States Census Bureau, the village has a total area of 0.26 square miles (0.67 km^{2}), of which 0.25 square miles (0.65 km^{2}) is land and 0.01 square miles (0.03 km^{2}) is water.

== Demographics ==
Historical population
Census	Pop.	Note	%±
1900	378		—
1910	379		0.3%
1920	348		−8.2%
1930	375		7.8%
1940	379		1.1%
1950	468		23.5%
1960	439		−6.2%
1970	408		−7.1%
1980	364		−10.8%
1990	379		4.1%
2000	424		11.9%
2010	407		−4.0%
2020	387		−4.9%
2023 (est.)	392	▲	1.3%
U.S. Decennial Census

=== 2010 census ===
As of the census of 2010, there were 407 people, 172 households, and 107 families living in the village. The population density was 1,628.0 inhabitants per square mile (628.6/km^{2}). There were 209 housing units at an average density of 836.0 per square mile (322.8/km^{2}). The racial makeup of the village was 97.1% White, 1.0% African American, 0.5% Native American, 0.2% Asian, and 1.2% from two or more races. Hispanic or Latino of any race were 0.2% of the population.

There were 172 households, of which 30.8% had children under the age of 18 living with them, 46.5% were married couples living together, 12.2% had a female householder with no husband present, 3.5% had a male householder with no wife present, and 37.8% were non-families. 33.1% of all households were made up of individuals, and 7.5% had someone living alone who was 65 years of age or older. The average household size was 2.37 and the average family size was 3.02.

The median age in the village was 38.1 years. 23.6% of residents were under the age of 18; 8.6% were between the ages of 18 and 24; 29% were from 25 to 44; 27.1% were from 45 to 64; and 11.8% were 65 years of age or older. The gender makeup of the village was 50.4% male and 49.6% female.

=== 2000 census ===
As of the census of 2000, there were 424 people, 203 households, and 106 families living in the village. The population density was 1,592.5 inhabitants per square mile (614.9/km^{2}). There were 225 housing units at an average density of 845.1 per square mile (326.3/km^{2}). The racial makeup of the village was 98.82% White, 0.24% African American, and 0.94% from two or more races.

There were 203 households, out of which 27.1% had children under the age of 18 living with them, 42.4% were married couples living together, 6.9% had a female householder with no husband present, and 47.3% were non-families. 40.4% of all households were made up of individuals, and 11.3% had someone living alone who was 65 years of age or older. The average household size was 2.09 and the average family size was 2.82.

In the village, the population was spread out, with 23.8% under the age of 18, 11.6% from 18 to 24, 32.1% from 25 to 44, 22.6% from 45 to 64, and 9.9% who were 65 years of age or older. The median age was 32 years. For every 100 females there were 104.8 males. For every 100 females age 18 and over, there were 99.4 males.

The median income for a household in the village was $33,611, and the median income for a family was $40,833. Males had a median income of $31,406 versus $21,964 for females. The per capita income for the village was $14,568. About 6.3% of families and 8.8% of the population were below the poverty line, including 12.5% of those under age 18 and none of those age 65 or over.

== Education ==
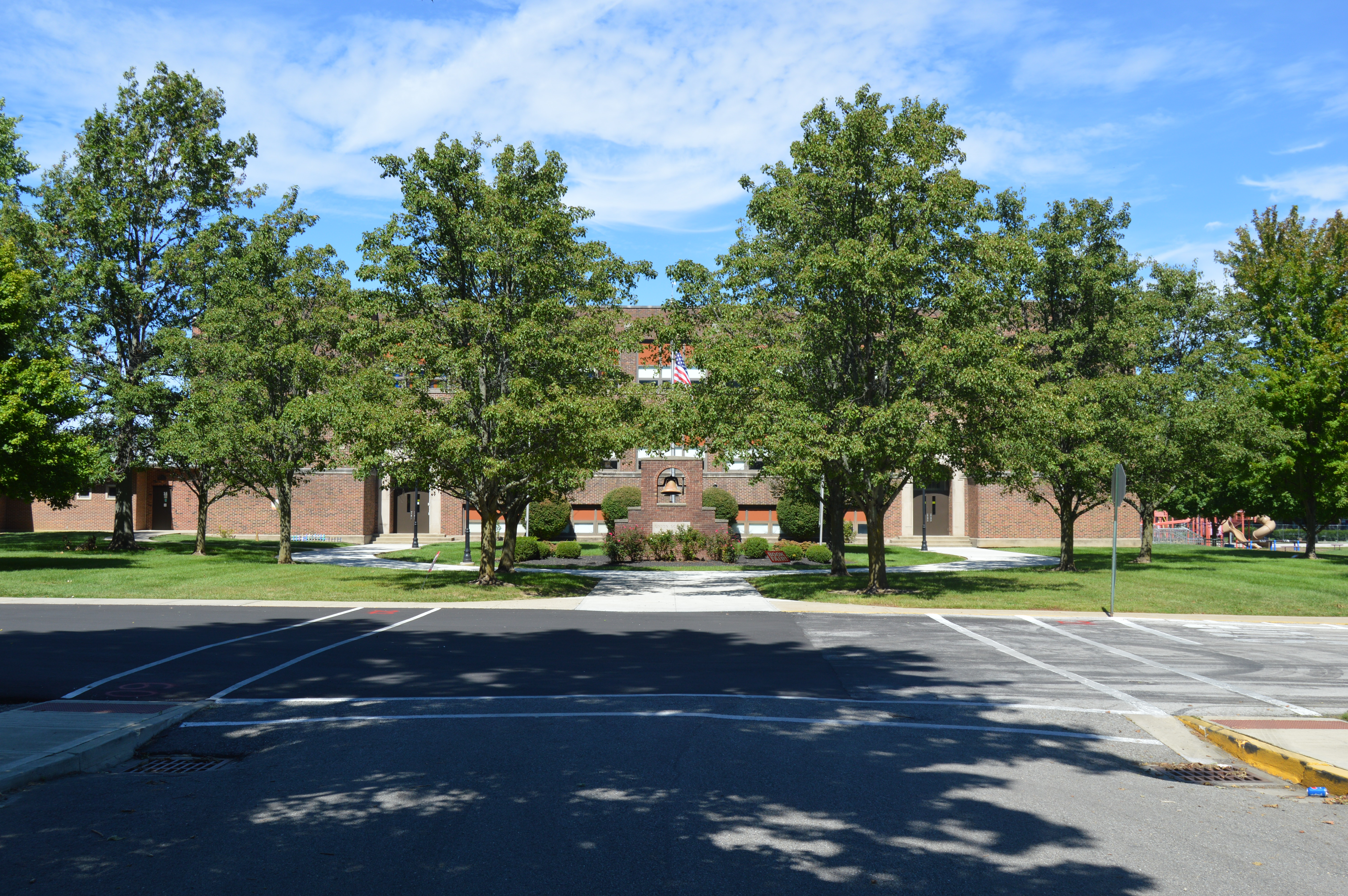
College Corner Union Elementary School; Indiana is on the left, and Ohio on the right

The village is in the College Corner Local School District, which forms a part of the Union County–College Corner Joint School District, a bi-state entity between Indiana and Ohio.
