= Liberty Residential Historic District =

Historic district in Indiana, United States

- U.S. National Register of Historic Places
- U.S. Historic district
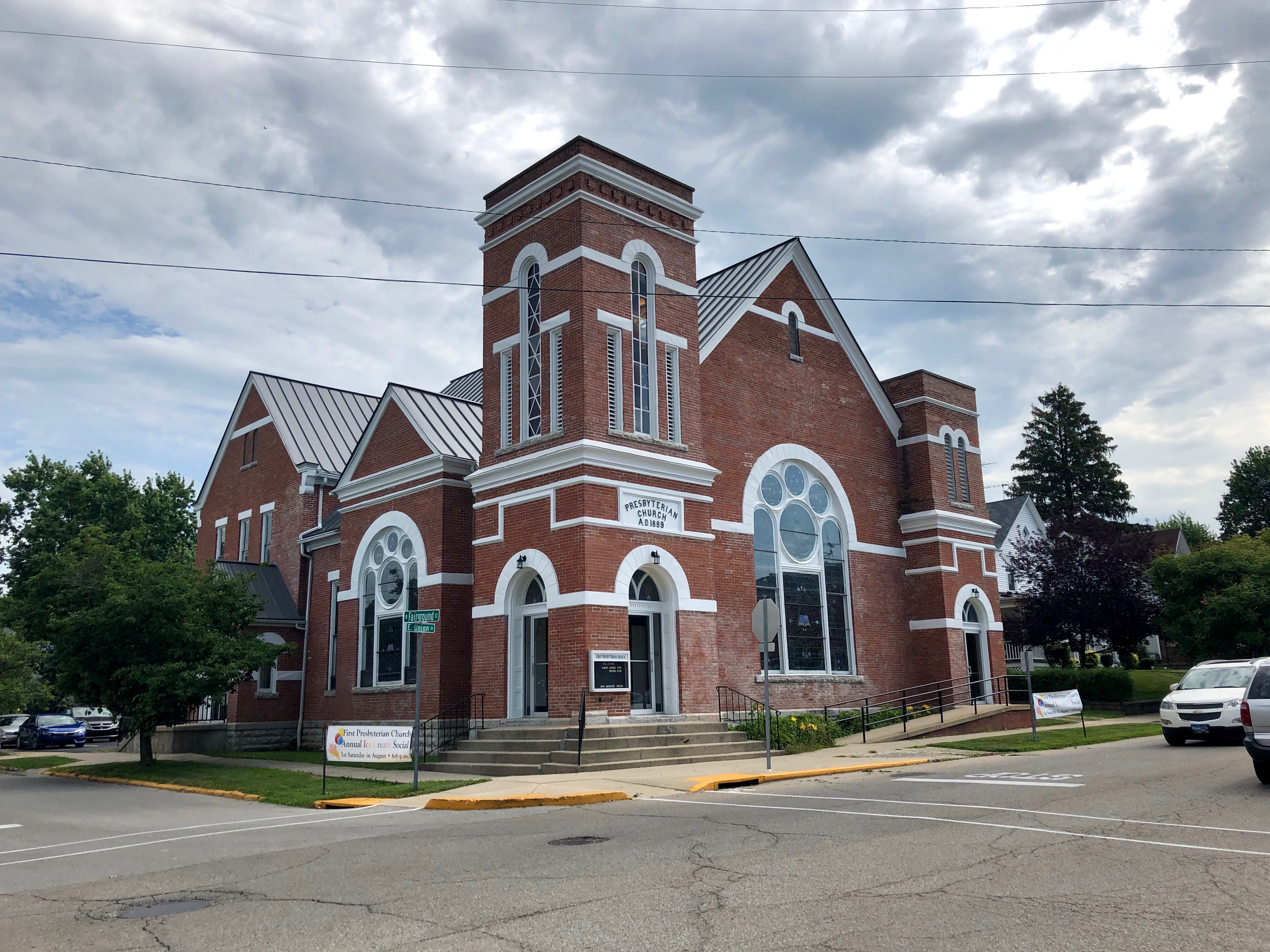
- First Presbyterian Church, A Contributing Structure

- Location within Indiana Location within the United States
- Location: Courthouse Square and adjacent blocks along Union and Market Sts., Liberty, Indiana
- Coordinates: 39°38′08″N 84°55′39″W
- Area: 28.85 acres (11.68 ha)
- Architectural style: Greek Revival, Italianate, Queen Anne, Colonial Revival, Bungalow/craftsman, Ranch
- NRHP reference No.: 13001017
- Added to NRHP: December 31, 2013

Liberty Residential Historic District is a national historic district located at Liberty, Indiana. The district encompasses 67 contributing buildings in a predominantly residential section of Liberty. It developed between about 1841 and 1920 and includes representative examples of Greek Revival, Italianate, Queen Anne, Colonial Revival, Bungalow / American Craftsman, and Ranch style architecture. Notable contributing buildings include the First Presbyterian Church (1889), Union County Public (Carnegie) Library (1915), John S. Nixon House (1879), John B. Macy House (1876), and Union County Seminary (1841).

It was listed on the National Register of Historic Places in 2013.

== See also ==
- Liberty Courthouse Square Historic District
