= Billingsville, Indiana =

- Unincorporated community
- Location within Indiana Location within the United States
- Coordinates: 39°33′21″N 84°54′35″W
- Country: United States
- State: Indiana
- County: Union
- Township: Union
- Elevation: 1,030 ft (310 m)
- Time zone: UTC-5 (Eastern (EST))
  - Summer (DST): UTC-4 (EDT)
- ZIP code: 47353
- Area code: 765
- GNIS feature ID: 431080

Billingsville is an unincorporated community in Union Township, Union County, in the U.S. state of Indiana.

== History ==
A post office was established at Billingsville in 1833, and remained in operation until 1903. Billingsville School was a one-room school erected in Billingsville in 1870 and replaced by a two-story school that existed from 1926 to 1953. The community was named after the Billings family of settlers.

In 1890, the population was estimated as around 100 residents. In 1900, the population was 88.

By 1920, the population was 120. The population was 36 in 1930.
