= Whitewater Memorial State Park =

State park in Indiana, United States

Whitewater Memorial
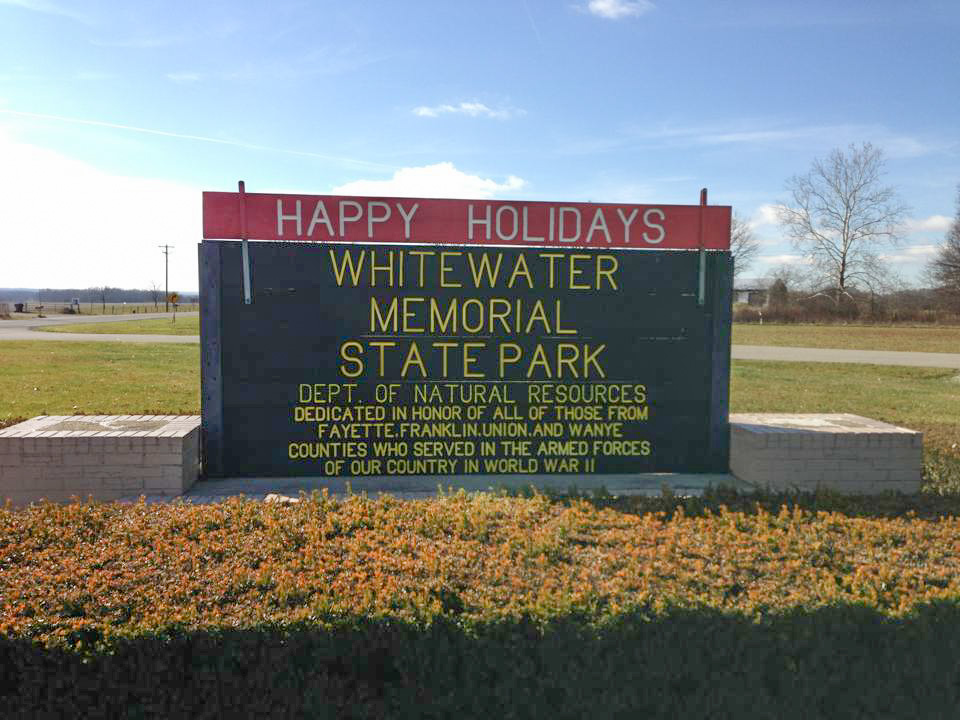
- Entrance sign at Whitewater Memorial State Park
- Interactive map of Whitewater Memorial
- Type: State Park
- Location: Indiana USA
- Nearest city: Liberty, Indiana
- Coordinates: 39°36′50″N 84°57′55″W
- Area: 1,710 acres (7 km^{2})
- Created: 1949
- Operator: Indiana Department of Natural Resources
- Visitors: 240,651 (in 2018–2019)

Whitewater Memorial is the sixteenth state park in Indiana. It is located 47 miles (76 km) in Union County, Indiana, west-southwest of Dayton, Ohio. At 23,000 acres (93 km^{2}), it is the third-largest state park in Indiana; its seventeen miles (27 km) stretches between Brookville, Indiana, and Liberty, Indiana, paralleled by Indiana State Road 101. The park was established as a memorial to those American soldiers who lost their lives in World Wars I and II. The park receives about 240,000 visitors annually.

Part of the facilities available to visitors to Whitewater Memorial State Park include Brookville Reservoir. Brookville Reservoir was created as an artificial lake by the United States Army Corps of Engineers in 1974, spanning 5,260 acres (21 km^{2}). The dam which enables the lake is 181 feet (55 m) high and 2,800 feet (850 m) long. Whitewater Lake itself is 200 acres (0.81 km^{2}).

Popular recreation options in the state park include houseboats, five hiking trails, a nine-mile (14 km) horse trail and lake swimming. Bass, bluegill and other small fish are the attractions for fishermen. An archery range is available by the reservoir. Hayrides are also occasionally offered. Hunters are attracted to the park's deer, rabbits and raccoons. Non-hunted wildlife include woodpeckers and owls. Within the state park is the Hornbeam Nature Preserve, which features the rare hornbeam trees. It is 37 acres (150,000 m^{2}) in area, and was established in 1974.

Whitewater Memorial State Park hosted the Vietnam Memorial Moving Wall from September 4–8, 2008. It was placed at the beach's grassy southern edge. Surviving veterans of the four counties were specifically honored. The park is 1 of 14 Indiana State Parks that was the path of totality for the 2024 solar eclipse, with the park experiencing 3 minutes and 33 seconds of totality.
