= Liberty Courthouse Square Historic District =

Historic district in Indiana, United States

- U.S. National Register of Historic Places
- U.S. Historic district
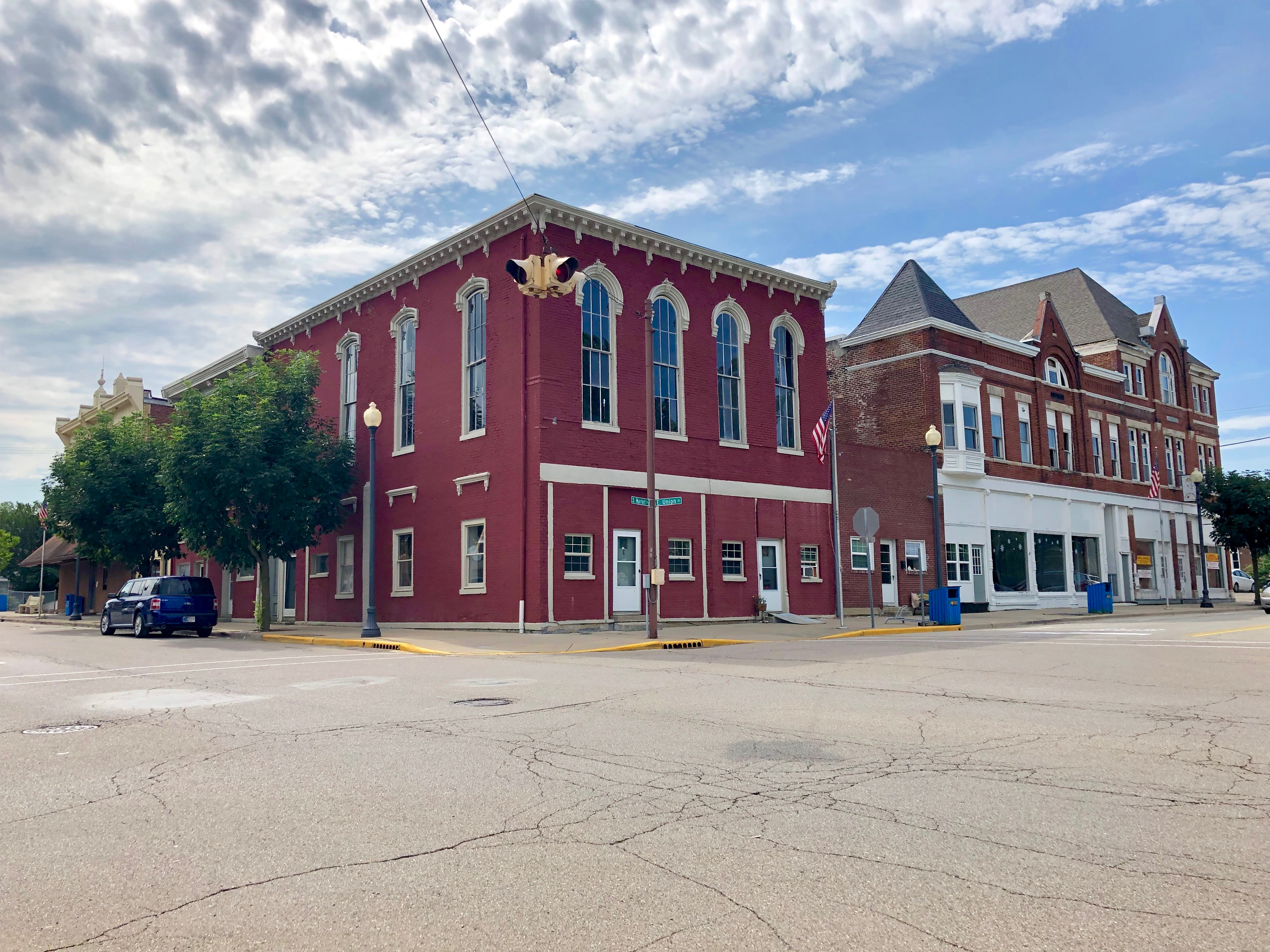
- Buildings on Market Street in Downtown Liberty

- Location within Indiana Location within the United States
- Location: Courthouse Square and adjacent blocks along Union and Market Sts., Liberty, Indiana
- Coordinates: 39°38′08″N 84°55′48″W
- Area: 4.73 acres (1.91 ha)
- Architectural style: Italianate, Romanesque, Neoclassical, Art Deco
- NRHP reference No.: 13001018
- Added to NRHP: December 31, 2013

Liberty Courthouse Square Historic District is a national historic district located at Liberty, Indiana. The district encompasses 20 contributing buildings and 2 contributing objects in the central business district of Liberty and centered on the separately listed Union County Courthouse. It developed between about 1854 and 1938 and includes representative examples of Italianate, Romanesque Revival, Neoclassical, and Art Deco style architecture. Notable contributing buildings include the O'Toole Building (1936), Masonic Hall (c. 1860), Odd Fellows Building (c. 1854), Liberty Opera House (c. 1878), and Liberty Post Office (1937–1938).

It was listed on the National Register of Historic Places in 2013.

== See also ==
- Liberty Residential Historic District
