= Dunlapsville, Indiana =

- Unincorporated community
- Location within Indiana Location within the United States
- Coordinates: 39°35′27″N 84°59′37″W
- Country: United States
- State: Indiana
- County: Union
- Township: Liberty
- Elevation: 774 ft (236 m)
- Time zone: UTC-5 (Eastern (EST))
  - Summer (DST): UTC-4 (EDT)
- ZIP code: 47353
- Area code: 765
- FIPS code: 18-19090
- GNIS feature ID: 433790

Dunlapsville is an unincorporated community in Liberty Township, Union County, in the U.S. state of Indiana.

== History ==
Dunlapsville is named for one of its first settlers, John Dunlap.

A post office was established at Dunlapsville in 1818, and remained in operation until it was discontinued in 1903.
