= Roseburg, Union County, Indiana =

Roseburg
- Unincorporated community
- Location within Indiana Location within the United States
- Coordinates: 39°35′20″N 84°56′49″W
- Country: United States
- State: Indiana
- County: Union
- Township: Liberty
- Elevation: 922 ft (281 m)
- Time zone: UTC-5 (Eastern (EST))
  - Summer (DST): UTC-4 (EDT)
- ZIP code: 47353
- Area code: 765
- GNIS feature ID: 442303

Roseburg is an unincorporated community in Liberty Township, Union County, in the U.S. state of Indiana.
