= Union County Courthouse (Indiana) =

- U.S. National Register of Historic Places
- U.S. Historic district – Contributing property
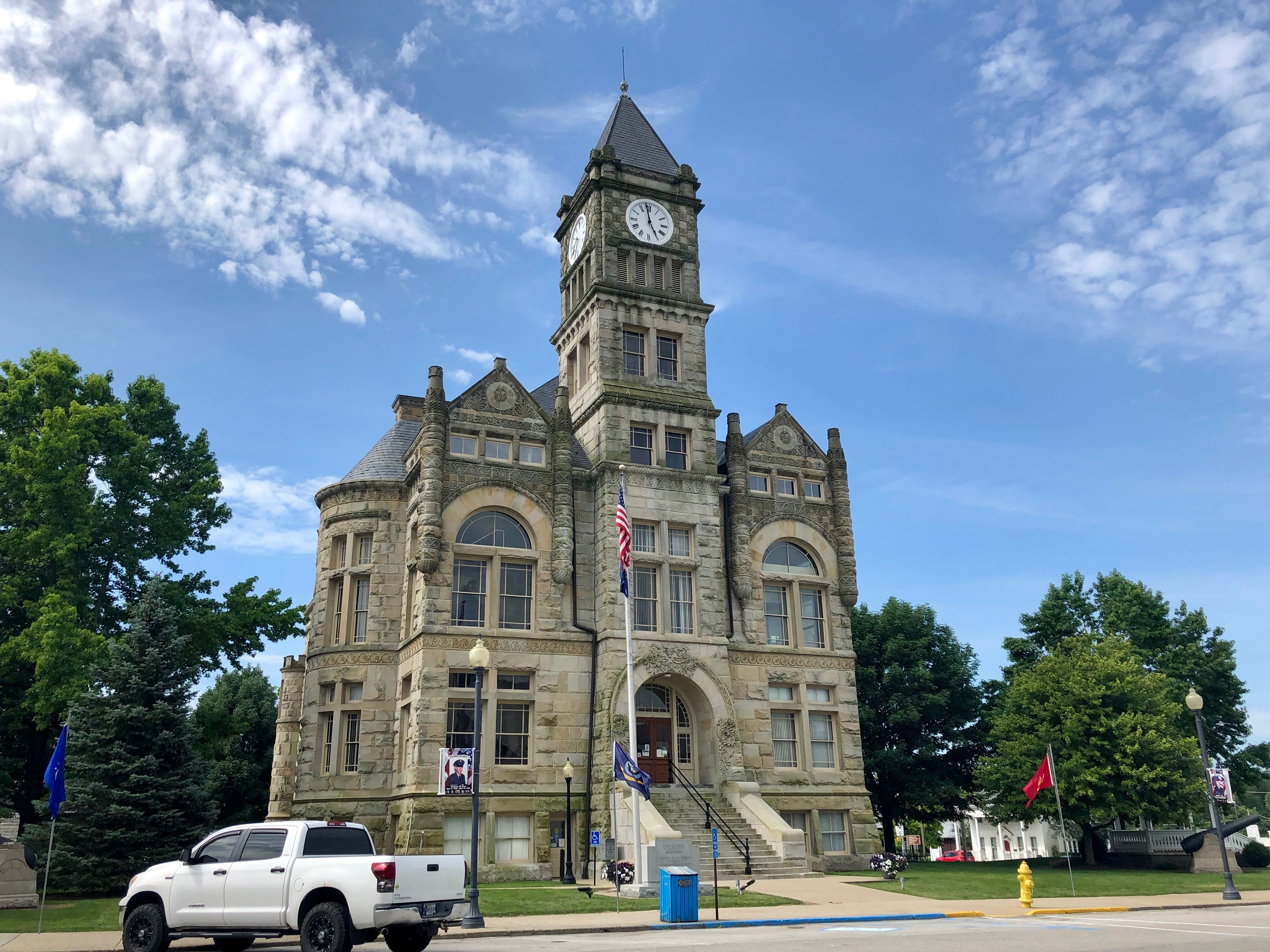
- Union County Courthouse, July 2019

- Location within Indiana Location within the United States
- Location: Courthouse Sq., Liberty, Indiana
- Coordinates: 39°38′5″N 84°55′50″W
- Area: 1 acre (0.40 ha)
- Built: 1890-1891
- Architect: Bunting, G.W. & Son
- Architectural style: Romanesque, Richardsonian Romanesque
- NRHP reference No.: 87000103
- Added to NRHP: July 21, 1987

Union County Courthouse is a historic courthouse located at Liberty, Indiana. It was designed by noted Indianapolis architect George W. Bunting and built in 1890–1891. It is a two-story, rectangular, Richardsonian Romanesque style rock faced ashlar stone building on a raised basement. It has a hipped roof and features an arched entrance and four-story clock tower.

It was listed on the National Register of Historic Places in 1987. It is located in the Liberty Courthouse Square Historic District.
