= Deer Creek (Indiana) =

Stream in Indiana, U.S.

Coordinates: 40°34′19″N 86°41′19″W

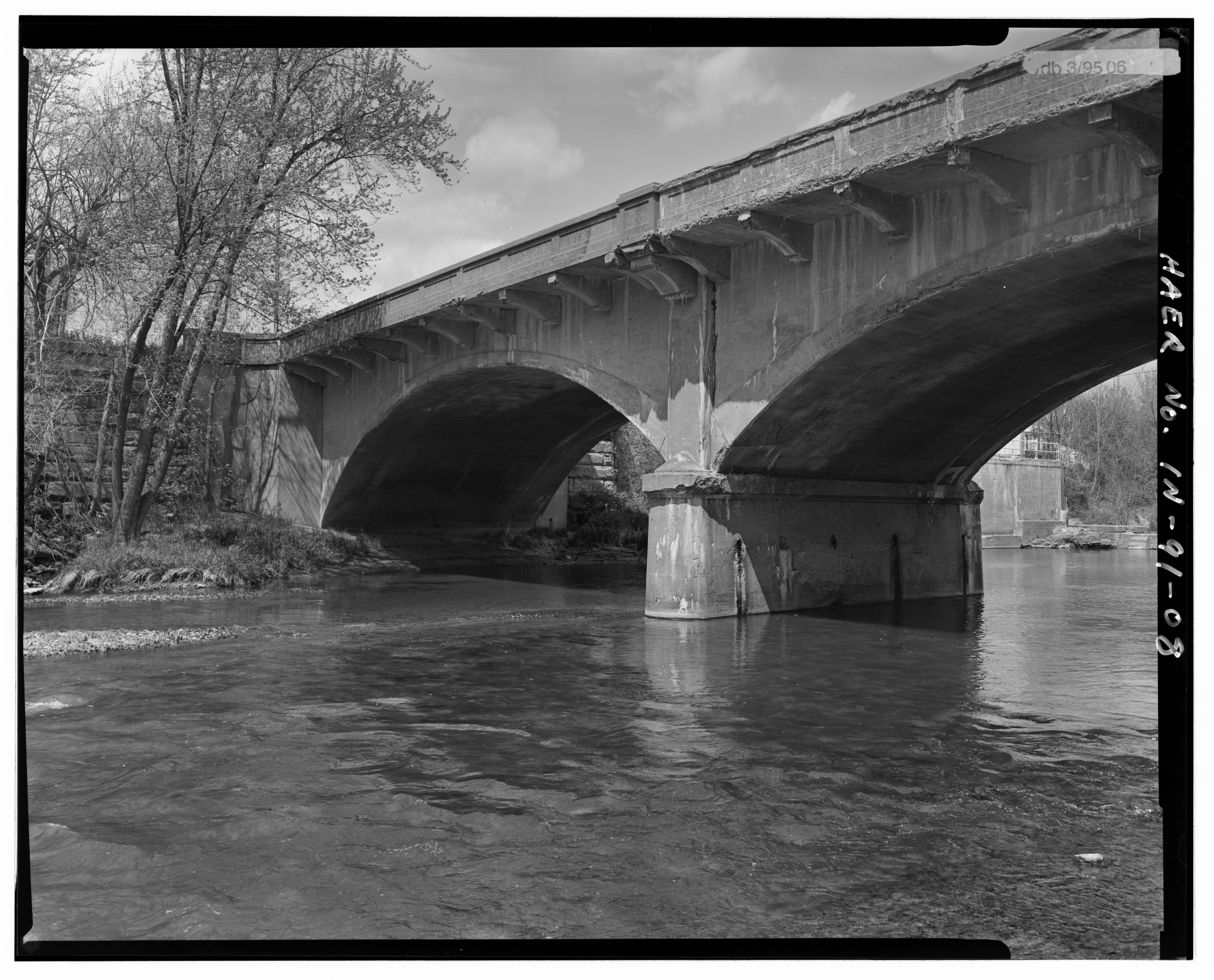
Deer Creek in Delphi, Indiana in 1995.

Deer Creek is a stream in Howard, Miami, Cass, and Carroll counties of the U.S. state of Indiana. It is a tributary of the Wabash River, and its lower reaches are a popular local canoeing and rafting venue.

According to statistics from the USGS station at Delphi, Indiana, the mean annual discharge of Deer Creek during the 21st century has been approximately 330 cubic feet per second.
