= Union Township, Union County, Indiana =

Union Township
- Township
- Location in Union County
- Coordinates: 39°33′53″N 84°52′30″W
- Country: United States
- State: Indiana
- County: Union

Government
  - Type: Indiana township

Area
  - Total: 30.51 sq mi (79.0 km^{2})
  - Land: 30.43 sq mi (78.8 km^{2})
  - Water: 0.08 sq mi (0.21 km^{2}) 0.26%
- Elevation: 1,014 ft (309 m)

Population (2020)
  - Total: 1,464
  - Density: 48.11/sq mi (18.58/km^{2})
- Time zone: UTC-5 (Eastern (EST))
  - Summer (DST): UTC-4 (EDT)
- ZIP codes: 47003, 47010, 47353
- Area code: 765
- GNIS feature ID: 453936

Union Township is one of six townships in Union County, Indiana, United States. As of the 2020 census, its population was 1,464 and it contained 678 housing units.

Historical population
Census	Pop.	Note	%±
1890	1,321		—
1900	1,284		−2.8%
1910	1,254		−2.3%
1920	1,244		−0.8%
1930	1,256		1.0%
1940	1,188		−5.4%
1950	1,244		4.7%
1960	1,299		4.4%
1970	1,321		1.7%
1980	1,397		5.8%
1990	1,500		7.4%
2000	1,546		3.1%
2010	1,622		4.9%
2020	1,464		−9.7%
Source: US Decennial Census

== Geography ==
According to the 2010 census, the township has a total area of 30.51 square miles (79.0 km^{2}), of which 30.43 square miles (78.8 km^{2}) (or 99.74%) is land and 0.08 square miles (0.21 km^{2}) (or 0.26%) is water.

=== Cities and towns ===
- West College Corner

=== Unincorporated towns ===
- Billingsville at 39.5558837°N 84.9096808°W

(This list is based on USGS data and may include former settlements.)

=== Cemeteries ===
The township contains these three cemeteries: College Corner, Crawfords and Keiffer.

== School districts ==
- Union County–College Corner Joint School District

== Political districts ==
- Indiana's 6th congressional district
- State House District 55
- State Senate District 43
