= West College Corner, Indiana =

- Town
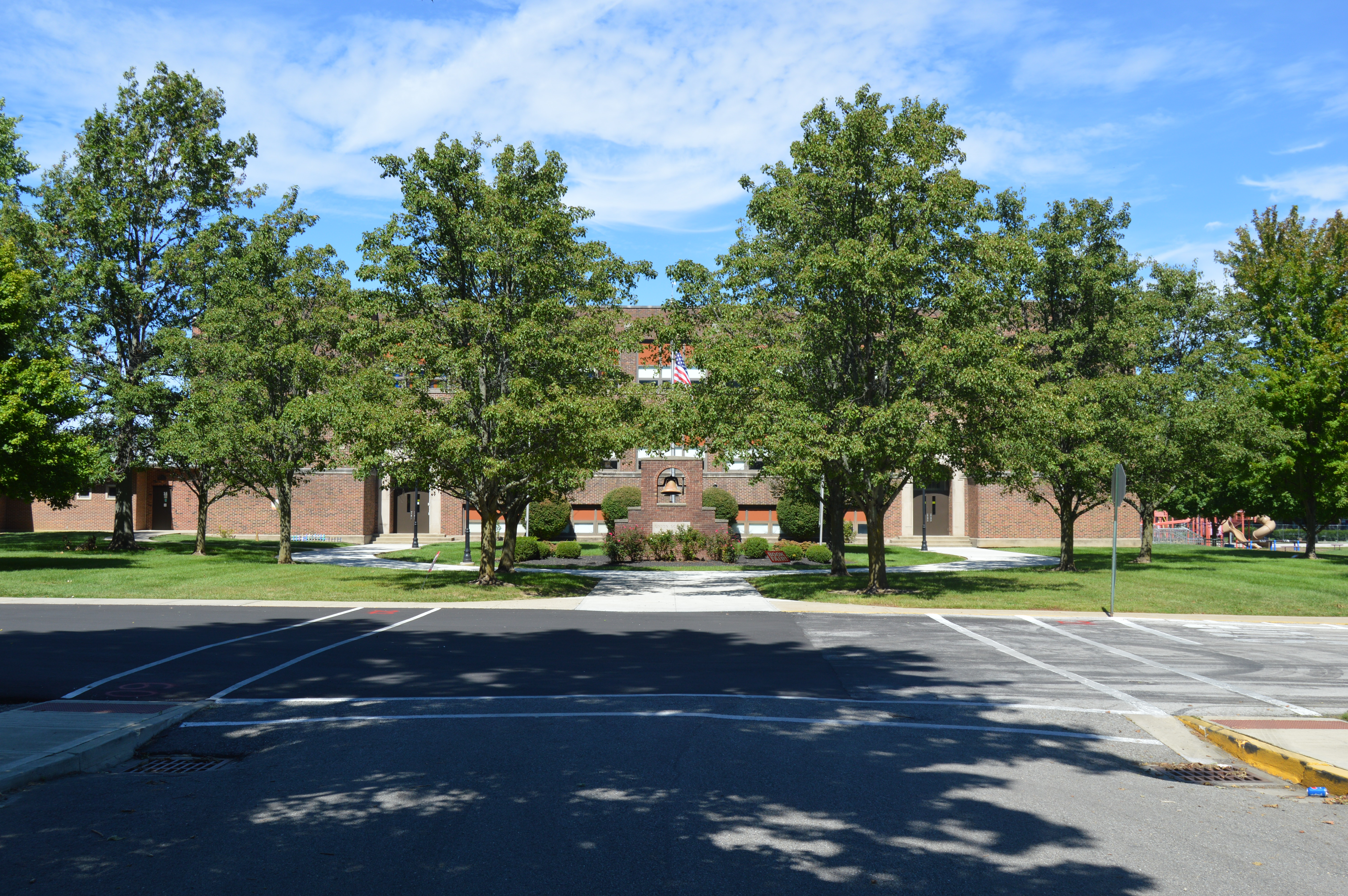
- College Corner Union Elementary School: Indiana is on the left, and Ohio on the right

- Location of West College Corner in Union County, Indiana.
- Coordinates: 39°34′10″N 84°49′08″W
- Country: United States
- State: Indiana
- County: Union
- Township: Union

Area
  - Total: 0.27 sq mi (0.69 km^{2})
  - Land: 0.27 sq mi (0.69 km^{2})
  - Water: 0 sq mi (0.00 km^{2})
- Elevation: 994 ft (303 m)

Population (2020)
  - Total: 545
  - Density: 2,041.9/sq mi (788.37/km^{2})
- Time zone: UTC-5 (Eastern (EST))
  - Summer (DST): UTC-4 (EDT)
- ZIP code: 47003
- Area code: 765
- FIPS code: 18-82556
- GNIS feature ID: 2397731

West College Corner (also known as just College Corner) is a town in Union Township, Union County, Indiana, United States. The population was 545 at the 2020 census. The town is bordered on the east by the state line with Ohio, directly bordering the village of College Corner, Ohio. The town's public school, part of the Union County–College Corner Joint School District, is bisected by the state line and is operated jointly with Ohio authorities.

== History ==
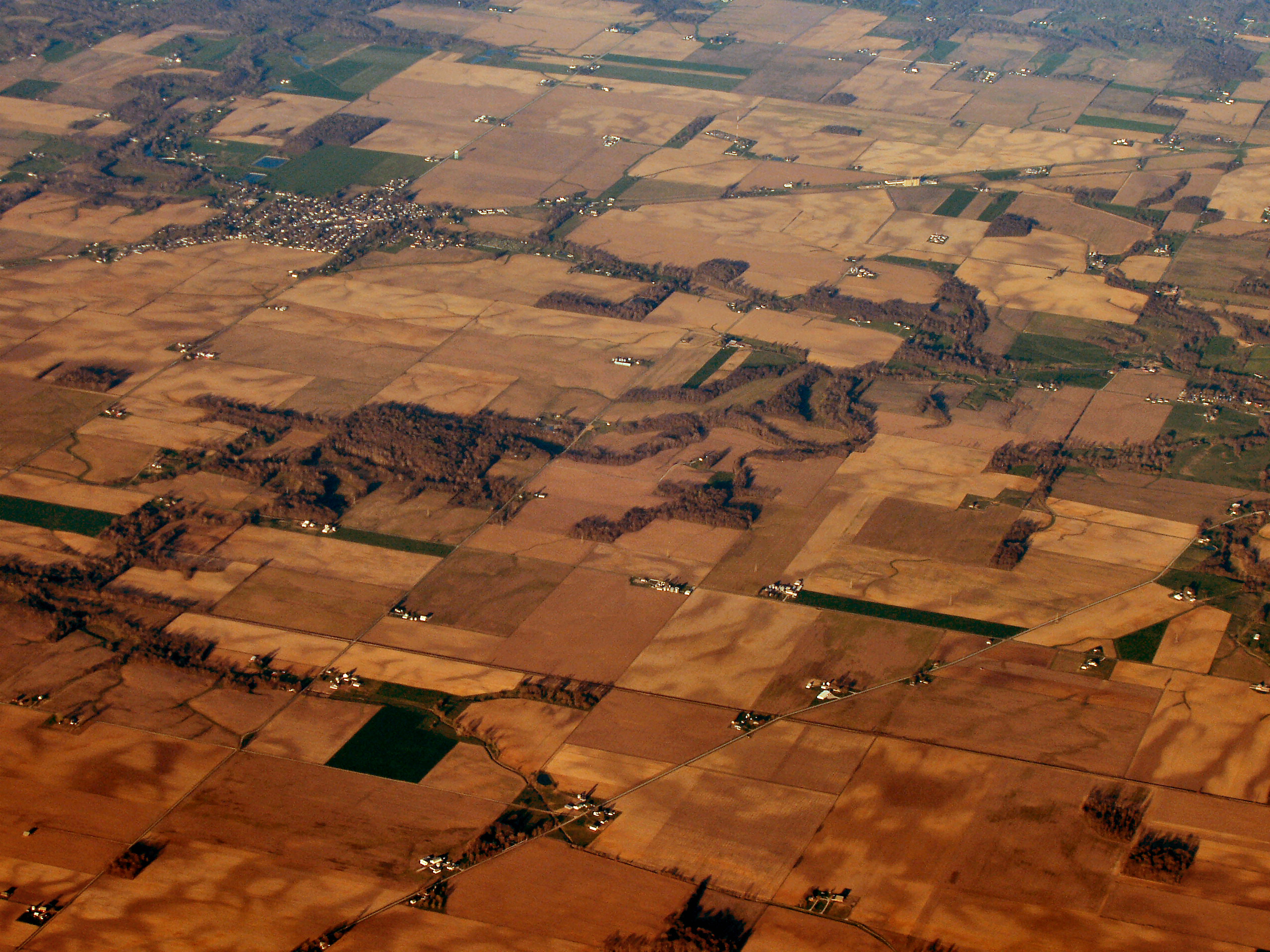
West College Corner, Indiana and College Corner, Ohio from the air.

West College Corner takes its name from its Ohio counterpart, which was in the northwestern corner of the "College Township", the survey township designated by the Ohio General Assembly as the site of the state college that became Miami University. This survey township was later organized as a civil township, Oxford Township.

== Geography ==
West College Corner is located on the border of Indiana and Ohio.

According to the 2010 census, West College Corner has a total area of 0.27 square miles (0.70 km^{2}), all land.

== Demographics ==
Historical population
Census	Pop.	Note	%±
1890	290		—
1900	392		35.2%
1910	432		10.2%
1920	439		1.6%
1930	437		−0.5%
1940	454		3.9%
1950	513		13.0%
1960	613		19.5%
1970	709		15.7%
1980	614		−13.4%
1990	686		11.7%
2000	634		−7.6%
2010	676		6.6%
2020	545		−19.4%
U.S. Decennial Census

=== 2010 census ===
As of the census of 2010, there were 676 people, 274 households, and 174 families residing in the town. The population density was 2,503.7 inhabitants per square mile (966.7/km^{2}). There were 310 housing units at an average density of 1,148.1 per square mile (443.3/km^{2}). The racial makeup of the town was 97.5% White, 0.3% African American, 0.3% Native American, 0.1% Pacific Islander, 0.6% from other races, and 1.2% from two or more races. Hispanic or Latino of any race were 0.6% of the population.

There were 274 households, of which 37.2% had children under the age of 18 living with them, 41.2% were married couples living together, 15.7% had a female householder with no husband present, 6.6% had a male householder with no wife present, and 36.5% were non-families. 28.8% of all households were made up of individuals, and 8.7% had someone living alone who was 65 years of age or older. The average household size was 2.47 and the average family size was 3.07.

The median age in the town was 36 years. 29.1% of residents were under the age of 18; 8.7% were between the ages of 18 and 24; 23.8% were from 25 to 44; 27.7% were from 45 to 64; and 10.7% were 65 years of age or older. The gender makeup of the town was 47.6% male and 52.4% female.

=== 2000 census ===
As of the census of 2000, there were 634 people, 242 households, and 164 families residing in the town. The population density was 2,410.4 inhabitants per square mile (930.7/km^{2}). There were 272 housing units at an average density of 1,034.1 per square mile (399.3/km^{2}). The racial makeup of the town was 98.26% White, 0.63% Native American, 0.16% from other races, and 0.95% from two or more races. Hispanic or Latino of any race were 0.16% of the population.

There were 242 households, out of which 37.2% had children under the age of 18 living with them, 52.1% were married couples living together, 10.7% had a female householder with no husband present, and 32.2% were non-families. 28.1% of all households were made up of individuals, and 11.6% had someone living alone who was 65 years of age or older. The average household size was 2.62 and the average family size was 3.25.

In the town, the population was spread out, with 31.7% under the age of 18, 7.1% from 18 to 24, 32.3% from 25 to 44, 19.6% from 45 to 64, and 9.3% who were 65 years of age or older. The median age was 32 years. For every 100 females there were 98.7 males. For every 100 females age 18 and over, there were 94.2 males.

The median income for a household in the town was $34,625, and the median income for a family was $37,083. Males had a median income of $28,472 versus $21,250 for females. The per capita income for the town was $13,528. About 14.0% of families and 16.1% of the population were below the poverty line, including 22.5% of those under age 18 and 14.6% of those age 65 or over.

== Education ==
The Union County–College Corner Joint School District includes all of Union County.
