= Brownsville, Indiana =

CDP in Indiana, US

- Unincorporated community and Census-designated place
- Location within Indiana Location within the United States
- Coordinates: 39°39′58″N 85°00′08″W
- Country: United States
- State: Indiana
- County: Union
- Township: Brownsville
- Elevation: 794 ft (242 m)
- Time zone: UTC-5 (Eastern (EST))
  - Summer (DST): UTC-4 (EDT)
- ZIP code: 47325
- Area code: 765
- FIPS code: 18-8524
- GNIS feature ID: 2830559

Brownsville is an unincorporated community in Brownsville Township, Union County, in the U.S. state of Indiana.

== History ==
The post office at Brownsville has been in operation since 1821.

== Demographics ==
The United States Census Bureau delineated Brownsville as a census designated place in the 2022 American Community Survey.
