= Union County, Indiana =

County in Indiana, United States

- County
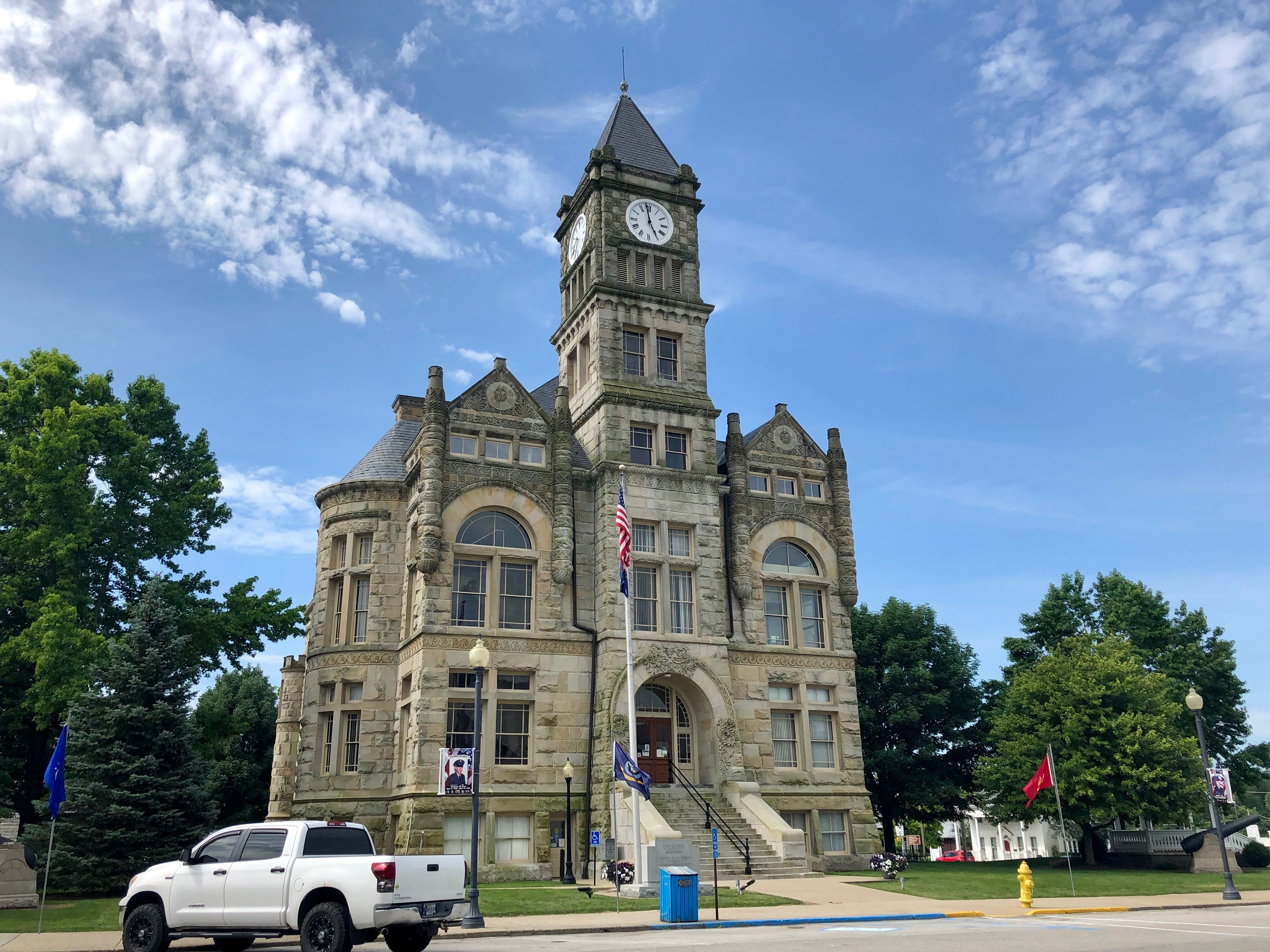
- Union County Courthouse in Liberty

- Location within the U.S. state of Indiana
- Coordinates: 39°37′N 84°55′W
- Country: United States
- State: Indiana
- Created: January 5, 1821
- Organized: February 1, 1821
- Seat: Liberty
- Largest town: Liberty

Area
  - Total: 165.18 sq mi (427.8 km^{2})
  - Land: 161.22 sq mi (417.6 km^{2})
  - Water: 3.95 sq mi (10.2 km^{2}) 2.39%

Population (2020)
  - Total: 7,087
  - Estimate (2025): 6,863 ▼
  - Density: 43.96/sq mi (16.97/km^{2})
- Time zone: UTC−5 (Eastern)
  - Summer (DST): UTC−4 (EDT)
- Congressional district: 6th
- Website: Official website
- Indiana county number 81

Union County is a county in the U.S. state of Indiana. As of the 2020 United States census, the population was 7,087. The county seat is Liberty. Since 2018, Union County has been included in the Cincinnati-Middletown, OH-KY-IN Metropolitan Statistical Area. It is located on the Indiana-Ohio border.

== History ==
Prior to cession to the United States government, this area belonged to and was inhabited by peoples of the Chippewa, Delaware, Eel River, Kaskaskia, Kickapoo, Miami, Ottawa, Piankishaw, Potawatomi, Shawnee, Wea, and Wyandot tribes.

The future state of Indiana was first regulated by passage of the Northwest Ordinance in 1787. In 1790 the Territory was divided into two counties, with Knox covering much of present-day Indiana. The area later known as Union County was included in lands ceded to the U.S. government in two treaties: in 1795 with the Treaty of Greenville and in 1809 with the Treaty of Fort Wayne.

In 1810, a portion of Knox was partitioned to create Wayne County; in 1811 a portion further south was partitioned to create Franklin. The area between those two counties was partitioned in 1818 to create Fayette; by the 1820s the eastern part of Fayette County was sufficiently populated to warrant separate representation. Thus on January 5, 1821, the state legislature authorized the creation of Union County, with areas ceded from Wayne County, Fayette County and Franklin County. The organization of the new county's governing structure began on February 1, 1821.

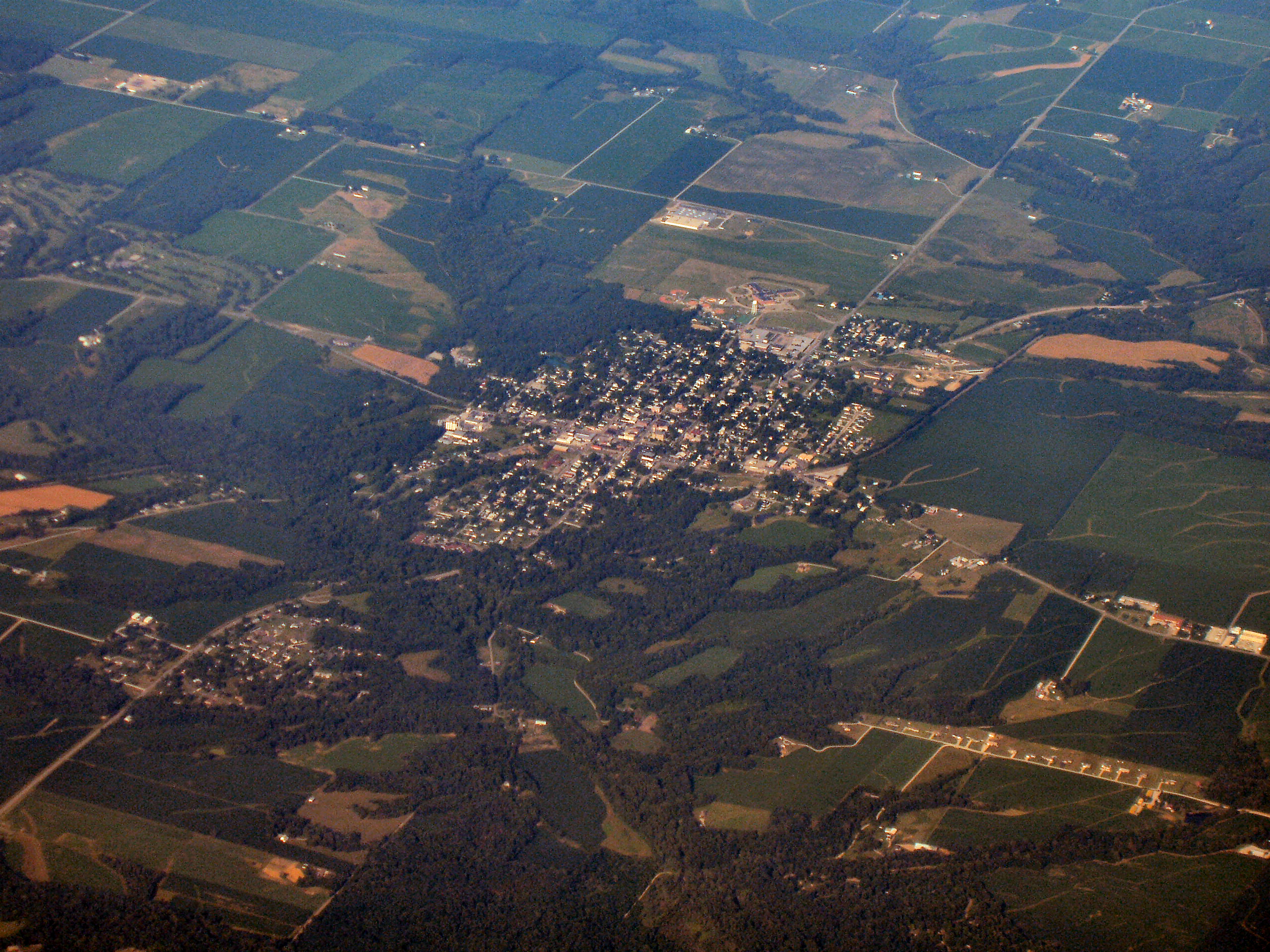
Liberty from the air, looking east

It was so named because it united parts of Fayette, Franklin and Wayne counties. The first non-native settlers were from Laurens District, South Carolina. John Templeton was the first settler to enter land at the Cincinnati land office in what would become Harmony Township, Union County, Indiana. The first county seat was Brownsville, a small community on the East Fork of the Whitewater River. The seat was moved in 1824 to Liberty, a central location. The primary industry of Union County was and is farming.

== Geography ==
Union County lies on the east side of Indiana; its east border abuts the state of Ohio. Its low rolling hills have now been cleared of timber, although drainage areas are still largely brush-filled. The area is devoted to agricultural or recreational uses. The highest point on the terrain (1,140 feet/350 meters ASL) is a rise near the county's north border, 1.0 mile (1.6 km) ENE from Witts Station.

Silver Creek flows southwestward through the northeastern part of the county, discharging into Whitewater Lake. The East Fork of Whitewater River flows southward through the upper western part of the county, discharging into Brookville Lake. The lower part of the county is drained by Dubois Creek, flowing westward into Brookville Lake.

According to the 2010 census, the county has a total area of 165.18 square miles (427.8 km^{2}), of which 161.22 square miles (417.6 km^{2}) (or 97.60%) is land and 3.95 square miles (10.2 km^{2}) (or 2.39%) is water.

=== Adjacent counties ===
- Wayne County – north
- Preble County, Ohio – east
- Butler County, Ohio – southeast
- Franklin County – south
- Fayette County – west

=== Major highways ===
- U.S. Route 27
- Indiana State Road 44
- Indiana State Road 101
- Indiana State Road 227

=== Lakes ===
- Brookville Lake (part)
- Whitewater Lake

=== Protected areas ===
- Whitewater Memorial State Park

Quakertown State Recreation Area

=== Incorporated towns ===
- Liberty (county seat)
- West College Corner

=== Unincorporated communities ===
- Billingsville
- Brownsville
- Clifton
- Cottage Grove
- Dunlapsville
- Goodwins Corner
- Kitchel
- Lotus
- Philomath
- Quakertown
- Roseburg
- Salem

=== Townships ===
- Brownsville
- Center
- Harmony
- Harrison
- Liberty
- Union

== Climate and weather ==
Liberty, Indiana

Climate chart (precipitation, max. and min. temperature)
J	F	M	A	M	J	J	A	S	O	N	D
3 36 17	2.7 42 20	3.8 53 29	4 64 38	4.9 74 48	4.1 83 58	4.3 87 62	3.9 85 60	2.7 79 52	3 67 40	3.7 53 32	3.3 41 23
- █ Average max. and min. temperatures in °F
- █ Precipitation totals in inches
- Source: The Weather Channel
Metric conversion
J	F	M	A	M	J	J	A	S	O	N	D
76 2 −8	68 6 −7	97 12 −2	101 18 3	124 23 9	104 28 14	108 31 17	99 29 16	68 26 11	77 19 4	93 12 0	84 5 −5
- █ Average max. and min. temperatures in °C
- █ Precipitation totals in mm

In recent years, average temperatures in Liberty have ranged from a low of 17 °F (−8 °C) in January to a high of 87 °F (31 °C) in July, although a record low of −31 °F (−35 °C) was recorded in January 1994 and a record high of 104 °F (40 °C) was recorded in September 1951. Average monthly precipitation ranged from 2.68 inches (68 mm) in September to 4.90 inches (124 mm) in May.

== Government ==
The county government is a constitutional body, and is granted specific powers by the Constitution of Indiana, and by the Indiana Code.

County Council: The legislative branch of the county government; controls spending and revenue collection in the county. Representatives are elected to four-year terms from county districts. They set salaries, the annual budget, and special spending. The council has limited authority to impose local taxes, in the form of an income and property tax that is subject to state level approval, excise taxes, and service taxes.

Board of Commissioners: The executive body of the county. Commissioners are elected county-wide to staggered four-year terms. One commissioner serves as president. The commissioners execute acts legislated by the council, collect revenue, and manage county government.

Court: The county maintains a circuit court that can handle all case types. The judge of the court is elected to a term of six years and must be a member of the Indiana Bar Association. In some cases, court decisions can be appealed to the state level appeals court.

County Officials: The county has other elected offices, including sheriff, coroner, auditor, treasurer, recorder, surveyor, and circuit court clerk. These officers are elected to four-year terms. People elected to county government positions are required to be residents of the county.

United States presidential election results for Union County, Indiana
Year	Republican		Democratic		Third party(ies)	
Year	No.	%	No.	%	No.	%
1888	1,108	54.74%	868	42.89%	48	2.37%
1892	981	51.80%	839	44.30%	74	3.91%
1896	1,118	54.06%	915	44.25%	35	1.69%
1900	1,060	52.68%	897	44.58%	55	2.73%
1904	1,156	57.51%	758	37.71%	96	4.78%
1908	1,066	54.25%	808	41.12%	91	4.63%
1912	643	35.88%	705	39.34%	444	24.78%
1916	997	52.95%	826	43.87%	60	3.19%
1920	1,984	58.30%	1,375	40.41%	44	1.29%
1924	1,907	58.77%	1,284	39.57%	54	1.66%
1928	2,101	65.99%	1,069	33.57%	14	0.44%
1932	1,658	50.41%	1,587	48.25%	44	1.34%
1936	1,630	49.20%	1,662	50.17%	21	0.63%
1940	2,009	58.35%	1,415	41.10%	19	0.55%
1944	1,998	63.05%	1,154	36.42%	17	0.54%
1948	1,859	63.25%	1,049	35.69%	31	1.05%
1952	2,159	67.24%	1,029	32.05%	23	0.72%
1956	2,026	63.47%	1,157	36.25%	9	0.28%
1960	2,087	63.73%	1,180	36.03%	8	0.24%
1964	1,531	50.95%	1,463	48.69%	11	0.37%
1968	1,691	56.01%	920	30.47%	408	13.51%
1972	2,043	72.50%	765	27.15%	10	0.35%
1976	1,631	58.25%	1,160	41.43%	9	0.32%
1980	1,766	63.53%	898	32.30%	116	4.17%
1984	1,970	70.36%	816	29.14%	14	0.50%
1988	1,814	65.49%	946	34.15%	10	0.36%
1992	1,394	46.97%	898	30.26%	676	22.78%
1996	1,334	48.86%	1,019	37.33%	377	13.81%
2000	1,838	64.99%	927	32.78%	63	2.23%
2004	2,266	67.76%	1,045	31.25%	33	0.99%
2008	2,061	61.43%	1,224	36.48%	70	2.09%
2012	2,022	65.14%	1,018	32.80%	64	2.06%
2016	2,445	73.76%	715	21.57%	155	4.68%
2020	2,688	76.98%	736	21.08%	68	1.95%
2024	2,698	77.22%	746	21.35%	50	1.43%

== Demographics ==
Historical population
Census	Pop.	Note	%±
1830	7,944		—
1840	8,017		0.9%
1850	6,944		−13.4%
1860	7,109		2.4%
1870	6,341		−10.8%
1880	7,673		21.0%
1890	7,006		−8.7%
1900	6,748		−3.7%
1910	6,260		−7.2%
1920	6,021		−3.8%
1930	5,880		−2.3%
1940	6,017		2.3%
1950	6,412		6.6%
1960	6,457		0.7%
1970	6,582		1.9%
1980	6,860		4.2%
1990	6,976		1.7%
2000	7,349		5.3%
2010	7,516		2.3%
2020	7,087		−5.7%
2025 (est.)	6,863	▼	−3.2%
US Decennial Census; 1790–1960 1900–1990; 1990–2000 2010–2013

=== Racial and ethnic composition ===
Union County, Indiana – Racial and ethnic composition Note: the US Census treats Hispanic/Latino as an ethnic category. This table excludes Latinos from the racial categories and assigns them to a separate category. Hispanics/Latinos may be of any race.
Race / Ethnicity (NH = Non-Hispanic)	Pop 1980	Pop 1990	Pop 2000	Pop 2010	Pop 2020	% 1980	% 1990	% 2000	% 2010	% 2020
White alone (NH)	6,798	6,895	7,237	7,280	6,765	99.10%	98.84%	98.48%	96.86%	95.46%
Black or African American alone (NH)	20	20	17	33	21	0.29%	0.29%	0.23%	0.44%	0.30%
Native American or Alaska Native alone (NH)	11	15	19	19	22	0.16%	0.22%	0.26%	0.25%	0.31%
Asian alone (NH)	10	21	14	19	33	0.15%	0.30%	0.19%	0.25%	0.47%
Native Hawaiian or Pacific Islander alone (NH)	x	x	1	6	8	x	x	0.01%	0.08%	0.11%
Other race alone (NH)	1	0	7	4	12	0.01%	0.00%	0.10%	0.05%	0.17%
Mixed race or Multiracial (NH)	x	x	32	73	152	x	x	0.44%	0.97%	2.14%
Hispanic or Latino (any race)	20	25	22	82	74	0.29%	0.36%	0.30%	1.09%	1.04%
Total	6,860	6,976	7,349	7,516	7,087	100.00%	100.00%	100.00%	100.00%	100.00%

=== 2020 census ===
As of the 2020 census, the county had a population of 7,087. The median age was 42.7 years. 22.6% of residents were under the age of 18 and 20.0% of residents were 65 years of age or older. For every 100 females there were 99.6 males, and for every 100 females age 18 and over there were 96.0 males age 18 and over.

The racial makeup of the county was 95.8% White, 0.3% Black or African American, 0.3% American Indian and Alaska Native, 0.5% Asian, 0.1% Native Hawaiian and Pacific Islander, 0.5% from some other race, and 2.5% from two or more races. Hispanic or Latino residents of any race comprised 1.0% of the population.

<0.1% of residents lived in urban areas, while 100.0% lived in rural areas.

There were 2,923 households in the county, of which 31.0% had children under the age of 18 living in them. Of all households, 52.3% were married-couple households, 17.0% were households with a male householder and no spouse or partner present, and 22.8% were households with a female householder and no spouse or partner present. About 26.0% of all households were made up of individuals and 12.5% had someone living alone who was 65 years of age or older.

There were 3,238 housing units, of which 9.7% were vacant. Among occupied housing units, 72.3% were owner-occupied and 27.7% were renter-occupied. The homeowner vacancy rate was 1.1% and the rental vacancy rate was 7.4%.

=== 2010 Census ===
As of the 2010 United States census, there were 7,516 people, 2,938 households, and 2,117 families in the county. The population density was 46.6 inhabitants per square mile (18.0/km^{2}). There were 3,239 housing units at an average density of 20.1 per square mile (7.8/km^{2}). The racial makeup of the county was 97.5% white, 0.4% black or African American, 0.3% Asian, 0.3% American Indian, 0.1% Pacific islander, 0.3% from other races, and 1.1% from two or more races. Those of Hispanic or Latino origin made up 1.1% of the population. In terms of ancestry, 26.2% were German, 16.0% were Irish, 11.9% were English, and 11.6% were American.

Of the 2,938 households, 34.4% had children under the age of 18 living with them, 56.0% were married couples living together, 11.7% had a female householder with no husband present, 27.9% were non-families, and 23.9% of all households were made up of individuals. The average household size was 2.54 and the average family size was 2.99. The median age was 40.3 years.

The median income for a household in the county was $47,697 and the median income for a family was $49,815. Males had a median income of $39,603 versus $27,394 for females. The per capita income for the county was $19,243. About 8.2% of families and 11.9% of the population were below the poverty line, including 21.2% of those under age 18 and 10.0% of those age 65 or over.

== Education ==
All of Union County is served by the Union County–College Corner Joint School District, the only joint state school district in the state.

== Notable people ==
- Ambrose Everett Burnside (1824–1881), soldier, railroad executive, inventor, industrialist, politician
- Thomas W. Bennett (Idaho politician) (1831–1893), governor of Idaho Territory 1871–1875; born in Union County
- Hiram Rhodes Revels (1827–1901), first African-American member of the US Senate, representing Mississippi 1870–1871; attended the Union County Quaker Seminary.
- Bill Bartlett (fl. 1970s-2010s), musician, guitarist for Ram Jam
- Jay Hall Connaway (1893–1970), Realist painter
- Mary Alice Smith (1850-_), aka Little Orphant Annie
- Bob Jenkins (1947–2021), television and radio sports announcer for ESPN/ABC Sports
- Edward E. Moore (1866–1940), Indiana state senator and Los Angeles City Council member
- Joaquin Miller American poet, author, and frontiersman

James R. Williams Former Judge of Union County, Partner at DeFur Voran LLP and President of the Muncie Community Schools Board of Directors. Presented Sagamore of the Wabash on Nov. 15th 2022 by Ball State University President Geoffrey Mearns and Muncie Community Schools CEO Lee Ann Kwiatkowski, signed by Governor Eric Holcomb

== See also ==
- National Register of Historic Places listings in Union County, Indiana
