= Liberty, Indiana =

- Town
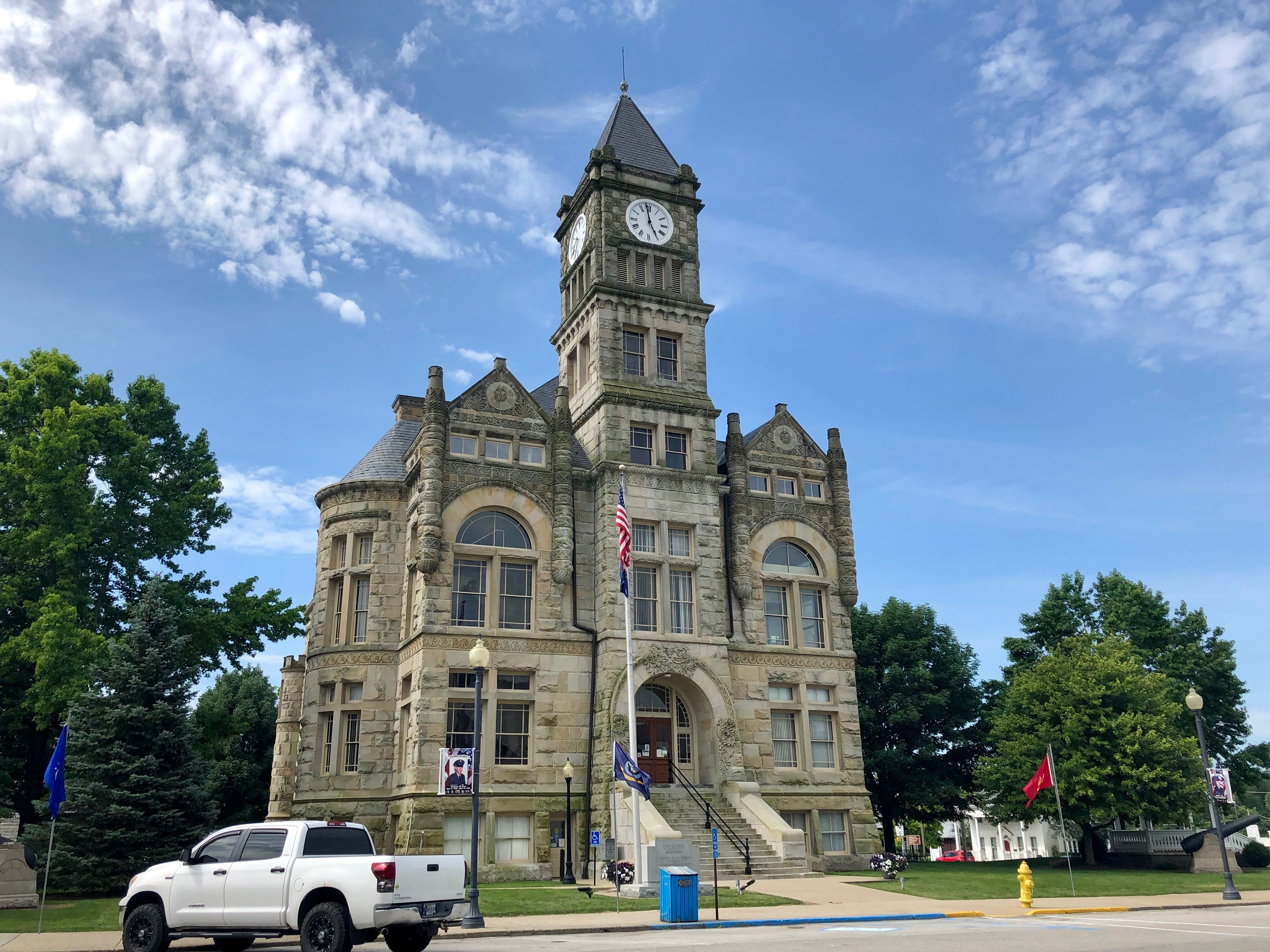
- The Union County Courthouse is listed on the National Register of Historic Places.

- Flag

- Location of Liberty in Union County, Indiana
- Coordinates: 39°38′06″N 84°55′39″W
- Country: United States
- State: Indiana
- County: Union
- Township: Center

Area
  - Total: 0.86 sq mi (2.23 km^{2})
  - Land: 0.86 sq mi (2.22 km^{2})
  - Water: 0.0039 sq mi (0.01 km^{2})
- Elevation: 1,004 ft (306 m)

Population (2020)
  - Total: 2,000
  - Density: 2,331.9/sq mi (900.34/km^{2})
- Time zone: UTC-5 (Eastern (EST))
  - Summer (DST): UTC-4 (EDT)
- ZIP code: 47353
- Area code: 765
- FIPS code: 18-43434
- GNIS feature ID: 2396717
- Website: Official website

Liberty is a town in and the county seat of Union County, Indiana, United States, located about 5 miles (8.0 km) west of the state's border with Ohio. The population was 2,000 at the 2020 census.

== History ==
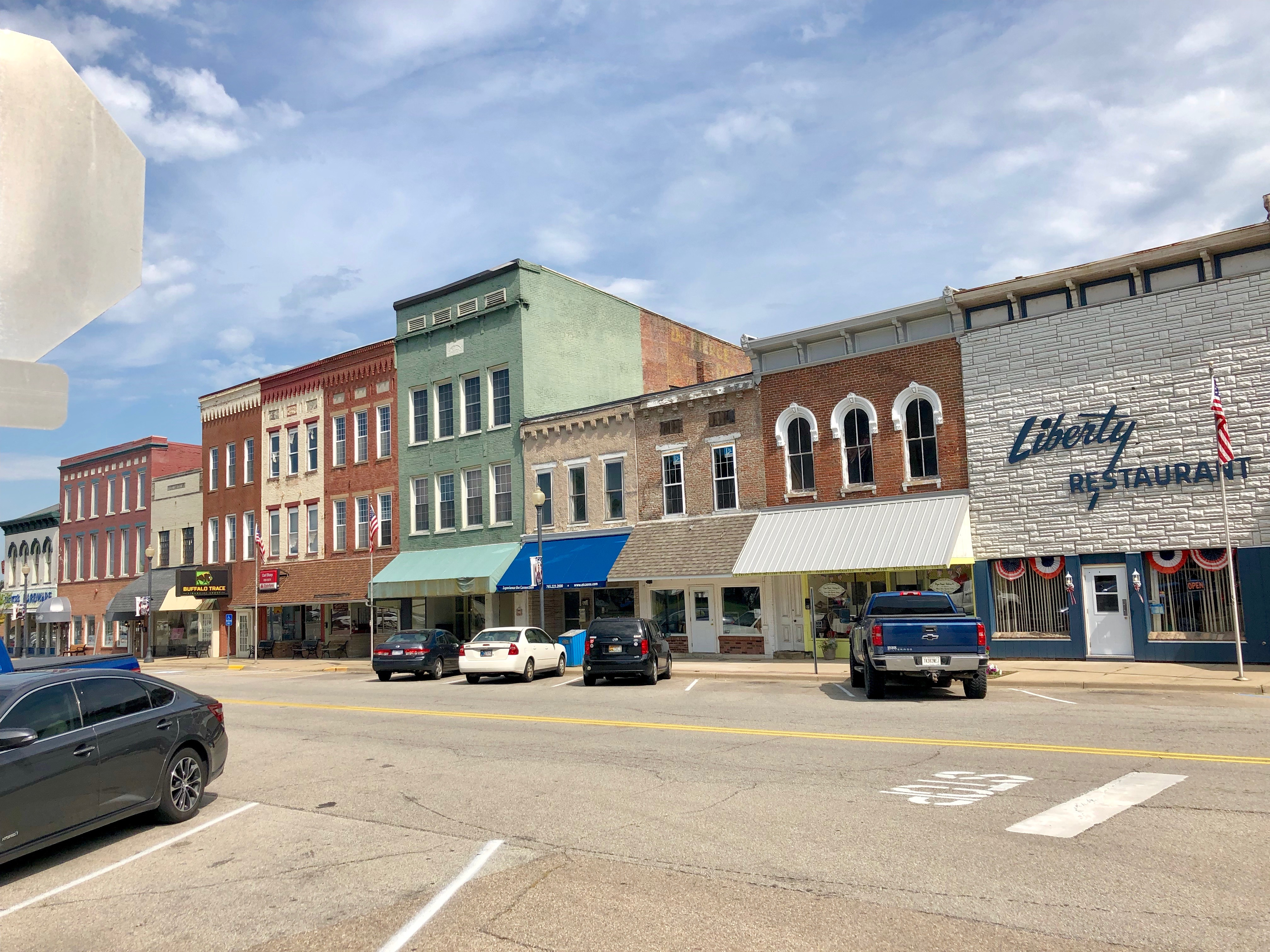
Downtown Liberty

The Liberty post office has been in operation since 1824.

The Liberty Courthouse Square Historic District, Liberty Residential Historic District, and Union County Courthouse are listed on the National Register of Historic Places.

== Geography ==
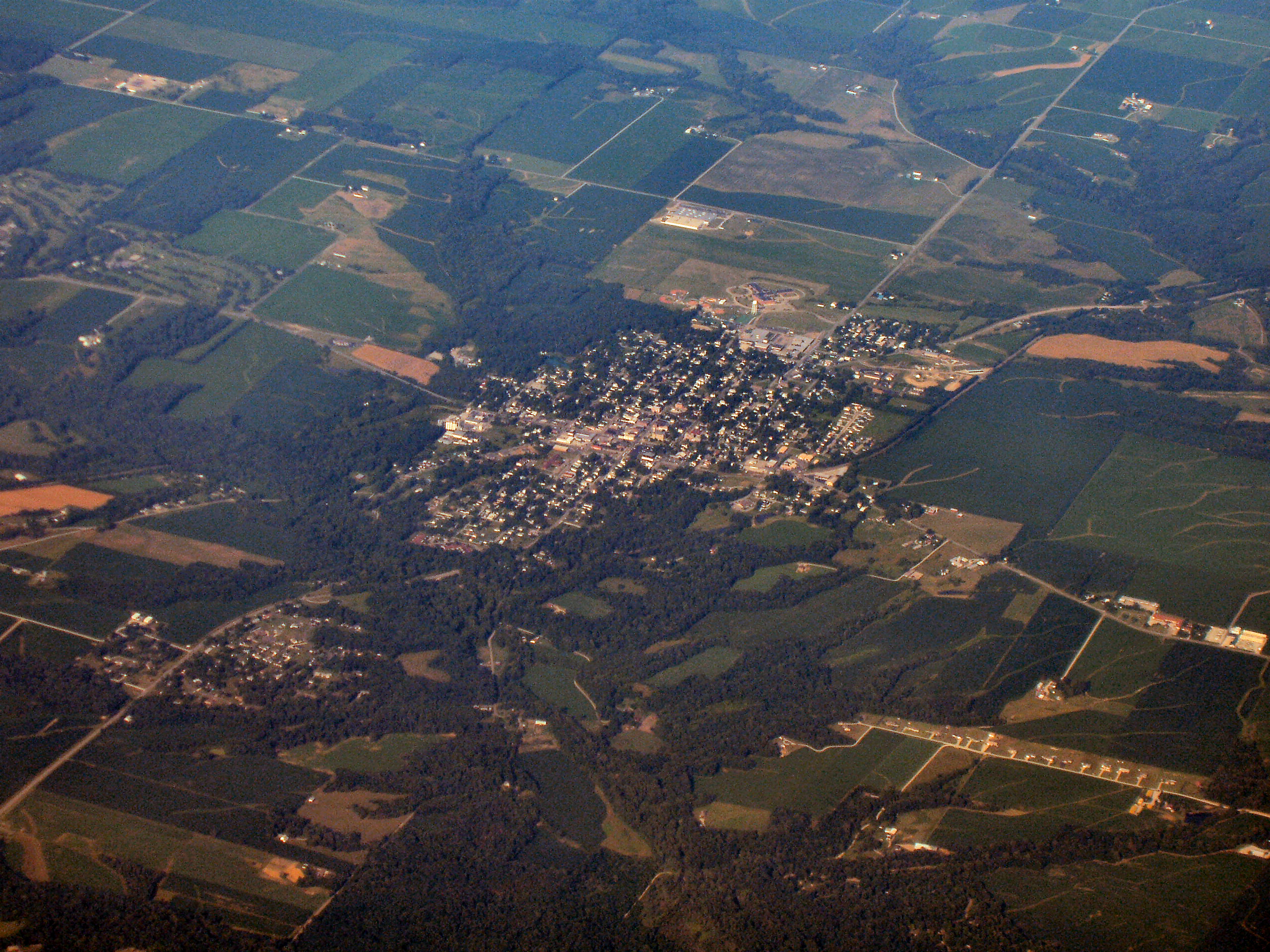
Aerial view of Liberty

According to the 2010 census, Liberty has a total area of 0.86 square miles (2.23 km^{2}), all of it land.

== Demographics ==
Historical population
Census	Pop.	Note	%±
1850	420		—
1860	572		36.2%
1870	700		22.4%
1880	1,096		56.6%
1890	1,314		19.9%
1900	1,449		10.3%
1910	1,338		−7.7%
1920	1,292		−3.4%
1930	1,241		−3.9%
1940	1,496		20.5%
1950	1,730		15.6%
1960	1,745		0.9%
1970	1,831		4.9%
1980	1,844		0.7%
1990	2,051		11.2%
2000	2,061		0.5%
2010	2,133		3.5%
2020	2,000		−6.2%
U.S. Decennial Census

=== 2020 census ===
As of the 2020 census, Liberty had a population of 2,000. The median age was 39.2 years. 23.2% of residents were under the age of 18 and 18.0% of residents were 65 years of age or older. For every 100 females there were 96.7 males, and for every 100 females age 18 and over there were 88.8 males age 18 and over.

0.0% of residents lived in urban areas, while 100.0% lived in rural areas.

There were 839 households in Liberty, of which 30.3% had children under the age of 18 living in them. Of all households, 39.7% were married-couple households, 19.2% were households with a male householder and no spouse or partner present, and 32.1% were households with a female householder and no spouse or partner present. About 32.8% of all households were made up of individuals and 14.8% had someone living alone who was 65 years of age or older.

There were 916 housing units, of which 8.4% were vacant. The homeowner vacancy rate was 1.7% and the rental vacancy rate was 7.9%.

Racial composition as of the 2020 census
Race	Number	Percent
White	1,900	95.0%
Black or African American	9	0.5%
American Indian and Alaska Native	5	0.2%
Asian	17	0.8%
Native Hawaiian and Other Pacific Islander	2	0.1%
Some other race	5	0.2%
Two or more races	62	3.1%
Hispanic or Latino (of any race)	26	1.3%

=== 2010 census ===
As of the census of 2010, there were 2,133 people, 832 households, and 558 families living in the town. The population density was 2,480.2 inhabitants per square mile (957.6/km^{2}). There were 930 housing units at an average density of 1,081.4 per square mile (417.5/km^{2}). The racial makeup of the town was 96.8% White, 0.8% African American, 0.3% Native American, 0.4% Asian, 0.1% Pacific Islander, 0.8% from other races, and 0.9% from two or more races. Hispanic or Latino people of any race were 1.5% of the population.

There were 832 households, of which 39.1% had children under the age of 18 living with them, 44.1% were married couples living together, 18.1% had a female householder with no husband present, 4.8% had a male householder with no wife present, and 32.9% were non-families. 28.8% of all households were made up of individuals, and 12.7% had someone living alone who was 65 years of age or older. The average household size was 2.49 and the average family size was 3.06.

The median age in the town was 34.7 years. 28.6% of residents were under the age of 18; 8.3% were between the ages of 18 and 24; 24.7% were from 25 to 44; 23.6% were from 45 to 64; and 14.6% were 65 years of age or older. The gender makeup of the town was 46.6% male and 53.4% female.

=== 2000 census ===
As of the census of 2000, there were 2,061 people, 858 households, and 548 families living in the town. The population density was 2,366.6 inhabitants per square mile (913.7/km^{2}). There were 916 housing units at an average density of 1,051.8 per square mile (406.1/km^{2}). The racial makeup of the town was 98.30% White, 0.39% African American, 0.29% Native American, 0.19% Asian, 0.19% from other races, and 0.63% from two or more races. Hispanic or Latino people of any race were 0.44% of the population.

There were 858 households, out of which 30.8% had children under the age of 18 living with them, 48.8% were married couples living together, 12.0% had a female householder with no husband present, and 36.1% were non-families. 32.3% of all households were made up of individuals, and 17.7% had someone living alone who was 65 years of age or older. The average household size was 2.33 and the average family size was 2.94.

In the town, the population was spread out, with 24.7% under the age of 18, 9.5% from 18 to 24, 26.2% from 25 to 44, 20.4% from 45 to 64, and 19.2% who were 65 years of age or older. The median age was 37 years. For every 100 females, there were 87.9 males. For every 100 females age 18 and over, there were 79.3 males.

The median income for a household in the town was $30,296, and the median income for a family was $35,817. Males had a median income of $31,038 versus $20,430 for females. The per capita income for the town was $15,440. About 8.2% of families and 11.0% of the population were below the poverty line, including 17.5% of those under age 18 and 7.4% of those age 65 or over.

== Education ==
The Union County–College Corner Joint School District includes all of Union County. The town is home to Union County Elementary School, Union County Middle School, and Union County High School.

The town has a lending library, the Union County Public Library.

== Notable people ==
- Walter F. Bossert, Grand Dragon of the Ku Klux Klan during the 1920s
- Ambrose Burnside, Union Army general, governor and U.S. senator from Rhode Island
- Chad Collyer, professional wrestler
- Jay Hall Connaway, realist painter
- Samuel Duvall, archer, competed in the 1904 Summer Olympics
- Bob Jenkins, NASCAR and IndyCar announcer
- Frederick L. Martin, commander of the first aerial circumnavigation of the globe, commander of the U.S. Army Air Forces
- William McKendree Snyder, landscape painter

== In popular culture ==
In Episode 2 of Series 2 of BBC's Sherlock, "The Hounds of Baskerville", a CIA research project is discovered to have taken place in Liberty.
