= Union County–College Corner Joint School District =

Joint school district in Indiana and Ohio

Union County–College Corner Joint State School District

Location
- Union County, Indiana; West College Corner, Indiana; College Corner, Ohio United States

District information
- Type: Unified school district Joint state school district
- Grades: PreK-12
- Established: 1995
- Superintendent: Aron Borowiak
- Asst. superintendent(s): Al Sustarsic
- NCES District ID: 1811610

Students and staff
- Students: 1,588 (2010–11)
- Teachers: 111
- Student–teacher ratio: 14.31
- Athletic conference: Tri-Eastern Conference
- District mascot: Patriot
- Colors

Other information
- Website: uc.k12.in.us

The Union County–College Corner Joint State School District (abbreviated UC/CC) is an interstate unified school district that serves Union County and northeastern Franklin County in Indiana, as well as portions of Preble and Butler counties near the village of College Corner in Ohio. It is the only remaining joint state school district in Indiana and Ohio. The district, which operates under Indiana law, is governed by a nine-person board of trustees with representatives from both states. Under Ohio Rev. Code §3317.024, the State of Ohio reimburses the State of Indiana for the cost of educating Ohio students, who "transfer" into the district from the College Corner Local School District under an open enrollment policy.

== Attendance area ==
The Union County–College Corner Joint School District of Indiana includes all of Union County, and Bath Township, Franklin County.

The College Corner Local School District includes a section of Oxford Township in Butler County, and Israel Township in Preble County. College Corner straddles those two townships.

== Schools ==
The school district operates four schools:

- College Corner Union Elementary School, College Corner, Ohio, and West College Corner, Indiana — 39°34′20″N 84°48′54″W
- Liberty Elementary School, Liberty, Indiana
- Union County Middle School, Liberty, Indiana
- Union County High School, Liberty, Indiana

== History ==
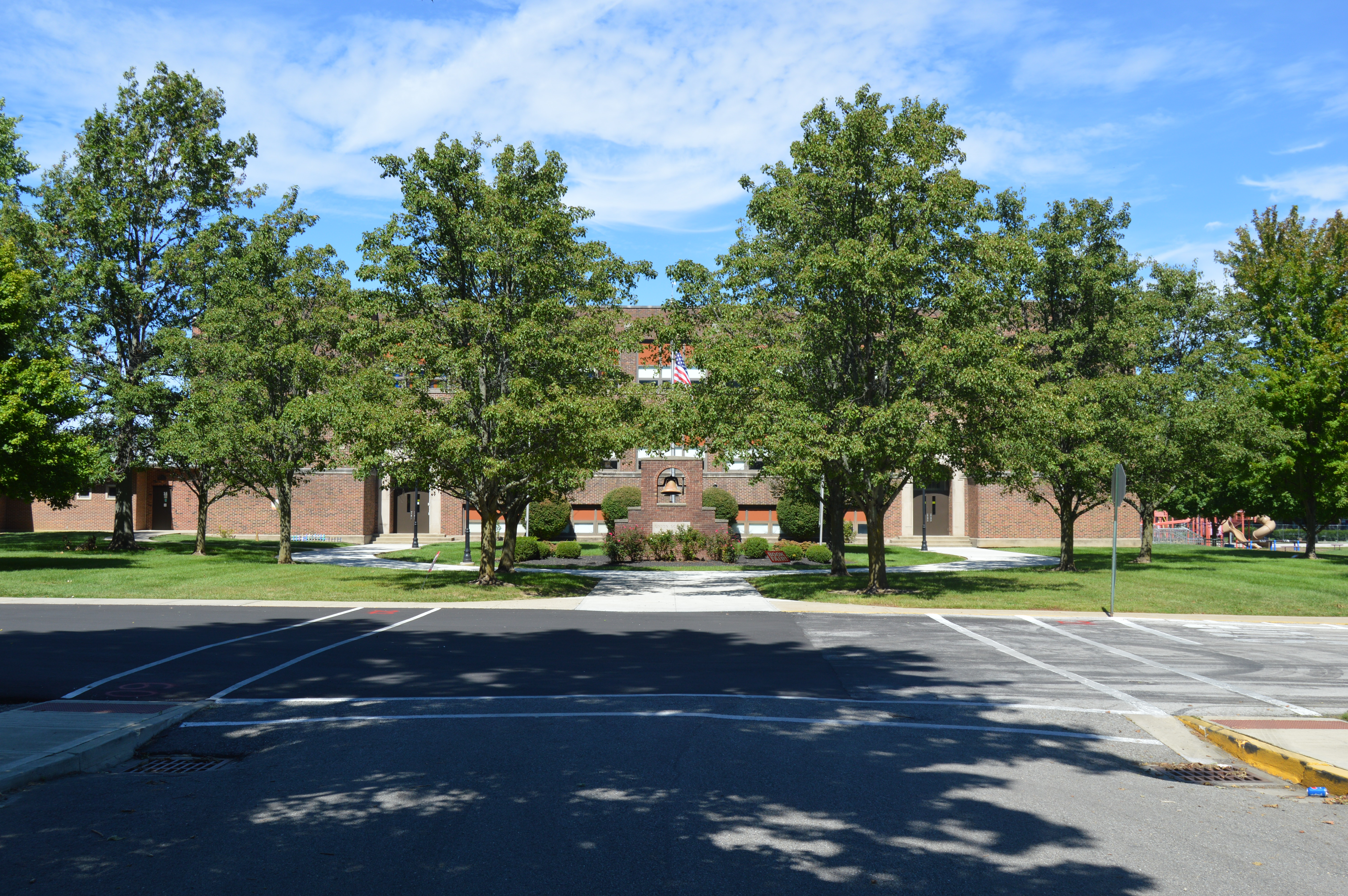
College Corner Union Elementary School: Indiana at left, and Ohio at right

Originally, West College Corner, Indiana, and College Corner, Ohio, operated separate schools. Upon the advice of the Indiana and Ohio Attorneys General, the two towns' school boards organized a shared College Corner Union School in September 1893. Unlike later interstate school districts, which were formed under interstate compacts with Congressional approval, no legislative approval was initially sought for the new school district. Instead, concurrent (but not joint) school boards of three members each oversaw the school and state funding was apportioned by enrollment. For the first school year, higher grades were held in Indiana while lower grades were held in Ohio. The new school building, which cost $12,000 and straddled the Indiana–Ohio state line, opened the fall of 1894. Union Township School later merged with College Corner Union School.

In 1921, the College Corner Joint School District was formed to administer the school with funding from both states. Though the two sides shared a common superintendent, each board continued to meet separately, to satisfy an Indiana open meeting law. The school building was rebuilt in 1926, with the state line running through the flagpole, between the two entrances, and down the middle of the gymnasium's basketball court.

In 1972, the Union County School Corporation was formed from school boards in Union County townships, Liberty, and West College Corner, as part of a statewide school district consolidation program. College Corner high school classes were moved to Union County High School in Liberty. In April 1988, the Ohio State Auditor and Board of Education threatened to withhold state funding for the College Corner district because it no longer offered high school instruction, but the Franklin County (Ohio) Common Pleas Court ruled in favor of the district, citing exemptions passed by the Indiana and Ohio General Assemblies in 1912. In 1995, a federal magistrate merged the College Corner Joint School District and Union County School Corporation into the Union County–College Corner Joint School District.

== Governance ==
The board of trustees has nine members, with representation from both states.

== Athletics ==
College Corner High School's athletic teams were known as the Trojans. They competed in the Preble County League in Ohio from 1907 to 1974. From 1940 to 1968, they additionally competed in the Whitewater Valley Conference in Indiana. The school's 1926 football team was its last despite a 30–2 record because players had been brought in from nearby Miami University. The Ohio High School Athletic Association banned the team for 100 years when the deception was discovered.

== See also ==
- Dresden School District – Interstate school district in New Hampshire and Vermont, formed by interstate compact
