= Lakeshore Resort, Indiana =

- Census-designated place
- Location within Indiana Location within the United States
- Coordinates: 39°30′52″N 85°01′15″W
- Country: United States
- State: Indiana
- County: Franklin
- Townships: Fairfield, Blooming Grove

Area
  - Total: 0.379 sq mi (0.98 km^{2})
  - Land: 0.378 sq mi (0.98 km^{2})
  - Water: 0.001 sq mi (0.0026 km^{2})
- Elevation: 968 ft (295 m)
- Time zone: UTC-5 (Eastern (EST))
  - Summer (DST): UTC-4 (EDT)
- ZIP code: 47012 (Brookville)
- Area code: 765
- FIPS code: 18-41463
- GNIS feature ID: 2830379

Lakeshore Resort is an unincorporated community and census-designated place (CDP) in Franklin County, Indiana, United States.

== Geography ==
The community is in northern Franklin County, west of Brookville Lake, a reservoir on the East Fork of the Whitewater River. It is 3 miles (5 km) east of Blooming Grove, 6 miles (10 km) north of Brookville and 14 miles (23 km) southeast of Connersville.

According to the United States Census Bureau, the Lakeshore Resort CDP has a total area of 0.38 square miles (0.98 km^{2}), of which 0.001 square miles (0.003 km^{2}), or 0.26%, are water.

== Demographics ==
The United States Census Bureau delineated Lakeshore Resort as a census designated place in the 2022 American Community Survey.
