= Blooming Grove =

Blooming Grove can refer to:

- Blooming Grove, Indiana
- Blooming Grove Township, Indiana
- Blooming Grove Township, Minnesota
- Blooming Grove, New York
- Blooming Grove Township, Pennsylvania
- Blooming Grove, Ohio
- Blooming Grove (Florence, South Carolina), a historic house
- Blooming Grove, Texas
- Blooming Grove, Wisconsin
