= Brookville Township, Franklin County, Indiana =

Brookville Township
- Township
- Location of Brookville Township in Franklin County
- Coordinates: 39°25′16″N 85°00′25″W
- Country: United States
- State: Indiana
- County: Franklin

Government
  - Type: Indiana township

Area
  - Total: 67.09 sq mi (173.8 km^{2})
  - Land: 64.25 sq mi (166.4 km^{2})
  - Water: 2.83 sq mi (7.3 km^{2})
- Elevation: 630 ft (192 m)

Population (2020)
  - Total: 5,728
  - Density: 89.15/sq mi (34.42/km^{2})
- FIPS code: 18-08200
- GNIS feature ID: 453136

Brookville Township is one of thirteen townships in Franklin County, Indiana. As of the 2020 census, its population was 5,728, slightly down from 5,773 at 2010.

== Geography ==
According to the 2010 census, the township has a total area of 67.09 square miles (173.8 km^{2}), of which 64.25 square miles (166.4 km^{2}) (or 95.77%) is land and 2.83 square miles (7.3 km^{2}) (or 4.22%) is water.

=== Cities and towns ===
- Brookville (the county seat)

=== Unincorporated towns ===
- Mound Haven
- Stavetown
- Whitcomb
- Yellow Bank
- Youngs Corner

(This list is based on USGS data and may include former settlements.)

=== Adjacent townships ===
- Fairfield Township (north)
- Bath Township (northeast)
- Springfield Township (east)
- Whitewater Township (southeast)
- Highland Township (south)
- Butler Township (southwest)
- Metamora Township (west)
- Blooming Grove Township (northwest)

=== Major highways ===
- U.S. Route 52
- Indiana State Road 1
- Indiana State Road 101
- Indiana State Road 252

=== Cemeteries ===
The township contains three cemeteries: Maple Grove, Saint Michaels and Usher.

== Demographics ==
Historical population
Census	Pop.	Note	%±
1890	4,270		—
1900	3,998		−6.4%
1910	3,891		−2.7%
1920	3,942		1.3%
1930	3,949		0.2%
1940	3,838		−2.8%
1950	4,430		15.4%
1960	4,755		7.3%
1970	4,882		2.7%
1980	5,294		8.4%
1990	5,565		5.1%
2000	5,800		4.2%
2010	5,773		−0.5%
2020	5,728		−0.8%
Source: US Decennial Census

As of the 2020 census, there were 5,728 people, 2,315 households, and 2,600 housing units. The racial makeup of the township was; 5,506 were White alone, 18 were American Indian/Alaska Native alone, 18 were Asian alone, 3 were Black/African American alone, 16 were of some other race, and 167 were two or more races. 56 were Hispanic/Latino of any race. The ancestry makeup of the township was; 25.1% German, 13.6% Irish, 13.4% English, 2.1% French (except Basque), 2.1% Scottish, 0.8% Italian, and 0.6% Polish. Of spoken languages; 97.7% only spoke English at home, 0.7% spoke Spanish at home, and 1.6% spoke Asian/Pacific Islander languages at home.

The median income of the township was $63,603. 10% were under the poverty line. Homeownership was 67.5% within the township. Of the 2,335 occupied housing units within the township, 909 were married, 37 had a male householder with no spouse present, and 161 had a female householder with no spouse present. 13.2% had one bedroom, 70.4% had 2 or 3 bedrooms, and 16.4% had 4 or more bedrooms. Of all housing units, 265 are vacant.

The gender makeup of the township was; Of males; 248 were under 5 years of age, 133 were between the ages of 5–9 years, 217 were between the ages of 10–14 years, 149 were between the ages of 15–19 years, 210 were between the ages of 20–24 years, 237 were between the ages of 25–29 years, 121 were between the ages of 30–34 years, 194 were between the ages of 35–39 years, 153 were between the ages of 40–44 years, 206 were between the ages of 45–49, 147 were between the ages of 50–54 years, 193 were between the ages of 55–59 years, 164 were between the ages of 60–64 years, 57 were between the ages of 65–69 years, 147 were between the ages of 70–74 years, 54 were between the ages of 75–79 years, 71 were between the ages of 80–84 years, and 65 were over 85 years of age. Of females; 216 were under 5 years of age, 124 were between the ages of 5–9 years, 100 were between the ages of 10–14 years, 81 were between the ages of 15–19 years, 199 were between the ages of 20–24 years, 265 were between the ages of 25–29 years, 119 were between the ages of 30–34 years, 162 were between the ages of 35–39 years, 155 were between the ages of 40–44 years, 230 were between the ages of 45–49, 146 were between the ages of 50–54 years, 221 were between the ages of 55–59 years, 173 were between the ages of 60–64 years, 217 were between the ages of 65–69 years, 207 were between the ages of 70–74 years, 66 were between the ages of 75–79 years, 68 were between the ages of 80–84 years, and 181 were over 85 years of age. The median age of the township was 41.1.

Of education and employment, 42.7% had a high school or equivalent degree, 20.7% went to college but had no degree, 4.6% had an associate degree, 11.6% had a bachelor's degree, and 8.5% had a graduate or professional degree. School enrollment was 65.8%, of which, in nursery school or preschool was 4.6%, in kindergarten to 12th grade was 65.8%. Of employers, 70.9% were employees of private companies, 4.3% were self-employed in their own incorporated business workers, 13% were private not-for-profit wage and salary workers, 10% were local, state, and federal government workers, and 1.7% self-employed on their own, not incorporated business workers, or are unpaid family workers. The employment rate was 61.8%

== Education ==
Brookville Township residents may obtain a free library card from the Franklin County Public Library District in Brookville.
