= Millville =

Millville may refer to:

== Canada ==
- Millville, New Brunswick
- Millville, Newfoundland and Labrador
- Millville, Nova Scotia

== United States ==
- Millville, Arizona, a ghost town in Cochise County
- Millville, California
- Millville, Delaware
- Millville, Florida
- Millville, Illinois (Jo Daviess County), a defunct settlement in Jo Daviess County
- Millville, Illinois (Adams County), a former settlement in Adams County
- Millville, Franklin County, Indiana
- Millville, Henry County, Indiana
- Millville, Iowa
- Millville, Massachusetts
- Millville, Minnesota
- Millville, Missouri
- Millville, New Jersey
- Millville, Sussex County, New Jersey
- Millville, New York
- Millville, Ohio
- Millville, Mahoning County, Ohio
- Millville, Pennsylvania
- Millville, Utah
- Millville, West Virginia
- Millville, Wisconsin, a town
  - Millville (community), Wisconsin

== Other ==
- Millville, a house brand of the grocery store chain Aldi
