= Oak Forest (disambiguation) =

An oak forest is a forest where the trees are predominantly oaks.

Oak Forest may refer to the following places:

== Settlements ==
- Oak Forest, Illinois, a suburban city in Cook County
- Oak Forest, Houston, a residential community in northwest Houston, Texas
- Oak Forest, Indiana, an unincorporated community in Franklin County
- Oak Forest, Texas, a ghost town in Gonzales County
- Oak Forest, Virginia, an unincorporated community in Cumberland County

== Other ==
- Oak Forest (Mechanicsville, Virginia), a historic home
- Oak Forest station, a railway station in Oak Forest, Illinois
- Twangste ('Oak Forest'), Old Prussian fort and settlements which became Königsberg
