= Metamora Township, Franklin County, Indiana =

Metamora Township
- Township
- Location of Metamora Township in Franklin County
- Coordinates: 39°25′43″N 85°07′53″W
- Country: United States
- State: Indiana
- County: Franklin

Government
  - Type: Indiana township

Area
  - Total: 19.63 sq mi (50.8 km^{2})
  - Land: 19.43 sq mi (50.3 km^{2})
  - Water: 0.2 sq mi (0.52 km^{2})
- Elevation: 771 ft (235 m)

Population (2020)
  - Total: 943
  - Density: 48.5/sq mi (18.7/km^{2})
- FIPS code: 18-48564
- GNIS feature ID: 453618

Metamora Township is one of thirteen townships in Franklin County, Indiana. As of the 2020 census, its population was 943, down from 974 at 2010.

Historical population
Census	Pop.	Note	%±
1890	928		—
1900	712		−23.3%
1910	693		−2.7%
1920	693		0.0%
1930	792		14.3%
1940	781		−1.4%
1950	927		18.7%
1960	979		5.6%
1970	997		1.8%
1980	977		−2.0%
1990	866		−11.4%
2000	976		12.7%
2010	974		−0.2%
2020	943		−3.2%
Source: US Decennial Census

== History ==
Metamora Township was established in 1849 from land given by Salt Creek, Laurel and Brookville townships.

The Duck Creek Aqueduct was listed on the National Register of Historic Places and designated a National Historic Landmark in 2014.

== Geography ==
According to the 2010 census, the township has a total area of 19.63 square miles (50.8 km^{2}), of which 19.43 square miles (50.3 km^{2}) (or 98.98%) is land and 0.2 square miles (0.52 km^{2}) (or 1.02%) is water.

=== Unincorporated towns ===
- Metamora
- Millville

(This list is based on USGS data and may include former settlements.)

=== Adjacent townships ===
- Blooming Grove Township (northeast)
- Brookville Township (east)
- Butler Township (south)
- Salt Creek Township (west)
- Laurel Township (northwest)

=== Major highways ===
- U.S. Route 52
- Indiana State Road 229

=== Cemeteries ===
The township contains one cemetery, McKenzie.

== Education ==
Metamora Township residents may obtain a free library card from the Franklin County Public Library District in Brookville.
