= Samuel Sidney Harrell =

American politician

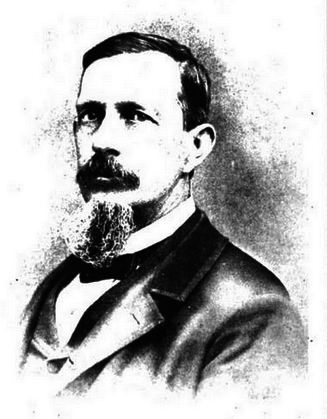
Samuel Sidney Harrell

Samuel Sidney Harrell (January 18, 1838 – April 26, 1903) was a prominent member of the Franklin County, Indiana bar. He practiced law in Brookville, Indiana from 1861 until within a few months of his death in 1903. He taught school in his earlier years, but later took up the study of law, and devoted his whole active career to this profession. He served as prosecuting attorney, clerk of the circuit court of his county and spent several years in the Indiana Legislature as a member from Franklin County.

== Early years and education ==
Samuel S. Harrell, the son of Stephen S. and Ruth (Schooley) Harrell, was born in Fairfield Township, Franklin County, Indiana, January 18, 1838, and died after an illness of many months April 26, 1903. His grandfather, Chester Harrell, was a pioneer settler of Franklin county. while his father, Stephen S. Harrell, was a successful farmer, teacher and lawyer.

Harrell was reared on his father's farm until he was 18 years of age, and received his elementary education in the district schools. He spent the winters of 1855–56 as a student in Brookville College, and in 1860, began teaching school. Desiring, however, to make the practice of law his life work, he began preparation for the bar in the office and under the direction of Daniel D. Jones, a lawyer of Brookville.

== Career ==
In 1861, Harrell was admitted to the bar and in 1862 was elected prosecuting attorney for the seventh judicial district on the Democratic ticket. After serving two years, he resumed the practice of his profession in the county seat. In 1867, he was elected clerk of the circuit court of Franklin county, and after being re-elected, he held the office for eight years. At the expiration of his second term, he again resumed his law practice. In 1885, his party nominated and elected him to the State Legislature, and he served in that law-making body for eight consecutive years. He took an active part in the Assembly and was instrumental in securing the adoption of many measures that proved of great benefit to the public. He was active in Democratic circles and uncompromising in his fidelity to Democratic principles. He served as a member of the Democratic state central committee, was chairman of the county committee, and was a frequent delegate to county and state conventions.

== Personal life ==
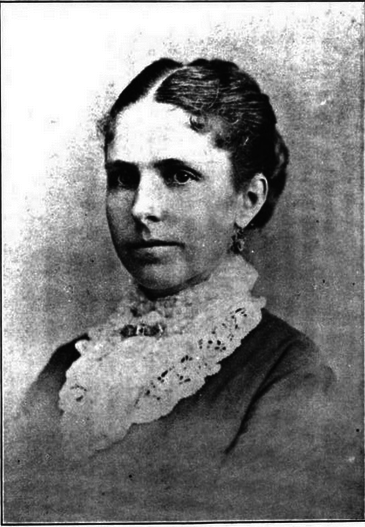
Sarah Carmichael Harrell

Harrell was married December 18, 1871 to the educator Sarah Carmichael. They had two daughters, Hallie (DePauw University alumni) and Edna.
