= Sharptown =

Sharptown may refer to:

- Sharptown, Indiana
- Sharptown, Maryland
