= Millville, Indiana =

Millville, Indiana may refer to:

- Millville, Franklin County, Indiana, an unincorporated community
- Millville, Henry County, Indiana, an unincorporated community in Liberty Township
