= Salt Creek Township, Franklin County, Indiana =

Salt Creek Township
- Township
- Location of Salt Creek Township in Franklin County
- Coordinates: 39°24′59″N 85°14′12″W
- Country: United States
- State: Indiana
- County: Franklin

Government
  - Type: Indiana township

Area
  - Total: 27.24 sq mi (70.6 km^{2})
  - Land: 27.14 sq mi (70.3 km^{2})
  - Water: 0.1 sq mi (0.26 km^{2})
- Elevation: 860 ft (262 m)

Population (2020)
  - Total: 969
  - Density: 35.7/sq mi (13.8/km^{2})
- FIPS code: 18-67554
- GNIS feature ID: 453827

Salt Creek Township is one of thirteen townships in Franklin County, Indiana. As of the 2020 census, its population was 969, down from 1,004 at 2010.

Historical population
Census	Pop.	Note	%±
1890	1,073		—
1900	849		−20.9%
1910	699		−17.7%
1920	673		−3.7%
1930	701		4.2%
1940	767		9.4%
1950	837		9.1%
1960	774		−7.5%
1970	727		−6.1%
1980	821		12.9%
1990	868		5.7%
2000	943		8.6%
2010	1,004		6.5%
2020	969		−3.5%
Source: US Decennial Census

== History ==
Salt Creek Township was established in 1844.

== Geography ==
According to the 2010 census, the township has a total area of 27.24 square miles (70.6 km^{2}), of which 27.14 square miles (70.3 km^{2}) (or 99.63%) is land and 0.1 square miles (0.26 km^{2}) (or 0.37%) is water.

=== Unincorporated towns ===
- Lake Santee (part)
- Peppertown

=== Adjacent townships ===
- Laurel Township (northeast)
- Metamora Township (east)
- Butler Township (southeast)
- Ray Township (south)
- Fugit Township, Decatur County (west)
- Posey Township (northwest)

=== Major highways ===
- Indiana State Road 229

=== Cemeteries ===
The township contains six cemeteries: Barnes, Bowman, Marlin, Saint Annes, Saint Nicholas and Stipps Hill.
