= Laurel Township =

Laurel Township may refer to the following townships in the United States:

- Laurel Township, Franklin County, Indiana
- Laurel Township, Hocking County, Ohio

== See also ==
- Mount Laurel Township, New Jersey
