= Rockdale, Indiana =

- Unincorporated community
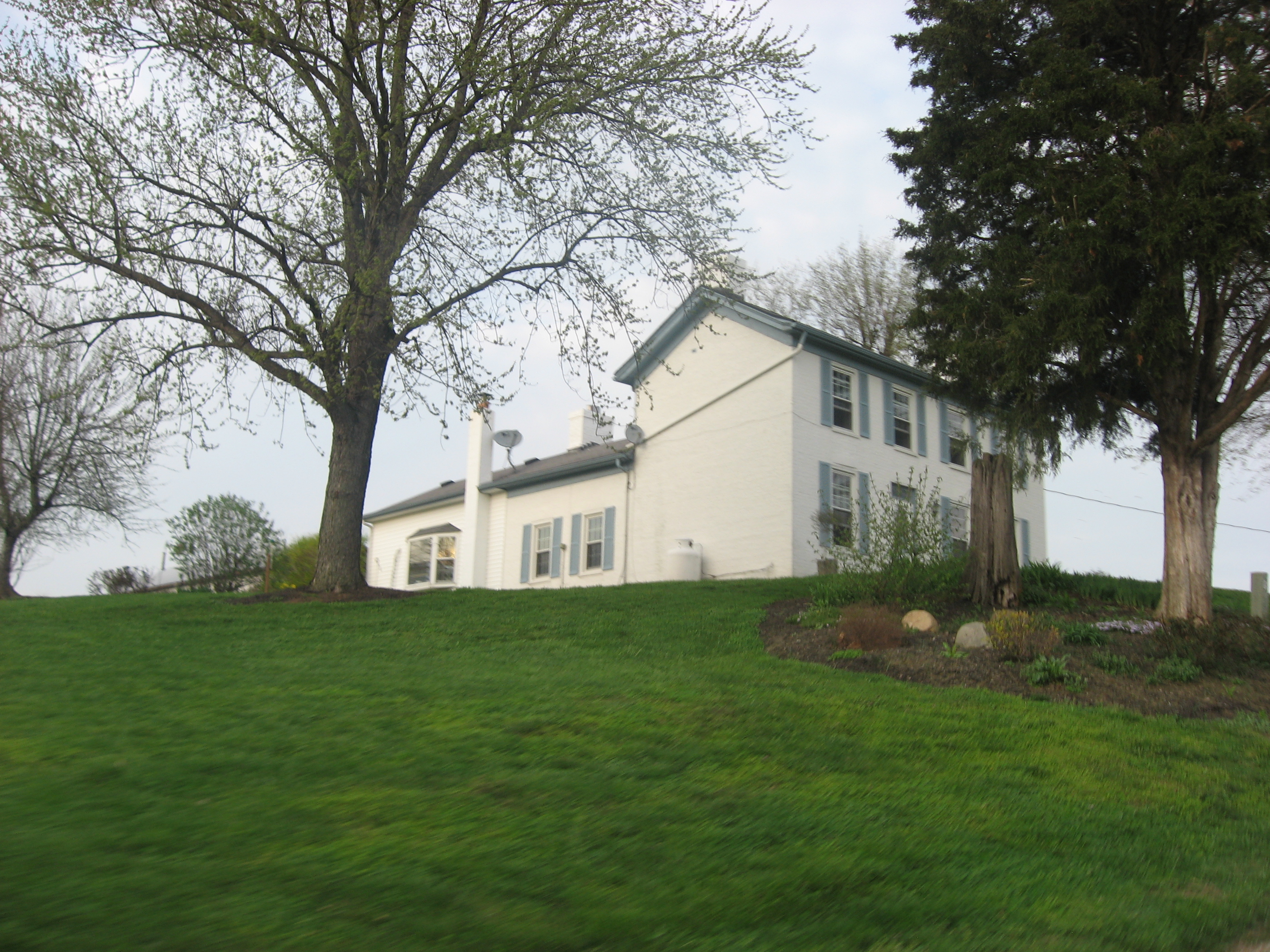
- The Salmon Turrell Farmstead in Rockdale

- Location within Indiana Location within the United States
- Coordinates: 39°19′01″N 84°50′49″W
- Country: United States
- State: Indiana
- County: Franklin
- Township: Whitewater
- Elevation: 669 ft (204 m)
- ZIP code: 47060
- FIPS code: 18-65340
- GNIS feature ID: 442216

Rockdale is an unincorporated community in Whitewater Township, Franklin County, Indiana.

== History ==
The post office Rockdale once contained originally had the name Wissel. It operated from 1886 until 1903.
