= Enochsburg, Indiana =

Unincorporated community in Indiana, U.S.

Coordinates: 39°20′03″N 85°17′51″W

Enochsburg is an unincorporated community in Whitewater Township, Franklin County, Indiana.

== History ==
Enochsburg (historically called Enochburg and Enochsburgh) was platted in 1836, and named for its founder Enoch Abrahams.

A post office was established at Enochsburg in 1837, and remained in operation until it was discontinued in 1906.
