= Butler Township, Franklin County, Indiana =

Butler Township
- Township
- Location of Butler Township in Franklin County
- Coordinates: 39°20′55″N 85°07′24″W
- Country: United States
- State: Indiana
- County: Franklin

Government
  - Type: Indiana township

Area
  - Total: 30.36 sq mi (78.6 km^{2})
  - Land: 30.28 sq mi (78.4 km^{2})
  - Water: 0.09 sq mi (0.23 km^{2})
- Elevation: 915 ft (279 m)

Population (2020)
  - Total: 1,297
  - Density: 42.83/sq mi (16.54/km^{2})
- FIPS code: 18-09568
- GNIS feature ID: 453149

Butler Township is one of thirteen townships in Franklin County, Indiana. As of the 2020 census, its population was 1,297, down from 1,318 at 2010.

Historical population
Census	Pop.	Note	%±
1890	1,243		—
1900	1,073		−13.7%
1910	876		−18.4%
1920	851		−2.9%
1930	749		−12.0%
1940	738		−1.5%
1950	826		11.9%
1960	823		−0.4%
1970	846		2.8%
1980	942		11.3%
1990	992		5.3%
2000	1,175		18.4%
2010	1,318		12.2%
2020	1,297		−1.6%
Source: US Decennial Census

== History ==
Butler Township was established in 1849. Butler Township is named after Butler County, Ohio, the native home of many of its early settlers.

== Geography ==
According to the 2010 census, the township has a total area of 30.36 square miles (78.6 km^{2}), of which 30.28 square miles (78.4 km^{2}) (or 99.74%) is land and 0.09 square miles (0.23 km^{2}) (or 0.30%) is water.

=== Unincorporated towns ===
- Oak Forest
- Saint Marys

(This list is based on USGS data and may include former settlements.)

=== Adjacent townships ===
- Metamora Township (north)
- Brookville Township (northeast)
- Highland Township (east)
- Adams Township, Ripley County (south)
- Ray Township (west)
- Salt Creek Township (northwest)

=== Cemeteries ===
The township contains one cemetery, Wolf Creek.
