= Saint Marys, Indiana =

Saint Marys, Indiana may refer to:

- Saint Marys, Franklin County, Indiana

== See also ==
- Saint Mary-of-the-Woods, Indiana
- Saint Mary's College (Indiana)
