= Indiana State Road 121 =

Highway in Indiana

State Road 121
- SR 121 highlighted in red

Route information
- Maintained by INDOT
- Length: 19.503 mi (31.387 km)

Southern segment
- Length: 15.296 mi (24.617 km)
- South end: US 52 in Metamora
- North end: SR 44 in Connersville

Northern segment
- Length: 4.207 mi (6.771 km)
- South end: US 27 / SR 227 in Richmond
- North end: SR 121 near New Paris

Location
- Country: United States
- State: Indiana
- Counties: Fayette, Franklin, Wayne

Highway system
- Indiana State Highway System; Interstate; US; State; Scenic
← SR 120	→ SR 124

State Road 121 (SR 121) is a part of the Indiana State Road that exists in two sections. The first runs between Metamora and Connersville and the second from Richmond to the Ohio state line in US state of Indiana. The 19.52 miles (31.41 km) of SR 121 that lie within Indiana serve as a minor highway. No section of the highway is listed on the National Highway System. The entire route is rural two-lane highway that passes through farmland, residential and commercial properties.

== Route description ==
No segment of State Road 121 in Indiana is included in the National Highway System (NHS). The NHS is a network of highways that are identified as being most important for the economy, mobility and defense of the nation. The highway is maintained by the Indiana Department of Transportation (INDOT) like all other state roads in the state. The department tracks the traffic volumes along all state roads as a part of its maintenance responsibilities using a metric called average annual daily traffic (AADT). This measurement is a calculation of the traffic level along a segment of roadway for any average day of the year. In 2010, INDOT figured that lowest traffic levels were 1,170 vehicles and 40 commercial vehicles used the highway daily at the Franklin–Fayette County line. The peak traffic volumes were 9,470 vehicles and 260 commercial vehicles AADT along the section of SR 121 that is concurrent with SR 227, on North J Street in Richmond.

=== Southern segment ===
The southern segment of SR 121 begins at US 52 and heads north as a rural two-lane curvy highway. The highway passes through mostly farmland and enters the town of Laurel, making a few sharp curves. The route passes through residential properties through town and makes another set of sharp curves leaving town. The highway heads northeast towards Connersville, on the way passing through farmland. The route enters Connersville from the southwest concurrent with Grand Avenue. The highway passes through residential and commercial properties, before ending at SR 44.

=== Northern segment ===
The northern segment of SR 121 begins at an intersection between US 27 and SR 227, just north of downtown Richmond. SR 121 heads east concurrent with SR 227, on North J Street. The two state roads leave J Street for Middleboro Pike and head northeast. The concurrent with SR 227 ends when SR 121 turns east onto New Paris Pike. The highway heads mostly east towards New Paris, Ohio, and crosses over Interstate 70 on the way. SR 121 ends at the Ohio state line and becomes Ohio State Route 121.

== History ==
SR 121 was commissioned in 1931 routed between Richmond and the Ohio state line. In 1932 a second segment was added to the state road system routed between US 52 and Connersville. The northern segment at the time of commissioning was a hard driving surface and the southern segment was a dirt driving surface. Between 1966 and 1967 the southern segment of SR 121 within Fayette County was paved. By 1970 the rest of SR 121, the section within Franklin County, was paved.

== Major intersections ==
County	Location	mi	km	Destinations	Notes
Franklin	Laurel Township	0.000	0.000	US 52 to SR 229 / SR 244 – Brookville, Rushville	Southern terminus of SR 121
Fayette	Connersville	15.296	24.617	SR 44 to SR 1 – Rushville, Liberty	Northern terminus of the southern section of SR 121
Gap in route
Wayne	Richmond	15.297	24.618	US 27 / SR 227 south to US 40	Southern terminus of the northern section of SR 121; Western end of SR 227 concurrency
Wayne	Richmond	15.744	25.338	SR 227 north to I-70	Eastern end of SR 227 concurrency
Wayne	Wayne Township	19.503	31.387	SR 121 north to SR 320	Northern terminus of SR 121
1.000 mi = 1.609 km; 1.000 km = 0.621 mi: Concurrency terminus
