= Palestine, Franklin County, Indiana =

Palestine, Indiana
- Unincorporated community
- Location within Indiana Location within the United States
- Coordinates: 39°25′02″N 84°55′40″W
- Country: United States
- State: Indiana
- County: Franklin
- Township: Brookville
- Elevation: 968 ft (295 m)
- ZIP code: 47012
- FIPS code: 18-57654
- GNIS feature ID: 440836

Palestine is an unincorporated town in Brookville Township, Franklin County, Indiana.

== History ==
Palestine was platted in 1849. It was named for the geographic region of Palestine.
