= Old Bath, Indiana =

- Unincorporated community
- Location within Indiana Location within the United States
- Coordinates: 39°30′30″N 84°53′30″W
- Country: United States
- State: Indiana
- County: Franklin
- Township: Bath
- Elevation: 1,034 ft (315 m)
- ZIP code: 47012
- FIPS code: 18-56268
- GNIS feature ID: 440532

Old Bath is an unincorporated community in Bath Township, Franklin County, Indiana.

== History ==
Bath was platted in 1815. It was named from Bath Township. When New Bath was founded on the railroad in 1903, Bath became Old Bath.
