= Fairfield, Franklin County, Indiana =

Fairfield, Indiana
- Unincorporated community
- Location within Indiana Location within the United States
- Coordinates: 39.50691°N 84.99524°W
- Country: United States
- State: Indiana
- County: Franklin
- Township: Fairfield
- Elevation: 780 ft (240 m)
- Time zone: Eastern Time Zone
- ZIP code: 47012

Fairfield was an unincorporated community in Fairfield Township, Franklin County, Indiana, United States. It was depopulated in the late 1960s in preparation for construction of the Brookville Lake Dam, which was completed in 1974 after several years of delay.

== Geography ==
The town was in the valley created by the East Fork of the Whitewater River, flowing southward from Union County. Its elevation was around 780 feet (238 m) above sea level. It was located at 39.50691°N 84.99524°W.
