= Youngs Corner, Indiana =

- Unincorporated community
- Location within Indiana Location within the United States
- Coordinates: 39°21′15″N 85°03′27″W
- Country: United States
- State: Indiana
- County: Franklin
- Township: Brookville
- Elevation: 978 ft (298 m)
- ZIP code: 47012
- FIPS code: 18-86174
- GNIS feature ID: 449804

Youngs Corner is an unincorporated community in Brookville Township, Franklin County, Indiana, United States.

The Yung brothers operated a distillery in Brookville Township until about 1905.
