= Raymond, Indiana =

- Unincorporated community
- Location within Indiana Location within the United States
- Coordinates: 39°28′18″N 84°50′58″W
- Country: United States
- State: Indiana
- County: Franklin
- Township: Springfield
- Elevation: 1,024 ft (312 m)
- ZIP code: 47010
- FIPS code: 18-63180
- GNIS feature ID: 441800

Raymond is an unincorporated community in Springfield Township, Franklin County, Indiana.

== History ==
Raymond was platted in 1903, when the railroad was extended to that point. The town site was previously wetland.
