= Mixersville, Indiana =

- Unincorporated community
- Location within Indiana Location within the United States
- Coordinates: 39°29′18″N 84°49′30″W
- Country: United States
- State: Indiana
- County: Franklin
- Township: Bath
- Elevation: 1,001 ft (305 m)
- ZIP code: 47010
- FIPS code: 18-50004
- GNIS feature ID: 439301

Mixersville is an unincorporated community in Bath Township, Franklin County, Indiana.

== History ==
Mixersville was platted in 1846 by William Mixer, and named for him. A post office was established at Mixersville in 1851, and remained in operation until it was discontinued in 1903.
