= Stavetown, Indiana =

- Unincorporated community
- Location within Indiana Location within the United States
- Coordinates: 39°24′39″N 85°00′36″W
- Country: United States
- State: Indiana
- County: Franklin
- Township: Brookville
- Elevation: 627 ft (191 m)
- ZIP code: 47012
- FIPS code: 18-72818
- GNIS feature ID: 444102

Stavetown is an unincorporated community in Brookville Township, Franklin County, Indiana.

== History ==
Stavetown received its name from a stave factory once located there. The stave factory was destroyed in the Great Flood of 1913 and was not rebuilt.
