= Fairfield Township, Franklin County, Indiana =

Fairfield Township
- Township
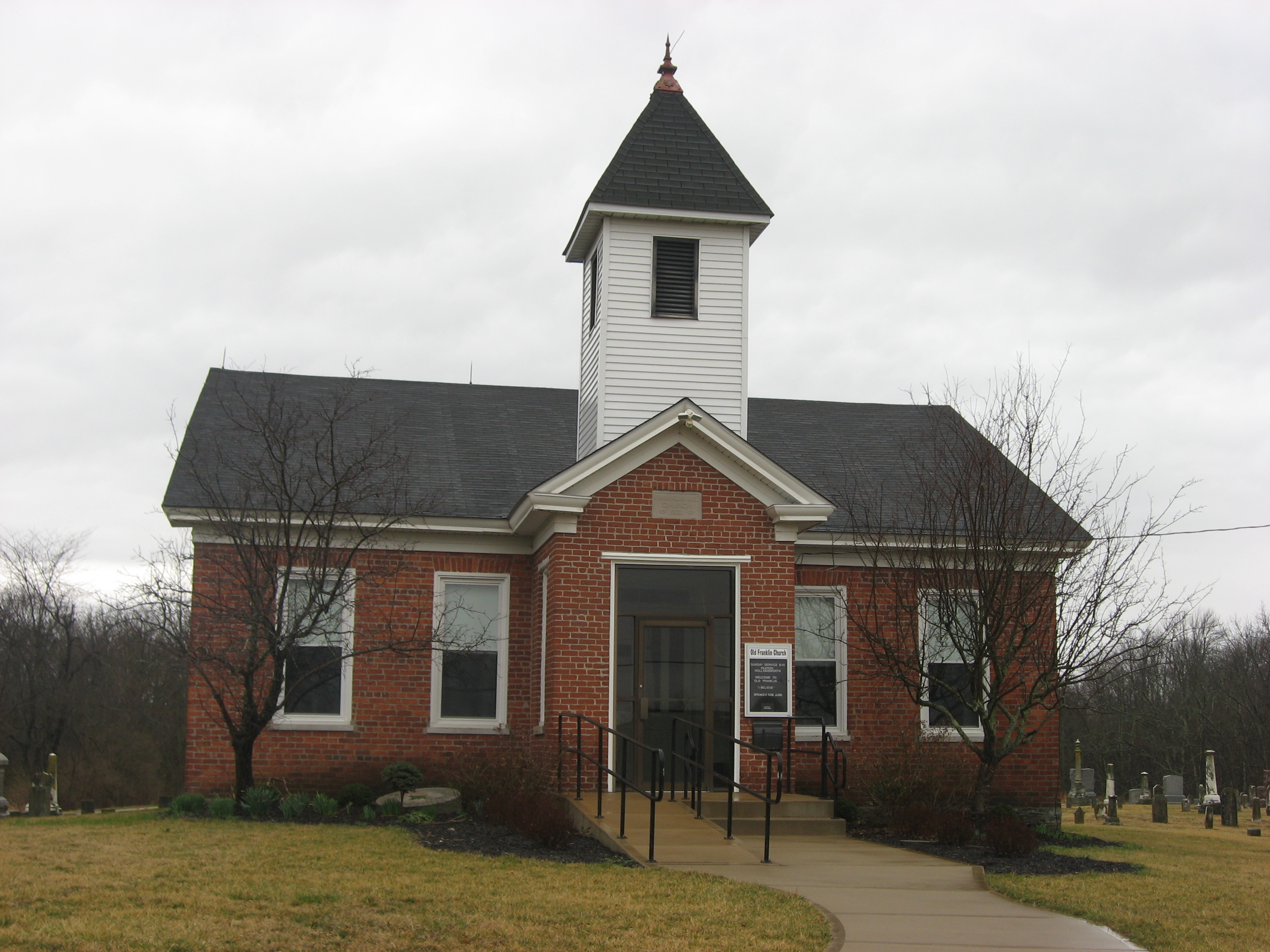
- Old Franklin United Brethren Church, a historic site in the township

- Location of Fairfield Township in Franklin County
- Coordinates: 39°30′17″N 84°58′20″W
- Country: United States
- State: Indiana
- County: Franklin

Government
  - Type: Indiana township

Area
  - Total: 15.79 sq mi (40.9 km^{2})
  - Land: 13.31 sq mi (34.5 km^{2})
  - Water: 2.49 sq mi (6.4 km^{2})
- Elevation: 981 ft (299 m)

Population (2020)
  - Total: 473
  - Density: 35.5/sq mi (13.7/km^{2})
- FIPS code: 18-22306
- GNIS feature ID: 453285

Fairfield Township is one of thirteen townships in Franklin County, Indiana. As of the 2020 census, its population was 473, down from 537 at 2010.

Historical population
Census	Pop.	Note	%±
1890	674		—
1900	601		−10.8%
1910	553		−8.0%
1920	519		−6.1%
1930	508		−2.1%
1940	525		3.3%
1950	558		6.3%
1960	569		2.0%
1970	139		−75.6%
1980	236		69.8%
1990	276		16.9%
2000	473		71.4%
2010	537		13.5%
2020	473		−11.9%
Source: US Decennial Census

== Geography ==
According to the 2010 census, the township has a total area of 15.79 square miles (40.9 km^{2}), of which 13.31 square miles (34.5 km^{2}) (or 84.29%) is land and 2.49 square miles (6.4 km^{2}) (or 15.77%) is water.

== History ==
Fairfield Township was established in 1821. Fairfield is a descriptive name referring to the beauty of the countryside.

The Old Franklin United Brethren Church was listed on the National Register of Historic Places in 1995.

=== Unincorporated towns ===
- Fairfield

The original town was founded in 1815. It was incorporated as a town in 1876. The village, on the East Fork of the Whitewater River, was known for its buggy-making operations in the late 1800s.

Notable natives included author James Maurice Thompson, who wrote "Alice of Old Vincennes." Women's suffrage pioneer Ida Husted Harper was born in Fairfield.

The town was inundated by a federal reservoir project in the late 1960s.

- New Fairfield

New Fairfield was founded in the early 1970s after construction began on a federal reservoir project in the valley of the East Fork of the Whitewater River.

The town exists on land once owned by Carl Huber and Herschel Klein.

It contains no commerce or government agencies.

(This list is based on USGS data and may include former settlements.)

=== Adjacent townships ===
- Harmony Township, Union County (north)
- Union Township, Union County (northeast)
- Bath Township (east)
- Brookville Township (south)
- Blooming Grove Township (west)

=== Major highways ===
- Indiana State Road 101

== Education ==
Fairfield Township residents may obtain a free library card from the Franklin County Public Library District in Brookville.

== Notable people ==
- Samuel Sidney Harrell (1838–1903), member of the Franklin County bar, served as prosecuting attorney, clerk of the circuit court of his county, spent several years in the Indiana Legislature
