= Indiana State Road 229 =

State highway in Indiana, United States

State Road 229
- SR 229 highlighted in red

Route information
- Maintained by INDOT
- Length: 24.808 mi (39.925 km)
- Existed: 1931–present

Major junctions
- South end: US 421 at Napoleon
- I-74 in Batesville
- North end: US 52 at Metamora

Location
- Country: United States
- State: Indiana
- Counties: Franklin, Ripley

Highway system
- Indiana State Highway System; Interstate; US; State; Scenic
← SR 227	→ US 231

State Road 229 (SR 229) is a State Road in the south-eastern section of the state of Indiana. Running for about 25 miles (40 km) in a general north–south direction, connecting rural portions of Ripley and Franklin counties. SR 229 was originally introduced in the early 1930 routed between Batesville and U.S. Route 52 (US 52) as part of SR 1. That section SR 1 became SR 229 a year later. In the late 1960s the road was paved.

== Route description ==
The southern terminus of SR 229 is in downtown Napoleon, at the corner of Madison Street (US 421) and Main Street. SR 229 leads east from the intersection before turning southeast to head out of town. The road turns north-northeast at an T-intersection with the western end of SR 48. The highway heads towards Batesville as a rural curvy two-lane highway, passing through a mix of farmland and woodland. On the way to Batesville the road passes through the unincorporated community of Ballstown.

SR 229 enters Batesville passing through Brums Woods, before turning due north onto Mulberry Street. SR 229 crosses a Central Railroad of Indiana tack, before curving onto Main Street. Main Street heads northeast entering downtown Batesville. SR 229 leaves Main Street and follows Boehringer Street northwest for one block, before turning northeast onto Walnut Street. Walnut Street leaves downtown by passing the Batesville Public Library. Northeast of downtown the state road passes through an intersection with SR 46. After SR 46, the road enters a commercial district and has an interchange with Interstate 74 (I–74). SR 229 continues through the commercial district until the road curves toward the north and leaves Batesville.

North of Batesville the road passes many house before entering Oldenburg following Sycamore Street. SR 229 turns east onto Main Street passing through the historic district of Oldenburg. After the historical area SR 229 turns due north and Main Street ends. The highway continues north and leaves town. After Oldenburg SR 229 turns towards the east for a short distance, before curving back towards the north. The road passes through the unincorporated community of Peppertown. North of Peppertown SR 229 becomes curvy, some of which are very sharp. SR 229 ends at a T-intersection with US 52 in rural Franklin County, just west of the Whitewater River and the census-designated place of Metamora.

No part of SR 229 is included as a part of the National Highway System (NHS). The NHS is a network of highways that are identified as being most important for the economy, mobility and defense of the nation. The highest traffic count is between SR 46 and I–74, where 24,559 vehicles travel the highway on average each day. The lowest traffic count is immediately north of SR 48, where 423 vehicles travel the highway on average each day.

== History ==
In 1930, the Indiana State Highway Commission designated SR 1 along the modern routing of SR 229, between Batesville and US 52. SR 229 had its beginning in 1931 when it was designated from Napoleon to US 52, replacing SR 1 from Batesville to US 52. An interchange with I-74 was opened between 1963 and 1964. The entire roadway was paved between 1966 and 1967.

== Major intersections ==
County	Location	mi	km	Destinations	Notes
Ripley	Napoleon	0.000	0.000	US 421 – Osgood, Greensburg	Southern terminus of SR 229
Ripley	Delaware Township	2.938	4.728	SR 48 east – Lawrenceburg	Western terminus of the eastern section of SR 48
Ripley	Batesville	12.274	19.753	SR 46 to SR 129 – Greensburg	
Ripley	Batesville	12.379– 12.512	19.922– 20.136	I-74 – Indianapolis, Cincinnati	Exit number 149 on I-74
Franklin	Metamora Township	24.808	39.925	US 52 to SR 121 – Rushville, Metamora, Brookville	Northern terminus of SR 229
1.000 mi = 1.609 km; 1.000 km = 0.621 mi
