= Mound Haven, Indiana =

- Unincorporated community
- Location within Indiana Location within the United States
- Coordinates: 39°23′02″N 84°58′42″W
- Country: United States
- State: Indiana
- County: Franklin
- Township: Brookville
- Elevation: 663 ft (202 m)
- ZIP code: 47012
- FIPS code: 18-51275
- GNIS feature ID: 439513

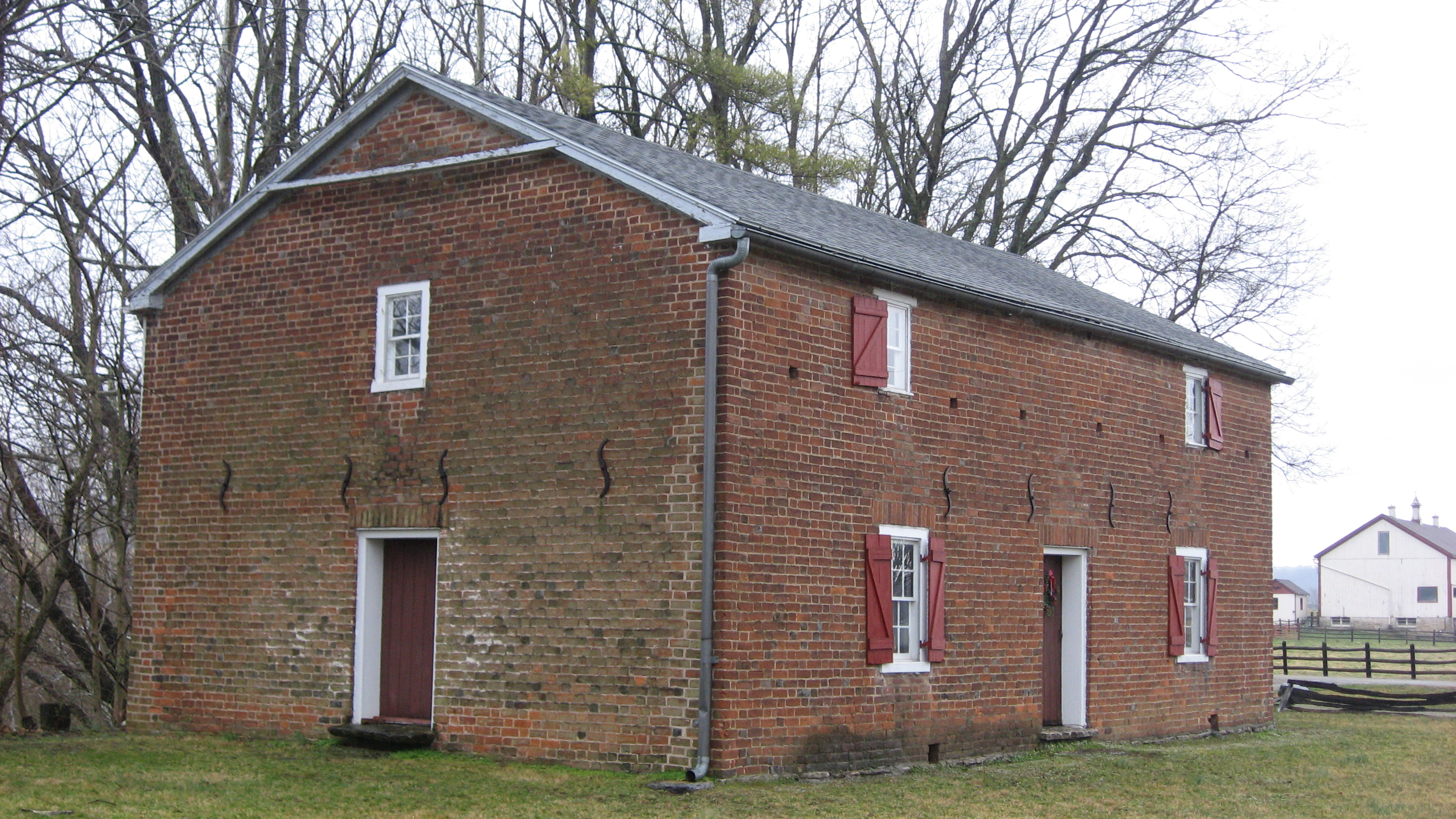
Front and western end of the former Little Cedar Grove Baptist Church, located along U.S. Route 52 at its junction with Little Cedar Road, southeast of Brookville in Brookville Township, Franklin County, Indiana, United States. Built in 1812, it is the oldest church anywhere in Indiana still on its original location, and it is listed on the National Register of Historic Places.

Mound Haven is an unincorporated community in Brookville Township, Franklin County, Indiana. The historic Little Cedar Grove Baptist Church is located in Mound Haven.
