= Mount Auburn, Franklin County, Indiana =

Unincorporated community in Indiana, U.S.

Coordinates: 39°30′27″N 85°11′39″W

Mount Auburn is an unincorporated community in Franklin County, Indiana, in the United States.

== History ==
Mount Auburn was platted in 1850. It is located at latitude 39.508 and longitude -85.194. Mount Auburn's elevation is 906 feet above mean sea level.
