= Drewersburg, Indiana =

- Unincorporated community
- Location within Indiana Location within the United States
- Coordinates: 39°20′25″N 84°50′14″W
- Country: United States
- State: Indiana
- County: Franklin
- Township: Whitewater
- Elevation: 922 ft (281 m)
- ZIP code: 47060
- FIPS code: 18-18676
- GNIS feature ID: 433687

Drewersburg is an unincorporated community in Whitewater Township, Franklin County, Indiana.

== History ==
Drewersburg, originally called Edinburg, was platted in 1833. It was later named for William S. Drewer, who already lived in Drewersburg at the time of platting.

A post office was established as Drewersburg in 1837, and remained in operation until it was discontinued in 1903.
