= New Fairfield, Indiana =

- Unincorporated community
- Location within Indiana Location within the United States
- Coordinates: 39°30′25″N 84°58′21″W
- Country: United States
- State: Indiana
- County: Franklin
- Township: Fairfield
- Elevation: 981 ft (299 m)
- ZIP code: 47012
- FIPS code: 18-52884
- GNIS feature ID: 440045

New Fairfield is an unincorporated community in Fairfield Township, Franklin County, Indiana.

== History ==
"Old" Fairfield was platted in 1815. New Fairfield was started on higher ground in the 1970s when impounding of the Brookville Reservoir destroyed the former village of Old Fairfield.
