= Whitcomb, Indiana =

- Unincorporated community
- Location within Indiana Location within the United States
- Coordinates: 39°26′54″N 84°56′13″W
- Country: United States
- State: Indiana
- County: Franklin
- Township: Brookville
- Elevation: 994 ft (303 m)
- ZIP code: 47012
- FIPS code: 18-83726
- GNIS feature ID: 445916

Whitcomb is an unincorporated community in Brookville Township, Franklin County, Indiana.

== History ==
Whitcomb was originally called Union, and under the latter name was platted in 1816 by Ebenezer Howe. A post office was established at Whitcomb in 1846, and remained in operation until it was discontinued in 1906.
