= Lake Santee, Indiana =

- Census-designated place
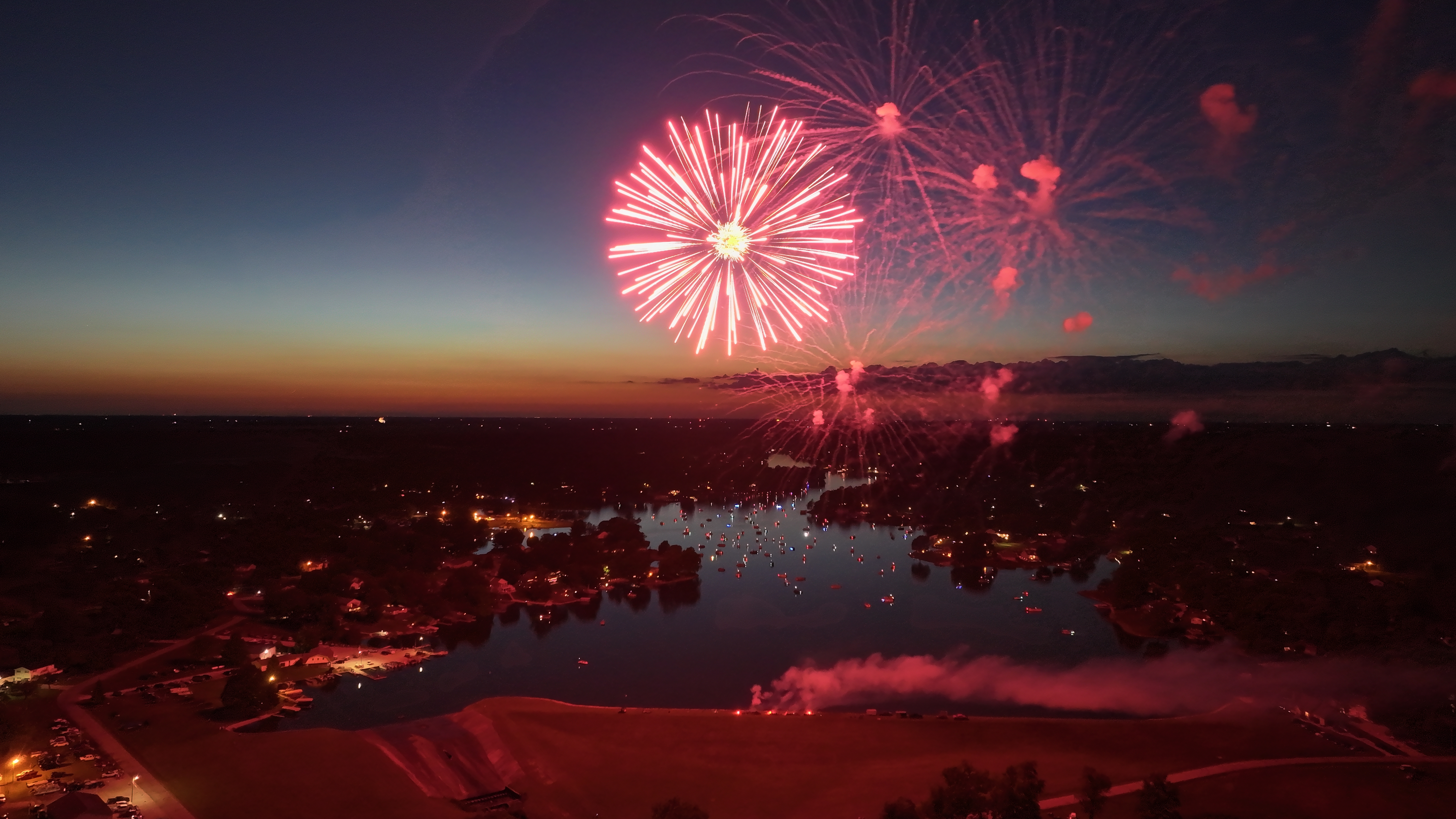
- Lake Santee's 2024 Fireworks Display

- Flag

- Location of Lake Santee in Decatur County and Franklin County, Indiana.

- Location within Indiana
- Coordinates: 39°24′28″N 85°18′24″W
- Country: United States
- State: Indiana
- County: Decatur, Franklin
- Township: Fugit, Salt Creek

Area
  - Total: 2.82 sq mi (7.30 km^{2})
  - Land: 2.46 sq mi (6.38 km^{2})
  - Water: 0.36 sq mi (0.92 km^{2})
- Elevation: 994 ft (303 m)

Population (2020)
  - Total: 889
  - Density: 360.9/sq mi (139.34/km^{2})
- ZIP code: 47240
- FIPS code: 18-41444
- GNIS feature ID: 2587021

Lake Santee is an unincorporated town and census-designated place in Decatur and Franklin counties, Indiana, United States. As of the 2020 census, Lake Santee had a population of 889.

== History ==
Lake Santee was built up in the 1960s as a housing development centered on a reservoir of the same name.

== Geography ==
Lake Santee is located in southeastern Indiana. It is situated 13 miles (21 km) northeast of Greensburg and 12 miles (19 km) northwest of Batesville.

According to the U.S. Census Bureau, the CDP has a total area of 2.8 square miles (7.3 km^{2}), of which 2.5 square miles (6.4 km^{2}) is land and 0.35 square miles (0.9 km^{2})

, or 12.60%, is water. The water area consists entirely of Lake Santee, the reservoir.

== Demographics ==
Historical population
Census	Pop.	Note	%±
2020	889		—
U.S. Decennial Census

== Education ==
The portion in Decatur County is in the Decatur County Community Schools school district.

The portion in Franklin County is almost entirely in Batesville Community School Corporation, with a small piece in Franklin County Community School Corporation.

== Fauna ==
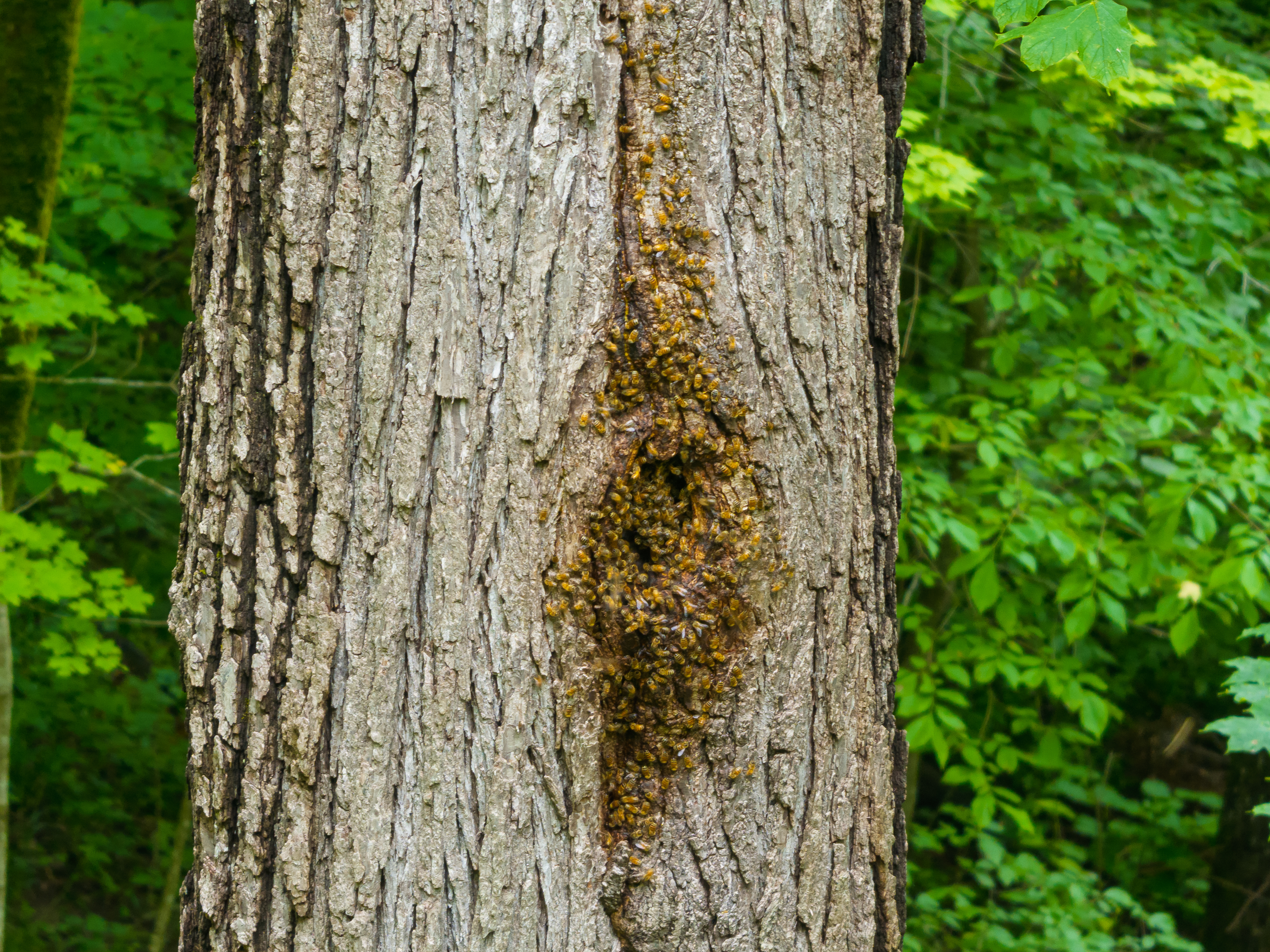
A honey bee colony in Lake Santee

Lake Santee and the surrounding woodlands, wetlands, and agricultural areas support a diverse assemblage of wildlife typical of southeastern Indiana. Common mammals include white-tailed deer, eastern cottontail rabbits, raccoons, Virginia opossums, red foxes, coyotes, gray squirrels, fox squirrels, beavers, and muskrats. River otters have also expanded throughout much of southern Indiana in recent decades.

The lake and its shoreline provide habitat for numerous bird species. Frequently observed waterbirds include great blue herons, belted kingfishers, Canada geese, mallards, wood ducks, and double-crested cormorants. Birds of prey commonly seen in the area include red-tailed hawks, red-shouldered hawks, barred owls, and bald eagles. Osprey are occasionally observed during migration and have been supported locally through nesting platform projects.

Reptiles and amphibians found in the region include eastern box turtles, common snapping turtles, painted turtles, northern watersnakes, gray treefrogs, American toads, spring peepers, and bullfrogs. The lake supports a variety of fish species, including largemouth bass, bluegill, crappie, catfish, and sunfish. The forests surrounding Lake Santee are part of the Eastern Broadleaf Forest ecosystem and support numerous songbirds, butterflies, pollinating insects, and other native wildlife throughout the year.
