= Peoria, Franklin County, Indiana =

Peoria, Indiana
- Unincorporated community
- Location within Indiana Location within the United States
- Coordinates: 39°26′00″N 84°49′02″W
- Country: United States
- State: Indiana
- County: Franklin
- Township: Springfield
- Elevation: 1,001 ft (305 m)
- ZIP code: 47012
- FIPS code: 18-58842
- GNIS feature ID: 441010

Peoria is an unincorporated community in Springfield Township, Franklin County, Indiana.

== History ==
Peoria was named after the Peoria tribe. A post office was established at Peoria in 1850, and remained in operation until it was discontinued in 1907.

Peoria once had the Ingleside Institute academy and a normal school.

== Geography ==
Peoria is located on the state line.
