= Springfield Township, Franklin County, Indiana =

Springfield Township
- Township
- Location of Springfield Township in Franklin County
- Coordinates: 39°25′44″N 84°52′15″W
- Country: United States
- State: Indiana
- County: Franklin

Government
  - Type: Indiana township

Area
  - Total: 35.62 sq mi (92.3 km^{2})
  - Land: 35.57 sq mi (92.1 km^{2})
  - Water: 0.06 sq mi (0.16 km^{2})
- Elevation: 1,007 ft (307 m)

Population (2020)
  - Total: 1,120
  - Density: 31.5/sq mi (12.2/km^{2})
- FIPS code: 18-72134
- GNIS feature ID: 453865

Springfield Township is one of thirteen townships in Franklin County, Indiana. As of the 2020 census, its population was 1,120, slightly down from 1,156 at 2010.

Historical population
Census	Pop.	Note	%±
1890	1,224		—
1900	1,130		−7.7%
1910	1,118		−1.1%
1920	1,050		−6.1%
1930	1,052		0.2%
1940	979		−6.9%
1950	951		−2.9%
1960	932		−2.0%
1970	877		−5.9%
1980	952		8.6%
1990	1,078		13.2%
2000	1,178		9.3%
2010	1,156		−1.9%
2020	1,120		−3.1%
Source: US Decennial Census

== History ==
Springfield Township was established in 1817. The origin of the name is unclear. Some hold it was named for a large spring where a blockhouse was to be built, while others believe it was named for a town in the East where the first settlers originated.

The Joseph Shafer Farm was listed on the National Register of Historic Places in 1982.

== Geography ==
According to the 2010 census, the township has a total area of 35.62 square miles (92.3 km^{2}), of which 35.57 square miles (92.1 km^{2}) (or 99.86%) is land and 0.06 square miles (0.16 km^{2}) (or 0.17%) is water.

=== Cities and towns ===
- Mount Carmel

=== Unincorporated towns ===
- Palestine
- Peoria
- Raymond
- Scipio

(This list is based on USGS data and may include former settlements.)

=== Major highways ===
- Indiana State Road 252

=== Cemeteries ===
The township contains five cemeteries: Asbury, Big Cedar Grove, Conn, James, Mount Carmel and Springfield.
