= Joseph Shafer Farm =

- U.S. National Register of Historic Places
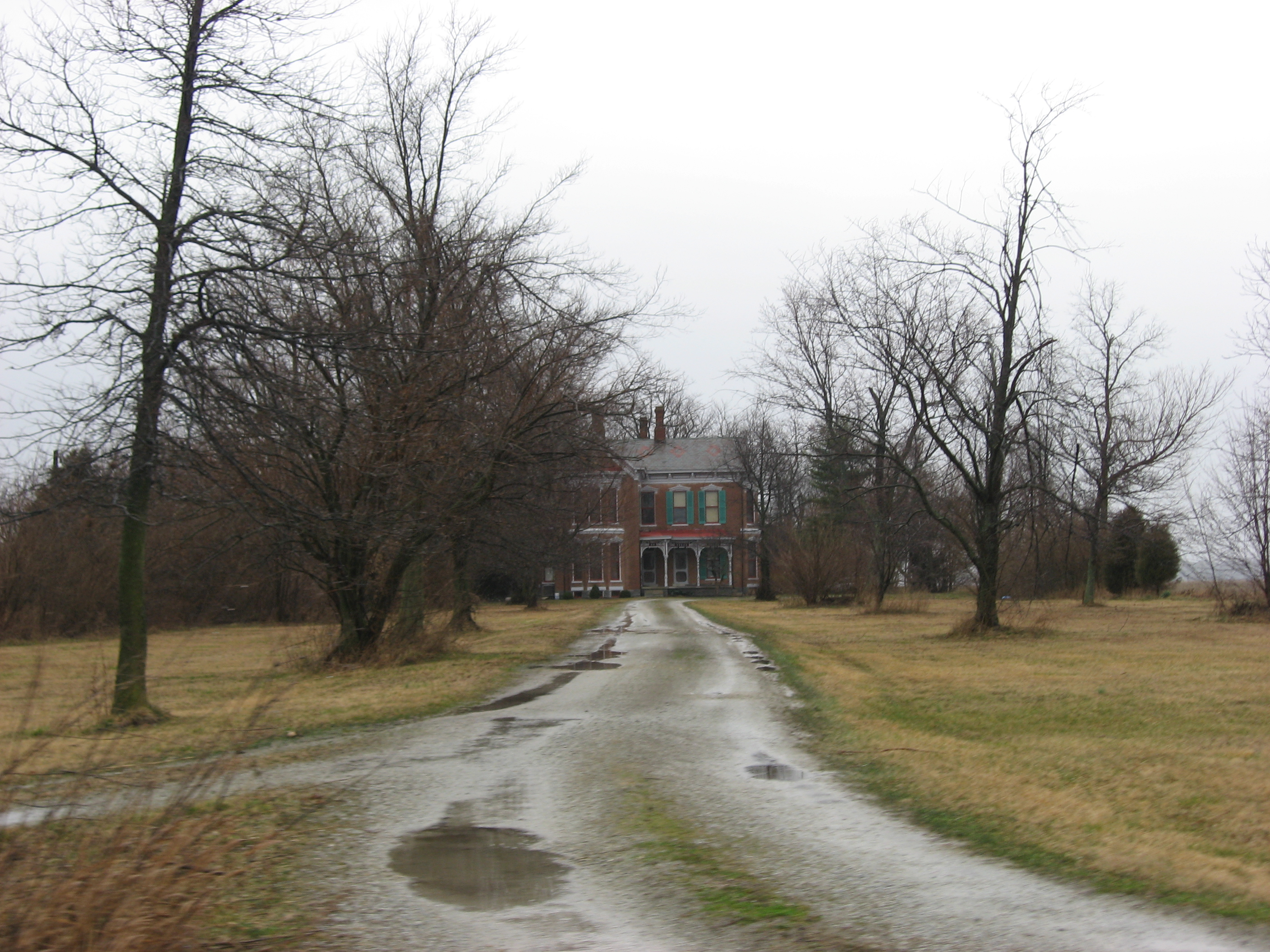
- Joseph Shafer Farmhouse, March 2012

- Location within Indiana Location within the United States
- Location: Northeast of Brookville on Flinn Road, Springfield Township, Franklin County, Indiana
- Coordinates: 39°28′26″N 84°52′46″W
- Area: 6 acres (2.4 ha)
- Built: 1883
- Architectural style: Italianate
- NRHP reference No.: 82000038
- Added to NRHP: August 26, 1982

Joseph Shafer Farm, also known as Shady Lawn Farm and Maple Lawn Farm, is a historic home and farm located in Springfield Township, Franklin County, Indiana. The house was built in 1883, and is a two-story, Italianate style brick dwelling. It has a slate roof and features a pair of two-story, three-window, projecting bays. Also on the property are two contributing barns (c. 1883), privy, smithy, henhouse, garage, granary, and well house.

It was listed on the National Register of Historic Places in 1982.
