= Bath, Indiana =

- Unincorporated community
- Location within Indiana Location within the United States
- Coordinates: 39°30′30″N 84°51′45″W
- Country: United States
- State: Indiana
- County: Franklin
- Township: Bath
- Elevation: 1,014 ft (309 m)
- ZIP code: 47010
- FIPS code: 18-03682
- GNIS feature ID: 430574

Bath is an unincorporated community in Bath Township, Franklin County, Indiana.

== History ==
Bath, also called New Bath to differentiate itself from Old Bath, was laid out in 1903 when the railroad was extended to that point.
