= Indiana State Road 227 =

Highway in Indiana

State Road 227
- SR 227 highlighted in red

Route information
- Maintained by INDOT
- Length: 37.400 mi (60.189 km)
- Existed: 1931–present

Major junctions
- South end: SR 177 near Kitchel
- US 27 in Richmond; US 40 in Richmond; I-70 / US 35 near Richmond; US 36 near Lynn
- North end: SR 32 at Union City

Location
- Country: United States
- State: Indiana
- Counties: Randolph, Union, Wayne

Highway system
- Indiana State Highway System; Interstate; US; State; Scenic
← SR 225	→ SR 229

State Road 227 is a north–south highway at the eastern edge of the U.S. state of Indiana. It is nearly parallel with the Ohio state line.

== Route description ==
State Road 227 begins in northeastern Union County at the point where Ohio State Route 177 meets the Ohio/Indiana border. It runs north through Richmond with an interchange with Interstate 70 at Exit 153, and continues to State Road 32 near Union City.

== History ==
The Indiana State Highway Commission proposed SR 227 initially as part of the state road system by August 1930. This section of highway ran from Richmond to SR 28 (now SR 32) roughly along the modern routing. By September 30, 1930, the highway official became part of the state road system. SR 227 was extended south to the Ohio state line in late 1950 or early 1951, replacing SR 21.

== Major intersections ==
{{INint

County	Location	mi	km	Destinations	Notes
Union	Harrison Township	0.000	0.000	SR 177 south – Hamilton	Southern terminus of SR 227 at the Ohio border
Wayne	Boston	4.977	8.010	Old SR 122	
Wayne	Richmond	10.007	16.105	US 27 south – Liberty	Southern end of US 27 concurrency
Wayne	Richmond	11.732– 11.963	18.881– 19.253	US 40	
Wayne	Richmond	12.657	20.369	US 27 north – Fort Wayne	Northern end of US 27 concurrency;
Wayne	Richmond	13.104	21.089	SR 121 north – New Paris	121 Southern terminus
Wayne	Richmond	15.097– 15.269	24.296– 24.573	I-70 / US 35 – Indianapolis, Columbus	Exit number 153 on I-70
county=Randolph	cspan=2	location=Greensfork Township	ctdab=Randolph	mile=28.347	road= US 36 – Indianapolis, Greenville
Wayne Township	37.400	60.189	SR 32 – Winchester, Union City	Northern terminus of SR 227	
1.000 mi = 1.609 km; 1.000 km = 0.621 mi: Concurrency terminus
