= Huntersville, Indiana =

Unincorporated community in Indiana, US

Coordinates: 39°18′13″N 85°13′59″W

Huntersville is an unincorporated community in Franklin County, Indiana, in the United States.

== History ==
Huntersville was laid out in 1841. Hunter was likely the name of one of its founders.
