= Franklin County, Indiana =

County in Indiana, United States

- County
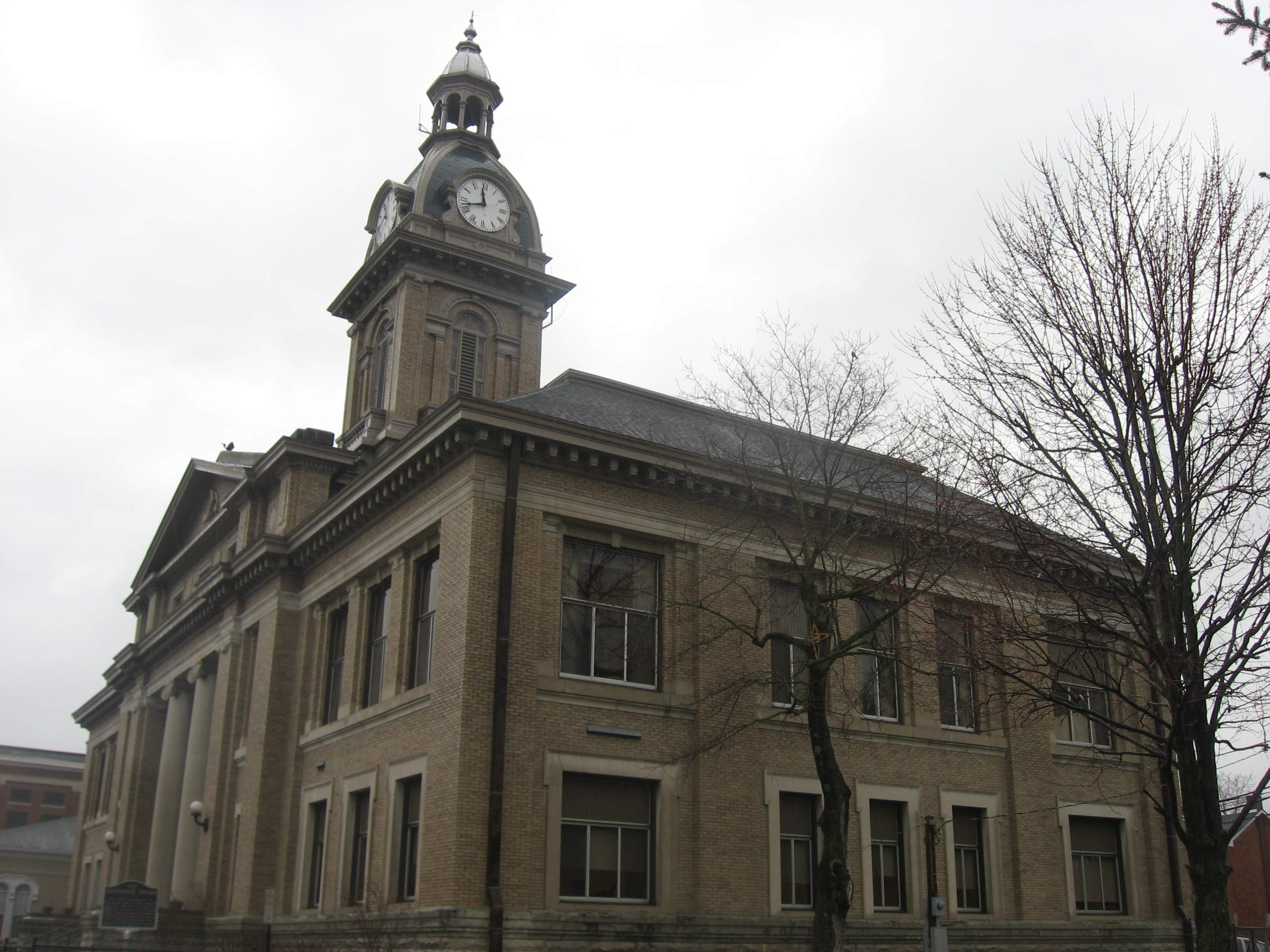
- Franklin County Courthouse in Brookville Historic District

- Seal

- Location within the U.S. state of Indiana
- Coordinates: 39°25′N 85°04′W
- Country: United States
- State: Indiana
- Founded: February 1, 1811 (authorized)
- Named for: Benjamin Franklin
- Seat: Brookville
- Largest town: Brookville (entirely within county); Batesville (partial)

Area
  - Total: 391.05 sq mi (1,012.8 km^{2})
  - Land: 384.43 sq mi (995.7 km^{2})
  - Water: 6.62 sq mi (17.1 km^{2}) 1.69%

Population (2020)
  - Total: 22,785
  - Estimate (2025): 23,286 ▲
  - Density: 59.1/sq mi (22.8/km^{2})
- Time zone: UTC−5 (Eastern)
  - Summer (DST): UTC−4 (EDT)
- Congressional district: 6th
- Website: www.franklincountyin.com
- Indiana county number 24

Franklin County is a county on the eastern border of the U.S. state of Indiana. In the 2020 United States census, the county population was 22,785. The county seat is the town of Brookville. Franklin County is part of the Cincinnati, OH–KY–IN Metropolitan Statistical Area. The only incorporated city in Franklin County is Batesville, which lies mostly in adjoining Ripley County.

== Geography ==
Franklin County lies on the eastern edge of Indiana; its eastern border abuts the western border of Ohio. Its low rolling hills, once completely wooded, have been partially cleared and leveled for agricultural use. The carved drainages are still largely brush-filled. According to the 2010 census, the county has a total area of 391.05 square miles (1,012.8 km^{2}), of which 384.43 square miles (995.7 km^{2}) (or 98.31%) is land and 6.62 square miles (17.1 km^{2}) (or 1.69%) is water.

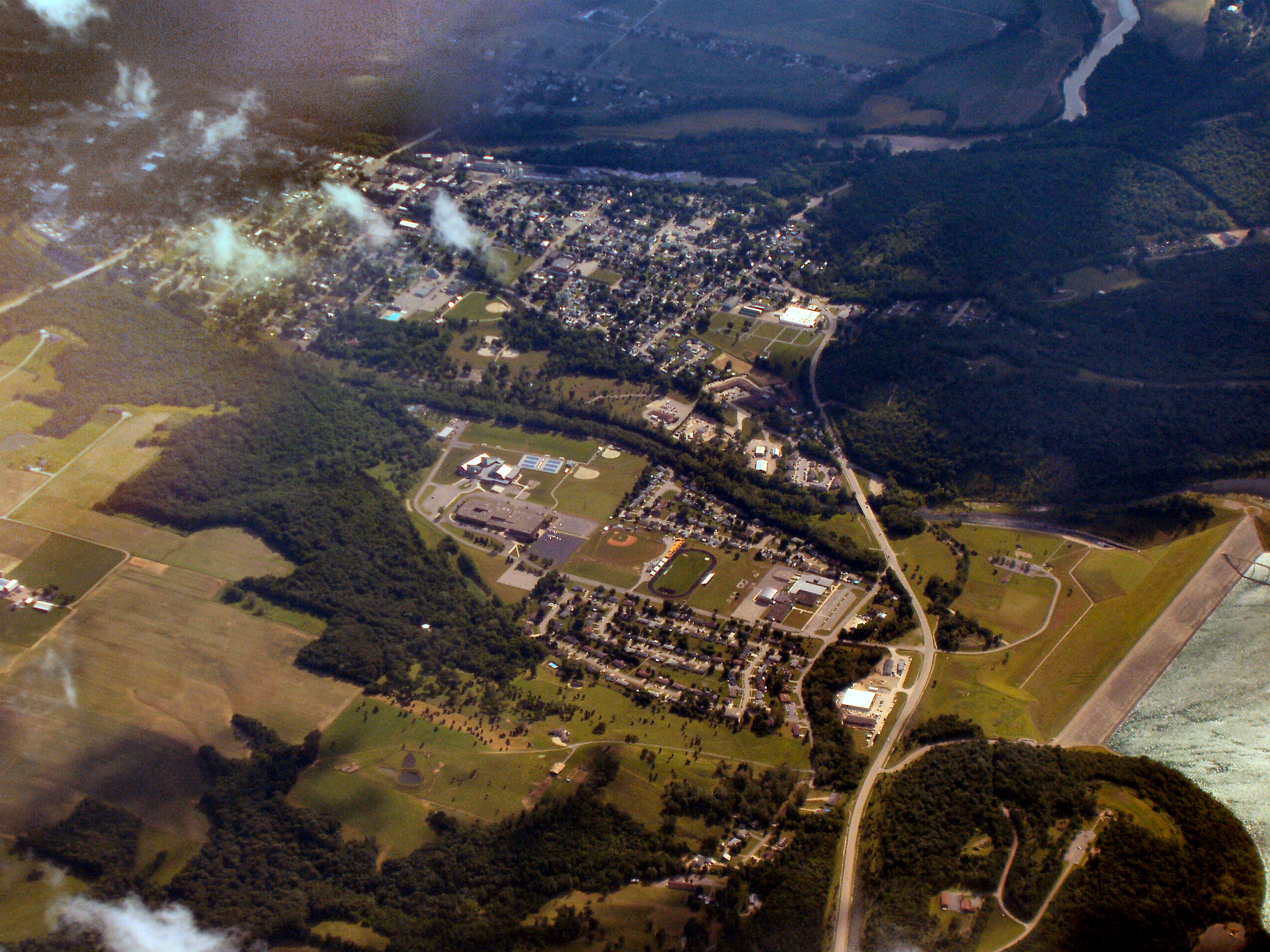
Brookville from the northeast

Brookville Lake extends into the county's northern part, formed by a dam of the same name on the East Branch of the Whitewater River, a tributary of the Great Miami River. The West Branch of the Whitewater River enters the county's northwestern part from Fayette County and joins the east branch at Brookville, to form the Whitewater River, flowing southeastward into Dearborn County. The southern and southwestern parts of Franklin County are drained by Salt Creek, Pipe Creek, and Blue Creek, which flow northeastward into Whitewater River. The highest point in the county (1,070 feet/330 meters ASL) is a small hill 1.0 mile (1.6 km) north of Andersonville.

=== Adjacent counties ===
- Fayette County - north
- Union County - northeast
- Butler County, Ohio - east
- Hamilton County, Ohio - southeast
- Dearborn County - south
- Ripley County - southwest
- Decatur County - west
- Rush County - northwest

=== Major highways ===
- Interstate 74
- U.S. Route 52
- Indiana State Road 1
- Indiana State Road 46
- Indiana State Road 101
- Indiana State Road 121
- Indiana State Road 229
- Indiana State Road 244
- Indiana State Road 252

=== Protected areas ===
- Mounds State Recreation Area

=== Lakes ===
- Brookville Lake (part)

== Communities ==
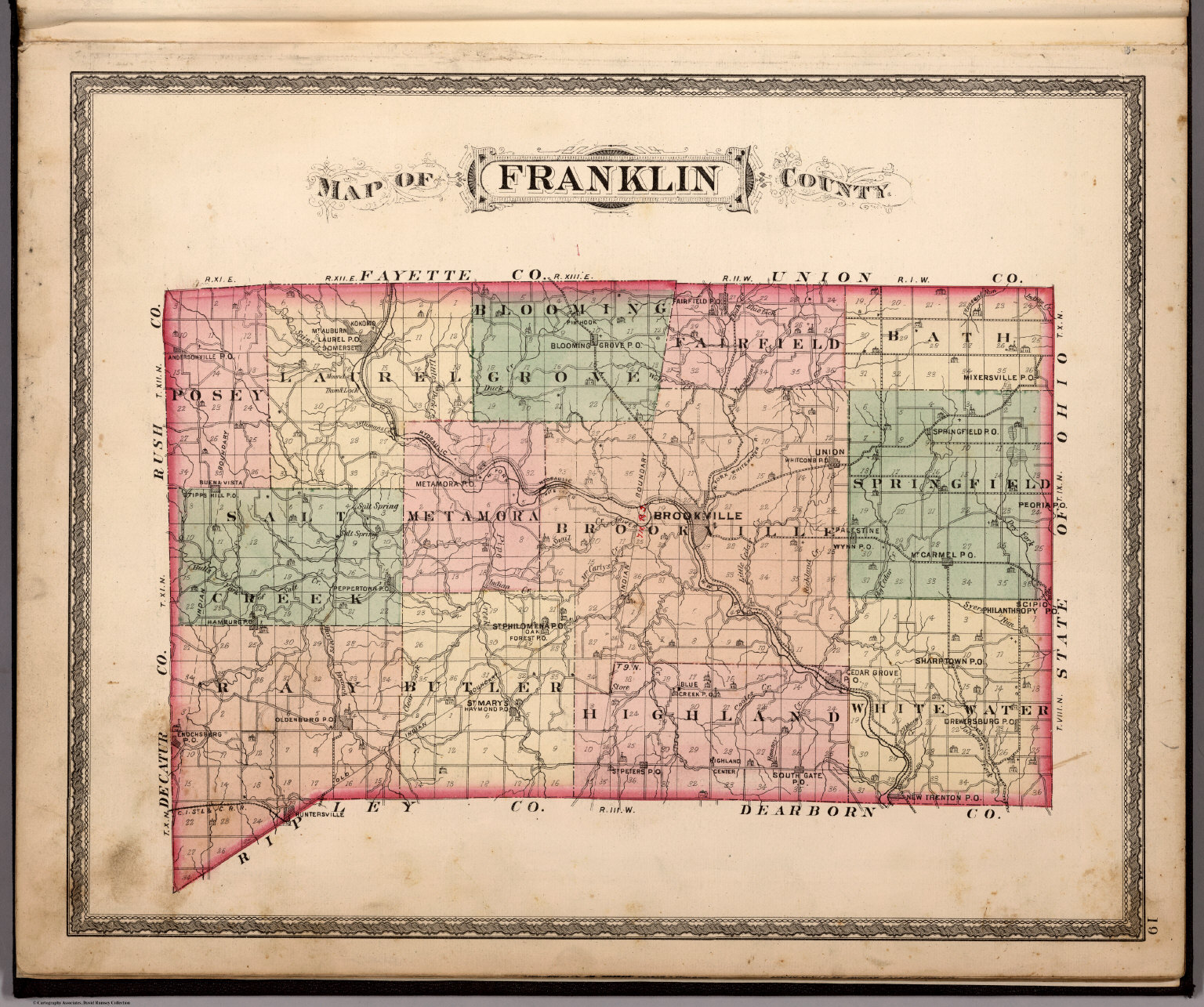
1876 map of Franklin County divided into townships

=== City ===
- Batesville (northern part)

=== Towns ===
- Brookville (county seat)
- Cedar Grove
- Laurel
- Mount Carmel
- Oldenburg
- West Harrison (partial)

=== Census-designated places ===
- Lake Santee (partial)
- Metamora
- New Trenton

=== Unincorporated communities ===
- Andersonville
- Bath
- Blooming Grove
- Buena Vista
- Drewersburg
- Enochsburg
- Fairfield (extinct)
- Hamburg
- Highland Center
- Huntersville
- Klemmes Corner
- Lake View
- Millville
- Mixersville
- Mound Haven
- Mount Auburn
- New Fairfield
- Oak Forest
- Old Bath
- Palestine
- Peoria
- Peppertown
- Raymond
- Rockdale
- Saint Marys
- Saint Peter
- Scipio (part)
- Sharptown
- South Gate
- Stavetown
- Whitcomb
- Yellow Bank
- Youngs Corner

=== Townships ===
- Bath Township
- Blooming Grove Township
- Brookville Township
- Butler Township
- Fairfield Township
- Highland Township
- Laurel Township
- Metamora Township
- Posey Township
- Ray Township
- Salt Creek Township
- Springfield Township
- Whitewater Township

== History ==
The future state of Indiana was first regulated by congressional passage of the Northwest Ordinance in 1787. In 1790 the Territory was divided into two counties, with Knox covering much of present-day Indiana. In 1810, a portion of Knox was partitioned to create Wayne County, and shortly thereafter a portion further south was partitioned to create Franklin; the authorizing act was dated February 1, 1811. It was named for statesman Benjamin Franklin.

Some early settlers of Franklin County were Primitive Baptists who came with Elder William Tyner from Virginia in 1797, after the American Revolutionary War. They organized the first church congregation in the Whitewater Valley, the Little Cedar Grove Baptist Church. They raised a log chapel southeast of Brookville in 1805.

Another European-American landmark is the Big Cedar Baptist Church and Burying Ground on Big Cedar Creek Road, between the road to Reily and the Oxford Pike. The original church was established in 1817, as an arm of the Little Cedar Baptist church. The brick building was built in 1838. This church congregation, similar to many pioneer Baptist groups in the country, was originally Primitive Baptist or Hardshell. In the 1830s modernism reached the county, bringing innovations such as Sunday schools, Missionary Societies, and the playing of organs. Organs were particularly anathema to the Primitive Party, who considered it akin to Aaron's golden calf.

The Big Cedar congregation divided into two over these issues, but the two groups arrived at an amicable settlement. Both congregations continued to use the same building: the Primitives, or Hardshells, had worship in the church on the first and third Sabbath of each month, and the Modernists or Missionary Baptists used the church on the second and fourth Sundays. Each congregation had a wood shed. The building is now maintained in connection with the Big Cedar Cemetery Association.

Governors James B. Ray, Noah Noble and David Wallace were known as the "Brookville Triumvirate." They had each lived in Brookville and were elected to consecutive terms as Indiana governor. Noble and Ray were political adversaries.

James B. Goudie Jr. (1769–1836), Speaker of the Indiana House, was also from Franklin County.

== Climate and weather ==
Brookville, Indiana

Climate chart (precipitation, max. and min. temperature)
J	F	M	A	M	J	J	A	S	O	N	D
3 36 17	2.7 42 20	3.8 53 29	4 64 38	4.9 74 48	4.1 83 58	4.3 87 62	3.9 85 60	2.7 79 52	3 67 40	3.7 53 32	3.3 41 23
- █ Average max. and min. temperatures in °F
- █ Precipitation totals in inches
- Source: The Weather Channel
Metric conversion
J	F	M	A	M	J	J	A	S	O	N	D
76 2 −8	68 6 −7	97 12 −2	101 18 3	124 23 9	104 28 14	108 31 17	99 29 16	68 26 11	77 19 4	93 12 0	84 5 −5
- █ Average max. and min. temperatures in °C
- █ Precipitation totals in mm

In recent years, average temperatures in Brookville have ranged from a low of 17 °F (−8 °C) in January to a high of 87 °F (31 °C) in July, although a record low of −31 °F (−35 °C) was recorded in January 1994 and a record high of 104 °F (40 °C) was recorded in September 1951. Average monthly precipitation ranged from 2.68 inches (68 mm) in September to 4.90 inches (124 mm) in May.

== Government ==
The county government is a constitutional body, and is granted specific powers by the Constitution of Indiana, and by the Indiana Code.

County Council: The legislative branch of the county government; controls spending and revenue collection in the county. Representatives are elected to four-year terms from county districts. They set salaries, the annual budget, and special spending. The council has limited authority to impose local taxes, in the form of an income and property tax that is subject to state level approval, excise taxes, and service taxes.

Board of Commissioners: The executive body of the county; commissioners are elected county-wide to staggered four-year terms. One commissioner serves as president. The commissioners execute acts legislated by the council, collect revenue, and manage county government.

County Officials: The county has other elected offices, including sheriff, coroner, auditor, treasurer, recorder, surveyor, and circuit court clerk. These officers are elected to four-year terms. Members elected to county government positions are required to declare party affiliations and to be residents of the county.

Franklin County is part of Indiana's 6th congressional district; Indiana Senate districts 42 and 43; and Indiana House of Representatives districts 55, 67 and 68.

== Politics ==
Franklin County is a Republican stronghold, and increasingly so in recent presidential elections. The 2012 election and every subsequent one broke the record for the strongest Republican support ever in county history. In 2024, it was the most Republican county in the state of Indiana.

United States presidential election results for Franklin County, Indiana
Year	Republican		Democratic		Third party(ies)	
Year	No.	%	No.	%	No.	%
1888	1,712	37.05%	2,872	62.15%	37	0.80%
1892	1,610	35.47%	2,859	62.99%	70	1.54%
1896	1,760	38.07%	2,844	61.52%	19	0.41%
1900	1,738	38.10%	2,781	60.96%	43	0.94%
1904	1,757	40.36%	2,501	57.45%	95	2.18%
1908	1,670	38.23%	2,616	59.89%	82	1.88%
1912	929	23.37%	2,306	58.00%	741	18.64%
1916	1,495	37.24%	2,426	60.42%	94	2.34%
1920	3,137	45.51%	3,671	53.26%	85	1.23%
1924	3,296	44.43%	3,915	52.78%	207	2.79%
1928	3,426	47.19%	3,817	52.58%	17	0.23%
1932	2,687	36.02%	4,704	63.06%	68	0.91%
1936	2,952	41.21%	3,891	54.31%	321	4.48%
1940	4,381	58.11%	3,142	41.68%	16	0.21%
1944	3,796	59.82%	2,530	39.87%	20	0.32%
1948	3,566	55.13%	2,860	44.22%	42	0.65%
1952	4,630	64.04%	2,548	35.24%	52	0.72%
1956	4,429	63.02%	2,573	36.61%	26	0.37%
1960	4,108	53.73%	3,523	46.08%	14	0.18%
1964	2,956	42.26%	4,021	57.48%	18	0.26%
1968	3,468	52.28%	2,386	35.97%	780	11.76%
1972	4,324	66.74%	2,131	32.89%	24	0.37%
1976	3,557	51.96%	3,234	47.25%	54	0.79%
1980	4,551	59.10%	2,834	36.80%	316	4.10%
1984	5,202	69.62%	2,225	29.78%	45	0.60%
1988	4,777	65.70%	2,472	34.00%	22	0.30%
1992	3,831	46.91%	2,456	30.07%	1,880	23.02%
1996	4,167	52.25%	2,808	35.21%	1,000	12.54%
2000	5,587	67.00%	2,591	31.07%	161	1.93%
2004	6,977	69.83%	2,925	29.27%	90	0.90%
2008	7,018	65.95%	3,404	31.99%	220	2.07%
2012	7,424	70.17%	2,909	27.50%	247	2.33%
2016	8,669	78.12%	1,969	17.74%	459	4.14%
2020	9,691	80.64%	2,137	17.78%	190	1.58%
2024	9,810	81.52%	2,061	17.13%	163	1.35%

== Demographics ==
Historical population
Census	Pop.	Note	%±
1820	10,763		—
1830	10,190		−5.3%
1840	13,349		31.0%
1850	17,968		34.6%
1860	19,549		8.8%
1870	20,223		3.4%
1880	20,092		−0.6%
1890	18,366		−8.6%
1900	16,388		−10.8%
1910	15,335		−6.4%
1920	14,806		−3.4%
1930	14,498		−2.1%
1940	14,412		−0.6%
1950	16,034		11.3%
1960	17,015		6.1%
1970	16,943		−0.4%
1980	19,612		15.8%
1990	19,580		−0.2%
2000	22,151		13.1%
2010	23,087		4.2%
2020	22,785		−1.3%
2025 (est.)	23,286	▲	2.2%
US Decennial Census; 1790–1960 1900–1990; 1990–2000 2010–2013

=== Racial and ethnic composition ===
Franklin County, Indiana – Racial and ethnic composition Note: the US Census treats Hispanic/Latino as an ethnic category. This table excludes Latinos from the racial categories and assigns them to a separate category. Hispanics/Latinos may be of any race.
Race / Ethnicity (NH = Non-Hispanic)	Pop 1980	Pop 1990	Pop 2000	Pop 2010	Pop 2020	% 1980	% 1990	% 2000	% 2010	% 2020
White alone (NH)	19,470	19,460	24,092	24,796	24,769	99.28%	99.39%	98.11%	96.33%	93.57%
Black or African American alone (NH)	2	10	12	76	90	0.01%	0.05%	0.05%	0.30%	0.34%
Native American or Alaska Native alone (NH)	13	31	24	36	35	0.07%	0.16%	0.10%	0.14%	0.13%
Asian alone (NH)	19	27	177	178	154	0.10%	0.14%	0.72%	0.69%	0.58%
Native Hawaiian or Pacific Islander alone (NH)	x	x	3	7	8	x	x	0.01%	0.03%	0.03%
Other race alone (NH)	0	0	2	25	39	0.00%	0.00%	0.01%	0.10%	0.15%
Mixed race or Multiracial (NH)	x	x	113	196	763	x	x	0.46%	0.76%	2.88%
Hispanic or Latino (any race)	108	52	132	426	614	0.55%	0.27%	0.54%	1.66%	2.32%
Total	19,612	19,580	24,555	25,740	26,472	100.00%	100.00%	100.00%	100.00%	100.00%

=== 2020 census ===
As of the 2020 census, the county had a population of 22,785. The median age was 42.9 years. 23.5% of residents were under the age of 18 and 19.1% of residents were 65 years of age or older. For every 100 females there were 100.4 males, and for every 100 females age 18 and over there were 100.2 males age 18 and over.

The racial makeup of the county was 95.8% White, 0.1% Black or African American, 0.2% American Indian and Alaska Native, 0.4% Asian, <0.1% Native Hawaiian and Pacific Islander, 0.4% from some other race, and 3.1% from two or more races. Hispanic or Latino residents of any race comprised 1.0% of the population.

11.1% of residents lived in urban areas, while 88.9% lived in rural areas.

There were 8,693 households in the county, of which 31.2% had children under the age of 18 living in them. Of all households, 59.2% were married-couple households, 16.3% were households with a male householder and no spouse or partner present, and 18.3% were households with a female householder and no spouse or partner present. About 22.4% of all households were made up of individuals and 11.0% had someone living alone who was 65 years of age or older.

There were 9,639 housing units, of which 9.8% were vacant. Among occupied housing units, 80.8% were owner-occupied and 19.2% were renter-occupied. The homeowner vacancy rate was 1.2% and the rental vacancy rate was 7.2%.

=== 2010 Census ===
As of the 2010 United States census, there were 23,087 people, 8,579 households, and 6,447 families in the county. The population density was 60.1 inhabitants per square mile (23.2/km^{2}). There were 9,538 housing units at an average density of 24.8 per square mile (9.6/km^{2}). The racial makeup of the county was 98.3% white, 0.2% black or African American, 0.2% Asian, 0.1% American Indian, 0.3% from other races, and 0.8% from two or more races. Those of Hispanic or Latino origin made up 0.9% of the population. In terms of ancestry, 40.3% were German, 14.7% were American, 13.1% were Irish, and 9.5% were English.

Of the 8,579 households, 35.9% had children under the age of 18 living with them, 61.6% were married couples living together, 8.4% had a female householder with no husband present, 24.9% were non-families, and 20.5% of all households were made up of individuals. The average household size was 2.67 and the average family size was 3.07. The median age was 40.0 years.

The median income for a household in the county was $47,697 and the median income for a family was $60,300. Males had a median income of $43,443 versus $32,612 for females. The per capita income for the county was $23,090. About 8.6% of families and 11.7% of the population were below the poverty line, including 16.8% of those under age 18 and 10.9% of those age 65 or over.

== Education ==
School districts include:

- Batesville Community School Corporation
- Franklin County Community School Corporation
- Union County-College Corner Joint School District

== See also ==
- National Register of Historic Places listings in Franklin County, Indiana
