= Laurel Township, Franklin County, Indiana =

Laurel Township
- Township
- Location of Laurel Township in Franklin County
- Coordinates: 39°29′03″N 85°11′28″W
- Country: United States
- State: Indiana
- County: Franklin

Government
  - Type: Indiana township

Area
  - Total: 31.74 sq mi (82.2 km^{2})
  - Land: 31.5 sq mi (82 km^{2})
  - Water: 0.23 sq mi (0.60 km^{2})
- Elevation: 709 ft (216 m)

Population (2020)
  - Total: 1,400
  - Density: 44/sq mi (17/km^{2})
- FIPS code: 18-42390
- GNIS feature ID: 453544

Laurel Township is one of thirteen townships in Franklin County, Indiana. As of the 2020 census, its population was 1,400, down from 1,634 at 2010.

Historical population
Census	Pop.	Note	%±
1890	1,760		—
1900	1,412		−19.8%
1910	1,209		−14.4%
1920	1,294		7.0%
1930	1,285		−0.7%
1940	1,284		−0.1%
1950	1,662		29.4%
1960	1,625		−2.2%
1970	1,509		−7.1%
1980	1,739		15.2%
1990	1,462		−15.9%
2000	1,650		12.9%
2010	1,634		−1.0%
2020	1,400		−14.3%
Source: US Decennial Census

== History ==
Laurel Township was established in 1845.

== Geography ==
According to the 2010 census, the township has a total area of 31.74 square miles (82.2 km^{2}), of which 31.5 square miles (82 km^{2}) (or 99.24%) is land and 0.23 square miles (0.60 km^{2}) (or 0.72%) is water. Triple Lakes is in this township.

=== Cities and towns ===
- Laurel

=== Adjacent townships ===
- Columbia Township, Fayette County (north)
- Jackson Township, Fayette County (northeast)
- Blooming Grove Township (east)
- Metamora Township (southeast)
- Salt Creek Township (southwest)
- Posey Township (west)
- Orange Township, Fayette County (northwest)

=== Major highways ===
- U.S. Route 52
- Indiana State Road 121

=== Cemeteries ===
The township contains three cemeteries: Gobel, Jenks and North.

== Education ==
Laurel Township residents may obtain a free library card from the Franklin County Public Library District in Brookville.
