= Yellow Bank, Indiana =

Unincorporated community in Indiana, U.S.

Coordinates: 39°26′15″N 85°04′09″W

Yellow Bank is an unincorporated community in Franklin County, Indiana, in the United States.

== History ==
Yellow Bank took its name from the Yellow Bank Creek upon which it is situated. A mill was built at the mouth of Yellow Bank Creek as early as 1812.
