= Salmon Turrell Farmstead =

- U.S. National Register of Historic Places
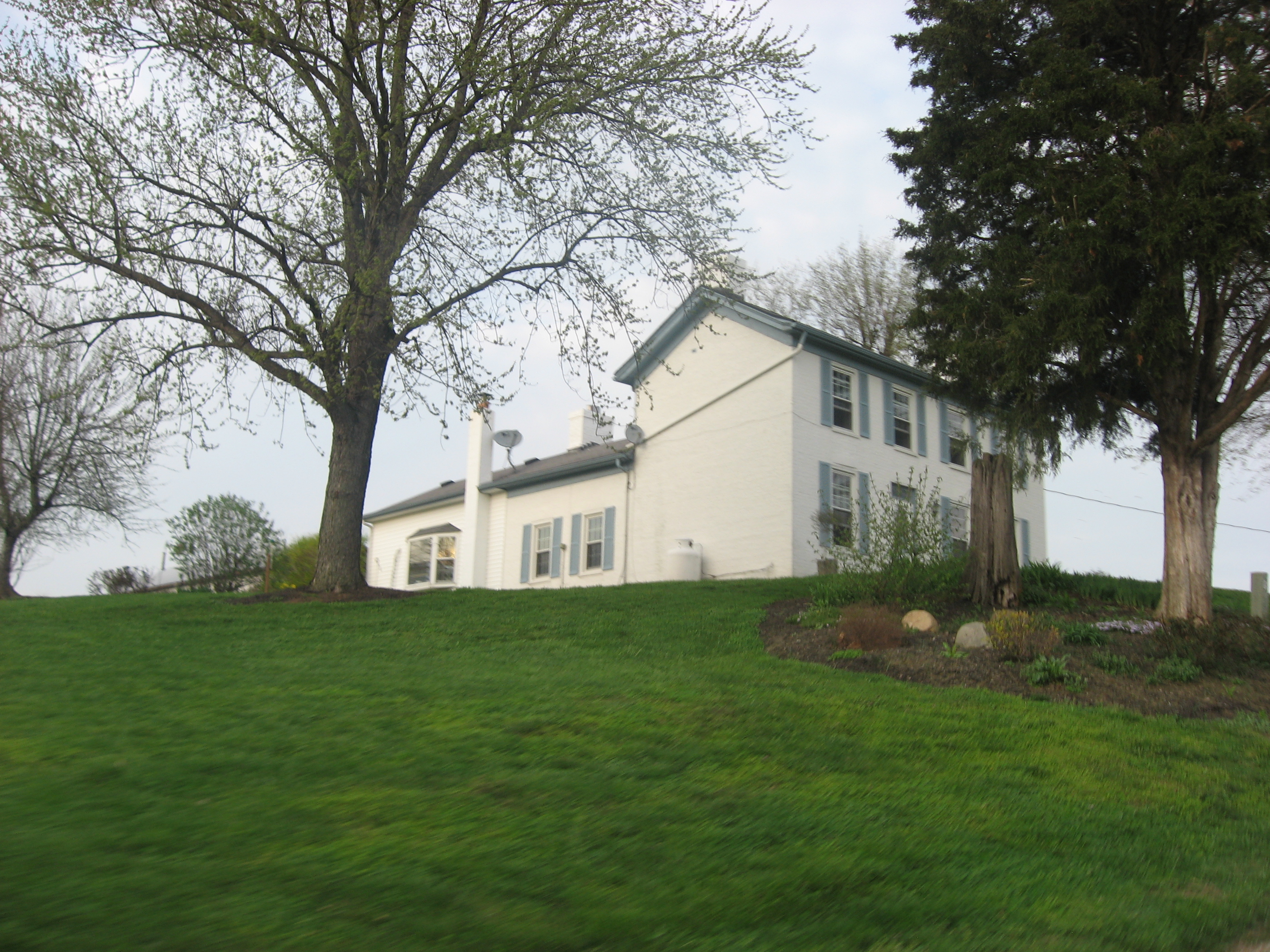
- Salmon Turrell Farmhouse, March 2012

- Location within Indiana Location within the United States
- Location: 3051 Snow Hill Rd., northwest of West Harrison, Whitewater Township, Franklin County, Indiana
- Coordinates: 39°19′40″N 84°51′37″W
- Area: 2 acres (0.81 ha)
- Built by: Snow, Lemuel
- Architectural style: Federal, I-House
- NRHP reference No.: 09000423
- Added to NRHP: June 17, 2009

Salmon Turrell Farmstead is a historic home and farm located in Whitewater Township, Franklin County, Indiana. The house was built about 1830, and is a two-story, four-bay, Federal style brick I-house. It has a 1 1/2-story brick ell. Also on the property is a contributing bank barn built about 1830. A series of additions have been made to the barn starting about 1845.

It was listed on the National Register of Historic Places in 2009.
