= Sharptown, Indiana =

- Unincorporated community
- Location within Indiana Location within the United States
- Coordinates: 39°22′01″N 84°52′25″W
- Country: United States
- State: Indiana
- County: Franklin
- Township: Whitewater
- Elevation: 1,007 ft (307 m)
- ZIP code: 47060
- FIPS code: 18-69066
- GNIS feature ID: 443314

Sharptown is an unincorporated community in Whitewater Township, Franklin County, Indiana.

== History ==
The community (historically known as Sharpstown) was based around a post office on the Mt. Carmel and Johnson Fork Turnpike, now known as Johnson Fork Road. The post office at Sharptown operated from 1878 until 1906.
