= Millville, Mahoning County, Ohio =

Millville, Ohio
- Unincorporated community
- Location within Ohio Location within the United States
- Coordinates: 40°54′21″N 80°48′23″W
- Country: United States
- State: Ohio
- Counties: Mahoning
- Township: Green
- Elevation: 1,033 ft (315 m)
- Time zone: UTC-5 (Eastern (EST))
  - Summer (DST): UTC-4 (EDT)
- ZIP Code: 44460 (Salem)
- GNIS feature ID: 1048979

Millville is an unincorporated community in Green Township, Mahoning County, Ohio, in the U.S. state of Ohio.
