= Oak Forest, Virginia =

Unincorporated community in Virginia, United States

Coordinates: 37.53654°N 78.19389°W

Oak Forest is an unincorporated community in Cumberland County, in the U.S. state of Virginia.
