= Oak Forest, Indiana =

Unincorporated community in Indiana, U.S.

Coordinates: 39°23′05″N 85°05′07″W

Oak Forest is an unincorporated community in Butler Township, Franklin County, Indiana.

== History ==
A post office was established at Oak Forest in 1848, and remained in operation until it was discontinued in 1907.

In 1844, St. Philomena Catholic Church was founded in Oak Forest. It is currently run as the Oratory of Sts. Philomena and Cecilia by the Priestly Fraternity of St. Peter using the 1962 missal.

In 1915, Oak Forest had a general store, two blacksmith shops, and a saloon.

The Oak Forest General Store operated until approximately the year 2000. It has a new owner and is reopening in late 2015 or 2016.
