= Peppertown, Indiana =

- Unincorporated community and Census-designated place
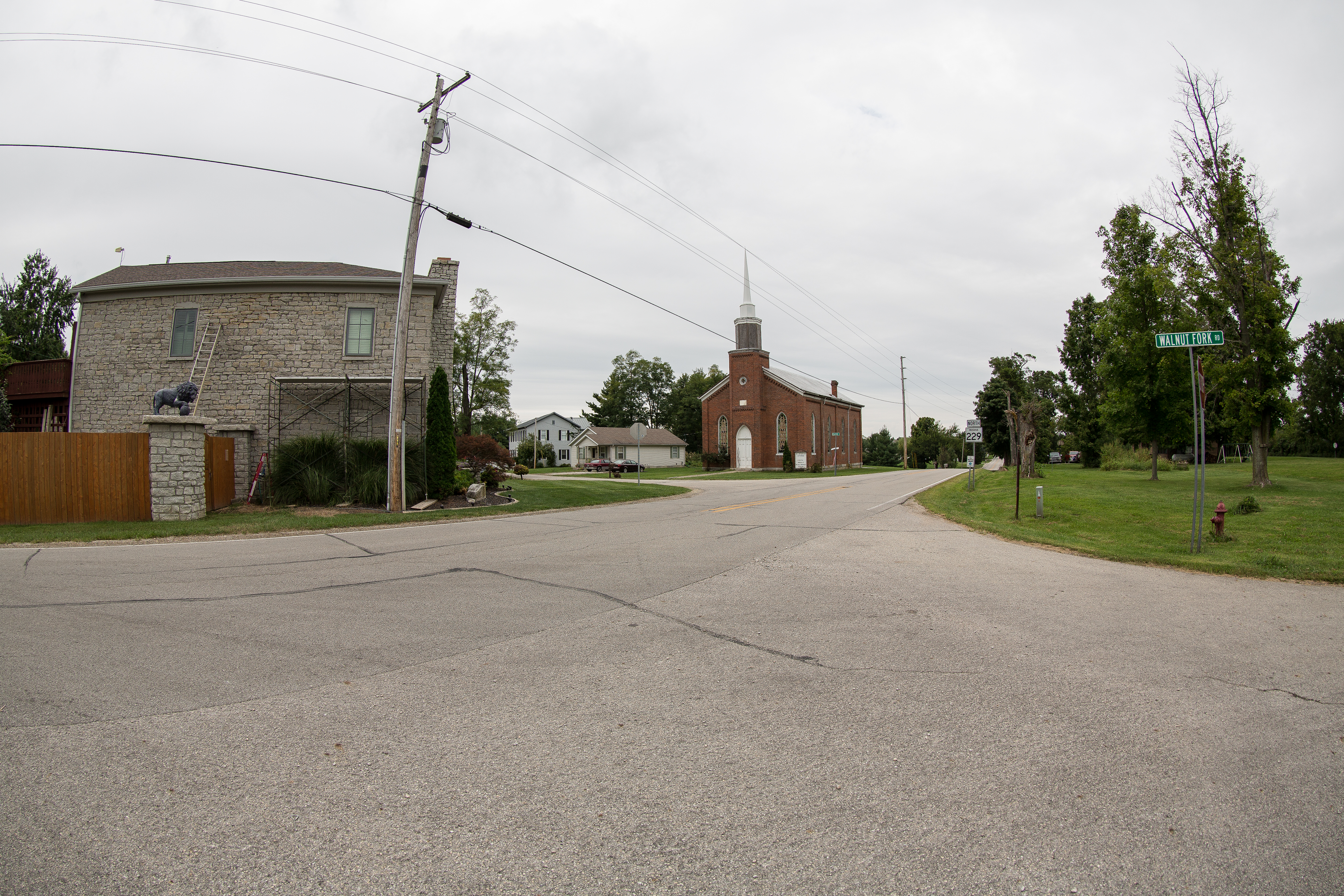

- Location within Indiana Location within the United States
- Coordinates: 39°23′57″N 85°10′33″W
- Country: United States
- State: Indiana
- County: Franklin
- Township: Salt Creek
- Elevation: 961 ft (293 m)
- ZIP code: 47030
- FIPS code: 18-58878
- GNIS feature ID: 2830380

Peppertown is an unincorporated community in Salt Creek Township, Franklin County, Indiana.

== History ==
Peppertown was platted in 1859 by Fielding Berry. It is named for August Pepper, who settled on the site in 1851. August Pepper worked as a calico printer.

== Demographics ==
The United States Census Bureau defined Peppertown as a census designated place in the 2022 American Community Survey.
