= Blooming Grove (Florence, South Carolina) =

Historic house in South Carolina, United States

- U.S. National Register of Historic Places
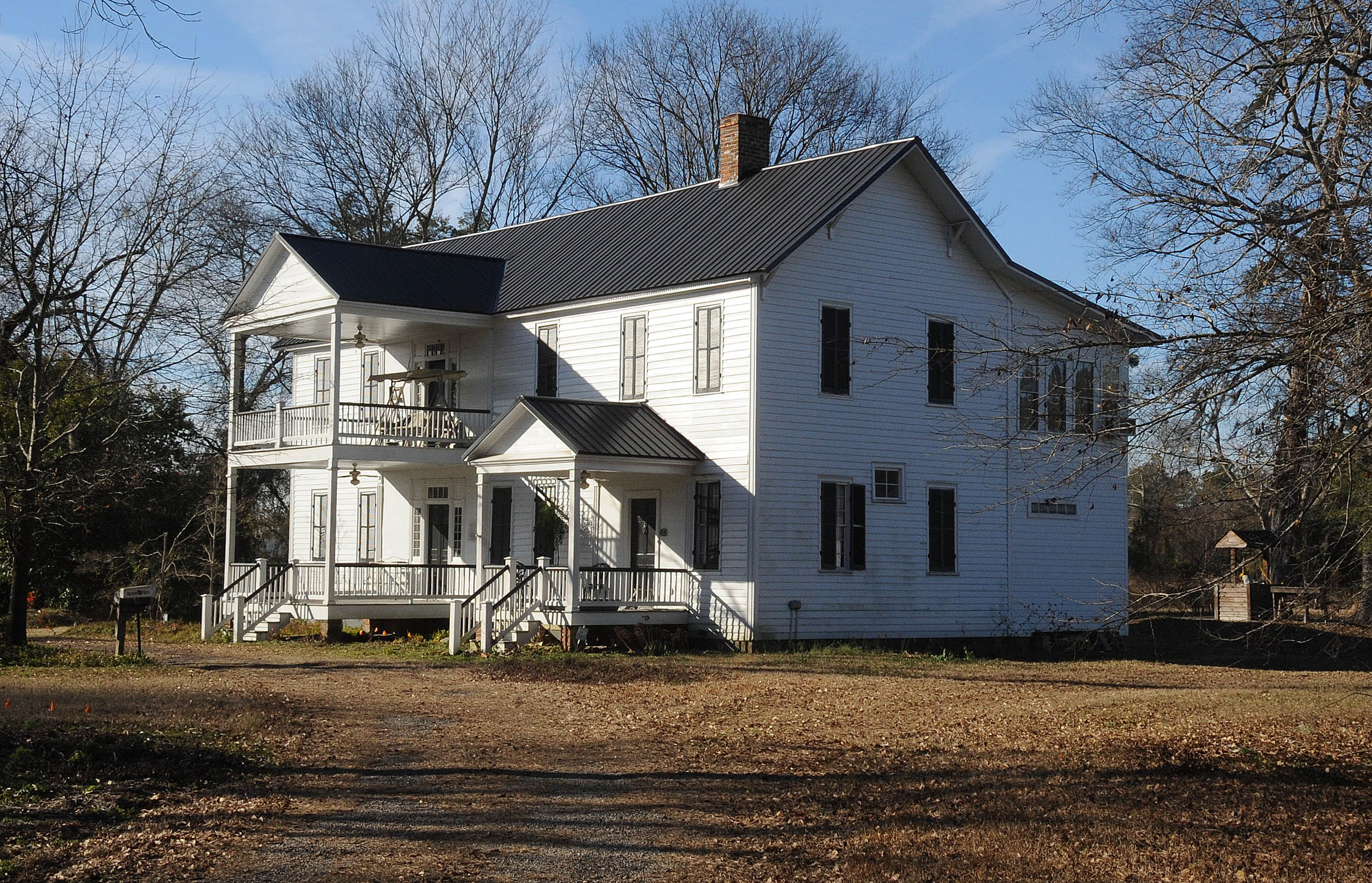

- Location within South Carolina Location within the United States
- Location: Eastern end of Rogers Court, near Florence, South Carolina
- Coordinates: 34°16′06″N 79°42′51″W
- Area: 0.5 acres (0.20 ha)
- Built: c. 1790
- Architectural style: Classical Revival
- NRHP reference No.: 05000517
- Added to NRHP: June 1, 2005

Blooming Grove, also known as the Mandeville-Rogers House, is a historic plantation house located near Florence, Florence County, South Carolina. It was originally constructed about 1790, with a two-story addition built between 1800 and 1820. It is an I-house form dwelling, with an Early Classical Revival two-story portico. Also on the property is a contributing brick-lined well. Blooming Grove is associated with Frank Mandeville Rogers (1857–1945), who promoted the growing of Bright Leaf tobacco in South Carolina. Rogers is believed to have owned 92 slaves.

It was listed on the National Register of Historic Places in 2005.
