= Laurel, Indiana =

- Town
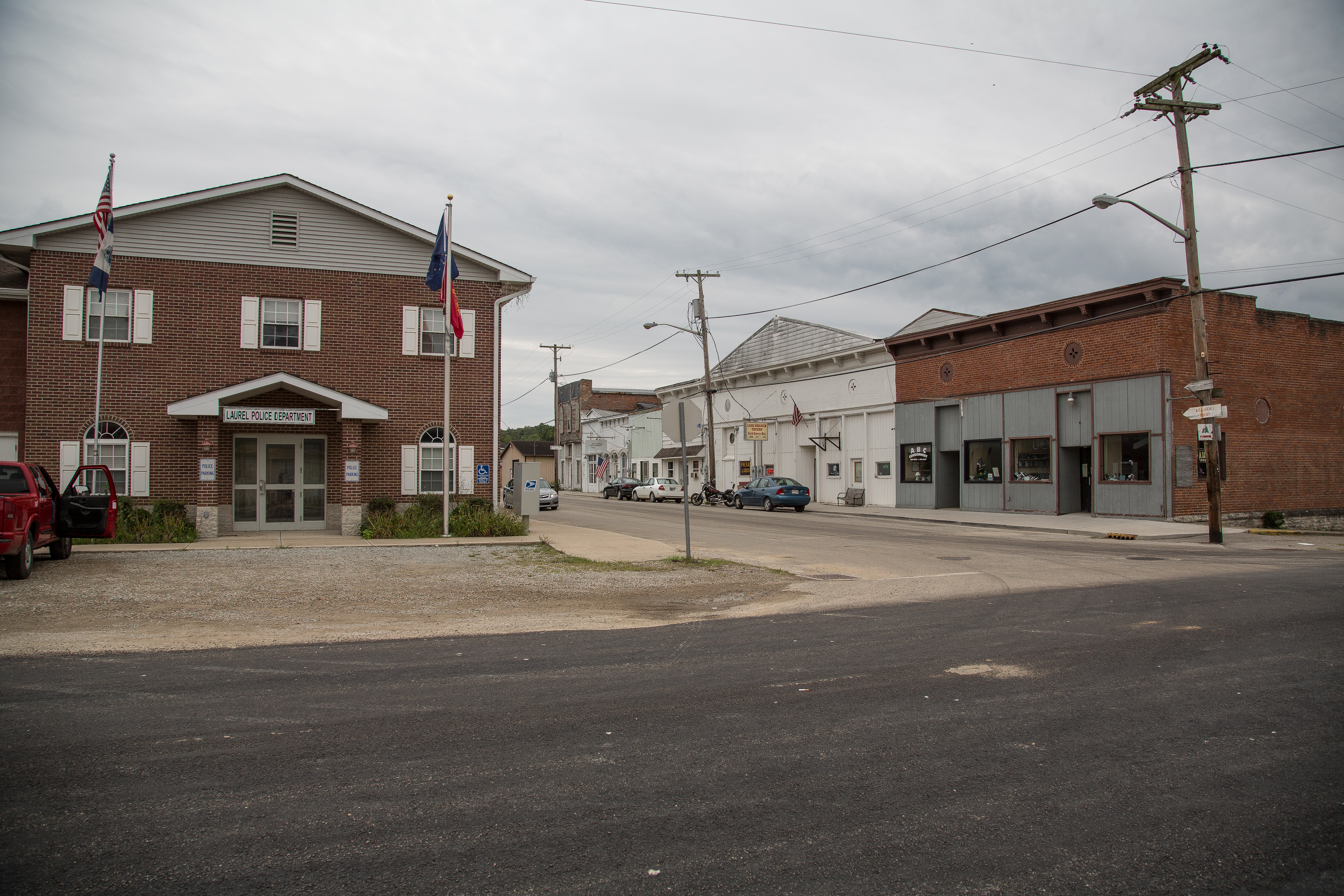

- Location of Laurel in Franklin County, Indiana.
- Coordinates: 39°30′01″N 85°11′16″W
- Country: United States
- State: Indiana
- County: Franklin
- Township: Laurel

Area
  - Total: 0.24 sq mi (0.62 km^{2})
  - Land: 0.24 sq mi (0.62 km^{2})
  - Water: 0 sq mi (0.00 km^{2})
- Elevation: 728 ft (222 m)

Population (2020)
  - Total: 406
  - Density: 1,705.7/sq mi (658.58/km^{2})
- Time zone: UTC-5 (Eastern (EST))
  - Summer (DST): UTC-4 (EDT)
- ZIP code: 47024
- Area code: 765
- FIPS code: 18-42372
- GNIS feature ID: 2396710

Laurel is a town in Laurel Township, Franklin County, Indiana, United States. As of the 2020 census, Laurel had a population of 406.

== History ==
Laurel was platted in 1836 by James Conwell, a native of Maryland. Conwell had first intended to name his settlement New Baltimore, but instead decided to call it Laurel, after the city of Laurel, Maryland. The last wild passenger pigeon, once the most common bird in North America, was shot near Laurel in 1902.

The Laurel post office was established in 1837.

== Geography ==
According to the 2010 census, Laurel has a total area of 0.24 square miles (0.62 km^{2}), all land.

== Demographics ==
Historical population
Census	Pop.	Note	%±
1860	670		—
1870	741		10.6%
1880	670		−9.6%
1900	600		—
1910	503		−16.2%
1920	515		2.4%
1930	516		0.2%
1940	533		3.3%
1950	680		27.6%
1960	848		24.7%
1970	753		−11.2%
1980	819		8.8%
1990	544		−33.6%
2000	579		6.4%
2010	512		−11.6%
2020	406		−20.7%
U.S. Decennial Census

=== 2010 census ===
As of the census of 2010, there were 512 people, 196 households, and 134 families living in the town. The population density was 2,133.3 inhabitants per square mile (823.7/km^{2}). There were 227 housing units at an average density of 945.8 per square mile (365.2/km^{2}). The racial makeup of the town was 98.4% White, 0.2% African American, 0.6% Native American, 0.2% from other races, and 0.6% from two or more races. Hispanic or Latino of any race were 2.5% of the population.

There were 196 households, of which 38.3% had children under the age of 18 living with them, 39.3% were married couples living together, 18.9% had a female householder with no husband present, 10.2% had a male householder with no wife present, and 31.6% were non-families. 23.0% of all households were made up of individuals, and 10.7% had someone living alone who was 65 years of age or older. The average household size was 2.61 and the average family size was 3.08.

The median age in the town was 34.8 years. 27% of residents were under the age of 18; 10.4% were between the ages of 18 and 24; 27.9% were from 25 to 44; 21% were from 45 to 64; and 13.7% were 65 years of age or older. The gender makeup of the town was 51.0% male and 49.0% female.

=== 2000 census ===
As of the census of 2000, there were 579 people, 201 households, and 155 families living in the town. The population density was 2,434.6 inhabitants per square mile (940.0/km^{2}). There were 220 housing units at an average density of 925.1 per square mile (357.2/km^{2}). The racial makeup of the town was 98.96% White, 0.17% from other races, and 0.86% from two or more races. Hispanic or Latino of any race were 1.21% of the population.

There were 201 households, out of which 41.3% had children under the age of 18 living with them, 55.7% were married couples living together, 13.4% had a female householder with no husband present, and 22.4% were non-families. 17.9% of all households were made up of individuals, and 8.0% had someone living alone who was 65 years of age or older. The average household size was 2.88 and the average family size was 3.21.

In the town, the population was spread out, with 31.4% under the age of 18, 10.4% from 18 to 24, 29.5% from 25 to 44, 18.1% from 45 to 64, and 10.5% who were 65 years of age or older. The median age was 30 years. For every 100 females there were 104.6 males. For every 100 females age 18 and over, there were 96.5 males.

The median income for a household in the town was $29,375, and the median income for a family was $33,625. Males had a median income of $28,846 versus $20,625 for females. The per capita income for the town was $12,035. About 11.6% of families and 13.6% of the population were below the poverty line, including 11.5% of those under age 18 and 22.8% of those age 65 or over.

== Education ==
Laurel has a public library, a branch of the Franklin County Public Library District.

== Notable people ==
- James Emmert, Indiana Attorney General and Justice of the Indiana Supreme Court

== See also ==
- Whitewater Canal
