= Whitewater Township, Franklin County, Indiana =

Whitewater Township
- Township
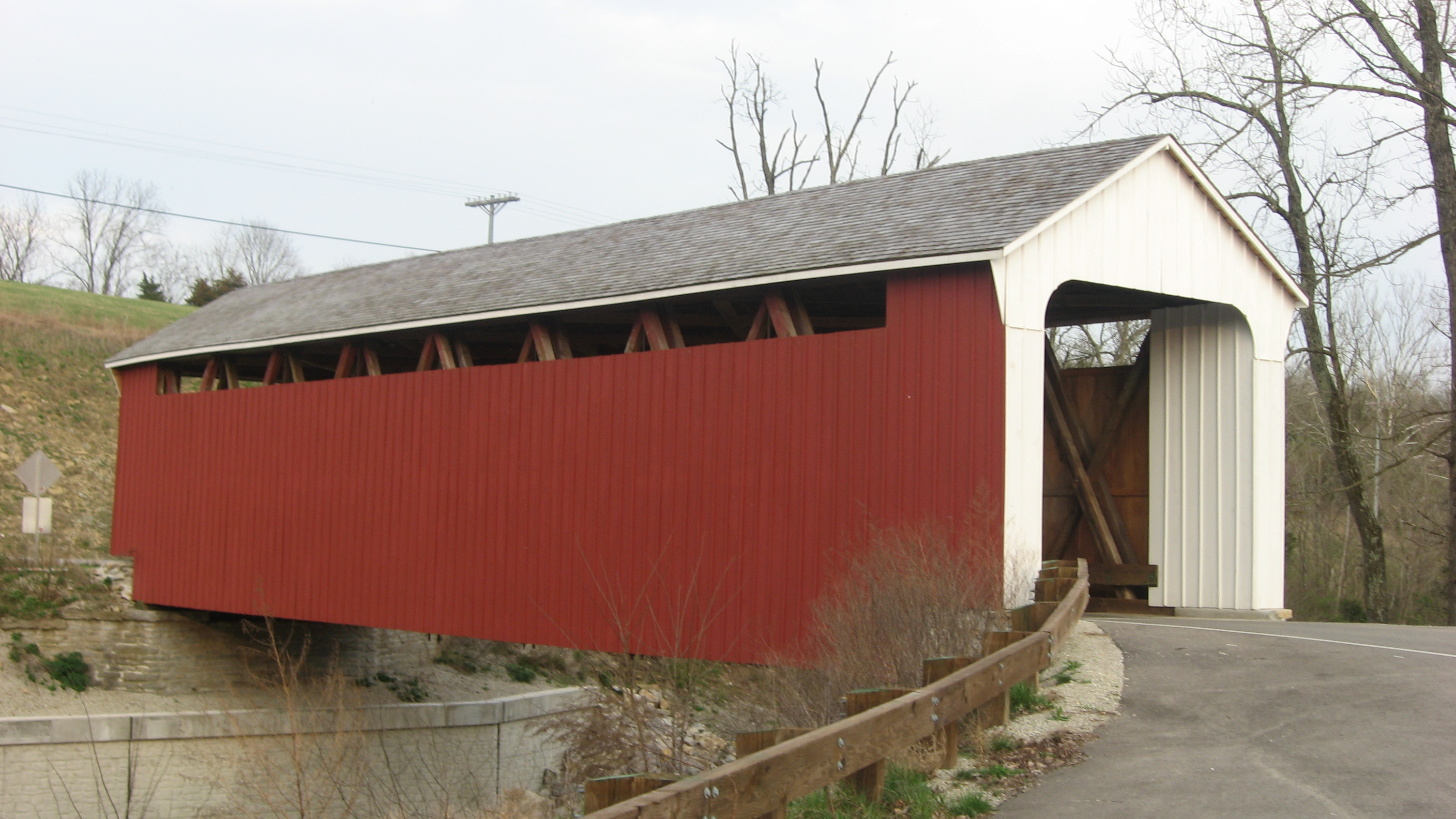
- Snow Hill Covered Bridge

- Location of Whitewater Township in Franklin County
- Coordinates: 39°20′55″N 84°52′18″W
- Country: United States
- State: Indiana
- County: Franklin

Government
  - Type: Indiana township

Area
  - Total: 35.21 sq mi (91.2 km^{2})
  - Land: 34.98 sq mi (90.6 km^{2})
  - Water: 0.23 sq mi (0.60 km^{2})
- Elevation: 889 ft (271 m)

Population (2020)
  - Total: 2,706
  - Density: 77.36/sq mi (29.87/km^{2})
- FIPS code: 18-84068
- GNIS feature ID: 454057

Whitewater Township is one of thirteen townships in Franklin County, Indiana. As of the 2020 census, its population was 2,706, up from 2,684 at 2010.

Historical population
Census	Pop.	Note	%±
1890	1,237		—
1900	1,154		−6.7%
1910	1,150		−0.3%
1920	1,122		−2.4%
1930	984		−12.3%
1940	1,011		2.7%
1950	1,110		9.8%
1960	1,255		13.1%
1970	1,393		11.0%
1980	1,925		38.2%
1990	1,890		−1.8%
2000	2,360		24.9%
2010	2,684		13.7%
2020	2,706		0.8%
Source: US Decennial Census

== History ==
Whitewater Township was created in 1816.

The Snow Hill Covered Bridge and Salmon Turrell Farmstead are listed on the National Register of Historic Places.

== Geography ==
According to the 2010 census, the township has a total area of 35.21 square miles (91.2 km^{2}), of which 34.98 square miles (90.6 km^{2}) (or 99.35%) is land and 0.23 square miles (0.60 km^{2}) (or 0.65%) is water.

=== Unincorporated towns ===
- Ashby (extinct)
- Drewersburg
- New Trenton
- Rockdale
- Sharptown

(This list is based on USGS data and may include former settlements.)

=== Major highways ===
- U.S. Route 52
- Indiana State Road 252

=== Cemeteries ===
The township contains two cemeteries: Otwell and Snow.
