= Blooming Grove Township, Franklin County, Indiana =

Blooming Grove Township
- Township
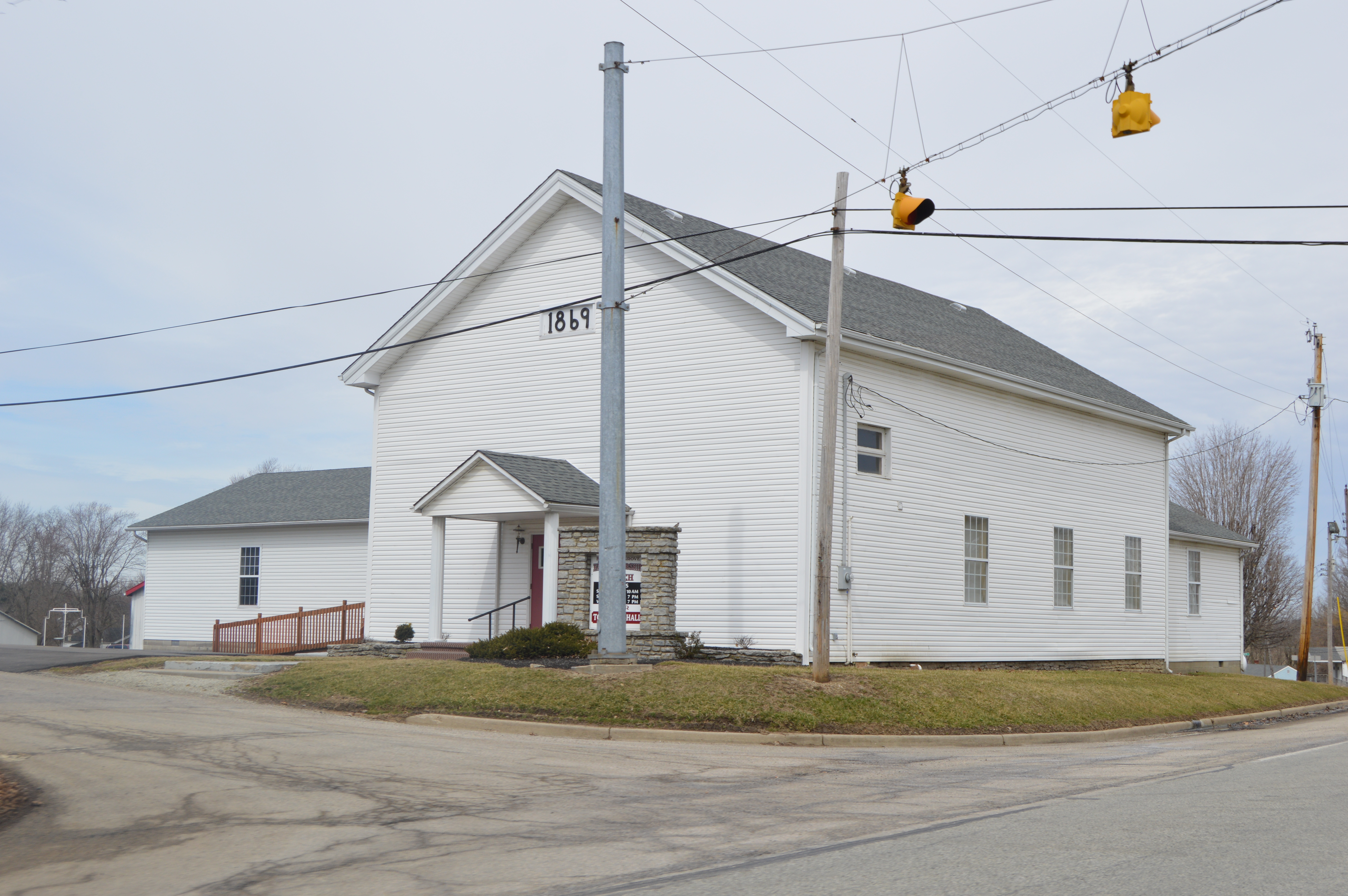
- Church in Blooming Grove

- Location of Blooming Grove Township in Franklin County
- Coordinates: 39°30′01″N 85°04′46″W
- Country: United States
- State: Indiana
- County: Franklin

Government
  - Type: Indiana township

Area
  - Total: 21.53 sq mi (55.8 km^{2})
  - Land: 21.49 sq mi (55.7 km^{2})
  - Water: 0.04 sq mi (0.10 km^{2})
- Elevation: 997 ft (304 m)

Population (2020)
  - Total: 1,012
  - Density: 47.09/sq mi (18.18/km^{2})
- FIPS code: 18-05824
- GNIS feature ID: 453114

Blooming Grove Township is one of thirteen townships in Franklin County, Indiana. As of the 2020 census, its population was 1,012, down from 1,154 at 2010.

== History ==
Blooming Grove Township was largely settled after the War of 1812.

== Geography ==
According to the 2010 census, the township has a total area of 21.53 square miles (55.8 km^{2}), of which 21.49 square miles (55.7 km^{2}) (or 99.81%) is land and 0.04 square miles (0.10 km^{2}) (or 0.19%) is water. Shady Lake is in this township.

=== Unincorporated towns ===
- Blooming Grove
- Pinhook

(This list is based on USGS data and may include former settlements.)

=== Adjacent townships ===
- Harmony Township, Union County (northeast)
- Fairfield Township (east)
- Brookville Township (southeast)
- Metamora Township (southwest)
- Laurel Township (west)
- Jackson Township, Fayette County (northwest)

=== Major highways ===
- Indiana State Road 1

=== Cemeteries ===
The township contains one cemetery, Ebenezer.

== Demographics ==
Historical population
Census	Pop.	Note	%±
1890	664		—
1900	653		−1.7%
1910	651		−0.3%
1920	590		−9.4%
1930	610		3.4%
1940	591		−3.1%
1950	592		0.2%
1960	662		11.8%
1970	455		−31.3%
1980	877		92.7%
1990	924		5.4%
2000	1,141		23.5%
2010	1,154		1.1%
2020	1,012		−12.3%
Source: US Decennial Census

As of the 2020 census, there were 1,012 people, 237 households, and 459 housing units. The racial makeup of the township was; 995 were White alone, 1 was American Indian/Alaska Native alone, 2 were of some other race, and 14 were two or more races. 4 were Hispanic/Latino of any race. The ancestry makeup of the township was; 15.8% German, 4.4% Irish, and 3.3% English. Of spoken languages; 93.5% only spoke English at home, 4.3% spoke Spanish at home, and 2.2% spoke other Indo-European languages at home.

The median income of the township was $76,397. 12.6% were under the poverty line. Homeownership was 87.8% within the township. Of the 397 occupied housing units within the township, 143 were married, 11 had a male householder with no spouse present, and 13 had a female householder with no spouse present. 79.3% had 2 or 3 bedrooms, and 20.7% had 4 or more bedrooms. Of all housing units, 62 are vacant.

The gender makeup of the township was; Of males; 70 were under 5 years of age, 84 were between the ages of 5–9 years, 33 were between the ages of 20–24 years, 25 were between the ages of 25–29 years, 36 were between the ages of 30–34 years, 77 were between the ages of 35–39 years, 19 were between the ages of 40–44 years, 48 were between the ages of 50–54 years, 28 were between the ages of 55–59 years, 36 were between the ages of 60–64 years, and 7 were between the ages of 65–69 years. Of females; 23 were under 5 years of age, 39 were between the ages of 5–9 years, 8 were between the ages of 10–14 years, 11 were between the ages of 25–29 years, 24 were between the ages of 30–34 years, 12 were between the ages of 45–49 years, 35 were between the ages of 50–54 years, 38 were between the ages of 55–59 years, 23 were between the ages of 60–64 years, and 11 were between the ages of 65–69 years. The median age of the township was 34.4.

Of education and employment, 45.2% had a high school or equivalent degree, 25% went to college but had no degree, 17.5% had an associate degree, and 8% had a bachelor's degree. School enrollment in kindergarten to 12th grade was 100%. Of employers, 85% were employees of private companies, 11.5% were private not-for-profit wage and salary workers, and 3.5% were local, state, and federal government workers. The employment rate was 66.2%

== Education ==
Blooming Grove Township residents may obtain a free library card from the Franklin County Public Library District in Brookville.
