= Bath Township, Franklin County, Indiana =

Bath Township
- Township
- Location of Bath Township in Franklin County
- Coordinates: 39°30′07″N 84°52′39″W
- Country: United States
- State: Indiana
- County: Franklin

Government
  - Type: Indiana township

Area
  - Total: 18.49 sq mi (47.9 km^{2})
  - Land: 18.46 sq mi (47.8 km^{2})
  - Water: 0.03 sq mi (0.078 km^{2})
- Elevation: 1,030 ft (314 m)

Population (2020)
  - Total: 355
  - Density: 19.2/sq mi (7.43/km^{2})
- FIPS code: 18-03700
- GNIS feature ID: 453098

Bath Township is one of 13 townships in Franklin County, Indiana. As of the 2020 census, its population was 355, down from 369 at 2010.

== History ==
The name of Bath is probably derived from local mineral springs said to hold medicinal qualities.

== Geography ==
According to the 2010 census, the township has a total area of 18.49 square miles (47.9 km^{2}), of which 18.46 square miles (47.8 km^{2}) (or 99.84%) is land and 0.03 square miles (0.078 km^{2}) (or 0.16%) is water.

=== Unincorporated towns ===
- Bath
- Mixersville
- Old Bath

(This list is based on USGS data and may include former settlements.)

=== Cemeteries ===
The township contains one cemetery, Bethlehem.

== Demographics ==
Historical population
Census	Pop.	Note	%±
1890	658		—
1900	557		−15.3%
1910	604		8.4%
1920	557		−7.8%
1930	561		0.7%
1940	539		−3.9%
1950	517		−4.1%
1960	558		7.9%
1970	684		22.6%
1980	453		−33.8%
1990	405		−10.6%
2000	400		−1.2%
2010	369		−7.7%
2020	355		−3.8%
Source: US Decennial Census

As of the 2020 census, there were 355 people, 101 households, and 149 housing units. The racial makeup of the township was; 329 were White alone, 2 were of some other race, and 24 were two or more races. 4 were Hispanic/Latino of any race. The ancestry makeup of the township was; 37.8% German, 36.7% Irish, and 5.3% Scottish. All residents spoke English at home.

The median income of the township was $78,750 for families, and 17.3% were under the poverty line. Homeownership was 100% within the township. Of the 139 occupied housing units within the township, 39 (38.6%) were married, 24 (14.9%) had a male householder with no spouse present, and 38 (37.6%) had a female householder with no spouse present. 61.4% had 2 or 3 bedrooms, and 38.6% had 4 or more bedrooms. Of all housing units, 10 are vacant.

The gender makeup of the township was; Of males; 24 were between the ages of 10–14 years, 20 were between the ages of 15–19 years, 19 were between the ages of 20–24 years, 26 were between the ages of 35–39 years, 9 were between the ages of 40–44 years, 34 were between the ages of 50–54 years, and 20 were between the ages of 70–74 years. Of females; 9 were between the ages of 10–14 years, 37 were between the ages of 15–19 years, 9 were between the ages of 35–39 years, 15 were between the ages of 45–49 years, 41 were between the ages of 55–59 years, and 20 were between the ages of 70–74 years. The median age of the township was 38.7.

Of education and employment, 51.1% had a high school or equivalent degree, 24.7% went to college but had no degree, 10.3% had an associate degree, 5.2% had a bachelor's degree, and 8.6% had a graduate or professional degree. School enrollment in kindergarten to 12th grade was 34.4%, and 65.6% had a college undergraduate degree. Of employers, 76.4% were employees of private companies, 11.2% were private not-for-profit wage and salary workers, and 12.4% were self-employed in own not incorporated business workers and unpaid family workers. The employment rate was 64.4%

== Education ==
Residents are in the Union County–College Corner Joint School District.
