= Saint Marys, Franklin County, Indiana =

Unincorporated community in Indiana, U.S.

Coordinates: 39°20′52″N 85°06′32″W

Saint Marys is an unincorporated community in Butler Township, Franklin County, in the U.S. state of Indiana.

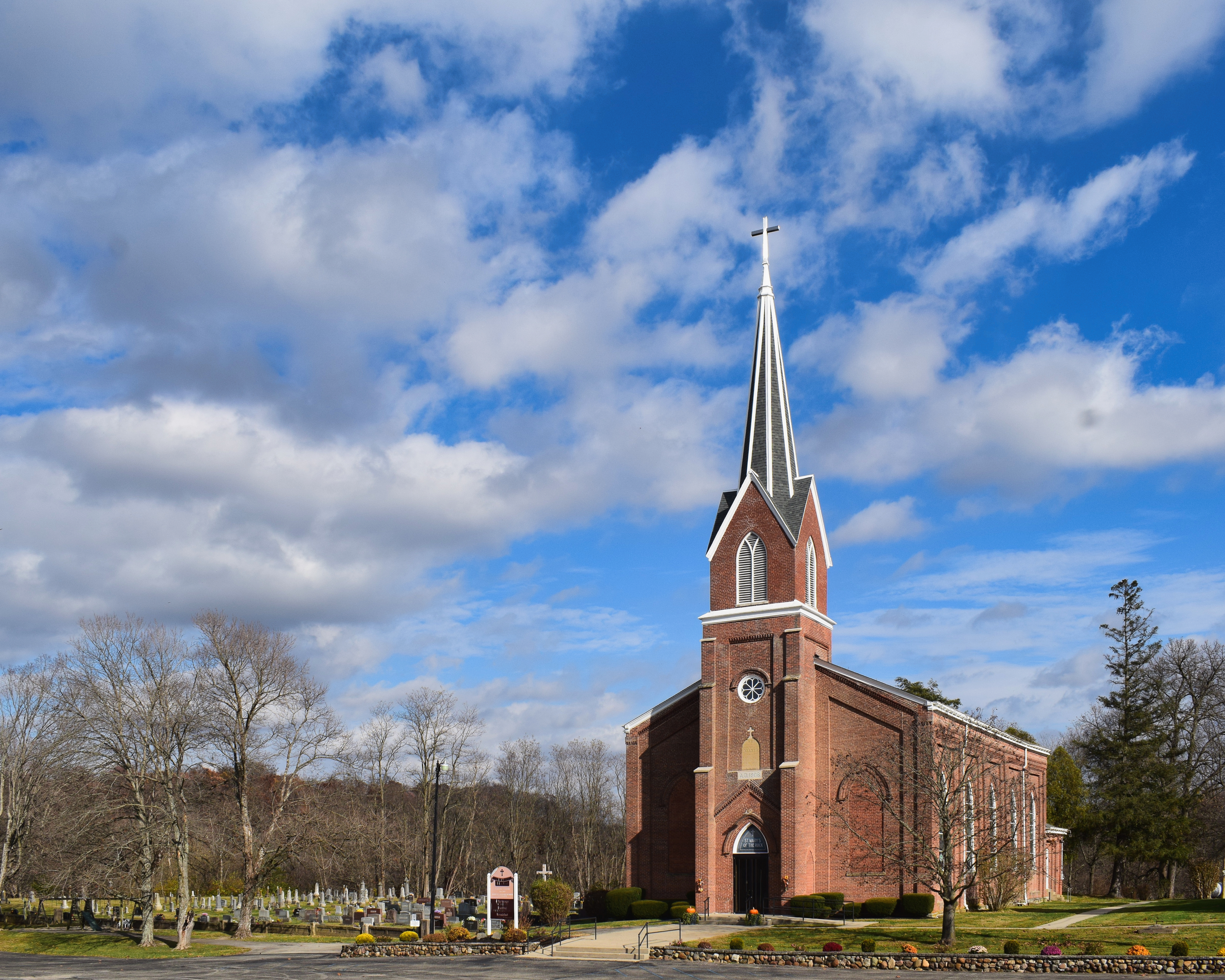
Saint Mary's-of-the-Rock Church in 2025

The community took its name from St. Mary's of the Rock Roman Catholic church located in the township near Pipe Creek along St. Mary's Road.
