= Millville, Franklin County, Indiana =

Unincorporated community in Indiana, U.S.

Coordinates: 39°26′57″N 85°07′25″W

Millville is an unincorporated community in Franklin County, Indiana, in the United States.

== History ==
Early settlers of Millville in Franklin County had family ties to Millville, Ohio.
