= Blooming Grove, Indiana =

Unincorporated community in Indiana, U.S.

Coordinates: 39°30′08″N 85°03′53″W

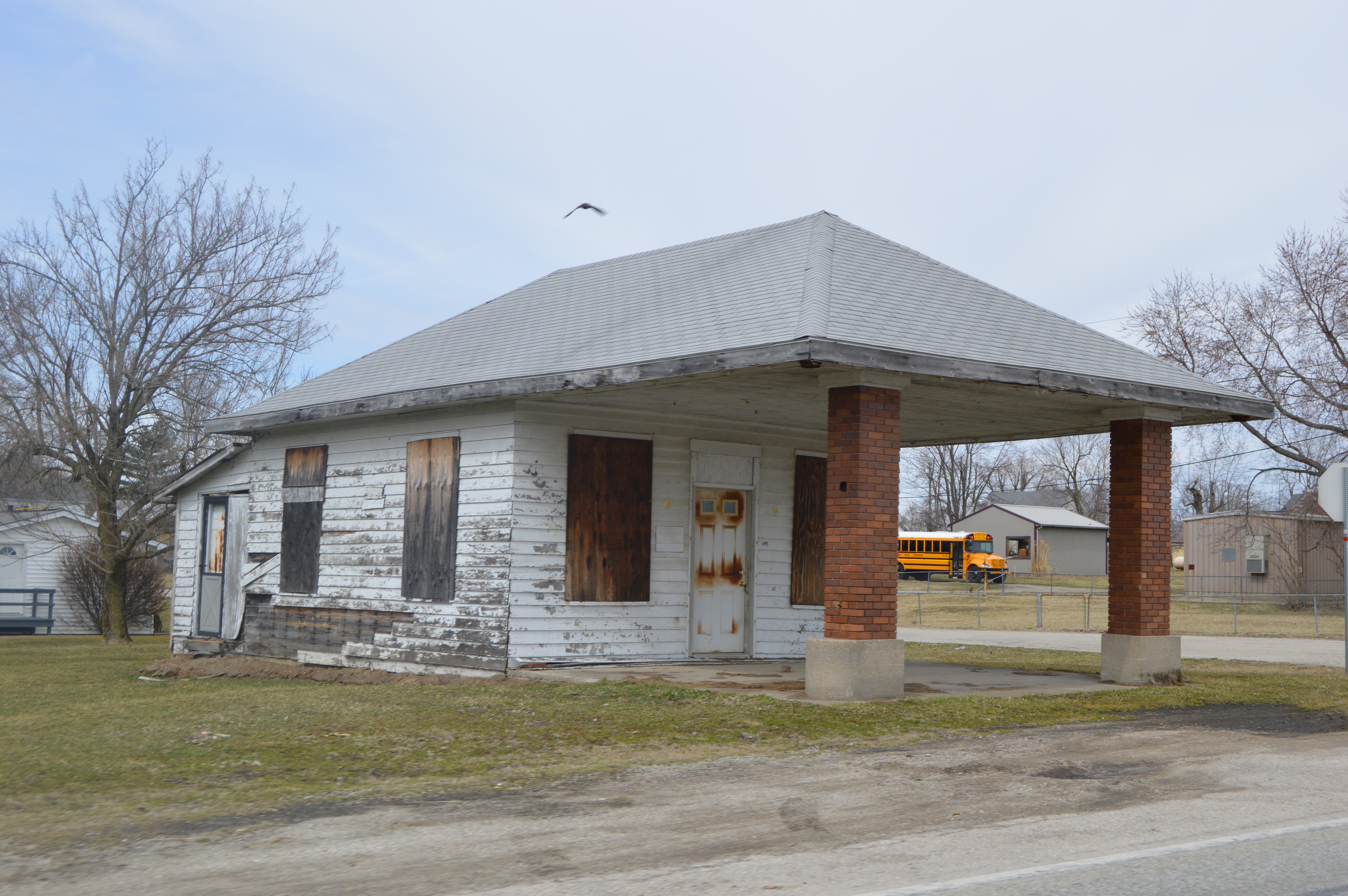
Former gas station on State Road 1

Blooming Grove is an unincorporated community in Blooming Grove Township, Franklin County, Indiana.

== History ==
Blooming Grove was platted in 1816. The community took its name from Blooming Grove Township. A post office was established at Blooming Grove in 1832, and remained in operation until it was discontinued in 1906.

== Demographics ==
The United States Census Bureau delineated Blooming Grove as a census designated place in the 2022 American Community Survey.
