= National Register of Historic Places listings in Franklin County, Indiana =

Location of Franklin County in Indiana

This is a list of the National Register of Historic Places listings in Franklin County, Indiana.

This is intended to be a complete list of the properties and districts on the National Register of Historic Places in Franklin County, Indiana, United States. Latitude and longitude coordinates are provided for many National Register properties and districts; these locations may be seen together in a map.

There are 14 properties and districts listed on the National Register in the county, including one National Historic Landmark.

Properties and districts located in incorporated areas display the name of the municipality, while properties and districts in unincorporated areas display the name of their civil township. Properties and districts split between multiple jurisdictions display the names of all jurisdictions.

This National Park Service list is complete through NPS recent listings posted April 3, 2026.

== Current listings ==
	Name on the Register	Image	Date listed	Location	City or town	Description
1	Brookville Historic District	Brookville Historic District	July 25, 1975 (#75000018)	Bounded by the east and west forks of the Whitewater River and State Road 101; 39°25′22″N 85°00′35″W	Brookville	
2	Cedar Grove Bridge	Cedar Grove Bridge	September 30, 2014 (#14000801)	Old State Road 1 over the Whitewater River; 39°21′12″N 84°56′35″W	Cedar Grove and Highland Township	
3	Duck Creek Aqueduct	Duck Creek Aqueduct	August 25, 2014 (#14000922)	Spanning Duck Creek at the Whitewater Canal; 39°26′46″N 85°07′48″W	Metamora Township	
4	Franklin County Seminary	Franklin County Seminary	March 28, 1974 (#74000020)	412 5th St. 39°25′10″N 85°00′31″W	Brookville	
5	The Hermitage	The Hermitage	March 22, 2004 (#04000209)	650 E. 8th St. 39°25′25″N 85°00′17″W	Brookville	
6	Little Cedar Grove Baptist Church	Little Cedar Grove Baptist Church	March 22, 1990 (#90000366)	U.S. Route 52 at Little Cedar Rd., southeast of Brookville; 39°23′14″N 84°58′53″W	Brookville Township	
7	Metamora Historic District	Metamora Historic District	December 7, 1992 (#92001646)	Roughly bounded by U.S. Route 52, Columbia St., the Whitewater Canal, Duck Creek, Mount St., and Main St., at Metamora; 39°26′49″N 85°08′01″W	Metamora	
8	Oldenburg Historic District	Oldenburg Historic District	March 3, 1983 (#83000031)	Bounded roughly by Sycamore, church land woods, Indiana and Water Sts., and Gehring Farm; 39°20′27″N 85°12′09″W	Oldenburg and Ray Township	
9	Old Franklin United Brethren Church	Old Franklin United Brethren Church	March 3, 1995 (#95000201)	Junction of Franklin Church Rd. and State Road 101, 0.5 miles north of Fox Run Rd. and northeast of Brookville; 39°30′22″N 84°56′56″W	Fairfield Township	
10	Joseph Shafer Farm	Joseph Shafer Farm	August 26, 1982 (#82000038)	Northeast of Brookville on Flinn Road; 39°28′26″N 84°52′46″W	Springfield Township	
11	Snow Hill Covered Bridge	Snow Hill Covered Bridge	March 3, 1995 (#95000208)	Snow Hill Rd. over Johnson Fork, north of Rockdale; 39°19′32″N 84°51′06″W	Whitewater Township	
12	Stockheughter Covered Bridge	Stockheughter Covered Bridge	March 20, 2002 (#02000198)	27046 Enochsburg Rd., northwest of Batesville; 39°20′01″N 85°16′52″W	Ray Township	
13	Salmon Turrell Farmstead	Salmon Turrell Farmstead	June 17, 2009 (#09000423)	3051 Snow Hill Rd., northwest of West Harrison; 39°19′40″N 84°51′37″W	Whitewater Township	
14	Whitewater Canal Historic District	Whitewater Canal Historic District	June 13, 1973 (#73000272)	From the Laurel Feeder Dam to Brookville; 39°27′33″N 85°06′34″W	Brookville and Brookville, Laurel, and Metamora Townships	

== See also ==
- List of National Historic Landmarks in Indiana
- National Register of Historic Places listings in Indiana
- Listings in neighboring counties: Butler (OH), Dearborn, Decatur, Fayette, Hamilton (OH), Ripley, Rush, Union
- List of Indiana state historical markers in Franklin County
