= List of Indiana state historical markers in Franklin County =

Location of Franklin County in Indiana

This is a list of the Indiana state historical markers in Franklin County.

This is intended to be a complete list of the official state historical markers placed in Franklin County, Indiana, United States by the Indiana Historical Bureau. The locations of the historical markers and their latitude and longitude coordinates are included below when available, along with their names, years of placement, and topics as recorded by the Historical Bureau. There are 14 historical markers located in Franklin County.

== Historical markers ==
Marker title	Image	Year placed	Location	Topics
Whitewater Canal		?	Northern side of U.S. Route 52 at Gordon's Lock #24 east of Metamora; 39°26′49″N 85°7′27.3″W	Transportation, Business, Industry, and Labor
Little Cedar Grove Baptist Church		1949	Northern side of the junction of U.S. Route 52 and Little Cedar Road, 3 miles south of Brookville at Mound Haven; 39°23′14″N 84°58′54″W	Religion, Buildings and Architecture
Whetzel Trace (1818–1823)		1965	Junction of Main (State Road 121 and Toner Streets in southern Laurel; 39°29′56.4″N 85°11′26.4″W	Early Settlement and Exploration, Transportation
Brookville, Franklin County (Platted 1808)		1966	Northern side of U.S. Route 52 in eastern Brookville; 39°24′38″N 85°0′38.7″W	Historic District, Neighborhoods, and Towns, Politics
Academy of the Immaculate Conception		1971	Junction of Washington and Wein Strasse on the grounds of the academy in Oldenburg; 39°20′32″N 85°12′4″W	Religion, Education
Brookville Historic District		1992	Western lawn of the Franklin County Courthouse along Main Street (U.S. Route 52/State Road 1) in Brookville; 39°25′10″N 85°0′45.6″W	Historic District, Neighborhoods, and Towns, Early Settlement and Exploration
Old Franklin United Brethren Church		1995	14023 Franklin Church Road near the road's dead end: north of the Mounds State Recreation Area offices, west of State Road 101, and south of Fairfield Causeway Road, near Brookville; 39°30′22″N 84°56′54″W	Religion, Early Settlement and Exploration
Brookville's Carnegie Library		1995	919 N. Main Street in Brookville; 39°25′28.6″N 85°0′44″W	Carnegie Library
Intersection of Treaty Lines		1995	Junction of Castle and St. Marys Roads, about 2 miles west of Brookville; 39°24′29″N 85°3′10.6″W	Early Settlement and Exploration, American Indian/Native American
Brookville's Grandstand		2002	Junction of 8th and Mill Streets in the town park in Brookville; 39°25′32″N 85°0′29″W	Sports, Buildings and Architecture
Snow Hill Covered Bridge		2005	Carries Snow Hill Road over Johnson Fork near Rockdale; 39°19′32″N 84°51′6″W	Transportation, Buildings and Architecture
Brigadier-General CSA Francis Asbury Shoup		2006	In the Conwell Cemetery along State Road 121 near Laurel; 39°30′16″N 85°11′4″W	Military, Education, African American
Passenger Pigeon Extinction		2017	Gazebo Park, Whitewater Canal State Historic Site (near lock #25), 19083 Clayborn St., Metamora; 39°26′50″N 85°8′10″W	Science, Nature
Lester "Marvelo" Lake 1904-1977		2018	Just south of the intersection of US 52 and St Peters Rd., New Trenton; 39°18′47″N 84°54′8″W	
Lester "Marvelo" Lake 1904-1977		2024	TBD; This marker replaces 2018 marker Lester "Marvelo" Lake, 1904–1977.	

== See also ==
- List of Indiana state historical markers
- National Register of Historic Places listings in Franklin County, Indiana
