= Hamburg, Indiana =

Hamburg is the name of the following places in the U.S. state of Indiana:

- Hamburg, Clark County, Indiana
- Hamburg, Franklin County, Indiana
