= Highland center =

- Highland Center, Indiana
- Hollywood and Highland Center
- Highland Center serving the High Huts of the White Mountains
