= Hamburg, Franklin County, Indiana =

Hamburg, Indiana
- Unincorporated community and Census-designated place
- Location within Indiana Location within the United States
- Coordinates: 39°22′54″N 85°15′03″W
- Country: United States
- State: Indiana
- County: Franklin
- Township: Ray
- Elevation: 974 ft (297 m)
- ZIP code: 47036
- FIPS code: 18-30564
- GNIS feature ID: 2830377

Hamburg is an unincorporated community in Ray Township, Franklin County, Indiana.

== History ==
Hamburg was platted in 1864 by Wesley Martin. It was named after Hamburg, in Germany.

Hamburg was once a thriving Catholic community. St. Ann's Catholic Church was founded in Hamburg in 1869. The Church closed its doors in 2013 merging with Holy Family Parish in Oldenburg.

A post office was established at Hamburg in 1867, and remained in operation until it was discontinued in 1929.

During the Super Outbreak on April 3, 1974, a tornado destroyed 90% of the town.
