= Duck Creek Aqueduct =

- U.S. National Register of Historic Places
- U.S. National Historic Landmark
- U.S. Historic district – Contributing property
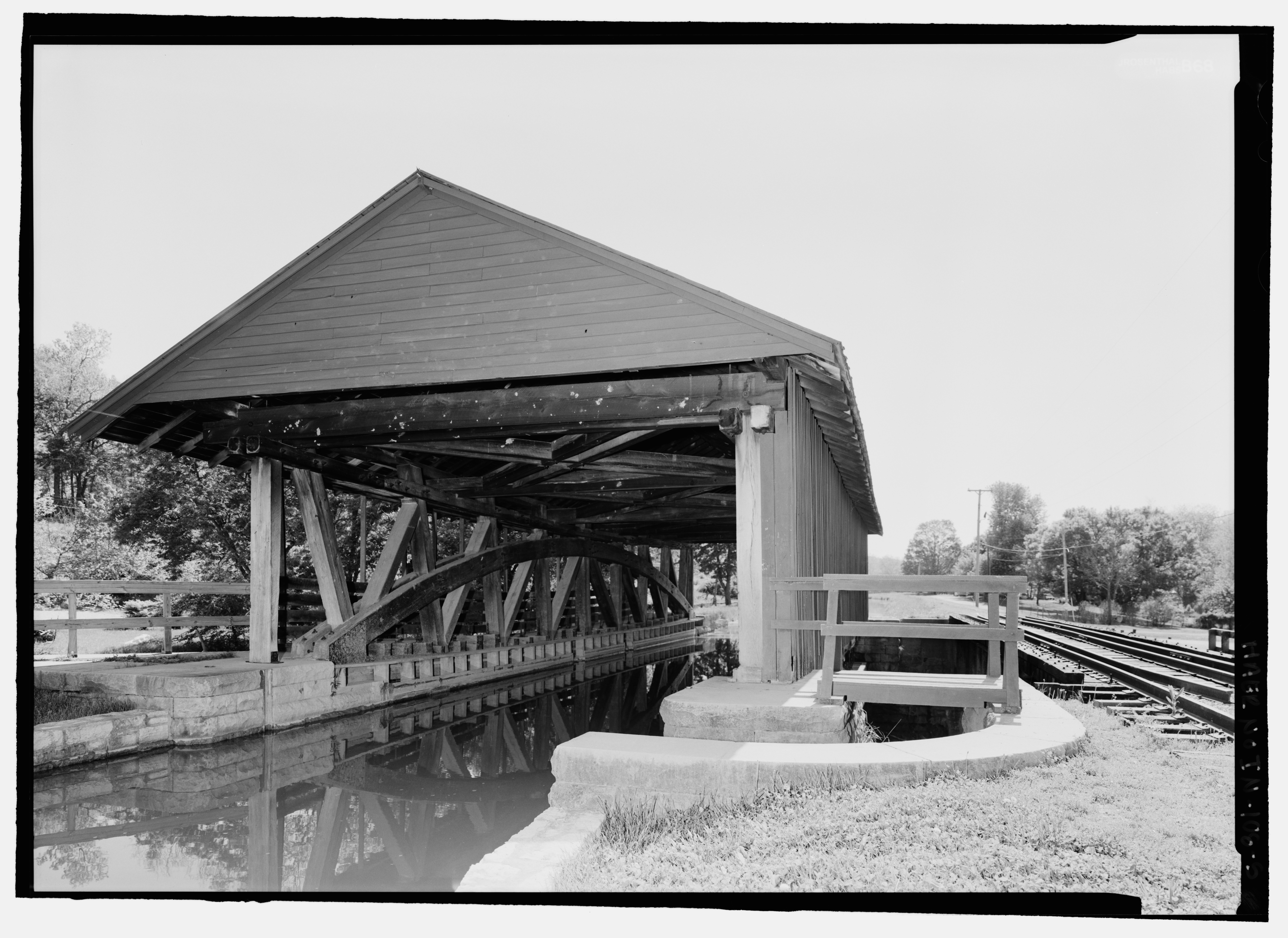
- Duck Creek Aqueduct, HAER Photo, 2004

- Location within Indiana Location within the United States
- Location: Spanning Duck Creek at the Whitewater Canal, Metamora Township, Franklin County, Indiana
- Coordinates: 39°26′46″N 85°07′48″W
- Area: less than one acre
- Built: 1846, 1868, 1901, 1946-1949
- Built by: Whitewater Canal Company; Henry C. Moore,
- Architectural style: Burr Through Truss
- Part of: Whitewater Canal Historic District, Metamora Historic District (ID73000272, 92001646)
- NRHP reference No.: 14000922

Significant dates
- Added to NRHP: August 25, 2014
- Designated NHL: August 25, 2014
- Designated CP: June 13, 1973, December 7, 1992

Duck Creek Aqueduct, also known as the Metamora Aqueduct and Whitewater Canal Aqueduct, is a historic aqueduct carrying the Whitewater Canal over Duck Creek in Metamora Township, Franklin County, Indiana. Built in 1846, it is the only surviving covered wood aqueduct in the United States. The aqueduct was listed on the National Register of Historic Places and designated a National Historic Landmark in 2014. It is located in the Whitewater Canal Historic District and part of the Metamora Historic District.

== Description and history ==
The Duck Creek Aqueduct is located on the eastern fringe of the village of Metamora. The canal is paralleled by Metamora's Main Street as well as railroad tracks. Due to its wooden construction, the aqueduct closely resembles a traditional covered bridge. It is a single-span Burr through truss aqueduct and measures approximately 90 feet (27 m) long and 25 feet (7.6 m) wide, with a structural height of 25 feet (7.6 m). The trough carrying the canal is formed out of oak beams and panels, and carries water to a normal depth of 2–3 feet (0.61–0.91 m). Water management valves and a spillway at the western end of the structure permit regulation of the water level of the canal. The roof is a 20th-century metal standing seam roof.

The original aqueduct was built between 1839 and 1843 as part of the canal's original construction. The present structure was built in 1846, after the original aqueduct was washed out in a flood. It was strengthened in 1868, and repaired in 1901. After abandonment and deterioration, the Duck Creek Aqueduct was restored to its present appearance in 1946–1949. It has since undergone regular maintenance, including a historically sensitive replacement of the trough in 2005.

Covered bridge aqueducts were never particularly common in the United States. In a nationwide survey conducted for the National Park Service in the 2010s, only ten structures were identified through historic records. The Duck Creek Aqueduct is the only one of these still standing.

== See also ==
- List of bridges documented by the Historic American Engineering Record in Indiana
- List of National Historic Landmarks in Indiana
- National Register of Historic Places listings in Franklin County, Indiana
- Metamora, Indiana
