= Cedar Grove Bridge =

- U.S. National Register of Historic Places
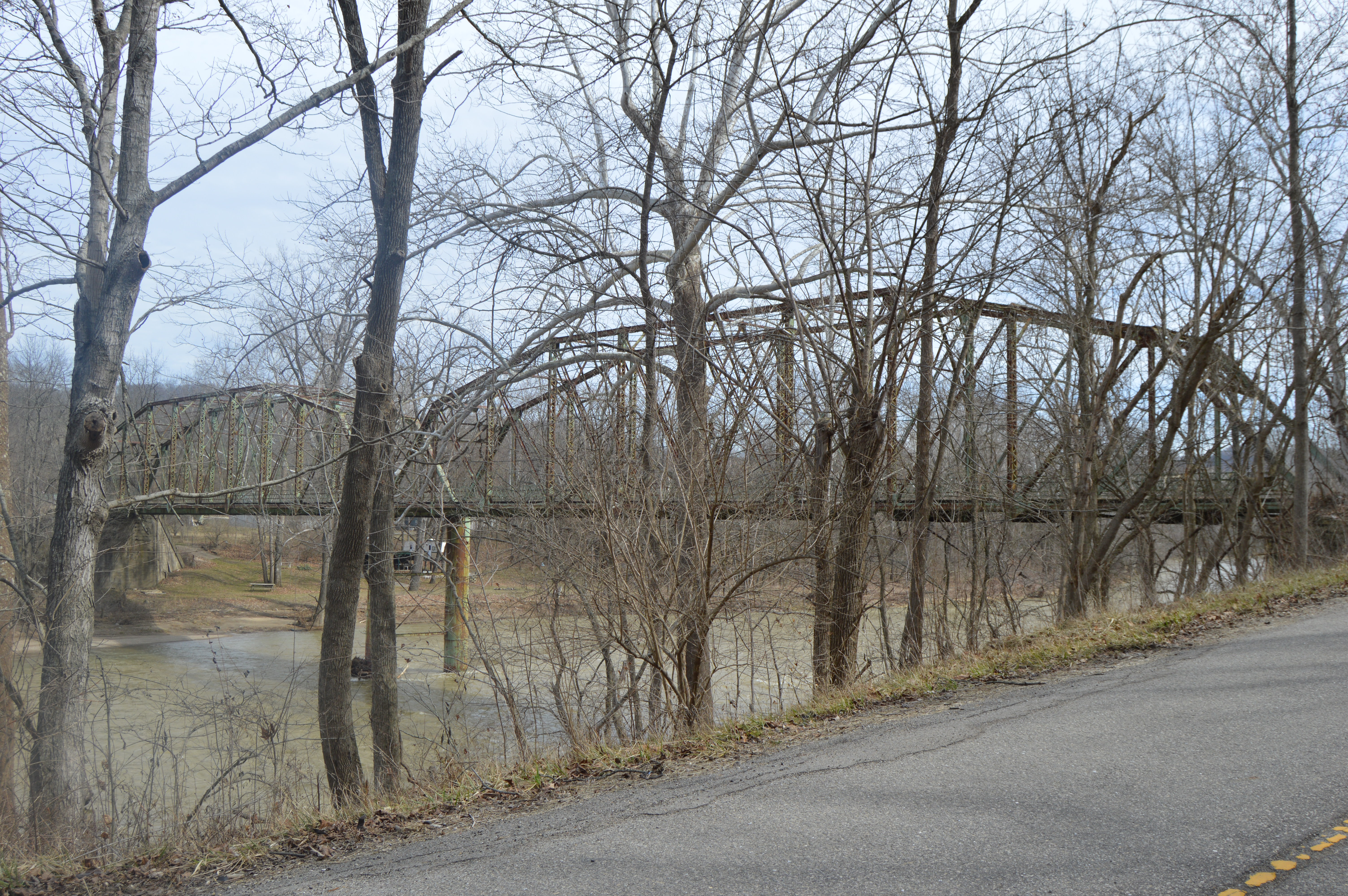
- Cedar Grove Bridge, March 2015

- Location within Indiana Location within the United States
- Location: Old State Road 1 over the Whitewater River, Cedar Grove and Highland Township, Franklin County, Indiana
- Coordinates: 39°21′12″N 84°56′35″W
- Area: less than one acre
- Built: 1914
- Built by: Indiana Bridge Company
- Architectural style: Camelback Pratt Through Truss
- Demolished: 2016
- NRHP reference No.: 14000801
- Added to NRHP: September 30, 2014

Cedar Grove Bridge, also known as Indiana State Bridge #6625B, was a historic Camelback Pratt Through Truss bridge spanning the Whitewater River in Cedar Grove and Highland Township, Franklin County, Indiana. The bridge had two spans and was built in 1914. Each span of the bridge was 180 feet long, and the overall length of the bridge was 386 feet and had a roadway 18 feet wide.

The bridge carried State Route 1 over the river until 1999, when it was closed. It was listed on the National Register of Historic Places in 2014. It was demolished on February 17, 2016.
