= Klemmes Corner, Indiana =

- Unincorporated community
- Location within Indiana Location within the United States
- Coordinates: 39°21′14″N 85°00′13″W
- Country: United States
- State: Indiana
- County: Franklin
- Township: Highland
- Elevation: 981 ft (299 m)
- ZIP code: 47012
- FIPS code: 18-40122
- GNIS feature ID: 449792

Klemmes Corner is an unincorporated community in Highland Township, Franklin County, Indiana.

== History ==
Klemmes Corner received its name from a store Albert Klemme kept there. Klemmes Corner had a post office under the name Blue Creek. The Blue Creek post office was in operation from 1849 until 1904.
