= Big Cedar Baptist Church and Burying Ground =

Church in Franklin County, Indiana, US

Coordinates: 39.451877°N 84.911401°W

- Interactive map of Big Cedar Baptist Church and Burying Ground

Details
- Location: Big Cedar Creek Road, Springfield Township, Franklin County, Indiana

Big Cedar Baptist Church and Burying Ground is located on Big Cedar Creek Road, between the road to Reily and the Oxford Pike, in Springfield Township, Franklin County, Indiana. Big Cedar was a branch of the Little Cedar Grove Baptist Church, which was the first church constituted in the Whitewater River Valley, by Elder William Tyner, who had come with colony from Virginia about 1797.

== History ==
The Baptist church on Big Cedar in the state of Indiana, Franklin county and Springfield Township, with 13 members, was constituted Saturday Sept. 13, 1817 and assumed the title of Big Cedar Grove Church. In May 1819 they decided to build a meeting house.

Job Stout and William Hetrick each deeded one acre of land for the church and burying ground. The first meetings of this church were held at the home of Job and Rhoda Stout (daughter of Abner Howell). The first church was a log cabin, in 1824 they agreed to finish the walls with wood and clay.

In May 1835 they began talking of a better church building and decided to make it of brick. Bricks were made near the site. The money for it was raised by subscription. They bought a stove in October, and in December 1837 the first service was held in this building. According to the records 214 different persons helped pay for the church.

A division occurred in the membership from 1869 to 1871 on the mission subject. In April 1870 the members found the church doors barred, bolted, and locked and held their meetings in the church yard and grove until November 1870 when they met at the residence of Deacon Samuel Goudie (son of James B. Goudie Jr.) and did so for the next seven meetings. The matter went to court, where a settlement was made dividing the time between the two factions. One group was given the first and third Sundays, the other group meeting the second and fourth Sundays. Each faction was to pay half the expenses of keeping the church in repair. Each was to furnish their own wood for fuel and lights.

The history of the burying ground as they always called it, was all the time connected with the business of the church. It is not known sure who was first buried here, for so many graves have no mark, but the oldest inscription on a tombstone is of John Hetrick, a child who died in 1820.

The Big Cedar Grove Cemetery Association was formed April 1899. In 1901 the church transferred all her interest in the graveyard to that association. This church was disbanded, September 12, 1959. The cemetery is still active today and the church building is now maintained by the Big Cedar Cemetery Association.
