= Oldenburg Academy of the Immaculate Conception =

Oldenburg Academy of the Immaculate Conception College Preparatory School of the Fine Arts

Location
- 1 Twister Circle; Oldenburg, Indiana 47036; United States; 39.3423°N 85.2009°W

Information
- Type: Private, secondary school
- Religious affiliations: Roman Catholic, Franciscan Sisters of St. Francis
- Established: 1852; 174 years ago
- President: Annette Hunger
- Principal: Angela Parmer
- Grades: 9–12
- Color
- Nickname: Twisters
- Accreditation: North Central Association of Colleges and Schools
- Website: www.oldenburgacademy.org

Oldenburg Academy of the Immaculate Conception is a private Catholic high school in Oldenburg, Indiana. The Alma Mater is "virtue, honor, and education."

== History ==
The school was founded in 1851 by the Sisters of St. Francis and Mother Teresa Hackelmeier. Oldenburg Academy received its commission as a high school in 1910. By the 1940s, the school stopped including elementary level students, becoming a high school only. In 1994, Oldenburg Academy incorporated. Currently, the school is controlled by a board of trustees rather than the original owners, the Sisters of St. Francis. The boarding program ended at the end of the 1998–1999 school year and male students were admitted from the autumn semester of 2000 onward. In 2020, the academy constructed a new athletic facility named the Hillenbrand Family Feldhaus.

== Enrollment ==
In 1986, the enrollment reached 117 students. The current enrollment is 228 students.
