= Saint Peter, Indiana =

- Unincorporated community
- Location within Indiana Location within the United States
- Coordinates: 39°19′18″N 85°01′54″W
- Country: United States
- State: Indiana
- County: Franklin
- Township: Highland
- Elevation: 968 ft (295 m)
- ZIP code: 47012
- FIPS code: 18-67230
- GNIS feature ID: 442794

Saint Peter is an unincorporated community in Highland Township, Franklin County, Indiana.

== History ==
Saint Peter was laid out in 1853. The community was originally built up chiefly by Germans, who established a large Catholic church there. A post office was established at Saint Peter in 1849, and remained in operation until 1906.
