= Cincinnati and Whitewater Canal Tunnel =

- U.S. National Register of Historic Places
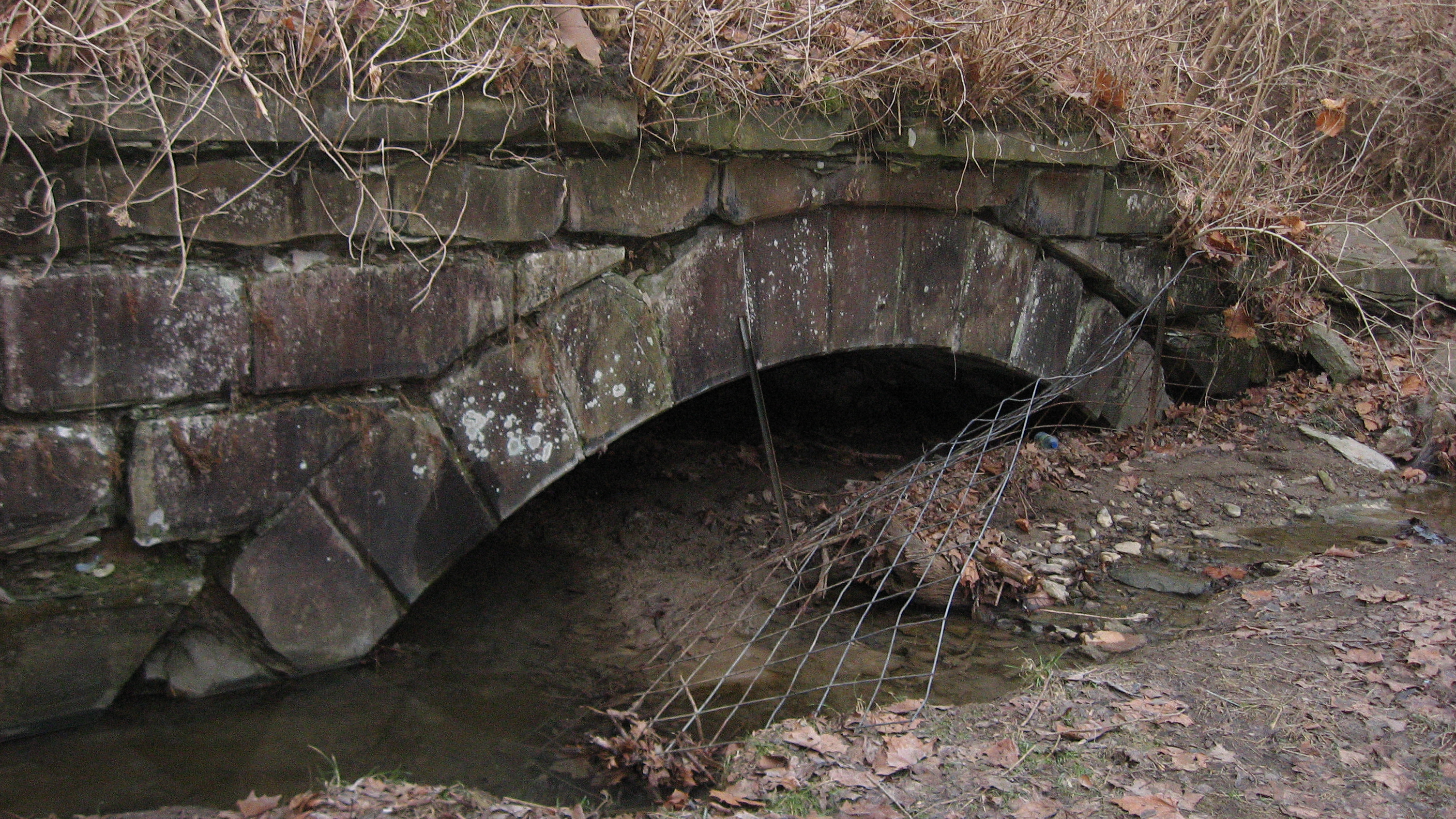
- Closeup of the tunnel's northern end

- Location within Ohio Location within the United States
- Location: Parallel to Miami Avenue at the Wamsley Avenue junction, Cleves, Ohio
- Coordinates: 39°9′18″N 84°44′58″W
- Area: 1.3 acres (0.53 ha)
- Built: 1837
- Architect: Darius Lapham; S. and H. Howard and Company
- Architectural style: Brick lined canal tunnel
- NRHP reference No.: 01000562
- Added to NRHP: May 25, 2001

The Cincinnati and Whitewater Canal Tunnel is a historic abandoned canal tunnel in the southwestern corner of the U.S. state of Ohio. Located within the village of Cleves near Cincinnati, it was constructed in 1837 as part of the Whitewater Canal system. Since the canal's closure, it has largely been forgotten, but it has been designated a historic site.

After Indiana began building the Whitewater Canal in the 1830s, Ohio businessmen urged the construction of an extension from the canal to Cincinnati. The resulting Cincinnati and Whitewater Canal was completed in 1843, including a canal tunnel near the village of North Bend, which was finished six years before the canal opened for business. This tunnel was needed because of a steep ridgeline on the village's northern side, separating it from Cleves, on land owned by retired war hero William Henry Harrison, who as one of the canal's proponents was happy to sell land for its right-of-way and to supply wood and bricks for the tunnel. After his ascension to the presidency and sudden death, Harrison was buried atop the ridgeline near the tunnel's southern portal.

Lined with brick, the tunnel includes ashlar stonework portals with wing walls. Upon completion, the tunnel was 0.3 miles (0.48 km) long, and there was 22 feet (6.7 m) between the ceiling and the underwater bottom of the canal. Unusually, the tunnel included room for a towpath instead of requiring the use of leggers, but the typical canal boat nevertheless relied on manpower while allowing the beasts of burden to climb the hill. As the state's first tunnel of its type, the Cincinnati and Whitewater Canal Tunnel has suffered two separate collapse incidents. The first occurred during the construction process, and six workmen died, while another segment caved in during the 1950s during a project to improve the portion of U.S. Route 50 that travels over the tunnel.

Despite the efforts spent on building the Whitewater Canal, it was abandoned in 1856 after numerous floods had destroyed much of its length. This resulted in the abandonment of the canal tunnel, a period of stagnation that ended in 1863 when a railroad company began a twenty-five-year period of using it as an ordinary rail tunnel. Since the rail line was rerouted in 1888, the tunnel has become completely unusable, having silted up almost all the way to the ceiling. However, the tunnel has not been completely forgotten; the Ohio Historical Society and a group of private organizations placed a historical marker by the tunnel's northern portal in 2000, and it was listed on the National Register of Historic Places in mid-2001. Its historic significance derives from its rarity: only a handful of canal tunnels were ever built in the United States.
