= South Gate, Indiana =

Unincorporated community in Indiana, U.S.

Coordinates: 39°19′16″N 84°57′24″W

South Gate is an unincorporated community in Highland Township, Franklin County, Indiana, USA.

== History ==
South Gate was platted in 1850 by Richard Wood. The South Gate post office was discontinued in 1941.
