= Metamora Historic District =

Historic district in Indiana, United States

- U.S. National Register of Historic Places
- U.S. Historic district
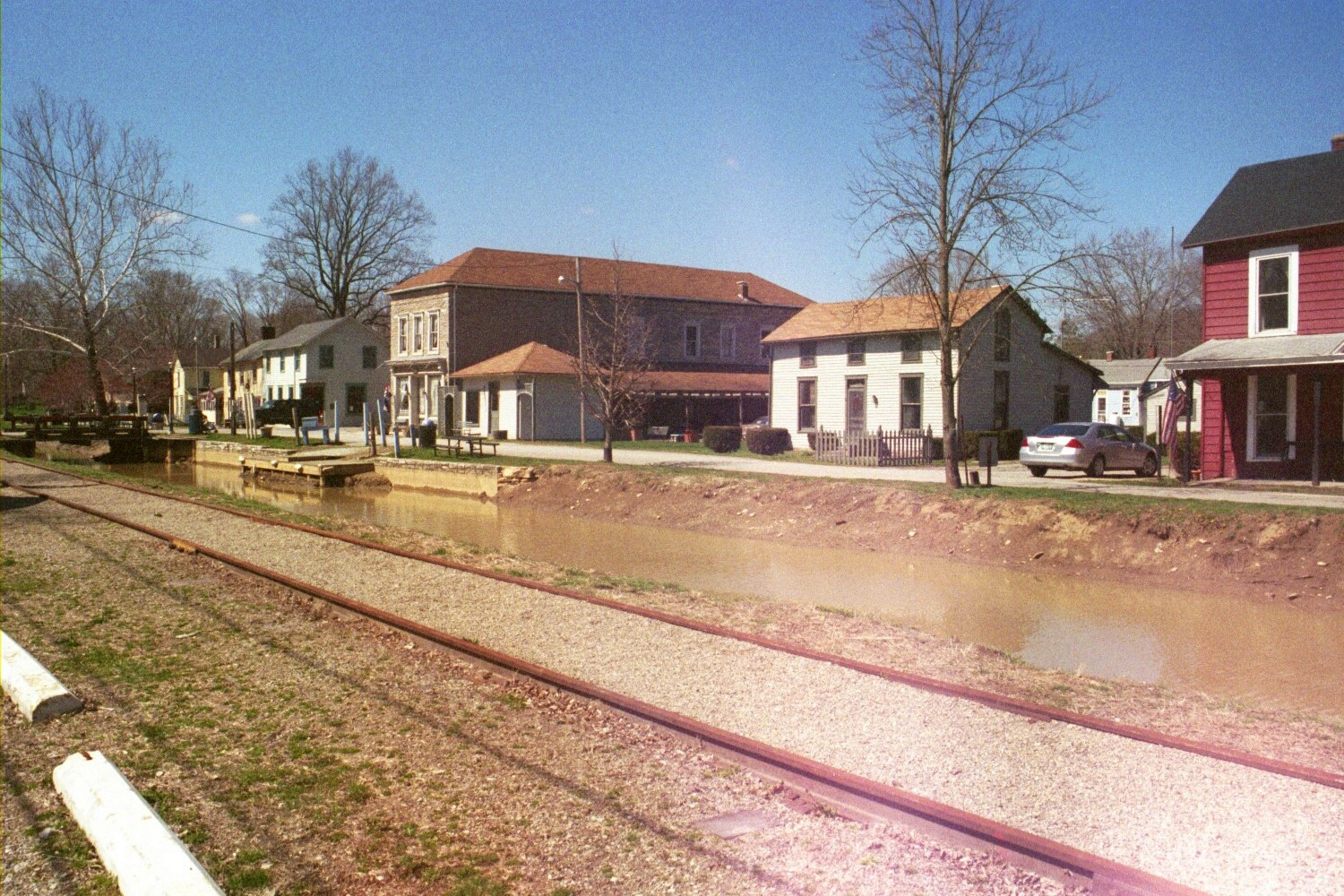
- Metamora Historic District, April 2006

- Location within Indiana Location within the United States
- Location: Roughly bounded by US 52, Columbia St., the Whitewater Canal, Duck Cr., Mount St. and Main St., Metamora, Indiana
- Coordinates: 39°26′49″N 85°08′01″W
- Area: 34 acres (14 ha)
- Architectural style: Greek Revival, Italianate, Gothic Revival
- NRHP reference No.: 92001646
- Added to NRHP: December 7, 1992

Metamora Historic District is a national historic district located at Metamora, Indiana. The district encompasses 115 contributing buildings and 10 contributing structures in the central business district and surrounding residential sections of the village of Metamora. It developed between about 1838 and 1923, and includes notable examples of Italianate, Gothic Revival, and Greek Revival style architecture. Located in the district is the Duck Creek Aqueduct. Notable contributing buildings include the Odd Fellows Building (1853), Gordon Hall Building, Jonathan Banes House, Metamora Masonic Hall (c. 1875), Martindale House (1838), Metamora Christian Church (1871), Redmen Hall Building (c. 1870), and Farmers Bank of Metamora (1923).

It was listed on the National Register of Historic Places in 1992.
