= Stockheughter Covered Bridge =

- U.S. National Register of Historic Places
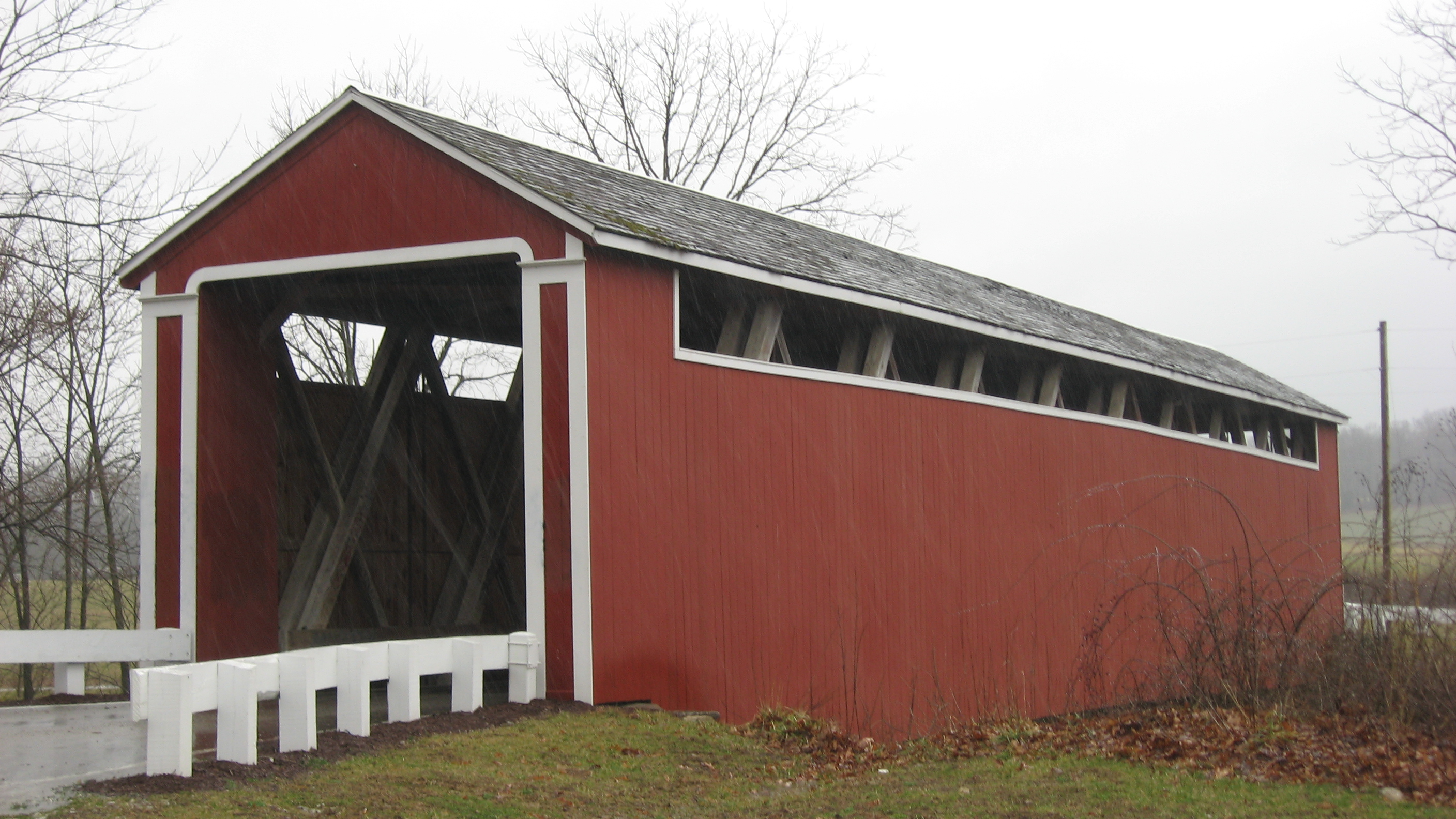
- Stockheughter Covered Bridge, March 2012

- Location within Indiana Location within the United States
- Location: 27046 Enochsburg Rd., northwest of Batesville, Ray Township, Franklin County, Indiana
- Coordinates: 39°19′59″N 85°16′51″W
- Area: less than one acre
- Built: 1891
- Built by: George Hotel & Company
- Architectural style: Howe Truss Covered Bridge
- NRHP reference No.: 02000198
- Added to NRHP: March 20, 2002

Stockheughter Covered Bridge, also known as Enochsburg Covered Bridge and County Bridge number 73, is a historic Howe Truss covered bridge located in Ray Township, Franklin County, Indiana. The bridge was built in 1891, and measures 101 feet, 10 inches, long, 13 feet high, and 13 feet wide. It has a gable roof and the exterior is clad in board and natten siding.

It was listed on the National Register of Historic Places in 2002.
