= Oldenburg Historic District =

Historic district in Indiana, United States

- U.S. National Register of Historic Places
- U.S. Historic district
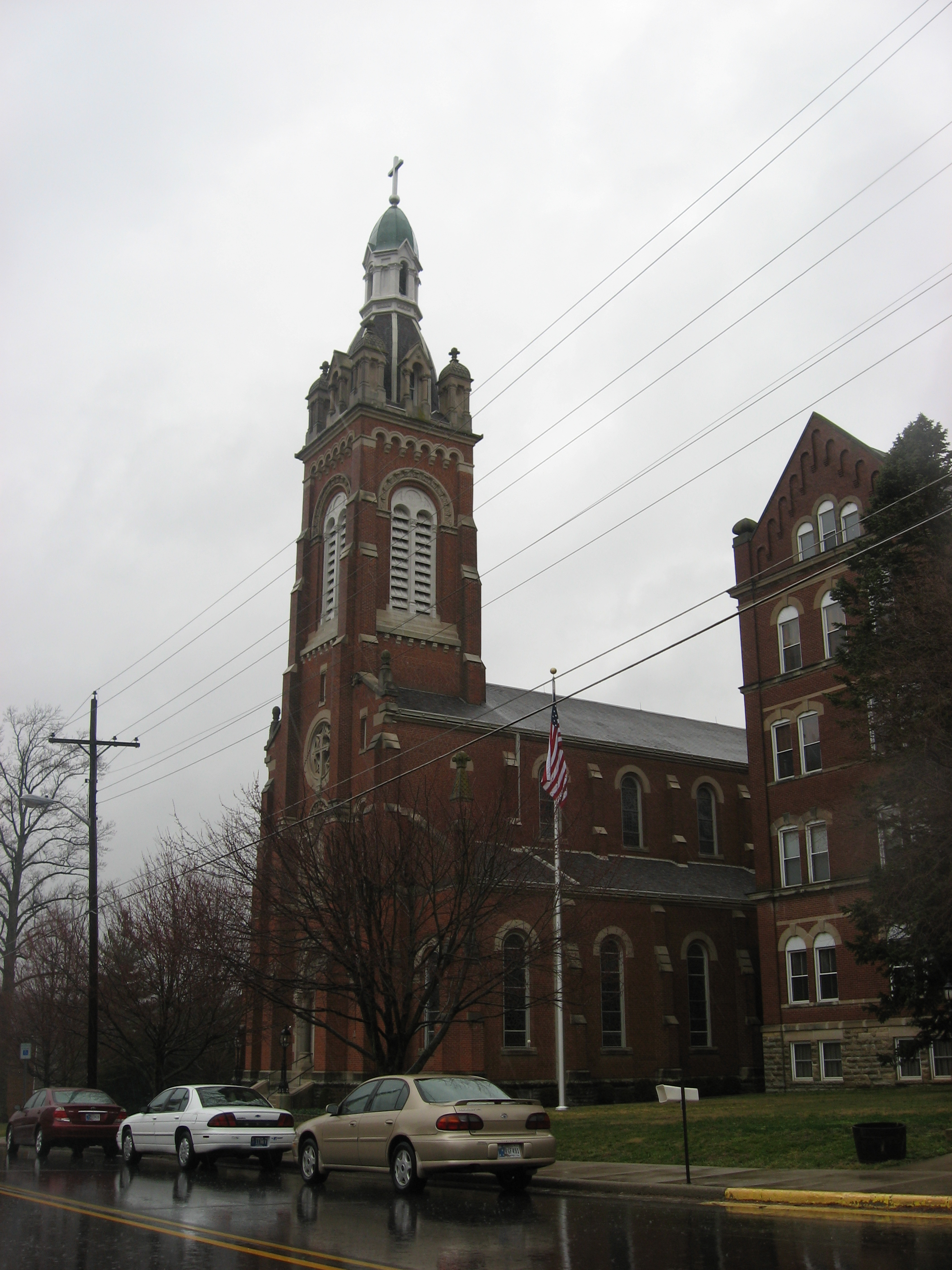
- Chapel of the Convent of the Sisters of Saint Francis, March 2012

- Location within Indiana Location within the United States
- Location: Bounded roughly by Sycamore, church land woods, Indiana, and Water Sts., and Gehring Farm, Oldenburg, Indiana and Ray Township, Franklin County, Indiana
- Coordinates: 39°20′27″N 85°12′09″W
- Area: 103 acres (42 ha)
- Built: 1837
- Architect: Multiple
- Architectural style: Mixed (more Than 2 Styles From Different Periods)
- NRHP reference No.: 83000031
- Added to NRHP: March 3, 1983

Oldenburg Historic District is a national historic district located at Oldenburg and Ray Township, Franklin County, Indiana. The district encompasses 106 contributing buildings, 2 contributing sites, and 6 contributing structures in the central business district and surrounding residential sections of Oldenburg. It developed between about 1837 and 1930, and includes a variety of popular architectural styles. Notable contributing buildings include the Town Hall (1878), Holy Family Church (1862), First Corpus Christi Church, Second Corpus Christi Church, Cemetery Chapel (c. 1880), Convent Chapel (1889–1901), Convent of the Immaculate Conception (1889–1901), Franciscan Monastery (1894), Stone Church (1846–1848), Waechter's Cradle Shop (1845), Oldenburg Lumber Company (c. 1885), Brockman House (c. 1890), George Holtel House (c. 1865), Fischer Tavern (c. 1850), Burdick Building, Hackman Store (1861–1862), Roell Farm House (c. 1865), and Kellerman House (c. 1860, 1902).

It was listed on the National Register of Historic Places in 1983.
