= Ray Township, Franklin County, Indiana =

Ray Township
- Township
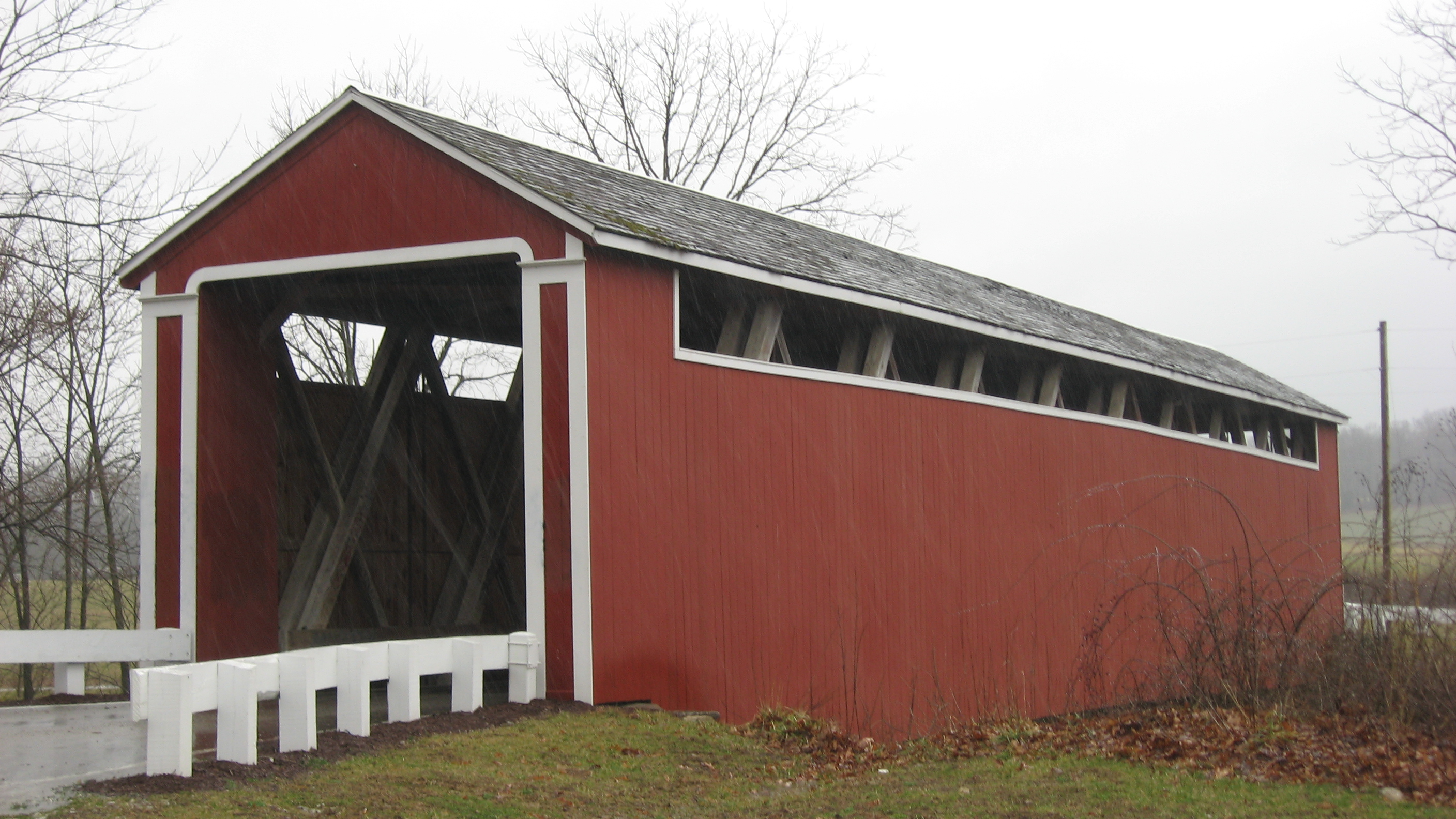
- Stockheughter Covered Bridge

- Location of Ray Township in Franklin County
- Coordinates: 39°19′40″N 85°14′30″W
- Country: United States
- State: Indiana
- County: Franklin

Government
  - Type: Indiana township

Area
  - Total: 39.69 sq mi (102.8 km^{2})
  - Land: 39.61 sq mi (102.6 km^{2})
  - Water: 0.08 sq mi (0.21 km^{2})
- Elevation: 958 ft (292 m)

Population (2020)
  - Total: 4,314
  - Density: 108.9/sq mi (42.05/km^{2})
- FIPS code: 18-63126
- GNIS feature ID: 453782

Ray Township is one of thirteen townships in Franklin County, Indiana. As of the 2020 census, its population was 4,314, up from 4,021 at 2010.

Historical population
Census	Pop.	Note	%±
1890	2,244		—
1900	2,122		−5.4%
1910	2,017		−4.9%
1920	1,654		−18.0%
1930	1,613		−2.5%
1940	1,593		−1.2%
1950	1,700		6.7%
1960	2,050		20.6%
1970	2,420		18.0%
1980	2,999		23.9%
1990	3,098		3.3%
2000	3,690		19.1%
2010	4,021		9.0%
2020	4,314		7.3%
Source: US Decennial Census

== History ==
Ray Township is named for James B. Ray, fourth Governor of Indiana.

The Oldenburg Historic District and Stockheughter Covered Bridge are listed on the National Register of Historic Places.

== Geography ==
According to the 2010 census, the township has a total area of 39.69 square miles (102.8 km^{2}), of which 39.61 square miles (102.6 km^{2}) (or 99.80%) is land and 0.08 square miles (0.21 km^{2}) (or 0.20%) is water.

=== Cities and towns ===
- Batesville (north quarter)
- Oldenburg

=== Unincorporated towns ===
- Hamburg
- Huntersville

(This list is based on USGS data and may include former settlements.)

=== Adjacent townships ===
- Salt Creek Township (north)
- Butler Township (east)
- Adams Township, Ripley County (southeast)
- Laughery Township, Ripley County (south)
- Salt Creek Township, Decatur County (west)
- Fugit Township, Decatur County (northwest)

=== Major highways ===
- Interstate 74
- Indiana State Road 46
- Indiana State Road 229

=== Cemeteries ===
The township contains one cemetery, Holy Family.

== Education ==
Ray Township residents may obtain a free library card from the Batesville Memorial Public Library in Batesville.
