= Highland Township, Franklin County, Indiana =

Highland Township
- Township
- Location of Highland Township in Franklin County
- Coordinates: 39°20′22″N 84°59′48″W
- Country: United States
- State: Indiana
- County: Franklin

Government
  - Type: Indiana township

Area
  - Total: 30.5 sq mi (79 km^{2})
  - Land: 30.33 sq mi (78.6 km^{2})
  - Water: 0.18 sq mi (0.47 km^{2})
- Elevation: 958 ft (292 m)

Population (2020)
  - Total: 1,428
  - Density: 47.08/sq mi (18.18/km^{2})
- FIPS code: 18-33448
- GNIS feature ID: 453412

Highland Township is one of thirteen townships in Franklin County, Indiana. As of the 2020 census, its population was 1,428, up from 1,412 at 2010.

Historical population
Census	Pop.	Note	%±
1890	1,509		—
1900	1,317		−12.7%
1910	1,161		−11.8%
1920	1,238		6.6%
1930	1,080		−12.8%
1940	1,046		−3.1%
1950	1,004		−4.0%
1960	1,050		4.6%
1970	1,083		3.1%
1980	1,273		17.5%
1990	1,226		−3.7%
2000	1,335		8.9%
2010	1,412		5.8%
2020	1,428		1.1%
Source: US Decennial Census

== History ==
Highland Township was established in 1821.

The Cedar Grove Bridge was listed on the National Register of Historic Places in 2014.

== Geography ==
According to the 2010 census, the township has a total area of 30.5 square miles (79 km^{2}), of which 30.33 square miles (78.6 km^{2}) (or 99.44%) is land and 0.18 square miles (0.47 km^{2}) (or 0.59%) is water.

=== Cities and towns ===
- Cedar Grove

=== Unincorporated towns ===
- Highland Center
- Klemmes Corner
- Saint Peter
- South Gate

(This list is based on USGS data and may include former settlements.)

=== Adjacent townships ===
- Brookville Township (north)
- Whitewater Township (east)
- Kelso Township, Dearborn County (southeast)
- Logan Township, Dearborn County (southeast)
- Adams Township, Ripley County (southwest)
- Jackson Township, Dearborn County (southwest)
- Butler Township (west)

=== Major highways ===
- U.S. Route 52
- Indiana State Road 1

=== Cemeteries ===
The township contains one cemetery, South Gate.
