= Indiana Bridge Company =

The Indiana Bridge Company is the oldest manufacturer in Muncie, Indiana. Established in May 1886 in Indianapolis, Indiana, the company has a rich history of building truss bridges that spans not only Indiana but throughout parts of the United States. On November of the same year, the company moved from Indianapolis to Muncie where it would remain until today.

== History ==
On May 17, 1886, shortly after the discovery of natural gas, Theodore F. Rose and associates established the Indiana Bridge Company, with a capital stock of $30,000. Located in Indianapolis, Indiana the company built truss bridges. On November 12 of the same year, the company was moved from Indianapolis to Muncie, Indiana where the gas boom was just beginning. By March 1887, they erected their first brick and stone building.

C.M. Kimbrough became president of the Indiana Bridge Company on May 25, 1888. Kimbrough led the expansion of the company, and in 1904 the company upgraded its facilities at its present-day site. During World War I, the company participated in the war mobilization effort, producing steel for the United States and its allies. After the end of the war, the company continued to prosper until the beginning of the Great Depression in 1929. In 1932, C.M. Kimbrough died, and his son J. Lloyd Kimbrough became president, serving until 1937. Upon his death, the company elected J. Lloyd's brother, Frank H. Kimbrough as president of the company. With the beginning of World War II, the Indiana Bridge Company again assisted the war effort with steel production from 1939 to 1945. In 1946, Frank H. Kimbrough died, and the following year on August 6, 1947, his brother Hal C. Kimbrough decided to sell the company. Taylor and Gaskin, Inc.’s purchase of the Indiana Bridge Company ended the company's long history of Kimbrough leadership.

Under new management, the Indiana Bridge Company had a lot of ups and downs as a result of the economy. The company continued to operate from 1947 to 1962, when it closed its doors. Muncie was not ready to see the company close, and in 1963 a group of local investors put capital back into the business and reopened its doors. In 1971, the Indiana Bridge Company was sold to and Alabama firm, and two years later was sold again to Debron. Bristol Steel purchased the company from Debron in 1978, and continued operating it until the plant closed in 1982 due to economic hardships. The plant was not closed for long, when two years later in 1984 it reopened its doors. The Indiana Bridge Company still operates today in Muncie, Indiana manufacturing structural steel.

A collection of records of Indiana Bridge Company including drawings, photographs, and documents from 1886 to 1981 is available digitally through the Digital Media Repository at Ball State University.

== Works ==
- Breed Power Plant, Muncie, Indiana, circa 1960s
- Christ Hospital, Cincinnati, Ohio
- Chrysler Corporation Transfer Bridge, Detroit, Michigan, 1950
