= Highland Center, Indiana =

- Unincorporated community
- Location within Indiana Location within the United States
- Coordinates: 39°19′18″N 85°00′14″W
- Country: United States
- State: Indiana
- County: Franklin
- Township: Highland
- Elevation: 984 ft (300 m)
- ZIP code: 47012
- FIPS code: 18-33538
- GNIS feature ID: 436158

Highland Center is an unincorporated community in Highland Township, Franklin County, Indiana.

== History ==
In 1915, Highland Center contained a general store, a blacksmith, and a small saloon.
