= Cedar Grove, Indiana =

- Town
- Town of Cedar Grove
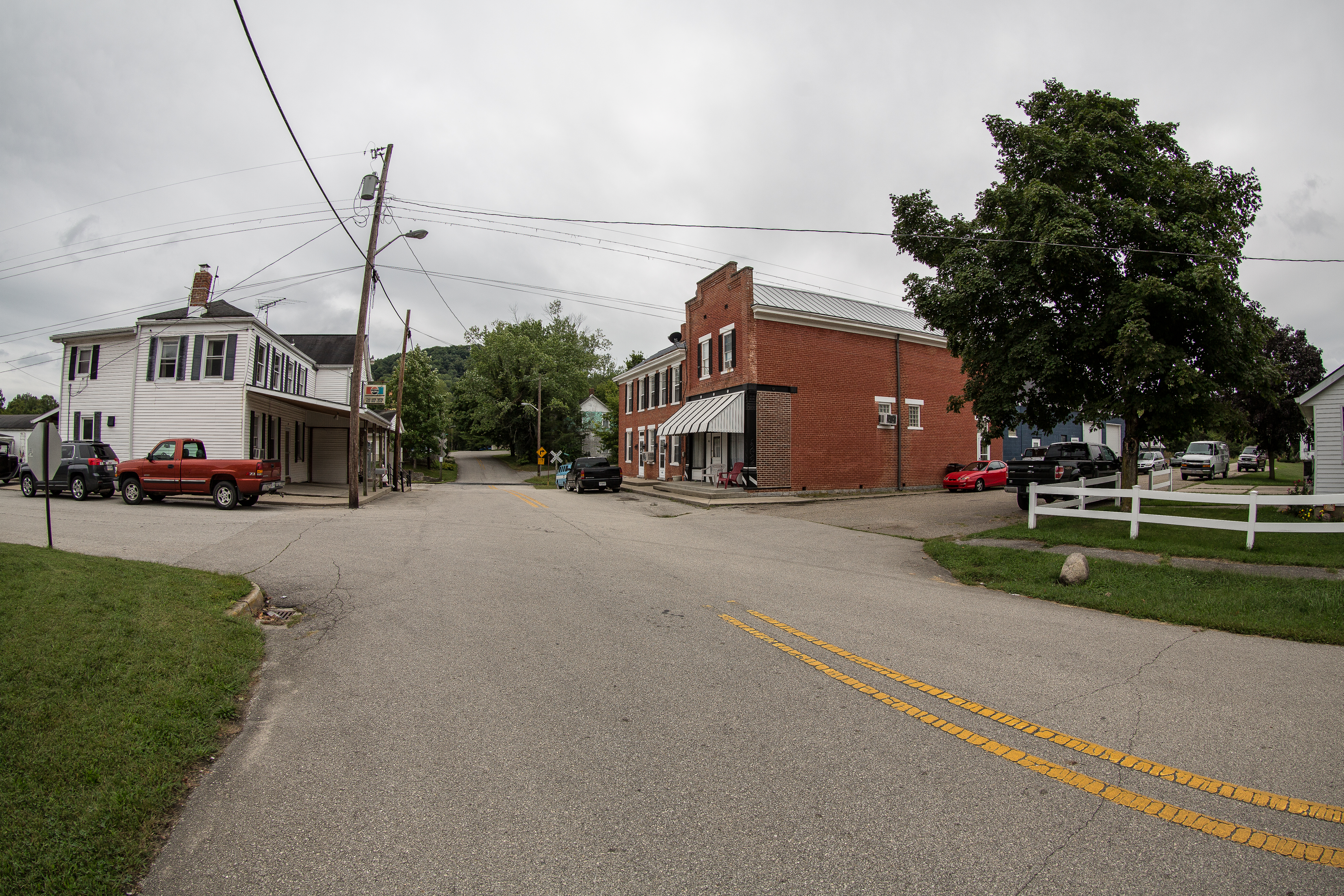

- Location of Cedar Grove in Franklin County, Indiana.
- Coordinates: 39°21′22″N 84°56′14″W
- Country: United States
- State: Indiana
- County: Franklin
- Township: Highland

Area
  - Total: 0.16 sq mi (0.41 km^{2})
  - Land: 0.15 sq mi (0.39 km^{2})
  - Water: 0.0077 sq mi (0.02 km^{2})
- Elevation: 597 ft (182 m)

Population (2020)
  - Total: 150
  - Density: 994.1/sq mi (383.83/km^{2})
- Time zone: UTC-5 (EST)
  - Summer (DST): UTC-5 (EST)
- ZIP code: 47016
- Area code: 765
- FIPS code: 18-11044
- GNIS feature ID: 2396633

Cedar Grove is a town in Highland Township, Franklin County, Indiana, United States. As of the 2020 census, Cedar Grove had a population of 150.

== History ==
Cedar Grove, originally known as Rochester, was platted in 1837 by John Ward. Ward built a large gristmill there. It was incorporated as a town in 1907.

The Cedar Grove Bridge was listed on the National Register of Historic Places in 2014.

== Geography ==
According to the 2010 census, Cedar Grove has a total area of 0.15 square miles (0.39 km^{2}), all land.

== Demographics ==
Historical population
Census	Pop.	Note	%±
1880	219		—
1910	185		—
1920	200		8.1%
1930	221		10.5%
1940	204		−7.7%
1950	193		−5.4%
1960	232		20.2%
1970	248		6.9%
1980	217		−12.5%
1990	246		13.4%
2000	185		−24.8%
2010	156		−15.7%
2020	150		−3.8%
U.S. Decennial Census

=== 2010 census ===
As of the census of 2010, there were 156 people, 75 households, and 47 families living in the town. The population density was 1,040.0 inhabitants per square mile (401.5/km^{2}). There were 84 housing units at an average density of 560.0 per square mile (216.2/km^{2}). The racial makeup of the town was 98.7% White and 1.3% from two or more races.

There were 75 households, of which 25.3% had children under the age of 18 living with them, 44.0% were married couples living together, 16.0% had a female householder with no husband present, 2.7% had a male householder with no wife present, and 37.3% were non-families. 33.3% of all households were made up of individuals, and 9.4% had someone living alone who was 65 years of age or older. The average household size was 2.08 and the average family size was 2.55.

The median age in the town was 44.5 years. 19.2% of residents were under the age of 18; 7.7% were between the ages of 18 and 24; 23.7% were from 25 to 44; 35.2% were from 45 to 64; and 14.1% were 65 years of age or older. The gender makeup of the town was 47.4% male and 52.6% female.

=== 2000 census ===
As of the census of 2000, there were 185 people, 75 households, and 54 families living in the town. The population density was 1,240.3 inhabitants per square mile (478.9/km^{2}). There were 79 housing units at an average density of 529.7 per square mile (204.5/km^{2}). The racial makeup of the town was 99.46% White, and 0.54% from two or more races.

There were 75 households, out of which 30.7% had children under the age of 18 living with them, 50.7% were married couples living together, 17.3% had a female householder with no husband present, and 28.0% were non-families. 26.7% of all households were made up of individuals, and 12.0% had someone living alone who was 65 years of age or older. The average household size was 2.47 and the average family size was 2.98.

In the town, the population was spread out, with 23.2% under the age of 18, 9.7% from 18 to 24, 27.0% from 25 to 44, 25.9% from 45 to 64, and 14.1% who were 65 years of age or older. The median age was 36 years. For every 100 females, there were 105.6 males. For every 100 females age 18 and over, there were 100.0 males.

The median income for a household in the town was $40,833, and the median income for a family was $45,625. Males had a median income of $36,094 versus $24,375 for females. The per capita income for the town was $23,483. About 5.3% of families and 6.6% of the population were below the poverty line, including 11.1% of those under the age of eighteen and none of those 65 or over.
