= Old Franklin United Brethren Church =

Historic church in Indiana, United States

- U.S. National Register of Historic Places
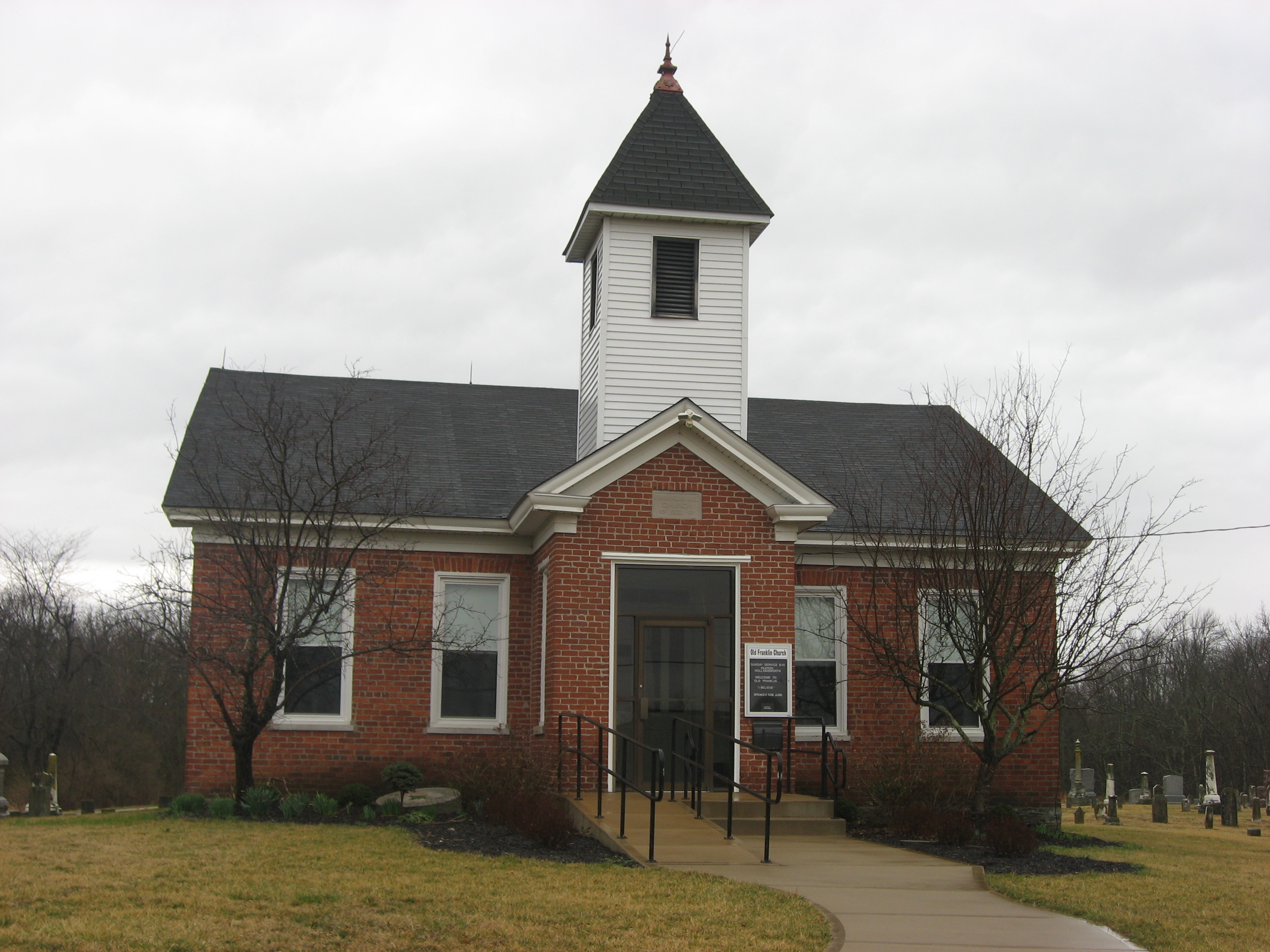
- Old Franklin United Brethren Church, March 2012

- Location within Indiana Location within the United States
- Location: Junction of Franklin Church Rd. and State Road 101, 0.5 miles north of Fox Run Rd. and northeast of Brookeville, Fairfield Township, Franklin County, Indiana
- Coordinates: 39°30′22″N 84°56′56″W
- Area: 2.7 acres (1.1 ha)
- Built: 1831
- Built by: Reed, Joseph
- Architectural style: Federal
- NRHP reference No.: 95000201
- Added to NRHP: March 3, 1995

Old Franklin United Brethren Church, now known as Old Franklin Community Christian Church, is a historic United Brethren church located at Fairfield Township, Franklin County, Indiana. It was built in 1831, and is a one-story, five-bay, Federal style brick building. It has a central cross gable at the vestibule topped by a bell tower and steeple added in 1910. Surrounding the church on three sides is a cemetery with gravestones dating to the 1830s and 1840s.

It was listed on the National Register of Historic Places in 1995.
