= Metamora, Indiana =

- Census-designated place
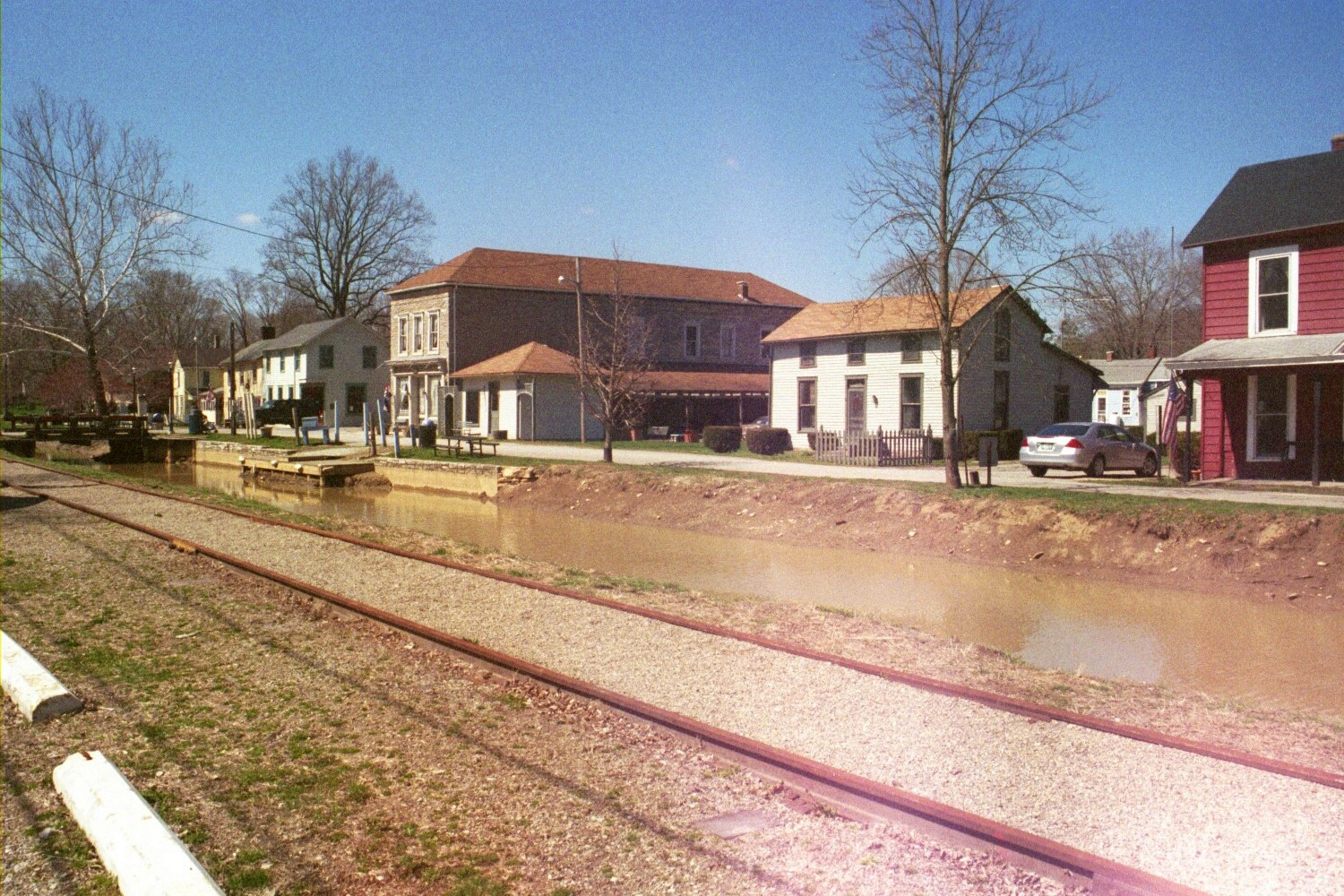
- Metamora, with railroad and canal in the foreground

- Location of Metamora in Franklin County, Indiana.

- Location within Indiana
- Coordinates: 39°26′45″N 85°07′44″W
- Country: United States
- State: Indiana
- County: Franklin
- Township: Metamora

Area
  - Total: 0.34 sq mi (0.87 km^{2})
  - Land: 0.34 sq mi (0.87 km^{2})
  - Water: 0 sq mi (0.00 km^{2})
- Elevation: 715 ft (218 m)

Population (2020)
  - Total: 207
  - Density: 616.4/sq mi (238.01/km^{2})
- ZIP code: 47030
- FIPS code: 18-48563
- GNIS feature ID: 2587022

Metamora is an unincorporated community and census-designated place in Metamora Township, Franklin County, Indiana. The town was once a stop along the Whitewater Canal and is now primarily dependent on tourism. As of the 2020 census, Metamora had a population of 207.

== History ==
Metamora was platted in 1838. The community derives its name from the play Metamora; or, The Last of the Wampanoags by John Augustus Stone.

The Whitewater Canal only carried boats from 1839 to 1865, but the canal was maintained to supply hydraulic power until 1936. The canal was the center of industrial districts in Metamora and Brookville, 8 miles (13 km) to the east. At one time there were water-powered mills for processing cotton, grinding flour and making paper. Metamora is the location of Indiana's oldest and still operating grist mill. Metamora is also home to the only existing wooden aqueduct in the United States (the Duck Creek Aqueduct), with a historical review of the canal history which fueled the southeastern Indiana economy until its displacement by the railroad. The canal is named after the nearby Whitewater River.

The Metamora Historic District and Whitewater Canal Historic District are listed on the National Register of Historic Places.

== Geography ==
Metamora is located in the valley of the Whitewater River in southeastern Indiana. It is situated on U.S. Route 52, 37 miles (60 km) northwest of Cincinnati, Ohio, and 59 miles (95 km) southeast of Indianapolis.

According to the U.S. Census Bureau, the CDP has a total area of 0.35 square miles (0.9 km^{2}), all land.

== Demographics ==
Historical population
Census	Pop.	Note	%±
2020	207		—
U.S. Decennial Census

== Notable people ==
- Tom Alley (1889–1953), racing driver
