= Whitewater Canal =

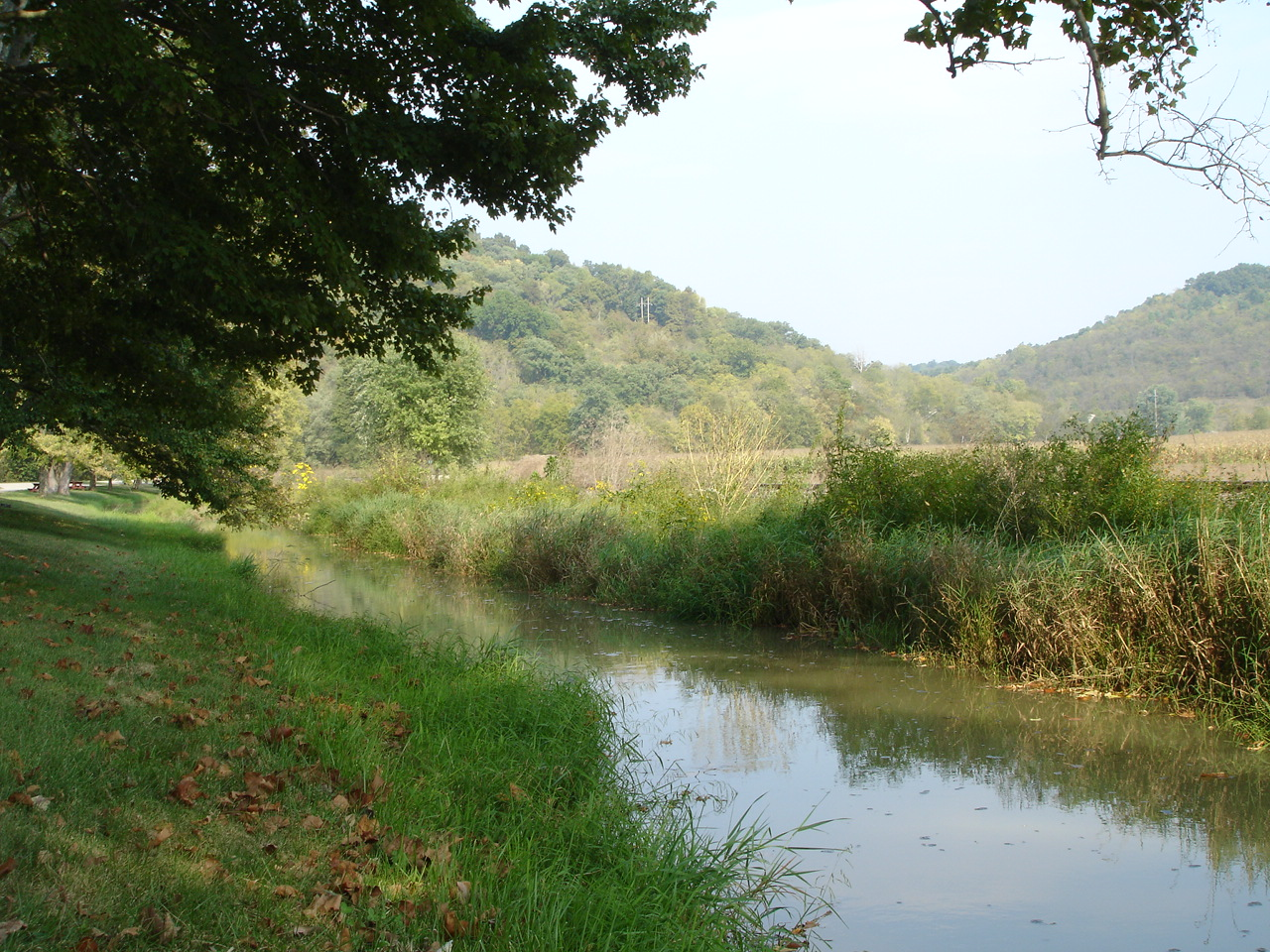
Whitewater Canal (Metamora, Indiana)

The Whitewater Canal, which was built between 1836 (190 years ago) and 1847 (179 years ago), spanned a distance of 76 miles (122 km) and stretched from Lawrenceburg, Indiana on the Ohio River to Hagerstown, Indiana near the West Fork of the White River.

== History ==
=== Birth of a canal ===
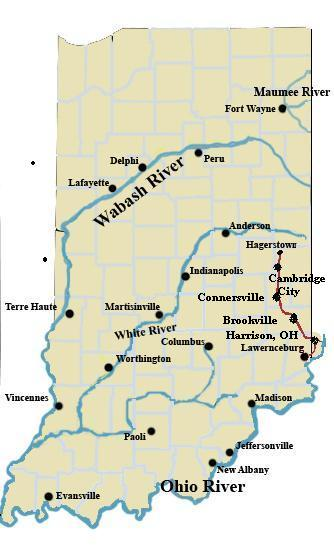
A map showing the course of the Whitewater Canal

As with most transportation improvements during the early nineteenth century, industry paved the way within individual states. After successful canal development projects further east in the United States, it was not long until canals were dug across the Midwest. The opening of the Erie Canal in 1825 paved the way for improvement projects across the United States and changed the course of American transportation history. The Erie Canal was an immediate financial success. This set the precedent for future canals and proved canals could provide a viable contribution to local economies.

There was the need for a high-speed transportation system that could link the Whitewater Valley to the Ohio River. Before the canal, farmers had to transport their goods and livestock to Cincinnati, Ohio on badly rutted and often impassable roads. The journey to Cincinnati could take several days.

In 1836 the Indiana State Legislature approved the Mammoth Internal Improvement Act, which allowed for the development of the Whitewater Canal and a host of other improvements throughout Indiana.

=== Construction ===
The Whitewater Canal was built based on an 1834 survey conducted by Charles Hutchens. The design called for a canal seventy six miles long starting at Nettle Creek near Hagerstown and following the river valley through Connersville, Brookville and into Harrison, Ohio, then back into Indiana to finish at Lawrenceburg. In the 76 miles (122 km) the canal dropped 491 feet (150 m). This a very ambitious route as it was quite steep and required the crossing of the Whitewater over an aqueduct at Laurel as well as several other streams of lesser size. The 491-foot (150 m) drop compares to the Erie Canal that dropped 500 feet (150 m) but did so in 300 miles (480 km). The Wabash & Erie Canal dropped 450 feet (140 m) in 460 miles (740 km) while the Chesapeake & Ohio dropped 538 feet (164 m) in 184 miles (296 km). That meant that the Whitewater descended 6.4 feet per mile compared to the Chesapeake & Ohio at 2.9 feet per mile, the Erie at 1.7 feet per mile and the Wabash & Erie at 1 foot per mile. The steepness became a problem whenever heavy rains came.

Because of the steep grade, the canal required 56 locks and seven dams.

The canal was started as a state project and ground was broken on September 13, 1836. The first boat arrived in Brookville from Lawrenceburg on June 8, 1839. Because of budget problems construction was suspended in August 1839 not to be resumed until 1842.

In 1842, the state of Indiana transferred its ownership in the canal to the White Water Valley Canal Company which was required to complete the canal to Cambridge City in five years. By 1843 boats were arriving in Laurel. 1845 saw the canal operating into Connersville. The canal company was running out of money and borrowed from Henry Valette of Cincinnati to finish the canal into Cambridge City from Connersville. From Cambridge City to Hagerstown the Canal was built by the Hagerstown Canal Company and was finished in 1847.

=== Canal decline ===
The Whitewater Canal was a short venture, but it left a lasting mark on the communities it traveled through. The canal development project was funded under the Act of 1836 and was allotted $1,400,000 to build the canal through the Whitewater Valley. This was a huge sum at the time and investors did not take out many loans due to the prediction that they stood to make considerable profit. It was the Mammoth Internal Improvement Act of 1836 that ended up straining the coffers of the State of Indiana. Indiana went bankrupt during the summer of 1839, and canal construction was halted until 1842.

In November 1847 the Whitewater Valley flooded and many sections of the canal were washed out. The section between Harrison and Lawrenceburg was never rebuilt. This effectively ended the canal era in Lawrenceburg after only eight years of service, and only a few months after the canal was finished to Hagerstown. It was ten months before the canal was again operational north of Harrison. Debt incurred to finance repairs in 1847 were a serious problem for the rest of the canals active history.

==== White Water Valley Canal Company ====
The White Water Valley Canal Company was granted a charter by the Indiana General Assembly of 1825–26. The company was set up after the State of Indiana could no longer afford to finish the Whitewater Canal system. The White Water Valley Canal Company finished the canal through Cambridge City, Indiana.

It constructed the Canal House at Connersville in 1842. The building was added to the National Register of Historic Places in 1973.

==== Hagerstown Canal Company ====
Hagerstown was supposed to be the northernmost terminus of the Whitewater Canal, but after the state went bankrupt, Hagerstown was forced to finance and construct its own canal to Cambridge City. The Hagerstown Canal Company completed an eight-mile (13 km) long canal between Hagerstown and Cambridge City in 1847.

==== Cincinnati And Whitewater Canal ====
A connecting canal built to reach Cincinnati was known as the Cincinnati and Whitewater Canal. This canal was built by Ohio interests and went from Harrison to Cincinnati. It was completed in 1843 and replaced Lawrenceburg as the end of the line after the 1847 November flood. This stretch of canal closed in 1862 and was used as a railroad right-of-way at that time. A canal tunnel constructed to obviate a ridgeline at Cleves still exists, although badly silted up.

== The Whitewater Canal today ==
- Whitewater Canal Historic District
- U.S. National Register of Historic Places
- U.S. Historic district
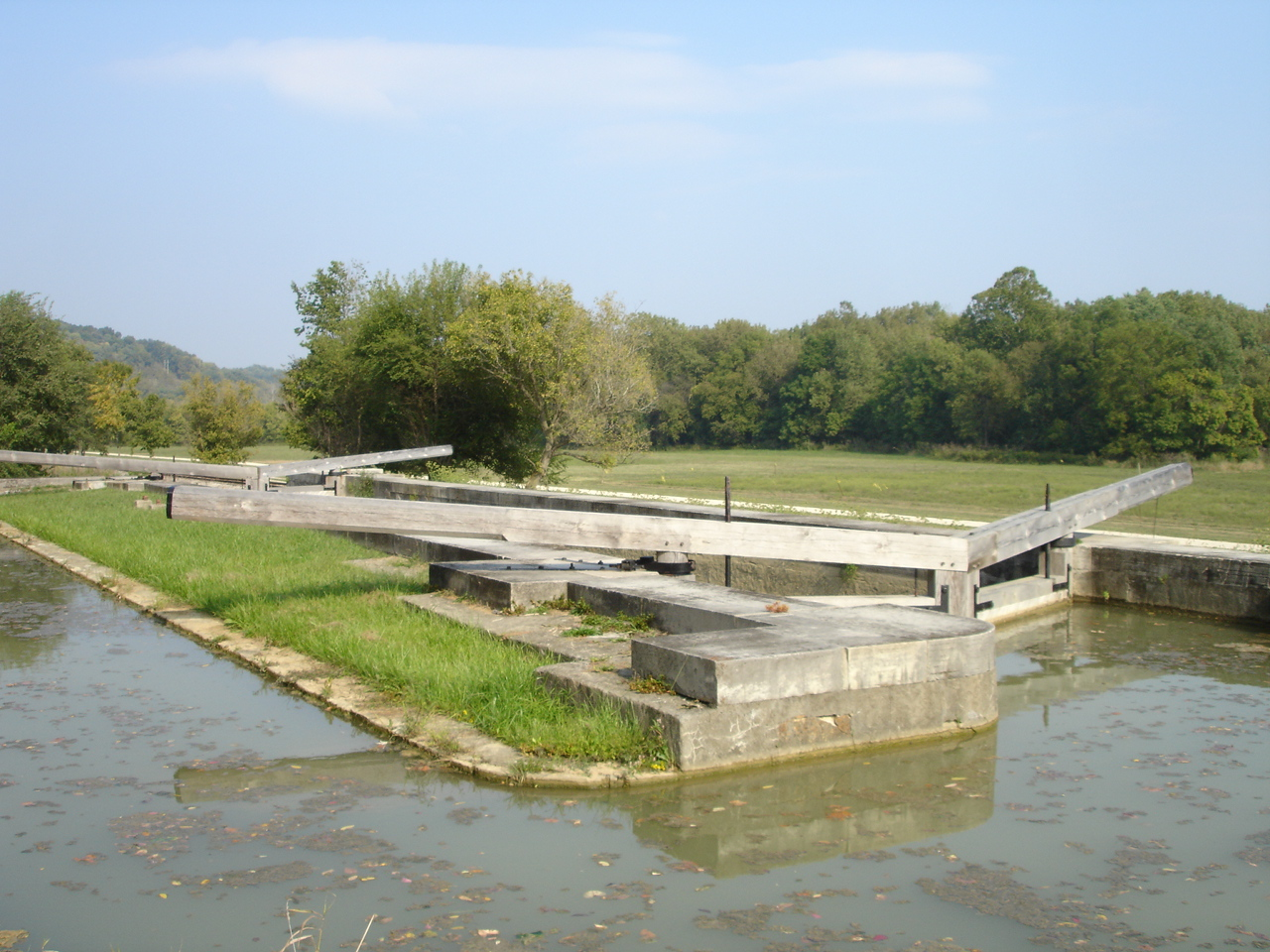
- Gordons Lock, September 2007

- Location within Indiana Location within the United States
- Location: From Laurel Feeder Dam to Brookville, Laurel Township, Metamora Township, Franklin County, Indiana, and Metamora, Indiana
- Coordinates: 39°27′33″N 85°06′34″W
- Area: 234 acres (95 ha)
- Built: 1836
- NRHP reference No.: 73000272
- Added to NRHP: June 13, 1973

Little is left of the Whitewater Canal today. Some towpath was bought by the Whitewater Valley Railroad Company and has been used in various train operations over the years. A section of the rail line is still in use as a tourist railroad. The Whitewater Valley Railroad operates between Connersville, Indiana and Metamora, Indiana. The remains of many of the canal locks on this section of the canal can still be seen as well as the diversion dam near Laurel, Indiana that was rebuilt in the 1940s and provides water for the restored canal section in Metamora as well as the mill. The restored grain mill in Metamora which runs on water provided by the canal shows that transportation was not the only use of the canal. Hydro power was in use for many decades after the canal was closed as a transportation route and even was used to generate electricity in Connersville in the early part of the 20th century.

The most visible area of the Whitewater Canal that exists today is in Metamora. This section from the Laurel Feeder Dam to Brookville was listed on listed on the National Register of Historic Places in 1973 as the Whitewater Canal Historic District. The district encompasses 1 contributing building and 31 contributing structures. They include the Metamora Roller Mill, Laurel Feeder Dam, Duck Creek Aqueduct, and Millville Lock. Here the Canal Era is recreated and tourists can stroll through a nineteenth-century town. There are museums, shopping, eateries, and you can even take a horse drawn ride on the canal.

=== Civil Engineering Landmark status ===
An aqueduct carries the canal over Duck Creek at Metamora. It is a twentieth-century reconstruction of the wooden aqueduct built in 1846 to replace an earlier one that was washed out by a flood, and was listed as a National Historic Civil Engineering Landmark by the American Society of Civil Engineers (ASCE) in 1992.

=== Cities along the canal ===
- Cincinnati, Ohio - by way of Cincinnati and Whitewater Canal and Ohio River
- Harrison, Ohio
- Lawrenceburg, Indiana
- Brookville, Indiana
- Metamora, Indiana
- Laurel, Indiana
- Connersville, Indiana
- Milton, Indiana
- Cambridge City, Indiana
- Hagerstown, Indiana

== Gallery ==
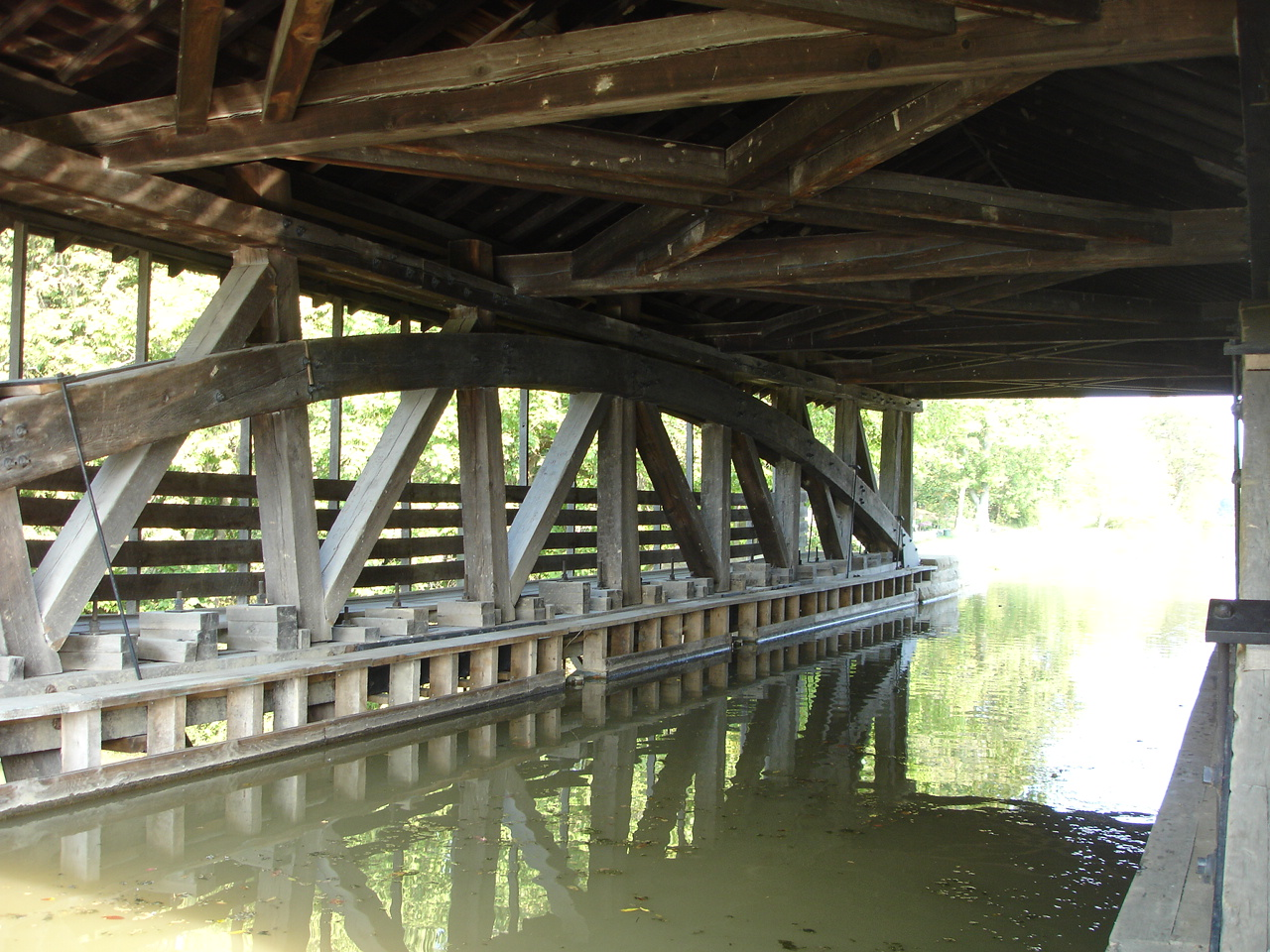
Duck Creek Aqueduct

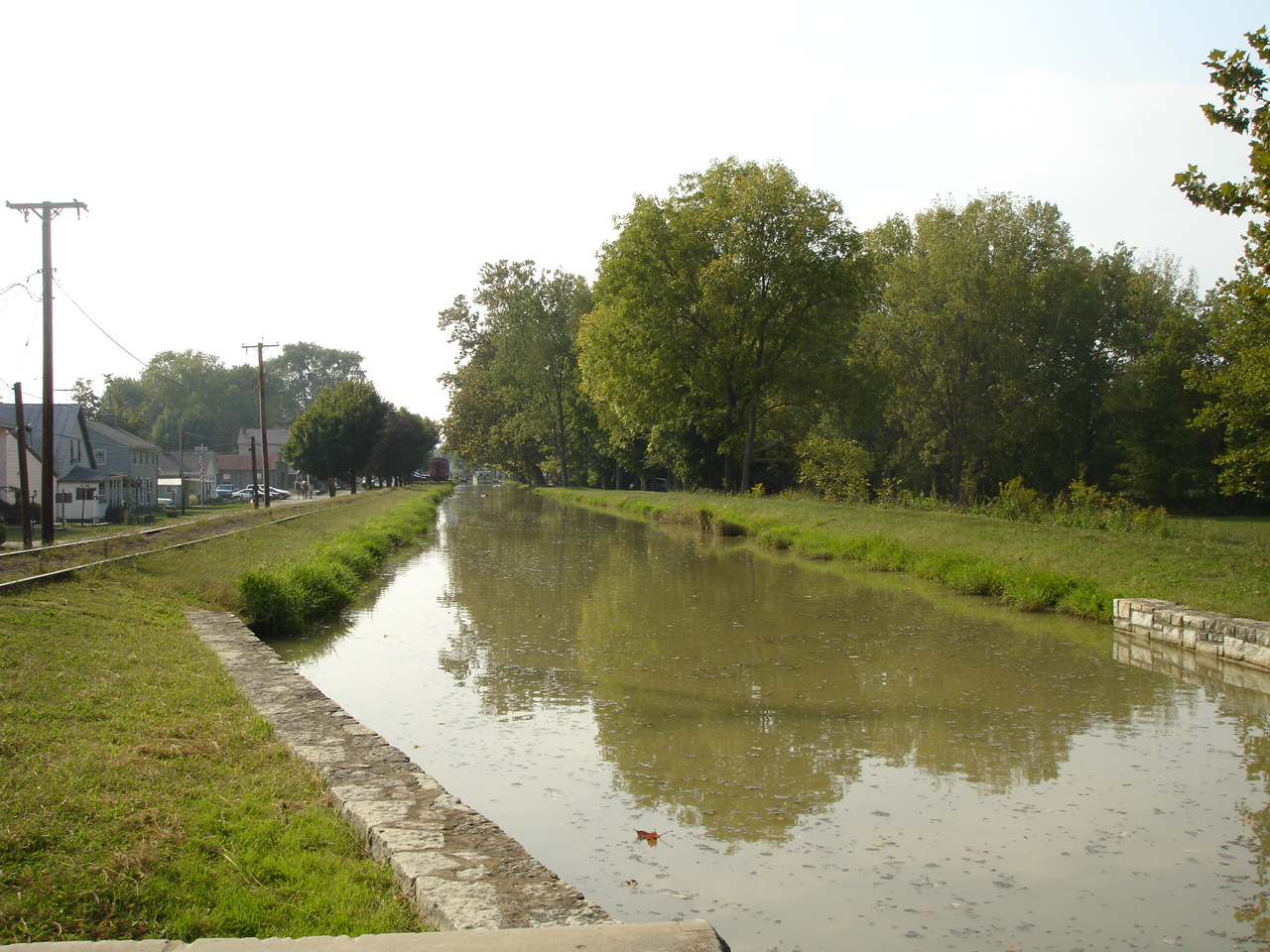
Canal near Duck Creek Aqueduct

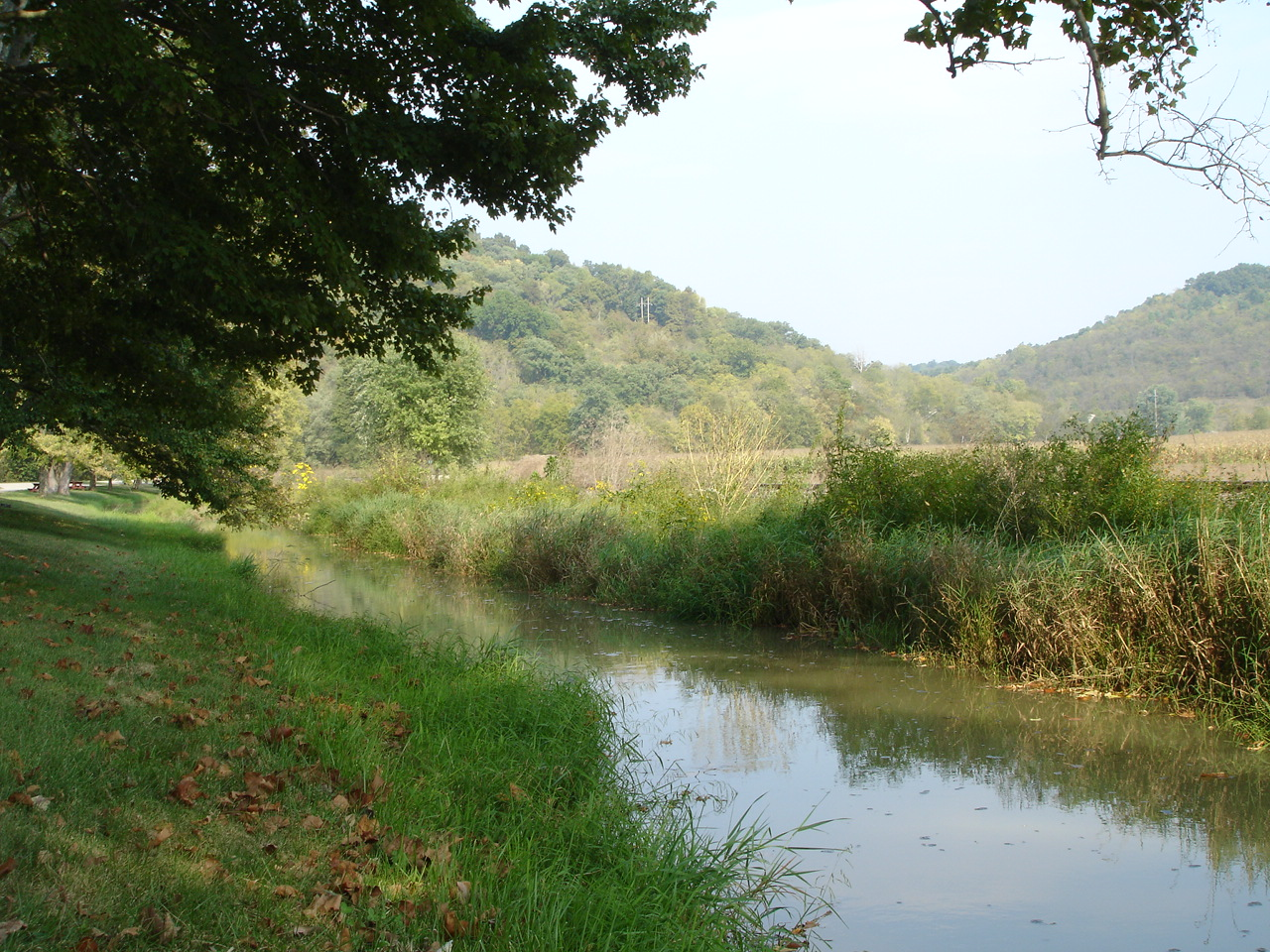
Canal near Metamora, Indiana

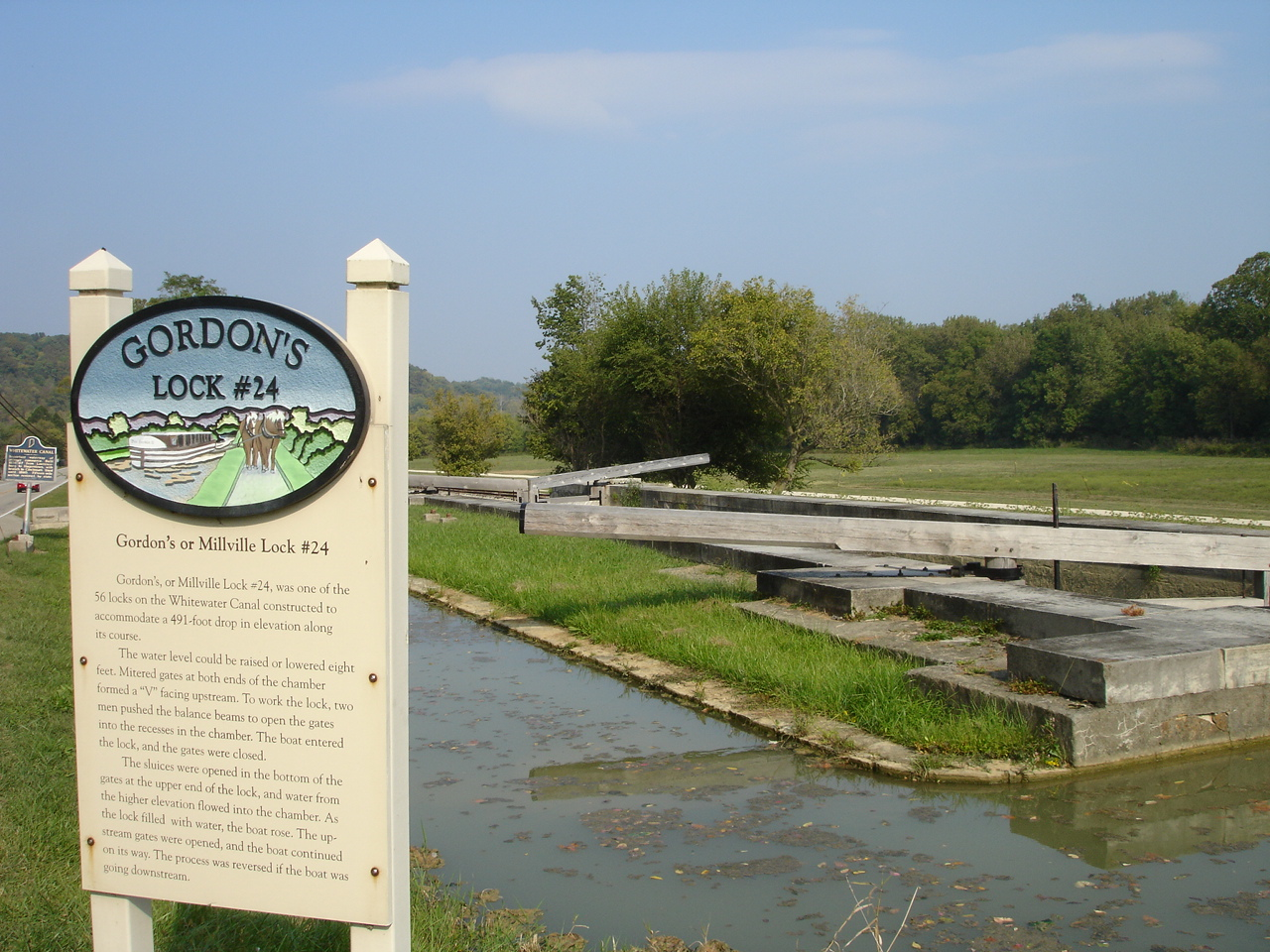
Gordons Lock

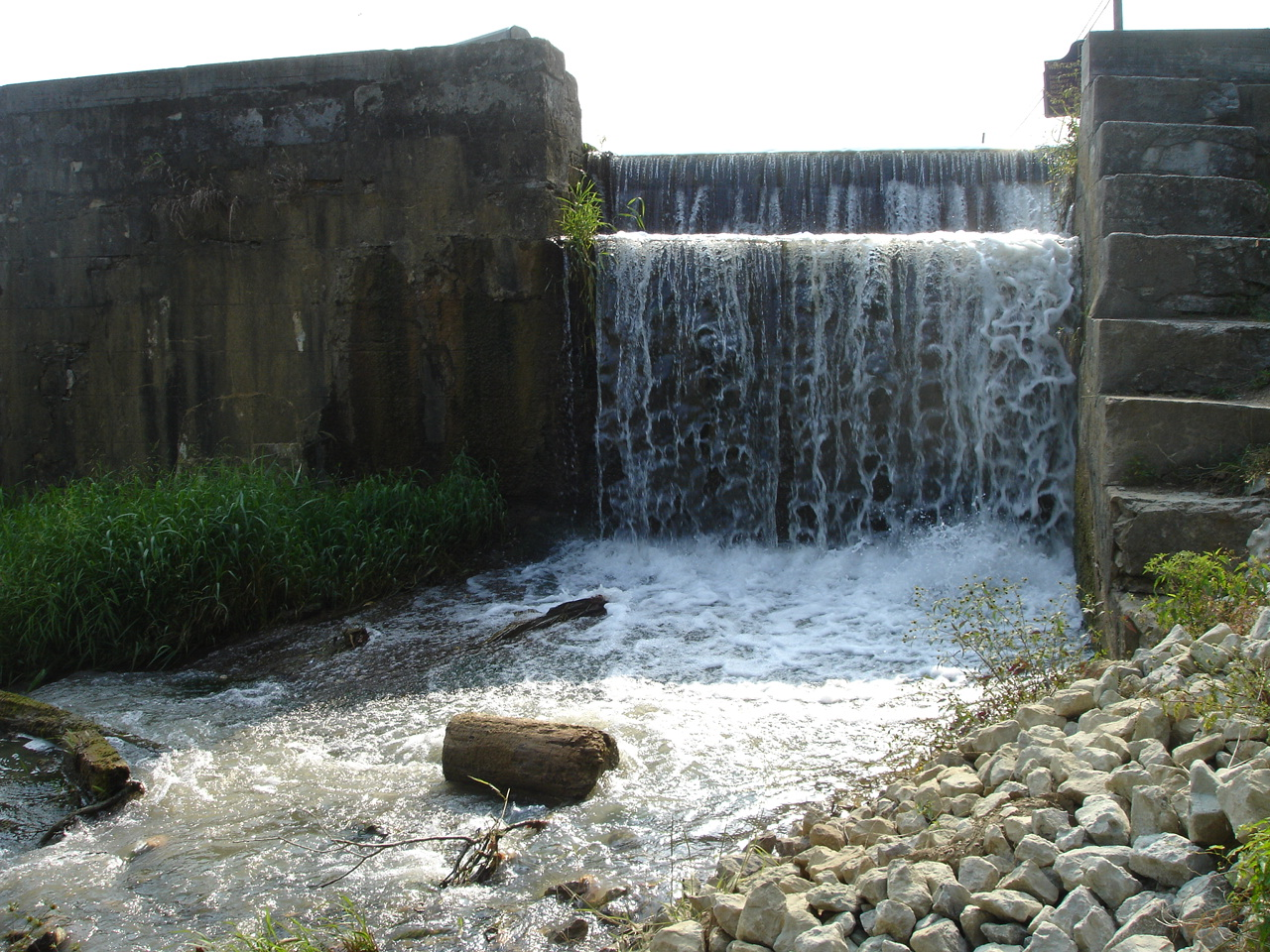
Gordons Lock

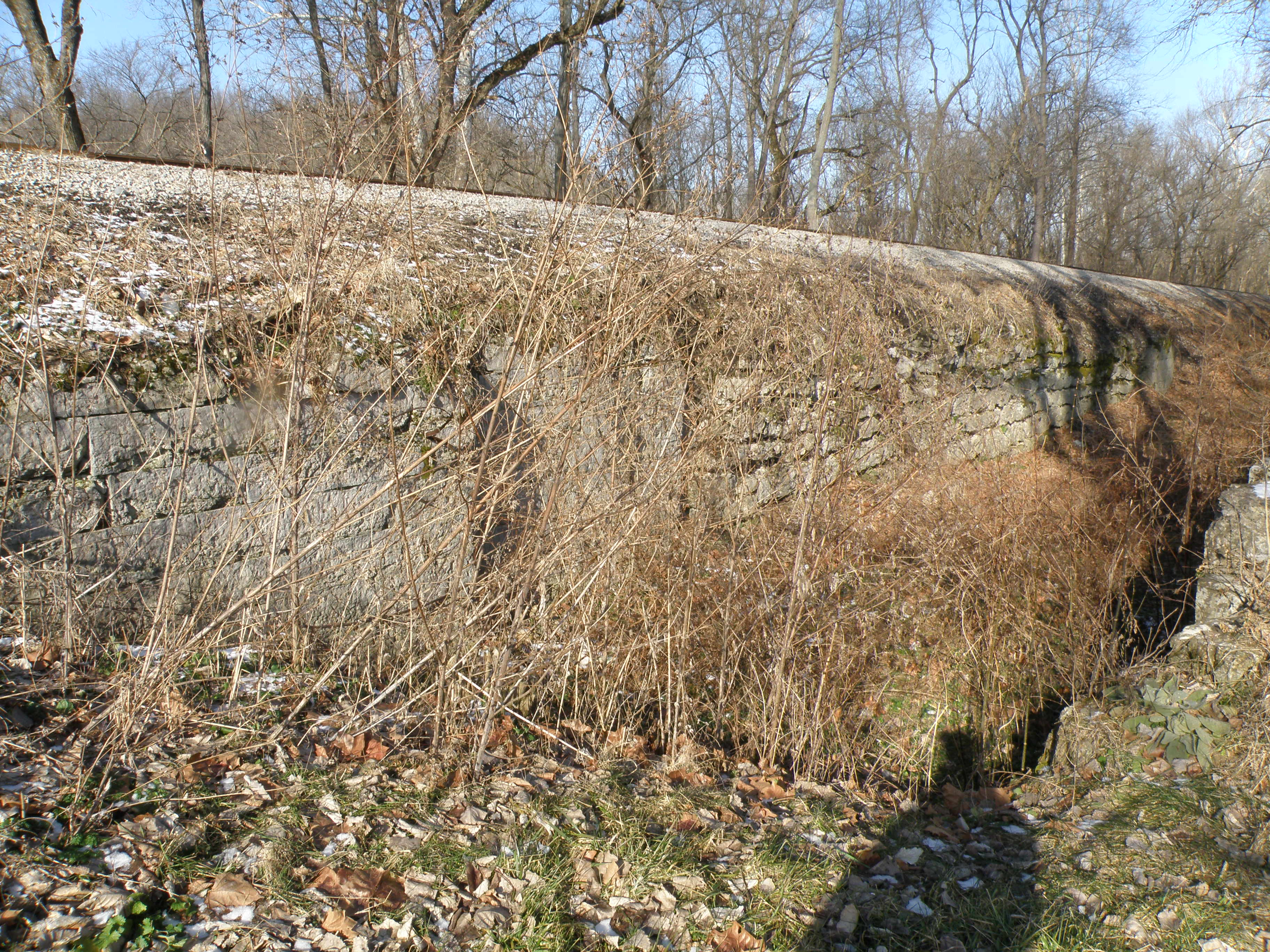
Jenks Lock Ruins at Laurel Dam

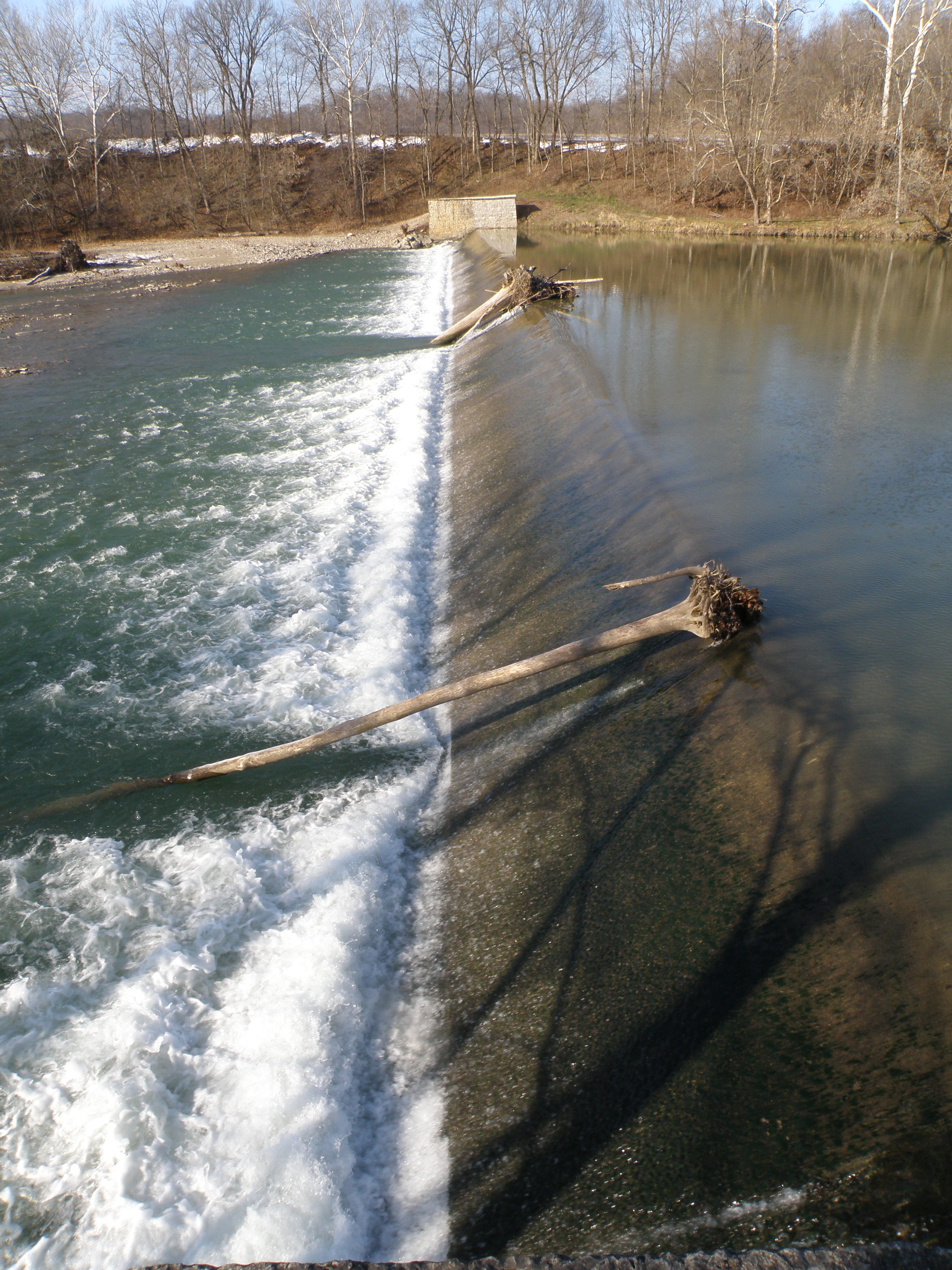
Diversion dam at Laurel

== See also ==
- Canal
- List of canals in the United States
- List of State Historic Sites in Indiana
- Whitewater Valley Railroad
- Wabash and Erie Canal
- Indiana Central Canal
- Indiana Mammoth Improvement Act
