= Little Cedar Grove Baptist Church =

Historic church in Indiana, United States

- U.S. National Register of Historic Places
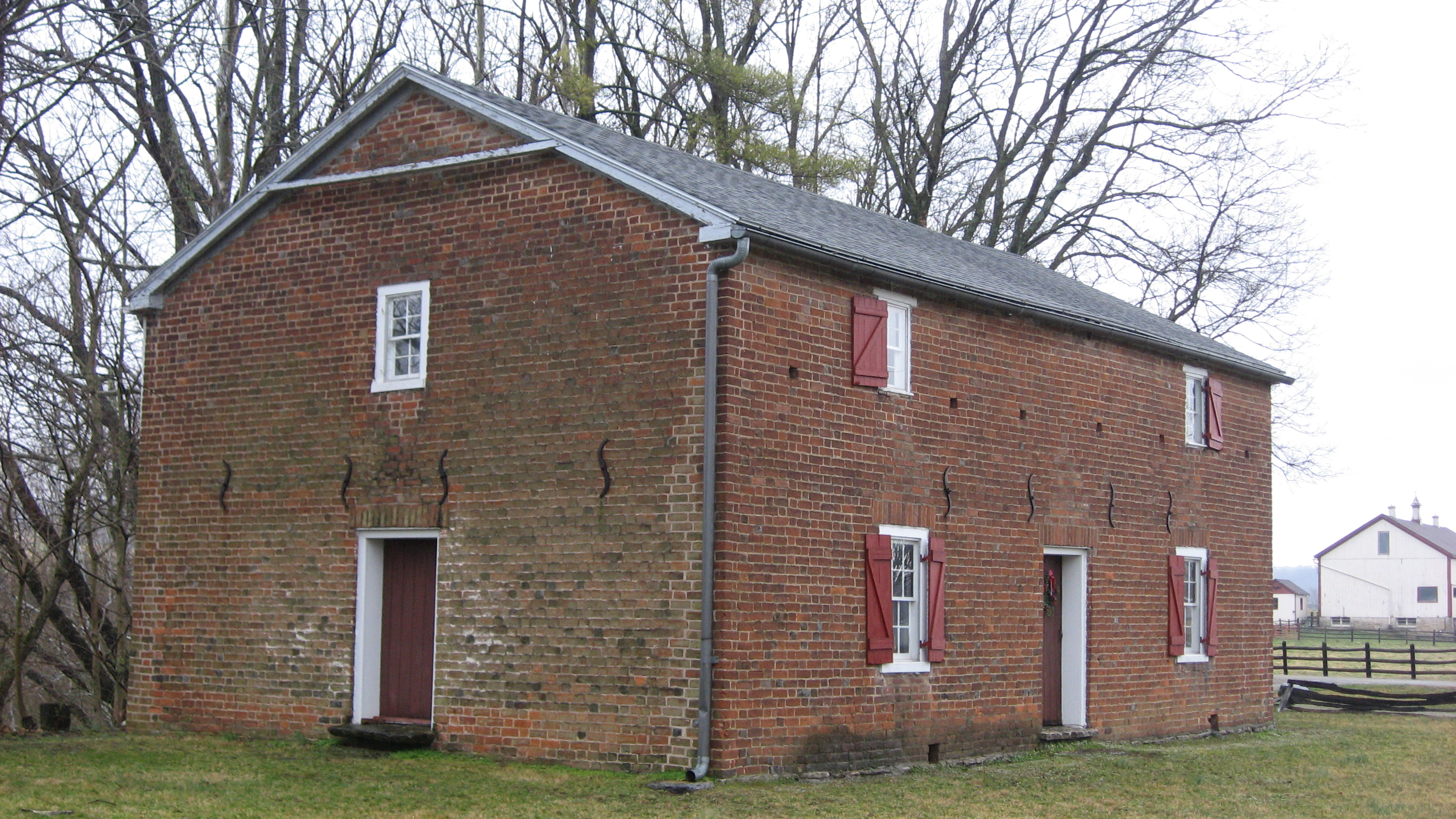
- Front and western side of the church

- Location within Indiana Location within the United States
- Nearest city: U.S. Route 52 at Little Cedar Rd., southeast of Brookville, Brookville Township, Franklin County, Indiana
- Coordinates: 39°23′14.16″N 84°58′52.99″W
- Area: 2 acres (0.81 ha)
- Built: 1812
- Built by: Carter, Thomas; Winscott, Thomas
- Architectural style: Federal
- NRHP reference No.: 90000366
- Added to NRHP: March 22, 1990

Little Cedar Grove Baptist Church was organized in 1797 by some of the early Primitive Baptist settlers of Franklin County, Indiana. The historic church building, constructed in 1812, is the oldest church in the state of Indiana still standing on its original foundation.

It was listed on the National Register of Historic Places in 1990.

== Organization ==
The church was organized by Primitive Baptists, who came from Virginia via Kentucky in 1797. with Elder William Tyner and his family. They organized the Little Cedar Grove Baptist Church, the first church in the Whitewater River Valley. The members built a log church as early as 1805, about two or three miles southeast of Brookville, Indiana. In 1812 they built a large brick church, with balcony, and rifle ports. It is the oldest church building standing on its original site in Indiana. It is open as a historic site. Little Cedar also has a small cemetery where some of the early settlers were buried.

The Big Cedar Baptist Church and Burying Ground on Big Cedar Creek Road, between the road to Reily and the Oxford Pike was an arm or branch of the Little Cedar Grove Baptist Church.

== Construction ==
The church group had organized several years before building a permanent building. In December 1811 the New Madrid earthquake occurred the church members took it as a sign of judgment for their failure to build a proper church. Rev. Allen Wiley, a circuit rider of the church, said "The people ran to and fro, called for prayer meetings, exhorted each other to do good deeds and repent of sins as if Judgment Day was at hand. Then they met in solemn conclave and made a covenant with the almighty that if he would send no more earthquakes, they would build Him a church". The congregation then quickly proceeded to build a large brick church. The new church building was finished on August 1, 1812.

== See also ==
- List of the oldest churches in the United States
