= Oldenburg, Indiana =

- Town
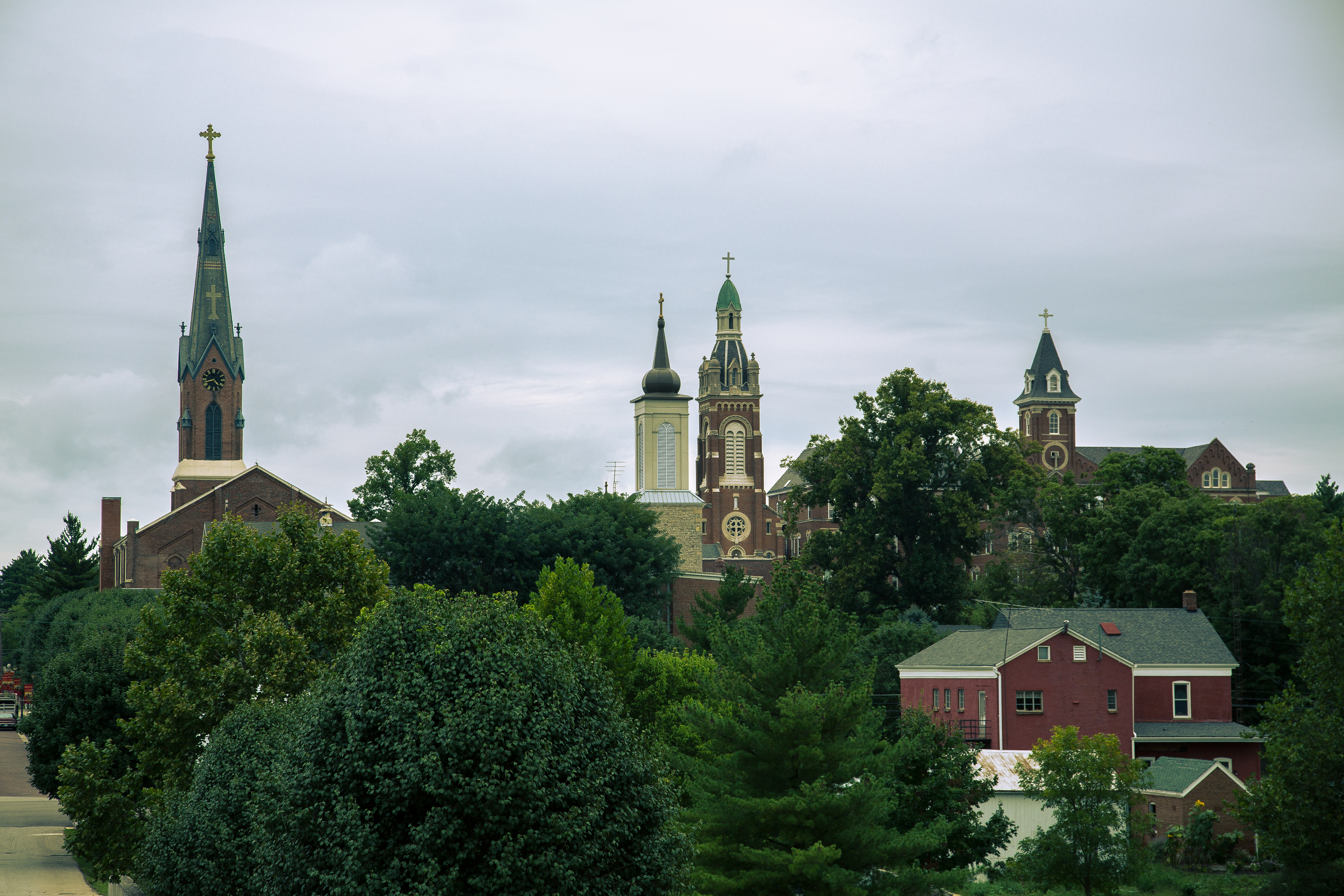

- Flag

- Location of Oldenburg in Franklin County, Indiana.
- Coordinates: 39°20′20″N 85°12′15″W
- Country: United States
- State: Indiana
- County: Franklin
- Township: Ray

Area
  - Total: 0.43 sq mi (1.12 km^{2})
  - Land: 0.43 sq mi (1.11 km^{2})
  - Water: 0.0039 sq mi (0.01 km^{2})
- Elevation: 879 ft (268 m)

Population (2020)
  - Total: 647
  - Density: 1,505.2/sq mi (581.15/km^{2})
- Time zone: UTC-5 (Eastern (EST))
  - Summer (DST): UTC-4 (EDT)
- ZIP code: 47036
- Area code: 812
- FIPS code: 18-56286
- GNIS feature ID: 2396831
- Website: www.oldenburgindiana.org

Oldenburg is a town in Ray Township, Franklin County, Indiana, United States. As of the 2020 census, Oldenburg had a population of 647.

== Geography ==
According to the 2010 census, Oldenburg has a total area of 0.43 square miles (1.11 km^{2}), all land.

== History ==
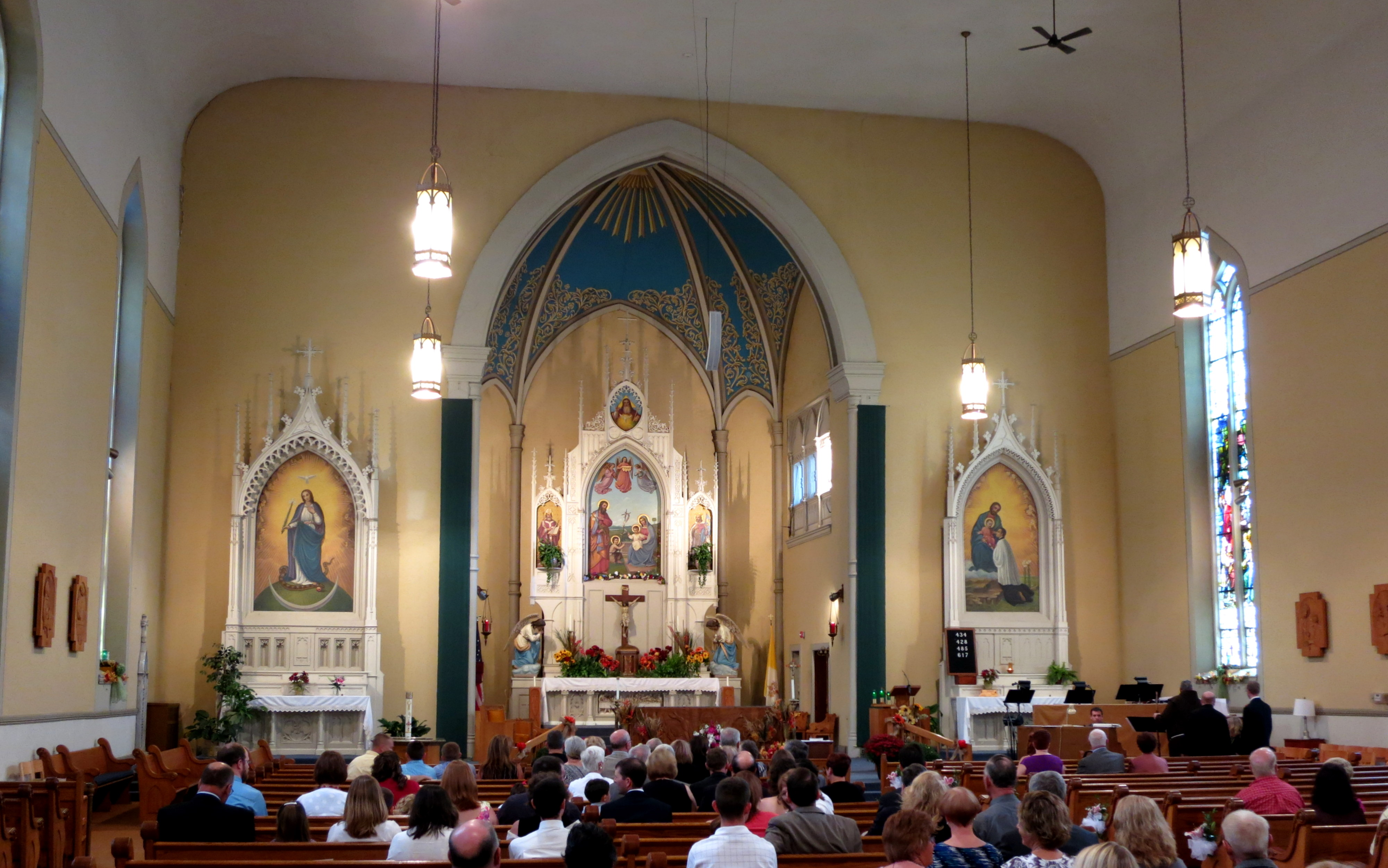
Interior of Holy Family Catholic Church in Oldenburg

Oldenburg was founded in 1837 by a group of German settlers. The town was named after Oldenburg, in Germany. Incorporated in 1881, Oldenburg is called the "Village of Spires" because of its churches and religious educational institutions. In 1851, Mother Theresa Hackelmeier (1827–1860) founded the Sisters of St. Francis of Oldenburg who would open numerous schools in the Midwest.

The Oldenburg Historic District was listed on the National Register of Historic Places in 1983.

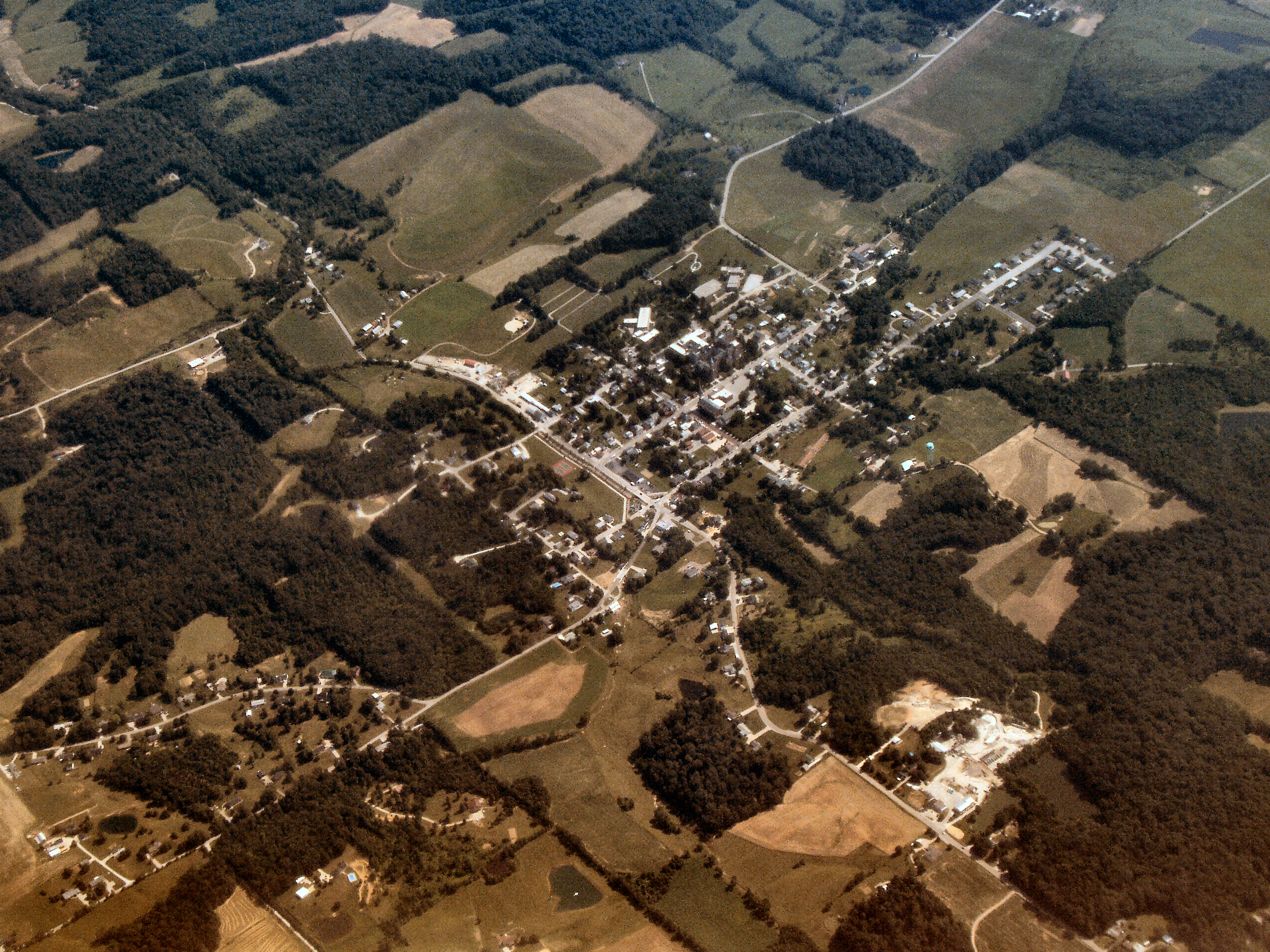
Fly-over view of Oldenburg

== Demographics ==
Historical population
Census	Pop.	Note	%±
1860	300		—
1870	160		−46.7%
1880	673		320.6%
1890	690		2.5%
1900	957		38.7%
1910	956		−0.1%
1920	628		−34.3%
1930	575		−8.4%
1940	533		−7.3%
1950	591		10.9%
1960	694		17.4%
1970	758		9.2%
1980	770		1.6%
1990	715		−7.1%
2000	647		−9.5%
2010	674		4.2%
2020	647		−4.0%
U.S. Decennial Census

=== 2010 census ===
As of the census of 2010, there were 674 people, 235 households, and 156 families living in the town. The population density was 1,567.4 inhabitants per square mile (605.2/km^{2}). There were 268 housing units at an average density of 623.3 per square mile (240.7/km^{2}). The racial makeup of the town was 98.5% White, 0.1% African American, 0.6% from other races, and 0.7% from two or more races. Hispanic or Latino of any race were 1.9% of the population.

There were 235 households, of which 30.6% had children under the age of 18 living with them, 52.3% were married couples living together, 10.6% had a female householder with no husband present, 3.4% had a male householder with no wife present, and 33.6% were non-families. 29.4% of all households were made up of individuals, and 14.9% had someone living alone who was 65 years of age or older. The average household size was 2.39 and the average family size was 2.97.

The median age in the town was 51 years. 20.6% of residents were under the age of 18; 5.8% were between the ages of 18 and 24; 17.3% were from 25 to 44; 26.7% were from 45 to 64; and 29.5% were 65 years of age or older. The gender makeup of the town was 39.3% male and 60.7% female.

=== 2000 census ===
As of the census of 2000, there were 647 people, 215 households, and 135 families living in the town. The population density was 1,554.2 inhabitants per square mile (600.1/km^{2}). There were 228 housing units at an average density of 547.7 per square mile (211.5/km^{2}). The racial makeup of the town was 98.92% White, 0.46% Asian, and 0.62% from two or more races. Hispanic or Latino of any race were 0.15% of the population.

There were 215 households, out of which 27.4% had children under the age of 18 living with them, 54.4% were married couples living together, 7.0% had a female householder with no husband present, and 37.2% were non-families. 34.4% of all households were made up of individuals, and 19.5% had someone living alone who was 65 years of age or older. The average household size was 2.31 and the average family size was 3.01.

In the town, the population was spread out, with 17.3% under the age of 18, 5.1% from 18 to 24, 21.2% from 25 to 44, 21.8% from 45 to 64, and 34.6% who were 65 years of age or older. The median age was 49 years. For every 100 females, there were 63.0 males. For every 100 females age 18 and over, there were 55.5 males.

The median income for a household in the town was $42,292, and the median income for a family was $56,042. Males had a median income of $36,635 versus $28,571 for females. The per capita income for the town was $19,620. About 2.3% of families and 17.7% of the population were below the poverty line, including 1.8% of those under age 18 and 41.6% of those age 65 or over.

== Notable natives of Oldenburg ==
- John Henry Tihen (1861–1940) American prelate of the Roman Catholic Church
