= National Register of Historic Places listings in Fayette County, Indiana =

Location of Fayette County in Indiana

This is a list of the National Register of Historic Places listings in Fayette County, Indiana.

This is intended to be a complete list of the properties on the National Register of Historic Places in Fayette County, Indiana, United States. Latitude and longitude coordinates are provided for many National Register properties; these locations may be seen together in a map.

There are nine properties listed on the National Register in the county. Another property was once listed but has been removed.

Properties and districts located in incorporated areas display the name of the municipality, while properties and districts in unincorporated areas display the name of their civil township. Properties and districts split between multiple jurisdictions display the names of all jurisdictions.

This National Park Service list is complete through NPS recent listings posted January 2, 2026.

== Current listings ==
	Name on the Register	Image	Date listed	Location	City or town	Description
1	Canal House	Canal House	July 16, 1973 (#73000016)	111 E. 4th St. 39°38′24″N 85°08′22″W	Connersville	
2	Connersville Downtown Historic District	Connersville Downtown Historic District	March 7, 2017 (#100000713)	Roughly bounded by Eastern and Grand Aves. and E. and W. 4th and 9th Sts. 39°38′36″N 85°08′17″W	Connersville	
3	Elmhurst	Elmhurst	April 11, 1977 (#77000014)	South of Connersville on State Road 121; 39°37′53″N 85°08′45″W	Connersville	
4	Fayette County Courthouse	Fayette County Courthouse	September 27, 2006 (#06000518)	401 Central Ave. 39°38′27″N 85°08′26″W	Connersville	
5	William Lowry House	William Lowry House	February 11, 1982 (#82000036)	Kniese Rd., east of Bentonville; 39°43′51″N 85°11′12″W	Posey Township	
6	Newkirk Mansion		August 20, 2021 (#100006847)	321 Western Ave. 39°38′29″N 85°08′39″W	Connersville	
7	Thomas Ranck Round Barn	Thomas Ranck Round Barn	January 11, 1983 (#83000030)	North of Brownsville on County Road 500N; 39°42′50″N 85°02′40″W	Waterloo Township	
8	Roberts Park	Roberts Park	January 15, 2014 (#13001074)	Park Rd. and 30th St. 39°40′12″N 85°07′30″W	Connersville	
9	Trinity Episcopal Church & Parish House	Trinity Episcopal Church & Parish House	November 15, 2022 (#100008410)	518 North Eastern Ave. and 215 East 6th St. 39°38′30″N 85°08′14″W	Connersville	

== Former listing ==
	Name on the Register	Image	Date listed	Date removed	Location	City or town	Description
1	Longwood Covered Bridge	Longwood Covered Bridge	December 29, 1981 (#81000011)	January 25, 1989	Roberts Park; 39°40′08″N 85°07′43″W	Connersville	Delisted due to being moved to Roberts Park in Connersville in 1986.

== See also ==
- List of National Historic Landmarks in Indiana
- National Register of Historic Places listings in Indiana
- Listings in neighboring counties: Franklin, Henry, Rush, Union, Wayne
- List of Indiana state historical markers in Fayette County
