= Ansted (disambiguation) =

Ansted was an American automobile manufactured from 1926 to 1927.

- Ansted-Lexington, predecessor of the Ansted manufactured in 1922
- Ansted, West Virginia
- David T. Ansted (1814–1880), English geologist and author
- Harry Bidwell Ansted

== See also ==
- Anstead, a surname
