= Richard N. Elliott =

American politician

Richard Elliott
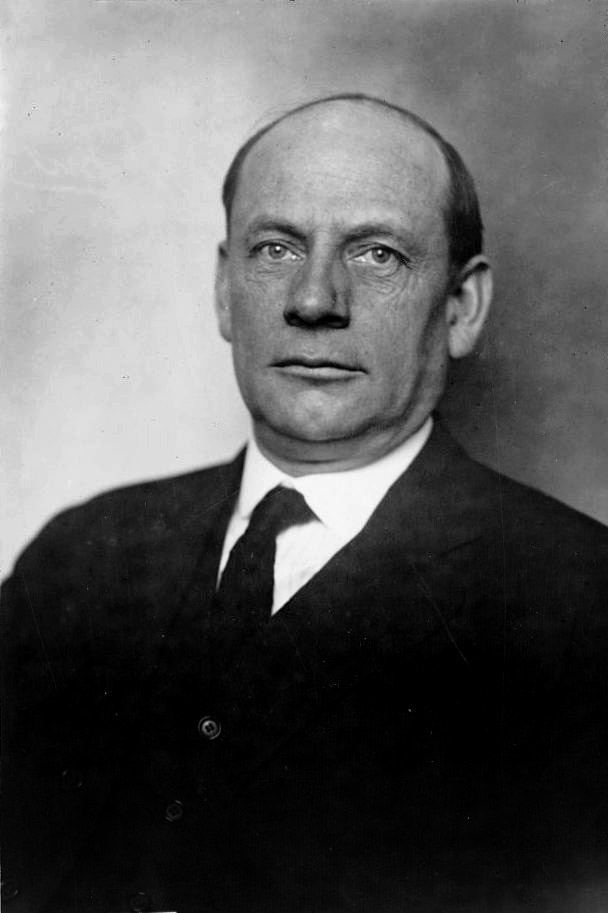

Member of the U.S. House of Representatives from Indiana's 6th district
- In office June 29, 1917 – March 3, 1931
- Preceded by: Daniel W. Comstock
- Succeeded by: William H. Larrabee

Personal details
- Born: April 25, 1873 Connersville, Indiana, U.S.
- Died: March 21, 1948 (aged 74) Washington, D.C., U.S.
- Resting place: Dale Cemetery, Indiana, U.S.
- Party: Republican

Richard Nash Elliott (April 25, 1873 – March 21, 1948) was an American lawyer and politician who served seven terms as a U.S. representative from Indiana from 1917 to 1931.

== Early life and career ==
Born near Connersville, Indiana, Elliott attended the common schools. He taught school for three years. He studied law. He was admitted to the bar in 1896. He was a lawyer in private practice. County attorney of Fayette County, Indiana from 1897 to 1906.

== Political career ==
He served as member of the Indiana House of Representatives from 1905 to 1909. City attorney of Connersville, 1905–1909. He served as delegate to the Republican National Convention, 1916. He served as chair of the Republican State convention in 1930.

=== Congress ===
Elliott was elected as a Republican to the Sixty-fifth Congress to fill the vacancy caused by the death of United States Representative Daniel W. Comstock. He was reelected to the Sixty-sixth and to the five succeeding Congresses (June 29, 1917 – March 3, 1931). He served as chair of the Committee on Expenditures in the Department of State (Sixty-sixth and Sixty-seventh Congresses), Committee on Elections No. 3 (Sixty-eighth Congress), Committee on Public Buildings and Grounds (Sixty-ninth through Seventy-first Congresses). He was an unsuccessful candidate for reelection to the Seventy-second Congress in 1930.

== Later career and death ==
He served as assistant comptroller general of the United States, 1931–1943.

He died on March 21, 1948, in Washington, D.C. He was interred in Dale Cemetery, Connersville, Indiana.

U.S. House of Representatives
Preceded by Daniel W. Comstock	Member of the U.S. House of Representatives from Indiana's 6th congressional district 1917-1931	Succeeded by William Larrabee
