= Anstead =

Anstead is a surname. Notable people with the surname include:

- Ant Anstead (born 1979), English television presenter
- Harry Lee Anstead (born 1937), American judge, Justice of the Florida Supreme Court from 1994 to 2009
- Nick Anstead (born 1981), British academic, currently a Politics lecturer at the University of East Anglia
- Walter Anstead (1845–1933), English cricketer

== See also ==
- Anstead, Queensland, outer suburb of Brisbane, Australia, named after the original land owner John Anstead
- Ansted (disambiguation)
