= KCEV =

KCEV may refer to:

- Mettel Field (ICAO code KCEV)
- KCEV-LP, a low-power radio station (106.1 FM) licensed to serve Marshall, Texas, United States
- KYFW, a radio station (88.3 FM) licensed to serve Wichita, Kansas, United States, which held the call sign KCEV from 1986 to 1991
