= List of Indiana state historical markers in Fayette County =

Location of Fayette County in Indiana

This is a list of the Indiana state historical markers in Fayette County.

This is intended to be a detailed table of the official state historical marker placed in Fayette County, Indiana, United States by the Indiana Historical Bureau. The location of the historical marker and its latitude and longitude coordinates are included below when available, along with its name, year of placement, and topics as recorded by the Historical Bureau. There is 1 historical marker located in Fayette County.

== Historical marker ==
Marker title	Image	Year placed	Location	Topics
The Whitewater Canal		1966	Northeastern corner of the junction of S. Grand Avenue (State Road 121) and Eastern Avenue, between a railroad line and the highway, in the southern part of Connersville; 39°37′57″N 85°8′37″W	Transportation, Business, Industry, and Labor

== See also ==
- List of Indiana state historical markers
- National Register of Historic Places listings in Fayette County, Indiana
