= Ansted-Lexington =

Defunct American motor vehicle manufacturer

The Ansted-Lexington, also known as the Ansted, was an American automobile manufactured in 1922. The Ansted-Lexington was a custom-designed Lexington roadster marketed under the Ansted emblem, sporting an Ansted six as its engine. The sports car was luxuriously appointed, and cost $4,500.
