= Daniel Webster Comstock =

American politician (1840–1917)

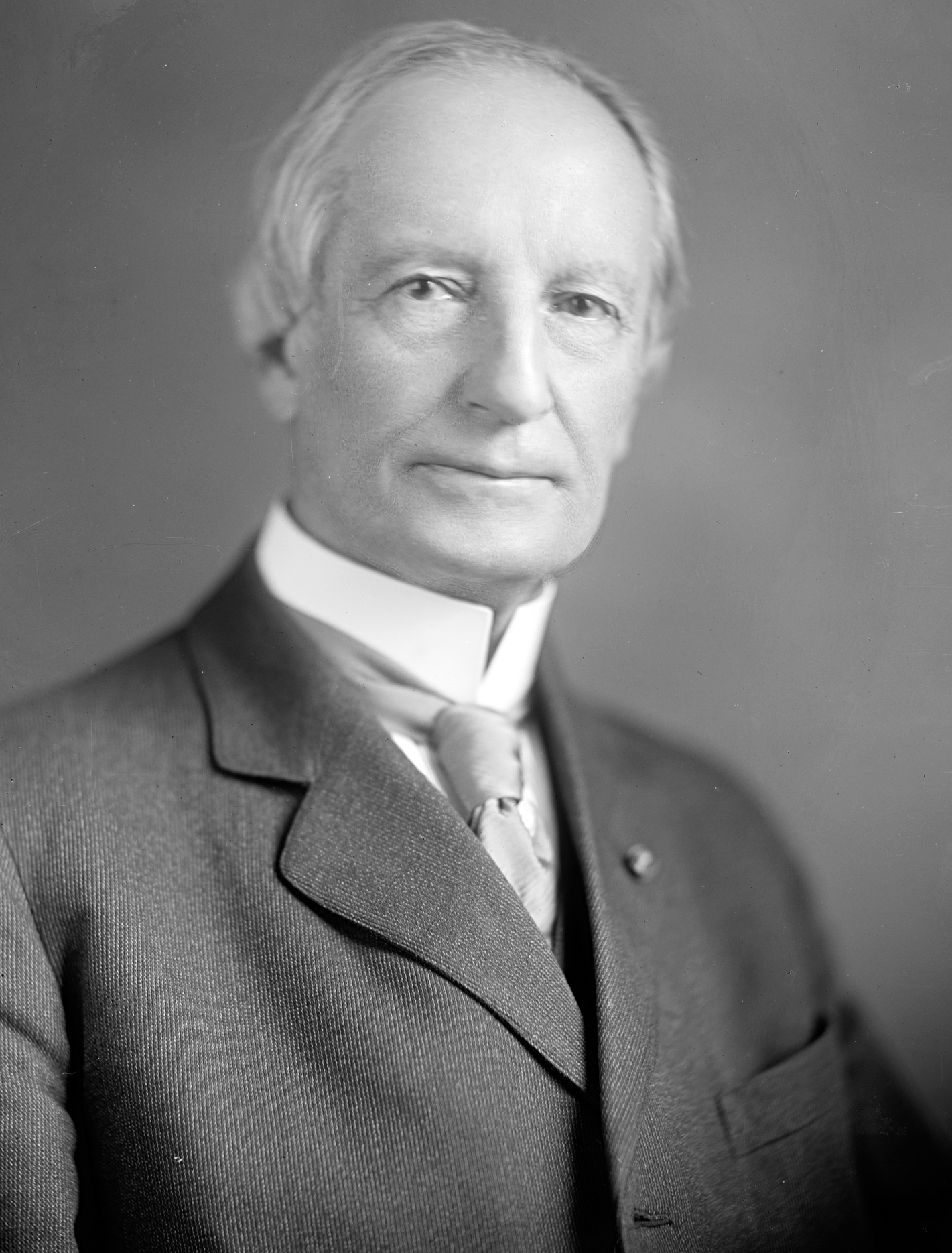

Member of the U.S. House of Representatives from Indiana's 6th district
- In office March 4, 1917 – May 19, 1917
- Preceded by: Finly H. Gray
- Succeeded by: Richard N. Elliott

Personal details
- Born: December 16, 1840 Germantown, Ohio, U.S.
- Died: May 19, 1917 (aged 76) Washington, D.C., U.S.
- Party: Republican

Daniel Webster Comstock (December 16, 1840 – May 19, 1917) was an American lawyer, jurist, and Civil War veteran who briefly served as a U.S. representative from Indiana in 1917.

== Biography ==
Born in Germantown, Ohio, Comstock attended the common schools, and was graduated from the Ohio Wesleyan University, Delaware, Ohio, in 1860. He studied law. He was admitted to the bar in 1861 and commenced practice in New Castle, Indiana. He served as district attorney in 1862.

=== Civil War ===
During the Civil War he enlisted in the Ninth Indiana Cavalry and was successively promoted to regimental sergeant major, first lieutenant, captain, and acting assistant adjutant general in the military division of Mississippi.

=== Career ===
He settled in Richmond, Indiana, in 1866 and became a city attorney in that year. He served as prosecuting attorney of the Wayne circuit court from 1872 to 1874. He served as member of the state senate in 1878. He served as judge of the seventeenth judicial circuit from 1886 to 1895. He served as judge of the appellate court from 1896 to 1911 after which he resumed the practice of law.

=== Congress ===
Comstock was elected as a Republican to the Sixty-fifth Congress and served from March 4, 1917, until his death.

=== Death ===
After serving less than three months in office, he died in Washington, D.C., on May 19, 1917. He was interred in Earlham Cemetery, Richmond, Indiana.

== See also ==
- List of members of the United States Congress who died in office (1900–1949)

U.S. House of Representatives
Preceded by Finly H. Gray	Member of the U.S. House of Representatives from Indiana's 6th congressional district 1917	Succeeded by Richard N. Elliott
