= William O. Barnard =

American politician (1852–1939)

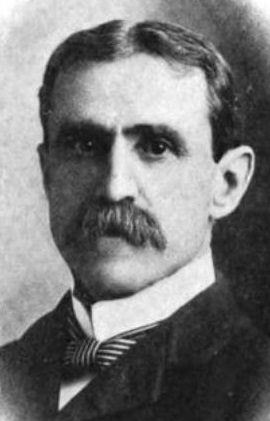
- From Volume II (1906) of Hazzard's History of Henry County, Indiana, 1822-1906

Member of the U.S. House of Representatives from Indiana's 6th district
- In office March 4, 1909 – March 3, 1911
- Preceded by: James Eli Watson
- Succeeded by: Finly Hutchinson Gray

Personal details
- Born: William Oscar Barnard; October 25, 1852 Liberty, Indiana, U.S.
- Died: April 8, 1939 (aged 86) New Castle, Indiana, U.S.
- Resting place: Southmound Cemetery
- Party: Republican

William Oscar Barnard (October 25, 1852 – April 8, 1939) was an American lawyer and politician who served one term as a U.S. representative from Indiana from 1909 to 1911.

== Biography ==
Born near Liberty, Indiana, Barnard moved with his parents to Dublin, Indiana, in 1854, to Fayette County in 1856, and to Henry County in 1866. He attended the common schools, and Spiceland Academy, Spiceland, Indiana.

=== Career ===
He taught school for five years in Henry and Wayne Counties. He was admitted to the Indiana bar, 1876. He served as prosecuting attorney of the eighteenth and fifty-third judicial circuits from 1887 to 1893. He served as judge of the fifty-third judicial circuit court of Indiana from 1896 to 1902.

=== Congress ===
Barnard was elected as a Republican to the 61st United States Congress (March 4, 1909 – March 3, 1911). He was an unsuccessful candidate for reelection to the 62nd United States Congress United States Congress in 1910.

=== Later career and death ===
He resumed the practice of law in New Castle, Indiana.

He died on April 8, 1939, in New Castle, Indiana. He was interred in South Mound Cemetery, New Castle, Indiana.

U.S. House of Representatives
Preceded by James E. Watson	Member of the U.S. House of Representatives from Indiana's 6th congressional district 1909–1911	Succeeded by Finly H. Gray
