= Finly Hutchinson Gray =

American politician

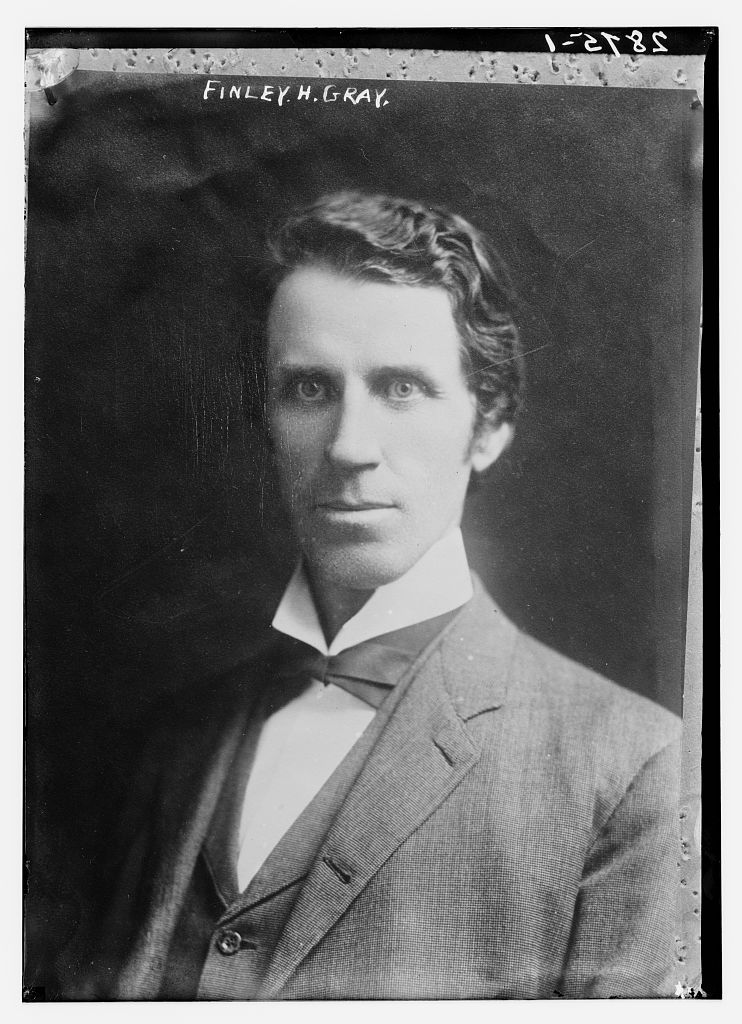

Member of the U.S. House of Representatives from Indiana's 10th district
- In office March 4, 1933 – January 3, 1939
- Preceded by: William R. Wood
- Succeeded by: Raymond S. Springer

Member of the U.S. House of Representatives from Indiana's 6th district
- In office March 4, 1911 – March 3, 1917
- Preceded by: William O. Barnard
- Succeeded by: Daniel Webster Comstock

Mayor of Connersville
- In office 1904–1910

Personal details
- Born: Finly Hutchinson Gray; July 21, 1863 Orange, Indiana, US
- Died: May 8, 1947 (aged 83) Fayette County, Indiana, US
- Resting place: Dale Cemetery
- Party: Democratic

Finly Hutchinson Gray (July 21, 1863 – May 8, 1947) was an American lawyer and politician who served two separate three-term stints as a U.S. representative from Indiana in the early 20th century.

== Biography ==
Born near Orange, Indiana, Gray attended the common schools. He studied law. He was admitted to the bar in 1892 and commenced practice in Connersville, Indiana. He served as mayor of Connersville 1904 – 1910.

=== Congress ===
Gray was elected as a Democrat to the Sixty-second, Sixty-third, and Sixty-fourth Congresses (March 4, 1911 – March 3, 1917). He was an unsuccessful candidate for reelection in 1916 to the Sixty-fifth Congress and for election in 1917 to fill the vacancy in the same Congress caused by the death of Daniel W. Comstock. He resumed the practice of law and also engaged in lecturing.

Gray was again elected to the Seventy-third, Seventy-fourth, and Seventy-fifth Congresses (March 4, 1933 – January 3, 1939). He was an unsuccessful candidate for reelection in 1938 to the Seventy-sixth Congress.

=== Later career and death ===
Reengaged in the practice of law in Connersville, Indiana. He and his wife restored the Canal House and resided there from 1936 to 1947. It later housed the local chapter of the Veterans of Foreign Wars and is now a local history museum. He resided at Connersville until his death there on May 8, 1947. He was interred in Dale Cemetery. The Canal House was added to the National Register of Historic Places in 1973.

Finley Hutchinson Gray married Mary Alice Green and they had a daughter Mary Gray. Mary Gray preceded her mother in death. She was born in 1903 and in the 1930 census is a patient at the Madison Hospital for the Insane in Madison, Jefferson County, IN.

Mary Gray Bird Sanctuary in Fayette County IN: website states: The Mary Gray Bird Sanctuary is owned and operated by the Indiana Audubon Society and is located south of Connersville in Fayette County.

Alice Green Gray gave the initial 264-acre (1.07 km^{2}) property to the Indiana Audubon Society in 1943 as a living memorial to her daughter’ Mary, who preceded her in death. Congressman Finley H. Gray willed additional property to the society in 1947, bringing the total to more than 600 acres (2.4 km^{2}). Gifts from members have allowed the acquisition of more property so that the Sanctuary now occupies more than 700 acres (2.8 km^{2}).

U.S. House of Representatives
Preceded by William O. Barnard	Member of the U.S. House of Representatives from Indiana's 6th congressional district 1911–1917	Succeeded by Daniel W. Comstock
Preceded by William R. Wood	Member of the U.S. House of Representatives from Indiana's 10th congressional district 1933–1939	Succeeded by Raymond S. Springer
