= Howard Garns =

American architect

- Born: March 2, 1905; Connersville, Indiana
- Burial place: Crown Hill Cemetery and Arboretum, Section Community Mausoleum, Lot 2E-Niche E-7; 39.8274766°N 86.1730061°W
- Education: University of Illinois (1926)
- Occupation: Architect
- Notable work: Sudoku

Howard Garns (March 2, 1905 – October 6, 1989) was an American architect who gained fame only after his death as the creator of Number Place, the number puzzle that became a worldwide phenomenon under the name Sudoku.

== Invention of Number Place ==
Garns's colleagues at the Daggett architecture firm in Indianapolis recall the designer working on the game on one of the company's drawing boards. George Wiley, a draftsman for the firm between 1957 and 1967, told Indianapolis Monthly: "We had two extra drawing boards and one day Howard was sitting over there. I walked over and asked what he was working on and he said, 'Oh, a game'. It looked like a crossword puzzle but it had numbers. It had little squares. I walked around on his side and he covered it up. It was a secret."

Robert Hindman, another draftsman at the firm, corroborated the story. "I saw sketches and I thought it was a crossword puzzle, but I wasn't really interested in it," he said. "But it was his thing. He just loved doing it."

Dell Pencil Puzzles and Word Games, which first published Number Place in May 1979, did not publish Garns's byline on the puzzle. However, Will Shortz, the crossword editor for The New York Times, discovered that Garns's name appeared in the list of contributors at the front of the magazine whenever Number Place appeared, and was absent from all other editions.

Garns was alive when Number Place, renamed Sudoku, became popular in Japan in the mid-1980s, but died before it became an international phenomenon in November 2004, when it was printed by The Times of London.

== Personal life ==
Garns was born in Connersville, Indiana, and by his teens had moved to Indianapolis with his father, W. H. Garns, an architect. He attended Indianapolis Technical High School and graduated in 1922. He entered the University of Illinois, and received a Bachelor of Science in architectural engineering in 1926. He worked for his father's firm until the Second World War, when he became a captain in the US Army Corps of Engineers. He joined the Daggett architecture firm after the war.

According to friends, he always looked sharp in bespoke suits and sported a thin moustache.

He died of cancer on October 6, 1989, and was buried in Crown Hill Cemetery, Indianapolis.
