= Longwood Covered Bridge =

- Formerly listed on the U.S. National Register of Historic Places
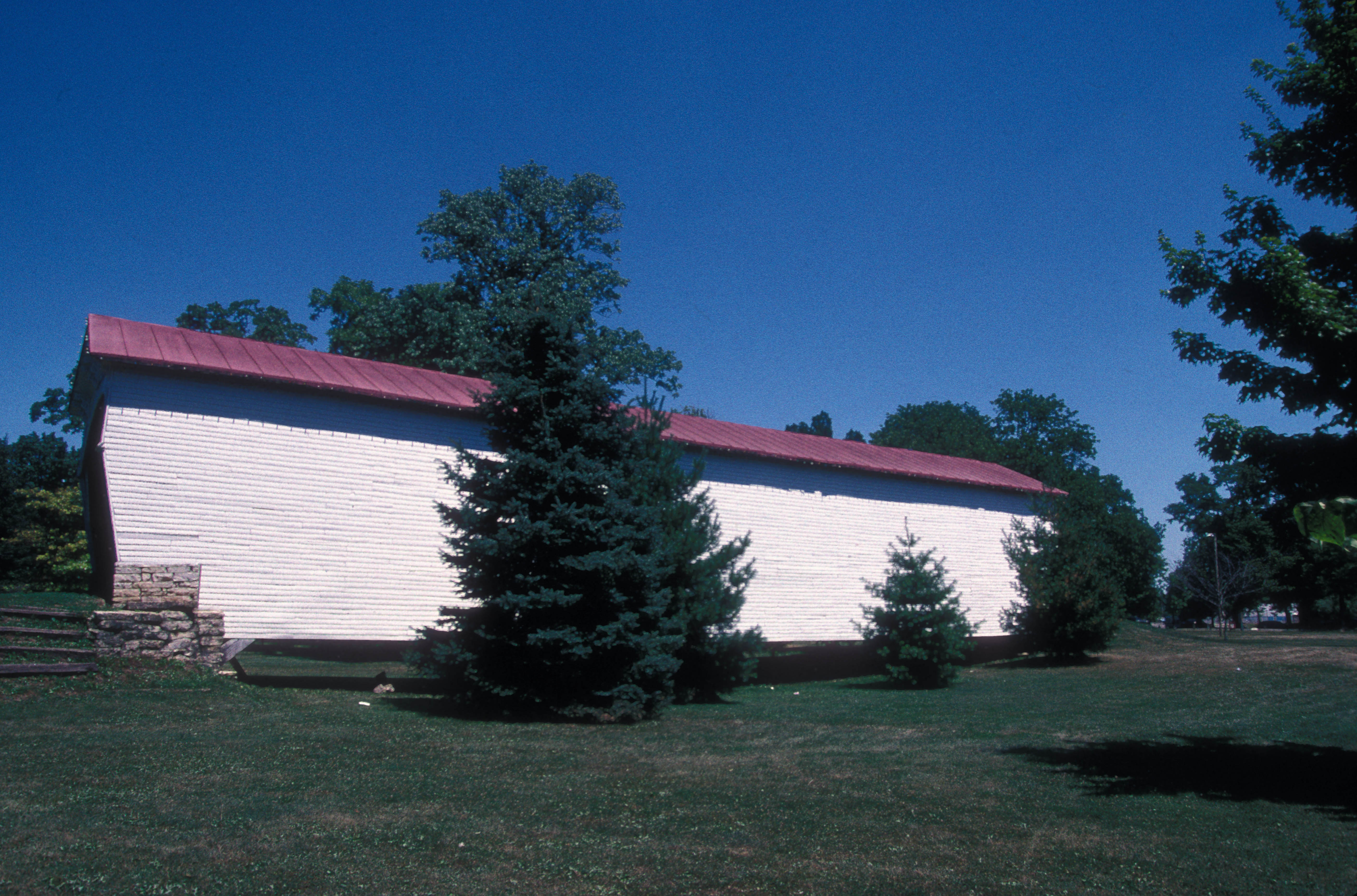
- Longwood Covered Bridge, August 2006

- Location within Indiana Location within the United States
- Location: Roberts Park, Connersville, Indiana
- Coordinates: 39°40′12″N 85°7′30″W
- Area: less than one acre
- Built: 1884
- Built by: Kennedy, Emmett & Charles
- Architectural style: Burr Arch Truss
- NRHP reference No.: 81000011

Significant dates
- Added to NRHP: December 29, 1981
- Removed from NRHP: January 25, 1989

Longwood Covered Bridge is a historic Burr Arch Truss covered bridge located at Connersville, Indiana. The bridge was built in 1884, and measures 97 feet long and 14 feet, 6 inches wide. It is topped by a gable roof and sheathed in wood shingles, wood board siding, and board and batten siding at the gable ends. It was moved in 1984 to Roberts Park in Connersville and situated over dry land.

It was added to the National Register of Historic Places in 1981 and delisted in 1989.
