= Ansted =

Defunct American motor vehicle manufacturer

The Ansted was an American automobile; successor to the Lexington and the Ansted-Lexington, it was manufactured from 1926 to 1927. Following the sale of the Lexington plant in Connersville, Indiana to Auburn, the company marketed its last cars as Ansteds. They were the same as Lexingtons, differing only in their radiators, emblems, and hubcaps.
