= Elmhurst (Connersville, Indiana) =

Historic house in Indiana, United States

- U.S. National Register of Historic Places
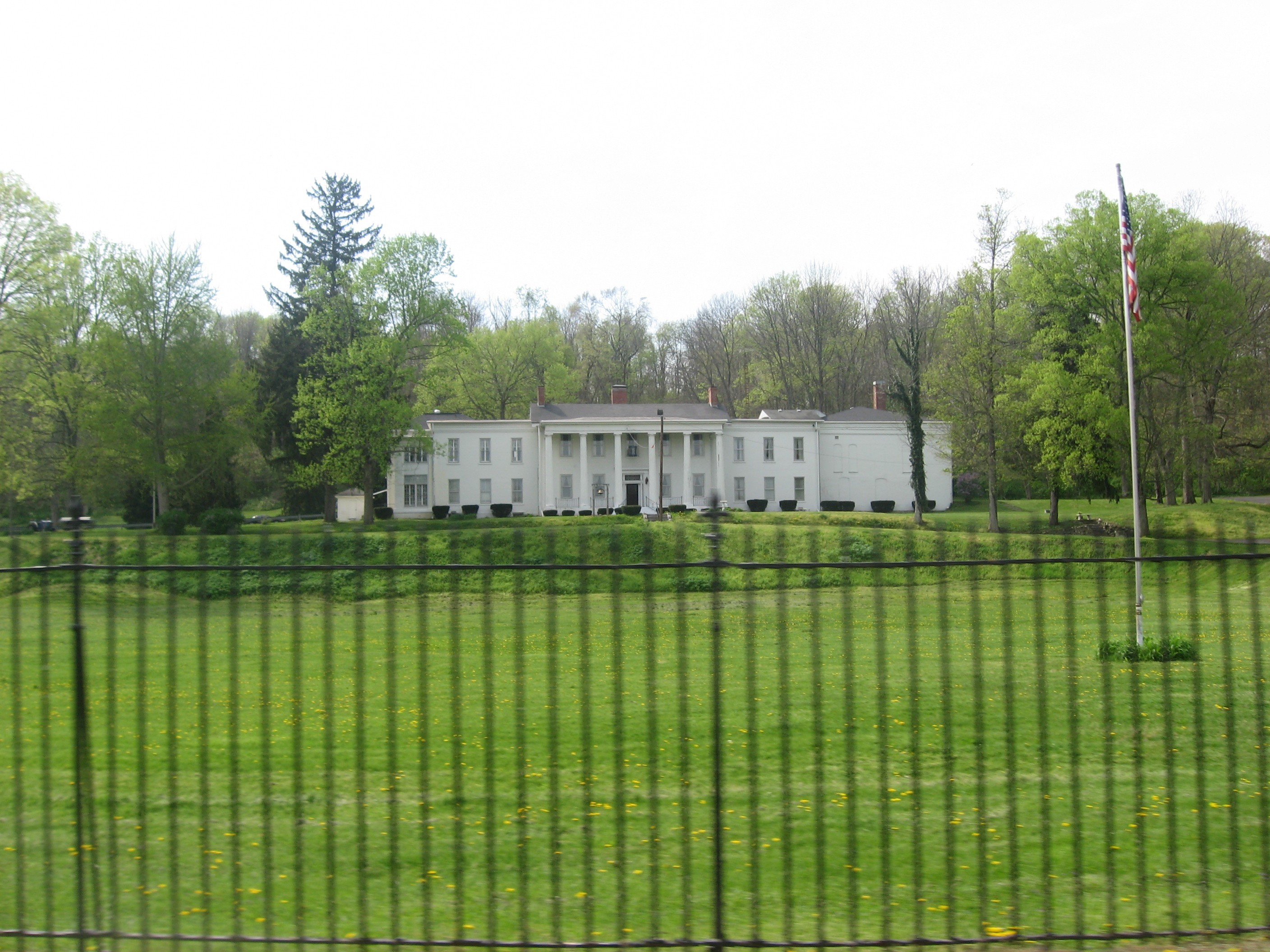
- Elmhurst, April 2012

- Location within Indiana Location within the United States
- Location: South of Connersville, Indiana on State Road 121
- Coordinates: 39°37′53″N 85°8′45″W
- Area: 1 acre (0.40 ha)
- Built: 1831, 1850, 1881, 1901
- Architect: Smith, Oliver Hampton
- Architectural style: Greek Revival, Federal
- NRHP reference No.: 77000014
- Added to NRHP: April 11, 1977

Elmhurst is a historic home located near Connersville, Indiana. It was built in 1831, with later additions and modifications, and is a transitional Federal / Greek Revival style dwelling. Among its residents have been James N. Huston, Samuel W. Parker, Caleb Blood Smith, and Oliver H. Smith.

It was added to the National Register of Historic Places in 1977.
