= Fayette County Courthouse (Indiana) =

- U.S. National Register of Historic Places
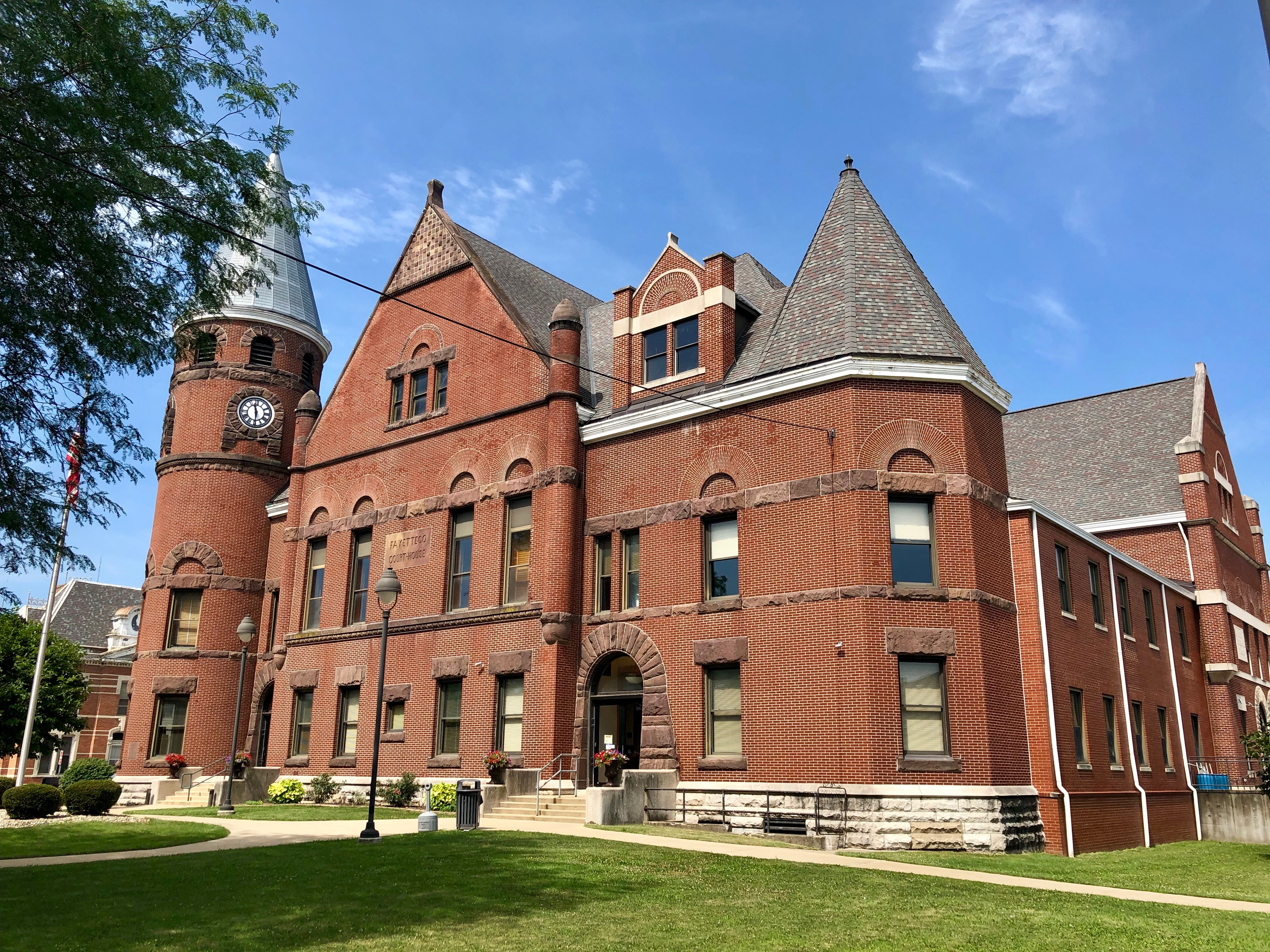
- Fayette County Courthouse, July 2019

- Location within Indiana Location within the United States
- Location: 401 Central Ave., Connersville, Indiana
- Coordinates: 39°38′27″N 85°8′26″W
- Area: less than one acre
- Built: 1890
- Architect: Elder, John; Kaufman, W.S.
- Architectural style: Romanesque
- NRHP reference No.: 06000518
- Added to NRHP: September 27, 2006

Fayette County Courthouse is a historic courthouse located at Connersville, Indiana, United States. It was built in 1890, and is a 2 1/2-story, Romanesque Revival style red brick building. It encompasses the earlier 1849 courthouse in its construction. It features a circular corner clock tower and topped by a steep conical spire.

It was added to the National Register of Historic Places in 2006.
