= Trinity Anglican Church (Connersville, Indiana) =

Church in Connersville, Indiana, United States

Coordinates: 39°38′29.2″N 85°8′13.9″W

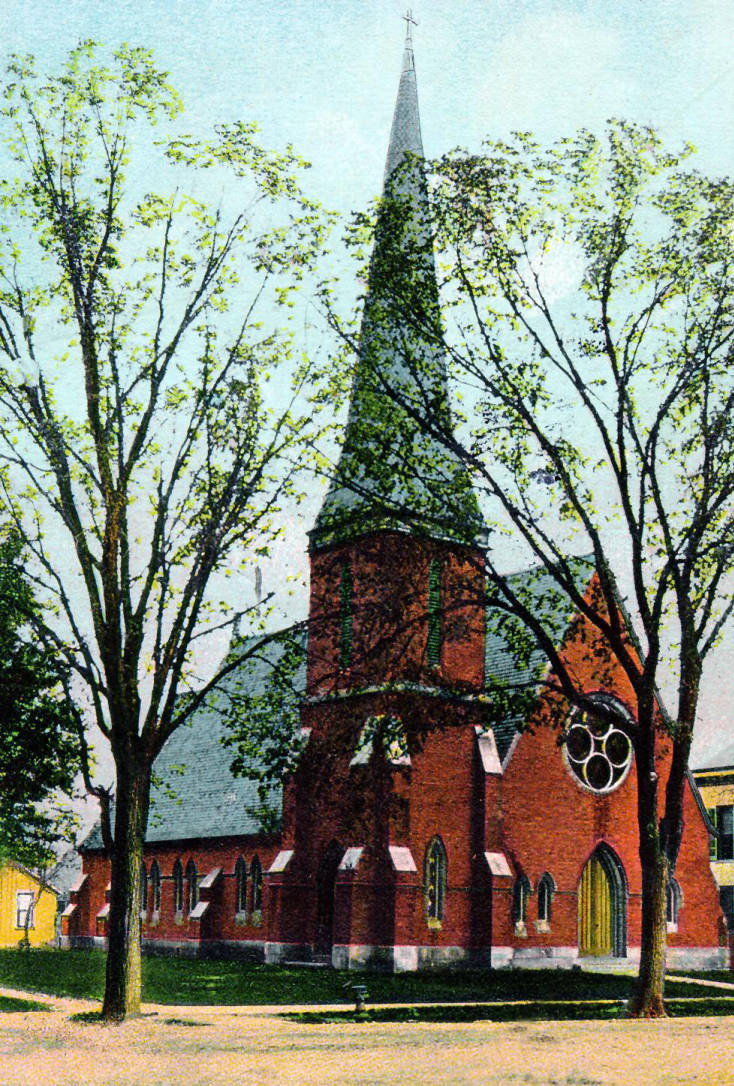
- Trinity Anglican Church
- Location: Connersville, Indiana
- Country: United States
- Denomination: Anglican Church in North America; Reformed Episcopal Church
- Website: trinityconnersville.com

History
- Dedicated: 1859

Architecture
- Architect: Frank Wills
- Style: Gothic revival
- Years built: 1856-1859

Administration
- Diocese: Central States

Clergy
- Bishop: The Rt. Rev. Peter Manto
- Vicar: The Rev. Richard R. Tarsitano
- Trinity Episcopal Church and Parish House
- U.S. National Register of Historic Places
- NRHP reference No.: 100008410
- Added to NRHP: November 18, 2022

Trinity Anglican Church is a Reformed Episcopal parish in Connersville, Indiana. The current congregation was established in 2021 in a 19th-century church building previously occupied by Trinity Episcopal Church, a former congregation of the Episcopal Diocese of Indianapolis. In 2022, the church and parsonage were added to the National Register of Historic Places.

== History ==
The first Episcopal Church minister arrived in Connersville in 1850, and soon after a local Episcopal chapel was built. In 1856, construction began on the present-day Trinity Episcopal Church building at the southeast corner of 6th and Eastern, a location today adjacent to the Downtown Connersville Historic District. The primary fundraiser was teacher and author Mary Ann Helm, the wife of White Water Valley Canal Company and Fayette County Bank President Meredith Helm. Frank Wills—who designed the Anglican cathedrals in Montreal and Fredericton—was the architect.

Trinity closed during the Civil War when most of Connersville's men went to war. A network of Episcopal priests rode circuits from larger towns like Indianapolis and Richmond to conduct services in Connersville and other smaller settlements.

In the late 20th century, Trinity began to experience a decline, with the congregation splitting in the 1970s over revised liturgies such as the "Green Book." It was a book of trial liturgies issued in 1970 that was a forerunner of the 1979 Book of Common Prayer. In 2016, the congregation closed permanently, and in January 2017, Bishop Catherine Waynick deconsecrated the church, which was donated to Indiana Landmarks.

With a grant from the Central Indiana Community Foundation, Indiana Landmarks repaired the church roof and repainted the Carpenter Gothic rectory, then listed the building for sale under a protective easement requiring approval from Indiana Landmarks for any future changes to the exterior.

== Church plant ==
A Reformed Episcopal Church priest, the Rev. Richard Tarsitano, purchased the building for $40,000 with personal funds and opened a mission church there in 2021 as part of the REC100 church planting initiative. Unlike many evangelical church plants in the late 20th and early 21st centuries, Trinity's strategy involves setting up in a small and economically struggling town. The strategy also involves tapping into potential growth in affordable home purchase markets like Connersville as post-COVID teleworkers consider moving farther from larger employment markets, as well as welcoming homeschooling families.

In addition to Sunday services, Trinity Anglican Church offers morning and evening prayer each weekday. The church uses 1662 Book of Common Prayer: International Edition.
