= Canal House =

- U.S. National Register of Historic Places
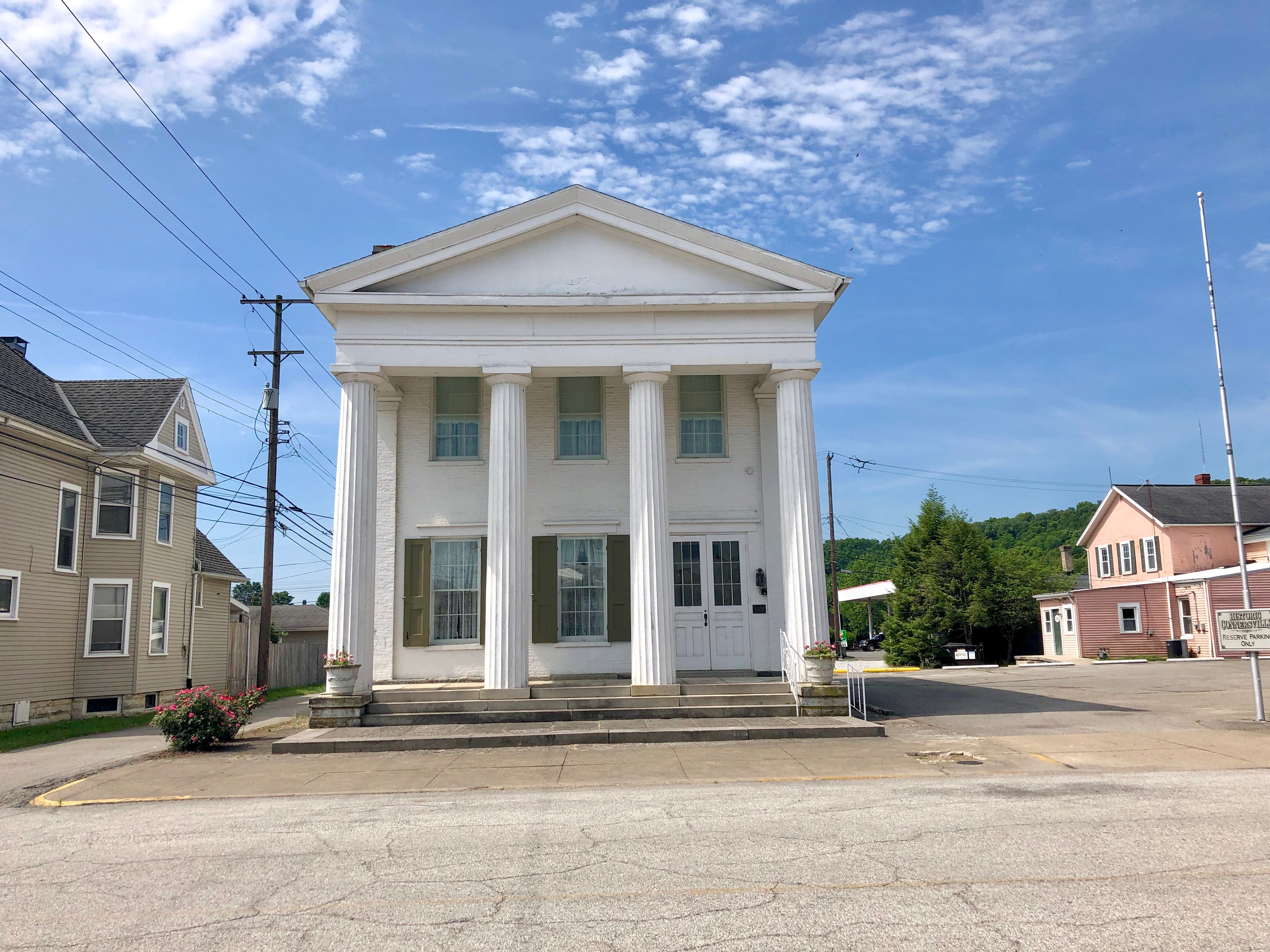
- Canal House, July 2019

- Location within Indiana Location within the United States
- Location: 111 E. 4th St., Connersville, Indiana
- Coordinates: 39°38′24″N 85°8′22″W
- Area: 0.3 acres (0.12 ha)
- Built: 1842; 184 years ago
- Built by: Whitewater Valley Canal Co.
- Architectural style: Greek Revival
- NRHP reference No.: 73000016
- Added to NRHP: July 16, 1973

Canal House is a historic building located at Connersville, Indiana. It was built in 1842 by the Whitewater Valley Canal Co., and is a two-story, temple form, Greek Revival style stone building. It features a pedimented front with Doric order fluted pillars. It was built as quarters for the canal custodian and canal company headquarters. It later housed a bank and was restored by Congressman Finly Hutchinson Gray and his wife, who resided there from 1936 to 1947. It later housed the local chapter of the Veterans of Foreign Wars and is now a local history museum.

It was added to the National Register of Historic Places in 1973.
