= Roberts Park =

- U.S. National Register of Historic Places
- U.S. Historic district
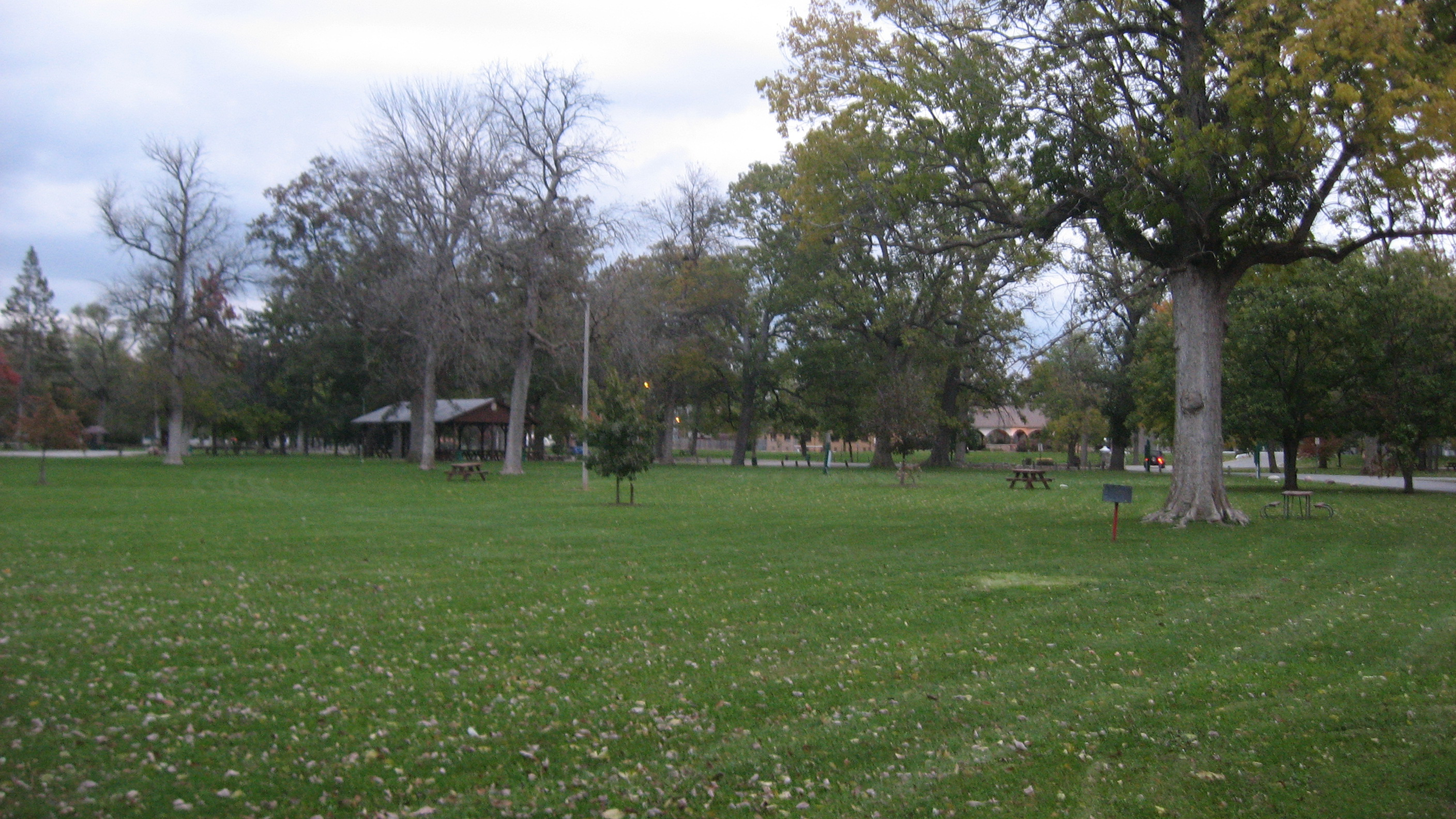
- Roberts Park, October 2013

- Location within Indiana Location within the United States
- Location: Park Rd. and 30th St., Connersville, Indiana
- Coordinates: 39°40′12″N 85°7′30″W
- Area: 80 acres (32 ha)
- Built: 1903
- Architect: Works Progress Administration
- Architectural style: Prairie Style, Classical Revival, Parks Rustic
- NRHP reference No.: 13001074
- Added to NRHP: January 15, 2014

Roberts Park is a historic public park and national historic district located at Connersville, Indiana. The parkland was donated to the city of Connersville in 1902. The 80-acre, rectangular site includes the contributing stone wall lined drives, stone pillars with lamps, a sundial, the Pavilion (1903), Amphitheatre (1907–1909), Horse Track (1903), Judge's Stand (1903), Horse Barns (c. 1910), Liberty Building (1932), Police Building (c. 1940), James E. Roberts Memorial Building (1936), and the Roberts Park Pool (1936). A number of park improvements were made by the Works Progress Administration. Located in the park is the Longwood Covered Bridge, a non-contributing structure formerly listed on the National Register of Historic Places from 1981 to 1989.

It was added to the National Register of Historic Places in 2014.
