= Mettel Field =

- IATA: CEV; ICAO: KCEV; FAA LID: CEV

Summary
- Airport type: Public
- Owner: Connersville BOAC
- Serves: Connersville, Indiana
- Elevation AMSL: 866 ft / 264 m
- Coordinates: 39°41′54″N 085°07′52″W

Map

Runways
Direction	Length		Surface
Direction	ft	m	Surface
18/36	6,503	1,982	Asphalt
4/22	2,601	793	Turf

Statistics (2009)
- Aircraft operations: 8,772
- Based aircraft: 9
- Source: Federal Aviation Administration

Mettel Field (IATA: CEV, ICAO: KCEV, FAA LID: CEV) is a public airport three miles north of Connersville, in Fayette County, Indiana. It is owned by the Connersville Board of Aviation Commissioners. The National Plan of Integrated Airport Systems for 2011–2015 categorized it as a general aviation facility.

For a short time circa 1951 Lake Central scheduled Bonanzas to Mettel.

== Facilities ==
Mettel Field covers 444 acres (180 ha) at an elevation of 866 feet (264 m). It has two runways: 18/36 is 6,503 by 100 feet (1,982 x 30 m) asphalt and 4/22 is 2,601 by 100 feet (793 x 30 m) turf.

In 2009 the airport had 8,772 aircraft operations, average 24 per day: 96% general aviation, 4% air taxi, and <1% military. Nine aircraft were then based at this airport: 78% single-engine and 22% multi-engine.

== See also ==
- List of airports in Indiana
