= Nick Anstead =

British lecturer

Nick Anstead (born 24 May 1981) is a lecturer in the Department of Media and Communication at the London School of Economics, focusing on political communication. He was previously a politics lecturer at the University of East Anglia.

He is a director of the campaigning organisation 38 degrees.

He has been interviewed by national media including BBC2 TV, BBC Radio 4 and More4. He has written for the New Statesman, featured on Beyond Westminster and More4.

He has had journal articles published in British Politics, Renewal, and Journal of Information Technology & Politics, and is co-editing with Will Straw a Fabian book.
