= Lexington (automobile) =

Automobile manufactured in Connersville, Indiana

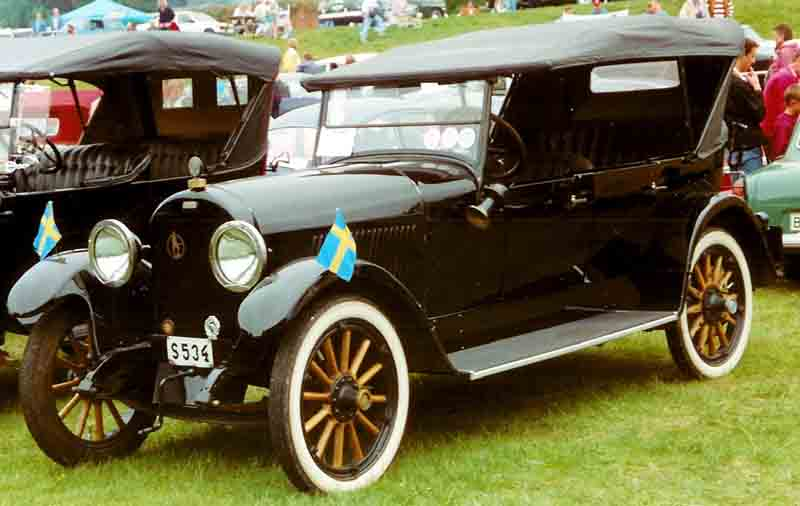
- 1919 Lexington Model R-19 Minute Man Six

Overview
- Manufacturer: Lexington Motor Company
- Production: 1909–1927

Chronology
- Successor: Auburn Automobile

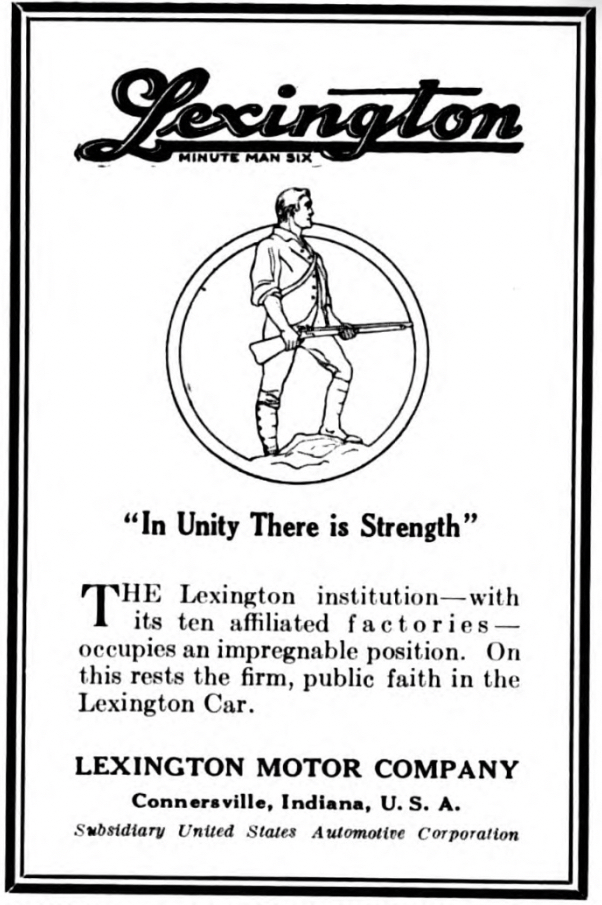
Lexington advertisement (1921)

Lexington advertisement Model DF (1911)

The Lexington was an automobile manufactured in Connersville, Indiana, from 1910 to 1927. From the beginning, Lexingtons, like most other Indiana-built automobiles, were assembled cars, built with components from many different suppliers. The Thoroughbred Six and Minute Man Six were popular Lexington models.

== Origins ==
The Lexington Motor Company was founded in 1909 in Lexington, Kentucky, by Kinzea Stone, a Kentucky race horse promoter from Georgetown, Kentucky. Several months later, the company outgrew its building.

In 1910, a group of Connersville businessmen noted the community had too much tied up in the carriage-making industry, which was being displaced by the growing use of the automobile. The group enticed the infant Lexington Motor Car Company to relocate from Lexington to a new plant at 800 West 18th Street in the McFarlan industrial park, with headquarters at 1950 Columbia Avenue. John C. Moore, the company's chief engineer, immediately started on improvements to the Lexington to keep the company ahead of its competition. His 1911 multiple exhaust was reported to give 30 percent more power on less fuel. Each cylinder had a separate exhaust. Dual exhaust pipes and mufflers were used.

The company entered both the Glidden Tour and Indianapolis 500 in 1912.

== Acquisition and expansion ==
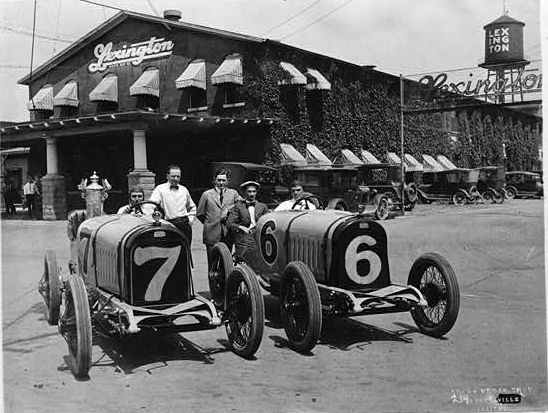
Two racing cars at the Lexington Motor Company facility in Connersville, Indiana, 1920

Financial difficulties were solved in 1913 when E.W. Ansted acquired Lexington to assemble the six-cylinder Howard for a contract with a Chicago distributor. The resultant company was named Lexington-Howard. In 1915, the name changed back to Lexington Motor Company. The regular four-cylinder engine was supplemented by a light six and a supreme six. With the new Ansted engines, Lexington's cars became modern and powerful. In 1916, Lexington was using the Continental engine.

Lexington's first plant expansion was in 1915. A factory building was erected just north of the office. Also built at the same time was a 100-foot (30 m) smokestack with the Lexington name in lighter color bricks. Four years later the company built a 106,050 sq ft (9,852 m^{2}) assembly building just west of the office.

In 1917, Moore put together a new automobile frame with a rigid box cross-section that eliminated the problem of jammed doors caused by frame flexing. This car also had an emergency brake affixed to the drive shaft. In 1918, Lexington autos featured hardtop enclosures made by the Rex Manufacturing Company, also of Connersville.

Also in 1918, the newly formed Ansted Engineering Company acquired Teetor-Harley Motor Corporation of Hagerstown, Indiana. In 1919, the 85,306 sq ft (7,925 m^{2}) Ansted Engine building was erected just north of the Lexington plant and extended to 21st Street. The combined Lexington and Ansted facilities measured three blocks long and two blocks wide totaling 270,000 sq ft (25,000 m^{2}) of floor space.

== Heyday ==
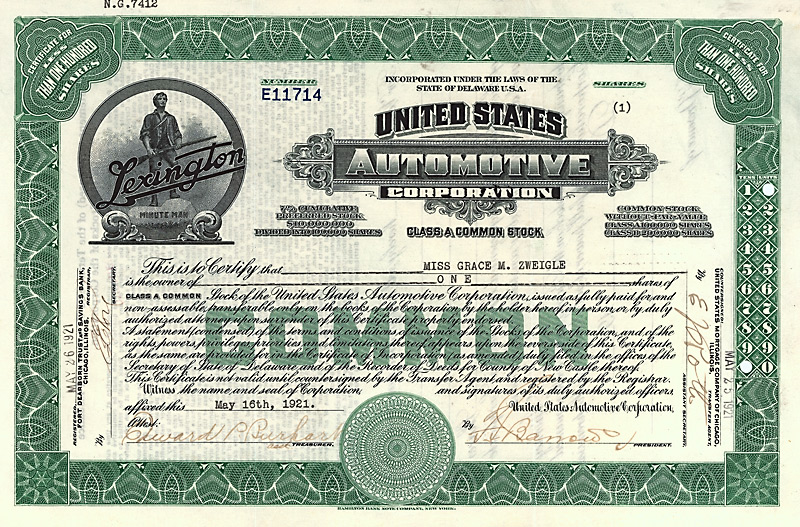
Share of the United States Automotive Corporation, issued 11. March 1921

Two short-wheelbase race cars with the powerful Ansted engine were built by Lexington for the 1920 Pikes Peak hill climb. The cars placed first and second in their initial outing and brought home the Penrose trophy. Again in 1924, Otto Loesche won, with an 18-minute 15-second dash and brought the trophy home for keeps. The Penrose trophy is on display at the Fayette County Historical Museum on Vine Street, Connersville Indiana.

The formation of the United States Automotive Corporation was announced by President Frank B. Ansted at the New York Auto Show on January 12, 1920. It was a $10 million merger with the Lexington, the Ansted Engineering Company, and Connersville Foundry Corporation, all from Connersville, plus the Teetor-Harley Motor Corporation of Hagerstown. 1920 marked the high point of Lexington production with over 6,000 built.

On December 16, 1921, William C. Durant, founder of General Motors and former GM president, ordered 30,000 Ansted engines for his new Durant Six being built in Muncie, Indiana, by Durant Motors, Inc. Late in 1921, Alanson Partridge Brush (designer of the Brush Runabout and consulting engineer to General Motors) sued the company, alleging the Ansted engine infringed a number of his patents.

== Phase-out ==
The post-World War I recession of the early twenties hurt the Lexington Motor Car Company and United States Automotive Corporation. Production in 1922 plummeted to roughly a third of that of 1920. In 1923, Ansted Engine Company entered receivership, with Durant as a principal claimant. Lexington also entered receivership in 1923. In 1926 and 1927, respectively, E.L. Cord's Auburn Automobile Company purchased Ansted Engine and the Lexington Motor Car Company. The Lexington was soon phased out.

== Models ==
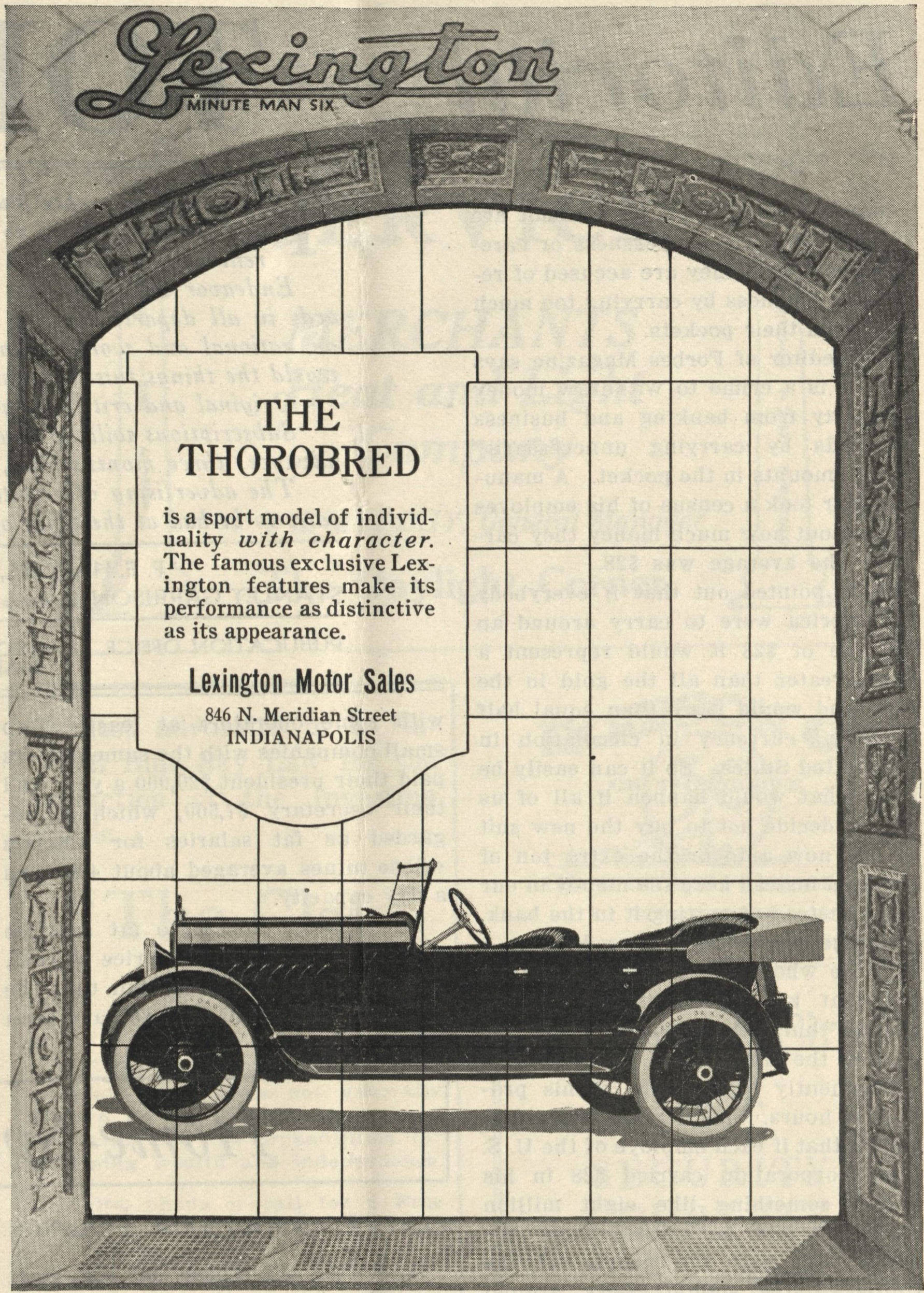
An advertisement in a 1920 Indianapolis newspaper for "The Thorobred" [sic].

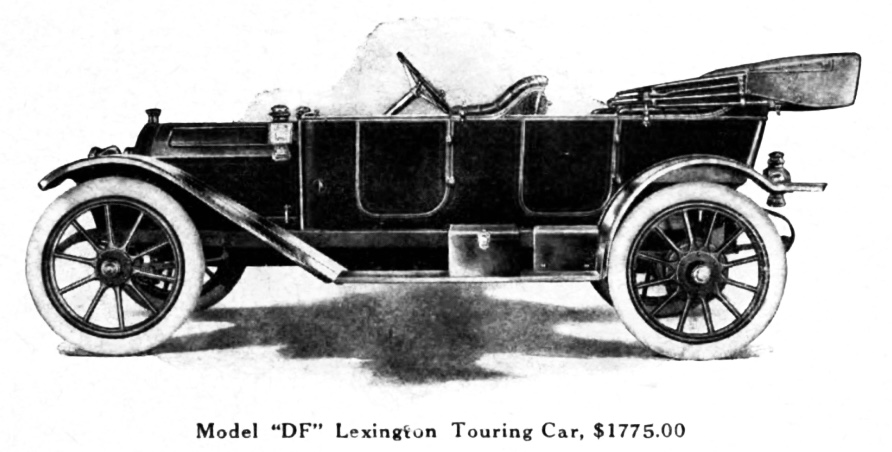
Lexington Model DF (1911–1912)

The early Lexingtons of 1910 to 1913 were four-cylinder automobiles built on 116 in (2,946 mm) to 122 in (3,099 mm) wheelbases, with body styles including 2 seat runabouts and roadsters, 5 and 7 passenger tourers, and limousines.

1914 marked the introduction of a six-cylinder auto on a 130" (3302 mm) wheelbase. In 1915, the 29 hp (22 kW) Light Six rode on a 128 in (3251 mm) wheelbase and the 41 hp (31 kW) Supreme Six on 130 in (3302 mm), offering a range of body styles: 3 seat roadster, 5, 6, and 7 passenger tourer, and 7 passenger limousine.

In 1916, the Thoroughbred Six sold for US$2,875, the Minute Man Six tourer US$1,185 and convertible sedan US$1,350. Both offered electric horns. For 1919, new enclosed bodies were marketed with names like Coupelet, Sedanette, and Salon Sedan all with six-cylinder engines and a 122 in (3099 mm) wheelbase.

There were two series of 1921 and 1922 Lexingtons: Series S, a 47 hp (35 kW) six-cylinder on a 122 in (3099 mm) wheelbase, and Series T, a 60 hp (45 kW) six on a 128 in (3251 mm) wheelbase. Body styles included 5 and 7 passenger tourer, sedan, coupe, and sedanette, and 7 passenger Salon Sedan.

In 1924 and 1925, Lexington again offered two versions: the Concord, a 65 hp (48 kW) six on a 119 in (3023 mm) wheelbase, and the Minute Man, a 72 hp (54 kW) six on a 123 in (3124 mm) wheelbase. Body styles included 5 and 7 passenger tourer, sedan, and coupe, 5 passenger Royal Coach, and 5 passenger Brougham.

In 1926 and 1927, Lexington offered the Model 6-50, with the same engine and wheelbase as the Concord, in 4 passenger roadster or landaulet, and a 5-passenger phaeton, sedan, or landau sedan.

== Production totals ==
The following lists the number of Lexington's in each year, from 123 in 1909 up to 6,128 in 1920, followed by a decline to 183 in 1926, the final year.

Year	Sales	Model
1909	123	
1910	625	
1911	939	DF
1912	1,013	DF
1913	1,915	
1914	1,612	
1915	2,814	
1916	3,115	
1917	3,917	
1918	4,123	
1919	3,124	
1920	6,128	
1921	4,236	
1922	2,114	
1923	1,330	
1924	498	
1925	339	
1926	183	
