= Connersville, Indiana =

- City
- City of Connersville
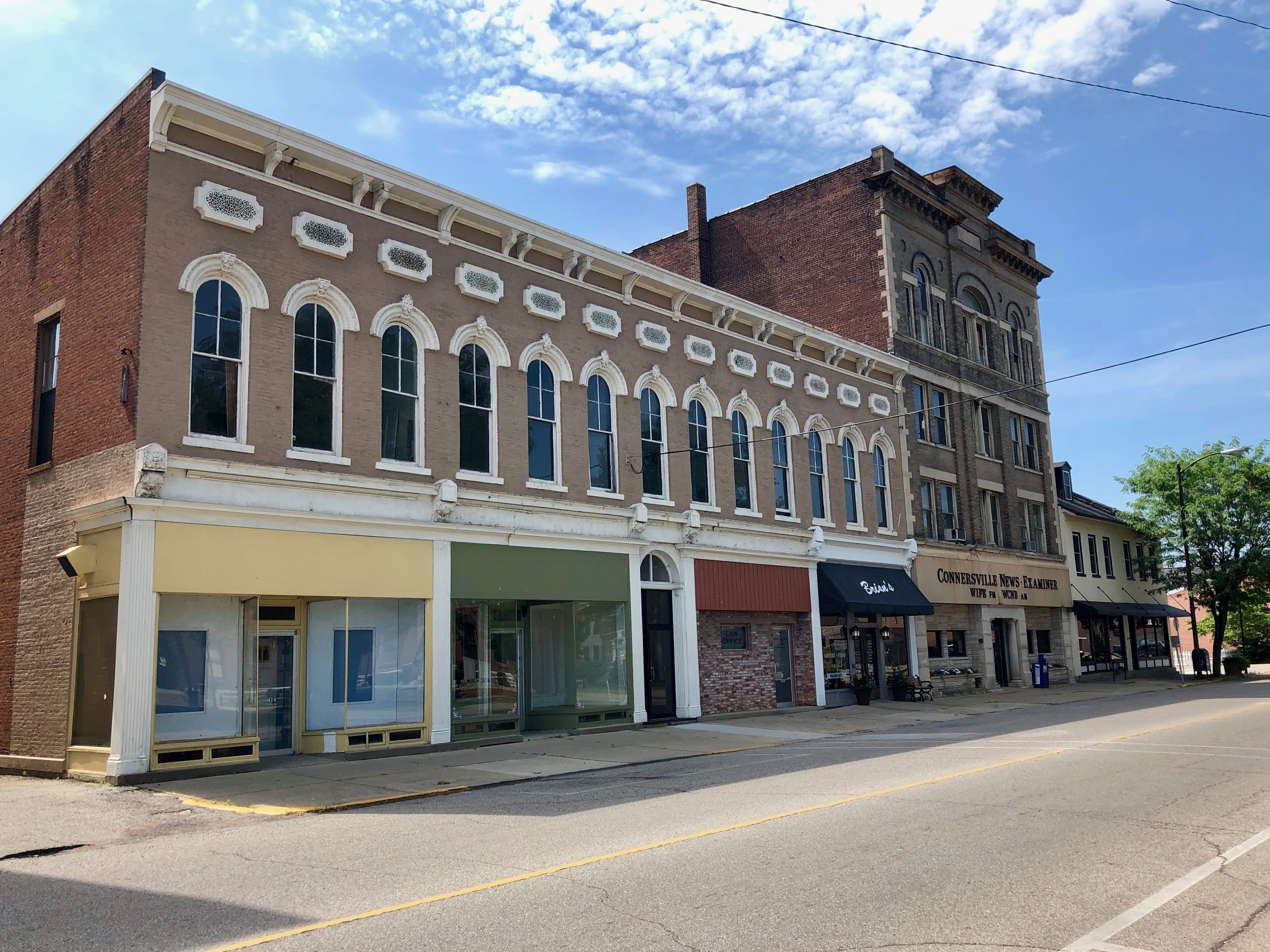
- Central Avenue in Downtown Connersville

- Flag Seal

- Location of Connersville in Fayette County, Indiana.
- Coordinates: 39°38′54″N 85°07′56″W
- Country: United States
- State: Indiana
- County: Fayette

Government
  - Type: Mayor–council
  - Body: Connersville City Council
  - Mayor: Chad Frank (R)

Area
  - Total: 7.70 sq mi (19.94 km^{2})
  - Land: 7.68 sq mi (19.90 km^{2})
  - Water: 0.015 sq mi (0.04 km^{2})
- Elevation: 846 ft (258 m)

Population (2020)
  - Total: 13,324
  - Density: 1,734.4/sq mi (669.67/km^{2})
- Time zone: UTC-5 (EST)
  - Summer (DST): UTC-4 (EDT)
- ZIP code: 47331
- Area code: 765
- FIPS code: 18-14932
- GNIS feature ID: 2393620
- Website: Fayette County/ Connersville Website

Connersville is a city in Fayette County, Indiana, United States, 66 miles (106 km) east by southeast of Indianapolis. The population was 13,324 at the 2020 census. The city is the county seat of and the only incorporated town in the county. The city is in the center of a large rural area of east central Indiana; the nearest significant city is Richmond, 26 miles (42 km) to the northeast by road. Connersville is home to Fayette county's only high school. The local economy relies on manufacturing, retail, and healthcare to sustain itself. However, there has been a consistent decline in both employment and population since the 1960s, placing it among the least affluent areas in the state of Indiana, as indicated by measures such as median household income and other economic indicators.

The city is among the oldest cities in Indiana and the former Indiana Territory, having been established in 1813 by its namesake, John Conner.

== History ==
Connersville is named for settler John Conner, older brother of William Conner, an early Indiana settler and politician. There was also, at least through 1795, Connerstown, a small Shawnee village near Lancaster, Ohio, named for John's father, Richard Conner.

=== Whitewater Valley and pre-European inhabitants ===
The Whitewater River valley running north–south through eastern Indiana and southwestern Ohio was created by the Late Wisconsin Glaciation ending 13,600 years ago. Fayette County was at the southern fringe of the glaciation at that time. The Ice Age was punctuated by several prolonged warm periods during which the glaciers disappeared entirely from the temperate latitudes and a climate similar to modern times or even warmer prevailed. The flood waters produced resulted in lakes; breaching of the lakes resulted in rivers and streams carving its hills and valleys.

In the Northwest Territory during the latter half of the 18th century, the Miami Indians were dominant in the region, but the Potawatomi and Shawnee had a significant presence. Delaware Indians, displaced from their eastern homelands by European settlement, migrated west and settled along the forks of the Whitewater River. The Whitewater and Ohio River valleys had also been inhabited earlier by other Native Americans called mound builders for their characteristic large burial mounds still in evidence.

The geological aspects of the Whitewater River Valley contributed to early settlement after defeat of the Delaware Indians by General Anthony Wayne at Fallen Timbers in 1794, followed on August 3, 1795, by the Treaty of Greenville ceding most of Ohio and a sliver of southeastern Indiana to the United States. The valley, running south and southeasterly from east central Indiana to the Ohio River Valley, provided a convenient conduit for migration through Fort Washington (Cincinnati) from points east, settlements on the Ohio River, and settlers from Kentucky to northern and central Indiana Territory. Squatters engaged in agriculture and trading were occupying federal lands well before land sales in Indiana Territory began in 1801. An Indian trail paralleled the river from the Ohio Valley northward to the forks, then went along the East Fork to Eli Creek, thence taking a northwesterly direction passing through what was later Connersville, and then on to the Delaware villages strung along the White River from north of modern-day Indianapolis to modern Muncie.

=== Conner's Post ===
John Conner, his brother William, and others arrived in the Whitewater Valley from south central Ohio in 1802, establishing a fur trading post in an unpopulated area near what was later to become Cedar Grove on the Whitewater River (Franklin County) at the very fringe of the European penetration into the wilderness of Indiana. By 1808, as a result of reduction of Indian hunting grounds by treaty, the trading post, known as "Conner's Post", had been relocated 20 miles (32 km) north at the Whitewater River junction with an Indian trail between the Ohio River 70 miles (110 km) to the southeast and hunting grounds to the north. According to research by J. L. Heineman, the trading post was located in the middle of what is now Eastern Avenue, at the west end of Charles Street. At that time, the region was inhabited by Delaware Indians. In 1809, the Treaty of Fort Wayne was signed, by the terms of which the land locally known as the "Twelve Mile Purchase" was ceded by the Indians to the government. This tract included a strip twelve miles (19 km) in width lying west of the 1795 Greenville treaty line that ran from the midpoint of the Indiana/Ohio border southwest to the Ohio River, cutting off a thin wedge of southeastern Indiana. The strip included most of Fayette County except the extreme northern portion (part of the later "New Purchase"). Sales of public land by the United States government in Indiana began in 1801. In that year the Cincinnati, Ohio, Land Office began selling land in a wedge of government land in southeastern Indiana known as the "Gore" (organized as Dearborn County in 1803) which included all of what became Fayette County. Conner obtained title to his plat in 1811.

=== First 50 years – through the Civil War ===
The exodus of the Delaware Indians from Indiana after the War of 1812, completed by June 1813, deprived John Conner of his field for trading. After 1812, Indian resistance to settlement in the Indiana Territory became nearly non-existent, so Conner busied himself with another task.

John Conner laid out the town on the north side of the west fork of the Whitewater River in March 1813, adjacent to the fur trading post. The original plat was for 62 lots bounded by what are today Central Avenue to the west and Water Street to the east, Third Street to the south, and Sixth Street to the north. The first constructions in the town were a saw mill and grist mill north of town utilizing water power, and a general store and distillery in town. The influx of settlers was initially sparse – as late as 1815, there were only four cabins in the town. The boundary lines for Fayette County were established in December 1818, and Connersville was chosen as the county seat.

Conner served briefly as sheriff of the newly organized Fayette County. In 1820, he helped plat the new capital of Indianapolis, and in 1822 relocated his fur trading business to Noblesville, north of Indianapolis. He also served as state senator and representative. He died in Indianapolis in April 1826 and was buried there. No trace remains of his grave.

The first post office in Connersville opened in January, 1818. The first courthouse was started in 1819 and finished in 1822. The first newspaper, the Indiana Statesman, was started in 1824. The first church in the village was Presbyterian, constructed in 1824. A seminary building was constructed in 1828, later razed, and the first regular school building in Connersville was constructed on the site in 1858. The Indiana Gazetteer in 1833 stated the population of Connersville as 500. The village was incorporated as a town in 1841. Connersville served as an important link on the Whitewater Canal that opened in1847and connected the Whitewater River and the Ohio River. The canal ceased to be used for through traffic in 1849, though limited local commerce continued. The first railroad, the Cincinnati, Hamilton and Indianapolis Railroad, reached Connersville in 1862. It extended from Rushville through Connersville and Oxford to Hamilton, Ohio.

For many years prior to the Civil War, and even for some time after, the main industries of the town were milling, pork packing, and woolen manufacturing.

In 1857, a separate village, East Connersville, was platted on the south bank of the west fork of the Whitewater River, and had its own government. It was annexed by Connersville some time in the 1920s.

=== Early growth – pre-industrial age ===
The Roots blower, a type of air turbine, was invented by the Roots brothers in Connersville in the 1850s, patented in 1859, and manufactured in Connersville for over 150 years.

The town of Connersville became a chartered city in June 1869, and William H. Beck was chosen as its first mayor. The first high school opened in 1875. In 1882, James H. Fearis of Connersville started the Bell telephone exchange. The Connersville Electric Light Company commenced operations in August 1890 as the first supplier of electric power in the city. Central Avenue was paved with brick in 1902, and became the first paved street in the city.

Prior to the advent of automotive manufacturing, Connersville for decades was colloquially known as the "furniture and buggy town" because of the dominance of those two industries in the town.

In 1898, Stant was founded in Connersville, and became the world's largest producer of piano tuning pins.

During the school year 1906–07, Dr. W. Otto Miessner established the first public high school band in the U.S. at Connersville High School.

=== Automotive and industrial age to 1960s ===
In the early 20th century, the town became known as "Little Detroit" because of its importance to the automobile industry, with over 500,000 jeep bodies produced in the town during the Second World War. Automobile manufacturing in Connersville began as early as 1909 and included Auburn, Cord, Duesenberg, Ansted, Empire, Lexington, and McFarlan. The Willys MB Jeep body was manufactured in Connersville during the 1940s. Much of the western portion of town was occupied by light industry for the 150 years prior to 1990. Companies included Roots Blower (later Dresser Industries), Stant, McQuay-Norris, Design & Manufacturing Co. (D&M), H. H. Robertson, Visteon, and Philco Ford.

McQuay-Norris, manufacturer of auto parts based in St. Louis, got its start in Connersville in 1921 by the acquisition of Wainwright Engineering, a privately held local company manufacturing automotive engines. In 1969, it was acquired by Eaton, Yale & Towne, and closed its Connersville and Indianapolis plants in 1983.

Design & Manufacturing (D&M) company got its start when Rex Regenstrief purchased American Kitchens in 1958 and renamed the company. By 1972, D&M controlled 25% of the nation's dishwasher market. Design & Manufacturing's assets were sold to White Consolidated Industries in 1987 and the firm was dissolved in 1990.

Architectural Products Division of H. H. Robertson purchased land owned by the defunct Lexington Motor Car Company in February 1960. Robertson was a victim of hard times for the industry in the late 1980s and the Connersville plant was merged with operations in Pittsburgh, Pennsylvania, starting in 1986.

=== Decline from 1960s onward ===
The 1980s were the beginning of the end for Connersville automotive manufacturing, which had been on the wane for more than a decade. Due to the high cost of local union labor and economies of scale elsewhere, most industry departed in the 1980s and 1990s. Connersville union labor decreased from a high of 10,000 to about 600 workers in 2012. Connersville's role in automobile manufacturing ceased when the Visteon factory shut down in 2007. Part of the decline may be logistical – with the construction of the interstate highway system in the 1950s, Connersville found itself not directly in line with routes between major cities: Interstate 70 from Indianapolis to Columbus, Ohio, Interstate 74 from Indianapolis to Cincinnati, and U.S. Route 40 from Indianapolis to Richmond, none intersecting Connersville. The former Roots Blower/Dresser Industries, now Ingersoll Rand, retains approximately 200 full-time employees. Stant also remains with a nearly 300 employees. There are still some furniture making, machine shops, and other local manufacturing establishments.

In March 2014, the city declared a fiscal emergency when revenue fell short of expenses, and the city nearly fell into bankruptcy.

In 2023, Nova Circular Solutions announced a $200 million investment into the former Visteon plant to create the first of its kind plastic film recycling center. It is expected to employ close to 200 people by 2026.

== Geography ==
Connersville is oriented roughly north–south. The center of town is roughly Central Avenue and 5th Street in the southern portion.

According to the 2010 census, Connersville has a total area of 7.755 square miles (20.09 km^{2}), of which 7.74 square miles (20.05 km^{2}) (or 99.81%) is land and 0.015 square miles (0.04 km^{2}) (or 0.19%) is water.

== Demographics ==
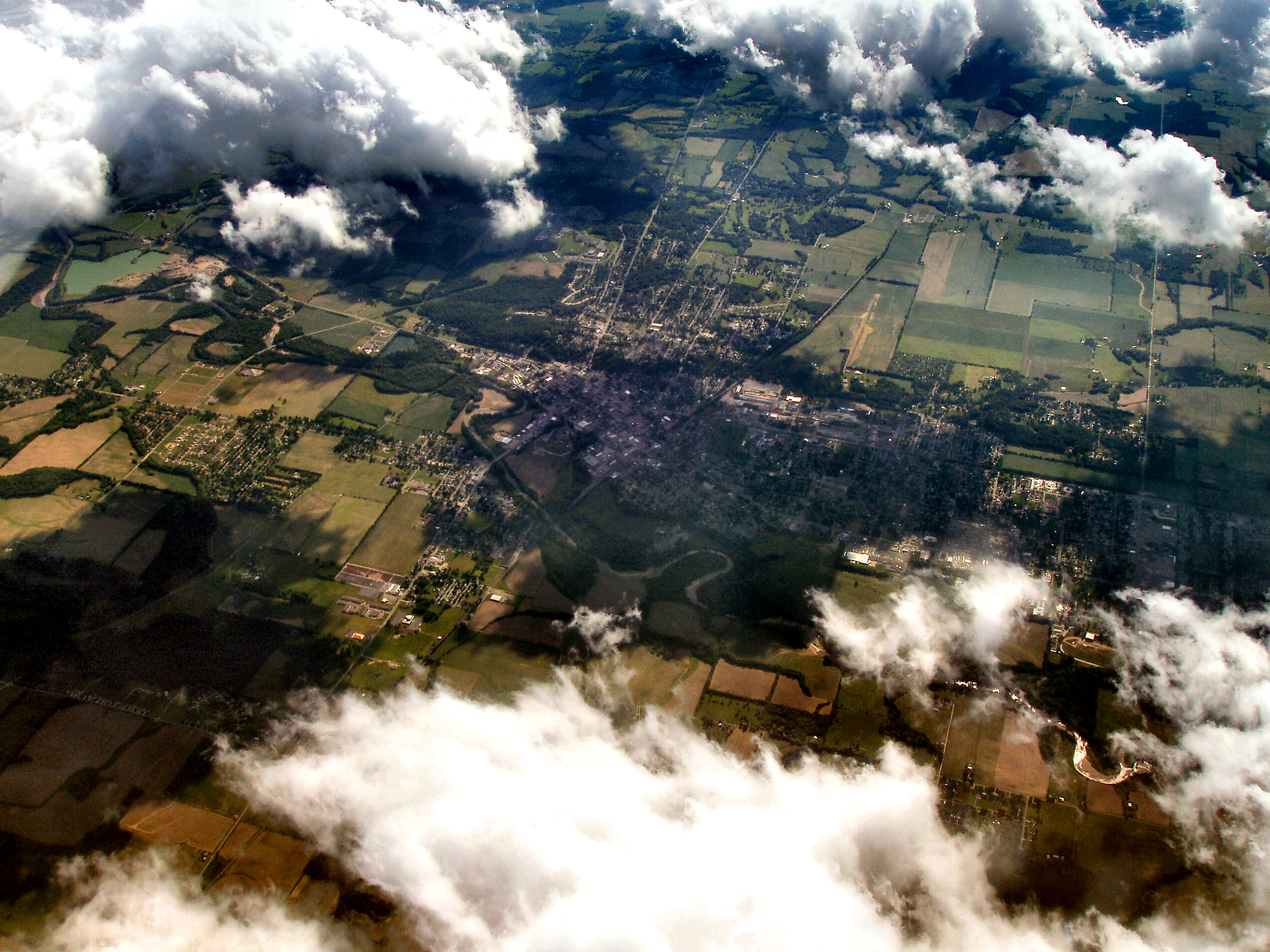
Connersville from the air, looking west. The Whitewater River is in the foreground, and Roberts Park Grandstand and Race Track are at the bottom right. The Park is home to the Fayette County Free Fair, one of the last free fairs remaining in the state.

Historical population
Census	Pop.	Note	%±
1840	596		—
1850	1,396		134.2%
1860	2,119		51.8%
1870	2,496		17.8%
1880	3,228		29.3%
1890	4,548		40.9%
1900	6,836		50.3%
1910	7,738		13.2%
1920	9,901		28.0%
1930	12,795		29.2%
1940	12,898		0.8%
1950	15,550		20.6%
1960	17,698		13.8%
1970	17,604		−0.5%
1980	17,023		−3.3%
1990	15,550		−8.7%
2000	15,411		−0.9%
2010	13,481		−12.5%
2020	13,324		−1.2%
Source: US Census Bureau

=== 2020 census ===
As of the 2020 census, Connersville had a population of 13,324. The median age was 42.0 years. 21.8% of residents were under the age of 18 and 20.5% of residents were 65 years of age or older. For every 100 females there were 92.6 males, and for every 100 females age 18 and over there were 90.8 males age 18 and over.

99.4% of residents lived in urban areas, while 0.6% lived in rural areas.

There were 5,738 households in Connersville, of which 27.3% had children under the age of 18 living in them. Of all households, 35.8% were married-couple households, 21.1% were households with a male householder and no spouse or partner present, and 32.3% were households with a female householder and no spouse or partner present. About 34.1% of all households were made up of individuals and 15.2% had someone living alone who was 65 years of age or older.

There were 6,553 housing units, of which 12.4% were vacant. The homeowner vacancy rate was 3.0% and the rental vacancy rate was 9.3%.

Racial composition as of the 2020 census
Race	Number	Percent
White	12,408	93.1%
Black or African American	221	1.7%
American Indian and Alaska Native	22	0.2%
Asian	35	0.3%
Native Hawaiian and Other Pacific Islander	2	0.0%
Some other race	102	0.8%
Two or more races	534	4.0%
Hispanic or Latino (of any race)	200	1.5%

=== 2010 census ===
As of the census of 2010, there were 13,481 people, 5,582 households, and 3,506 families residing in the city. The population density was 1,739.5 inhabitants per square mile (671.6/km^{2}). There were 6,450 housing units at an average density of 832.3 per square mile (321.4/km^{2}). The racial makeup of the city was 95.7% White, 2.1% African American, 0.2% Native American, 0.3% Asian, 0.3% from other races, and 1.3% from two or more races. Hispanic or Latino of any race were 1.0% of the population.

There were 5,582 households, of which 31.1% had children under the age of 18 living with them, 41.9% were married couples living together, 15.2% had a female householder with no husband present, 5.8% had a male householder with no wife present, and 37.2% were non-families. 31.6% of all households were made up of individuals, and 13.8% had someone living alone who was 65 years of age or older. The average household size was 2.37 and the average family size was 2.95.

The median age in the city was 39.4 years. 24.2% of residents were under the age of 18; 8.2% were between the ages of 18 and 24; 24.3% were from 25 to 44; 25.6% were from 45 to 64; and 17.7% were 65 years of age or older. The gender makeup of the city was 47.7% male and 52.3% female.

=== 2000 census ===
As of the census of 2000, there were 15,411 people, 6,382 households, and 4,135 families residing in the city.

=== Religion ===
About 44% of the population is affiliated with a religious congregation. 25% are Roman Catholic, followed by United Methodist, Southern Baptist, and non-denominational Christian. In town, there are churches representing Catholic, Methodist, Baptist, Lutheran, Presbyterian, Reformed Episcopal and Church of Jesus Christ of Latter-Day Saint faiths, as well as about a dozen non-denominational Christian churches. There are also a number of Pentecostal (including Charismatic and Revival) churches and organizations.

== Culture ==
Fayette County Public Library is located in the city.

A golf course west of town is known as Willowbrook Country Club.

Connersville has an indoor movie theater, Showtime Cinemas.

A football field at the high school on Ranch Road hosts high school events like gymnastics, track and field, etc.

Overnight and long-term camping are available at the Whitewater River Campground south of town. The Heritage MusicFest takes place every year in June at the campground. Local bands ranging in style from bluegrass to rock perform.

=== Parks and preserves ===
Roberts Park, located in the northeast corner of town, contains a public pool, community center, grandstand, and racetrack. It hosts the annual Fayette County Free Fair, a week-long event held late in the summer.

Whitewater Memorial State Park is located adjacent to 5,260-acre (2,130 ha) Brookville Lake about 10 miles (16 km) southeast by east of Connersville near Liberty, Indiana.

Manlove Park, about 8 miles (13 km) northwest of downtown near Milton, is a recreation area around Manlove Lake.

Shrader-Weaver Woods Nature Preserve, about 4 miles (6.4 km) northwest of Connersville, is 108 acres (44 ha) of pristine old growth woodland offering hiking, sightseeing and bird watching.

The Mary Gray Bird Sanctuary, over 700 acres (280 ha) of forest, meadow, prairie, and ponds, provides hiking, picnicking, camping. and bird watching. It is located about 5 miles (8.0 km) southwest of Connersville.

Doc-O-Lake, a 50-acre (20 ha) lake and recreation area 7 miles (11 km) north of town, features camping, boating and limited fishing (not a stocked lake).

=== Cemeteries ===
Connersville City Cemetery in the middle of town, Dale Cemetery just west of downtown, and Tullis Chapel Cemetery 3 miles (4.8 km) southwest of town, are the only local cemeteries. There are a few private and church cemeteries located in outlying unincorporated areas.

=== Historic places ===
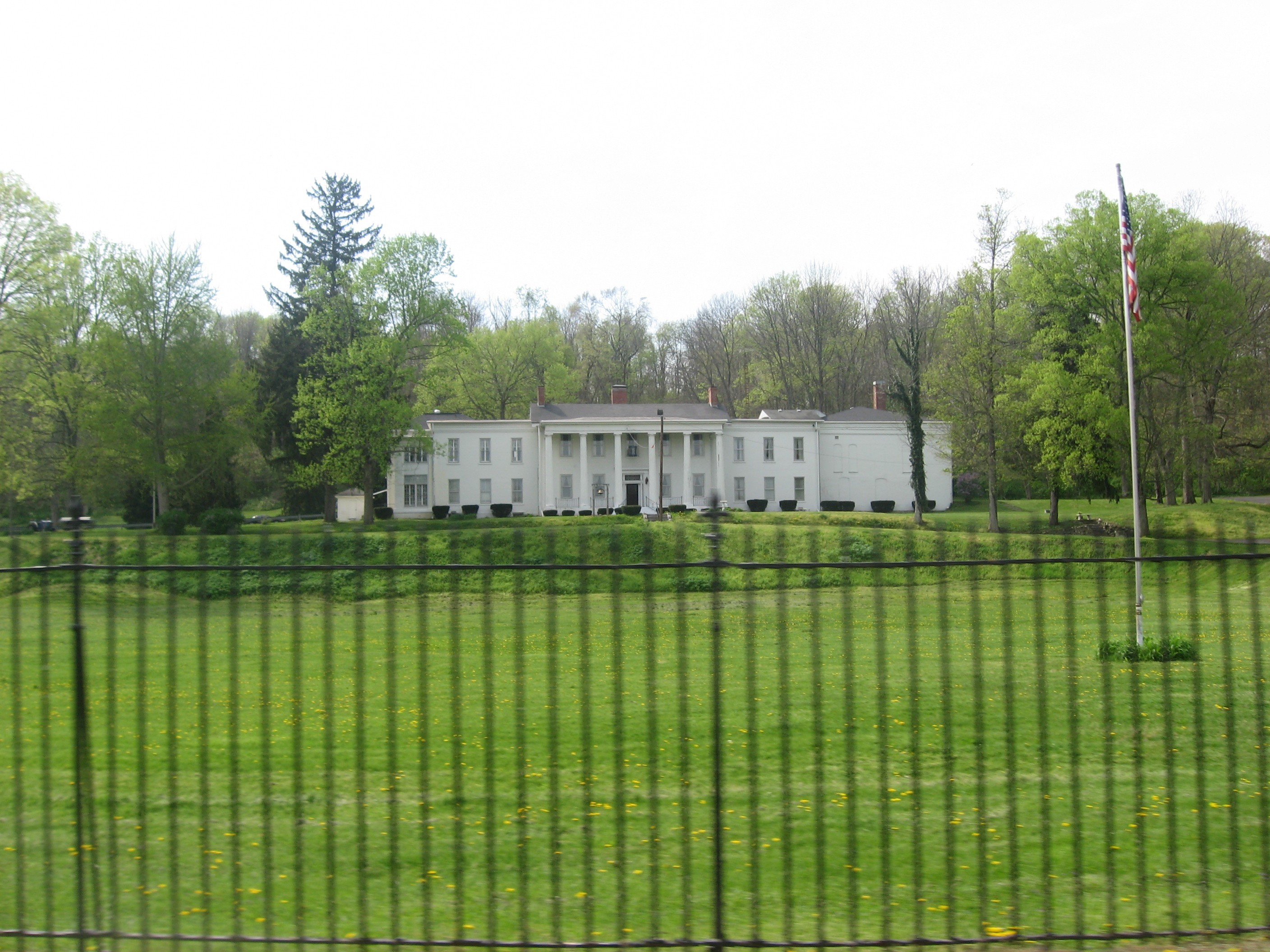
Elmhurst mansion in Connersville, built in 1831

Elmhurst, an estate south of town on State Road 121 and built in 1831, was the home of Caleb Blood Smith, who served in Abraham Lincoln's cabinet. It also serves as the site of an annual re-enactment of the American Civil War. The estate was formerly known as Conners Elm Park.

The Whitewater Valley Railroad is a 19-mile (31 km) long operating scenic railroad and museum between Connersville and Metamora.

Fayette County Historical Museum is located in the city, as is the Canal House, built in 1842 as headquarters for the Whitewater Canal Company,

In addition to the Canal House and Elmhurst, the Fayette County Courthouse and Roberts Park are listed on the National Register of Historic Places.

== Transportation ==
There is no commercial air or bus service to Connersville. There is Amtrak (passenger) and CSX (freight) rail service. The Whitewater River, while mostly navigable, is not commercially viable as a means of transportation.

Freight moves into and out of Connersville by truck, principally via State Road 1 north and Interstate 70 to Indianapolis, and State Road 1 south, U.S. Route 52, and Interstate 74 to Cincinnati. State Road 44 is mostly local and in-county traffic. SR 1 and SR 44 are both narrow two-lane state roads. The nearest large cities are Cincinnati 58 miles (93 km) to the southeast; Indianapolis 66 miles (106 km) to the west; Dayton, Ohio, 60 miles (97 km). to the east; Louisville, Kentucky, 127 miles (204 km) to the south; and Columbus, Ohio, 135 miles (217 km) to the east.

=== Airport ===
Mettel Field is a private aviation airport located three nautical miles (6 km) north of the central business district of Connersville. There is no commercial service. It is owned by the Connersville Board of Aviation Commissioners. The nearest commercial airport is Cincinnati/Northern Kentucky International Airport, 62 miles (100 km) to the southeast.

=== Railroad ===
Amtrak, the national passenger rail system, provides service to Connersville. Each of two trains provides service three days a week. The westbound train provides service to Indianapolis, Lafayette, and Chicago. The eastbound train provides service to Cincinnati, cities in Kentucky, and points east ending at New York City.

=== Bus and taxi service ===
There is no transit bus service to Connersville, but local public transit is available to all residents by calling the public transit office. There is 1 local taxi service in town.

=== Highways ===
- Indiana State Road 1 runs north–south through downtown Connersville north to beyond Fort Wayne and south to Lawrenceburg
- Indiana State Road 44 runs east–west through downtown Connersville west to Martinsville and east to the Ohio state line
- Indiana State Road 121 runs north–south from intersection with SR44 in downtown Connersville south to Metamora
- Interstate 70, 14 miles (23 km) to the north via SR1 runs east–west from Indianapolis to Columbus, Ohio
- U.S. Route 40, 12 miles (19 km) to the north via SR1 runs east–west from just south of Indianapolis to Richmond, IN

== Education ==
All public schools belong to the Fayette County School Corporation. There are about 1,200 students in high school, 700 in middle school, 1,800 in public elementary schools, and 300 in parochial elementary schools (as of 2012). Public elementary schools and some parochial elementary schools include kindergarten. The Whitewater Technical Career Center is a secondary school including grades 10–12 with an enrollment of over 500; it prepares non-college-bound students for careers in the trades. There are no institutions of higher learning in Connersville. The Connersville Center offers extension courses through Indiana University East. The nearest four-year colleges are IU East and Earlham College in Richmond, Indiana, and Miami University in Oxford, Ohio, all about 25 miles (40 km) away by road.

The Fayette County School Corporation garnered national attention in November 2017 with a series of articles on CBS News on the subject of school nutrition programs, nationwide—featuring Connersville schools' partnership with a food service company, Chartwell's, to offer free breakfast, lunch and supper services to all children in their schools—integrating breakfasts with classroom learning activity, offering a "second chance" breakfast for teens, and providing after-school movies with a free supper.

=== Middle, high and trade schools ===
- Connersville High School
- Connersville Middle School (formerly Junior High North formerly Connersville Sr. High)
- Whitewater Career Center (formerly Connersville Area Vocational School)

=== Elementary schools ===
- Eastview
- Grandview
- Frazee
- Fayette Central
- Everton

=== Parochial elementary schools ===
- St. Gabriel's (Catholic)
- Community (Christian)
- Faith (Christian)

== Healthcare ==
Reid Health operates the hospital and associated entities in Connersville, having purchased most of the assets of the former Fayette Regional Health System after it filed for bankruptcy in 2018.

== Media ==
Connersville has a daily newspaper called The News Examiner in continuous publication (including predecessor papers) since 1849.

Radio station WLPK-AM 1580, owned by Rodgers Broadcasting Corporation and licensed to Connersville, operates with local programming and a classic hits format; the station simulcasts on FM frequency 106.9. For many years Connersville simulcast AM/FM WCNB/WIFE radio. The FM which was located at 100.3 was sold to Radio One Communications for $18 million in 2006 and re-located to Cincinnati, Ohio. There is now a WIFE-FM radio station (94.3), whose tower is located in Rush County, Indiana.

Connersville High School's daily TV news program, CHS Today, was the first student-produced TV news program in the United States. It began in 1970 with presenters Dennis Sullivan and Ron Stevens. At first, it was broadcast only to the school via closed-circuit TV. Later it expanded and now airs live at 11:00 a.m. weekdays to the community and re-airs twice in the evening at 6:45 and 10:45pm via TV3 on local cable.

== Notable people ==
- E. L. Cord, Industrialist and automaker and founded American Airlines in Dallas, Texas.
- Howard Garns, creator of the logic game Sudoku, was born in Connersville on March 2, 1905.
- Finly H. Gray was a US Congressman for Indiana's 6th and 10th Districts.
- Scott Halberstadt, television actor, born in Connersville
- Tom T. Hall, country singer and Grand Ole Opry member, spent time in Connersville early in his career.
- Matt Howard, basketball player and 2007 graduate of Connersville High School.
- Bill Hunt, racing driver, born in Connersville
- James N. Huston, Treasurer of the United States 1889–1891.
- Louis Ludlow, U.S. representative for Indiana; known for proposing the Ludlow Amendment to the Constitution
- Virginia Claypool Meredith, "Queen of American Agriculture," born in Connersville
- Louis T. Michener, Indiana Attorney General (1886–1890), campaign manager for Benjamin Harrison.
- Caleb Blood Smith, Congressman and the Secretary of the Interior in the Lincoln administration.
- Oliver H. Smith was a Congressman and Senator.
- Joey Sturgis, music producer, sound engineer, musician, drummer.
- Dan Toler, rock musician with the Allman Brothers Band and Gregg Allman Band
- Robert Wise, Hollywood director and producer, graduated from Connersville High School in 1932.

== See also ==
- Connersville Township, Fayette County, Indiana
