= Kellner =

Kellner is a German surname literally meaning "waiter". Notable people with the surname include:

- Ádám Kellner (born 1986), Hungarian tennis player
- Alex Kellner (1924–1996), baseball pitcher
- Alexander Kellner (born 1961), Brazilian paleontologist
- Birgit Kellner, Austrian Buddhologist and Tibetologist
- Carl Kellner (optician) (1829–1855), German optician
- Carl Kellner (mystic) (1851–1905), Austrian mystic, founder of Ordo Templi Orientis
- Catherine Kellner (born 1970), American actress
- Dan Kellner (born 1976), American fencer and graphic designer
- Donald Ferdinand Kellner (1879–1935), Canadian politician
- Douglas Kellner (born 1943), American philosopher
- Ernest Augustus Kellner (1792–1839), British singer and pianist
- Esther Kellner (1908–1998), American author
- Friedrich Kellner (1885–1970), Justice Inspector and Nazi opponent
- Gyula Kellner (1871–1940), Hungarian athlete
- Jamie Kellner, American television executive
- Ján Kellner, S.J. (1912–1941), Slovak Catholic priest and missionary to USSR
- Johann Christoph Kellner (1736–1803), German composer, son of Johann Peter Kellner
- Johann Peter Kellner (1705–1772), German composer, father of Johann Christoph Kellner
- Leon Kellner (1859–1928), Grammarian, Shakespearean, and Zionist
- Lorenz Kellner (1811–1892), German educator
- Larry Kellner (born 1959), American businessman
- Micah Kellner (born 1978), American politician
- Michael Kellner (born 1977), German politician
- Oscar Kellner (1851–1911), German agronomist
- Paul Kellner (1890–1972), German swimmer
- Peter Kellner (born 1946), British journalist
- Petr Kellner (1964–2021), Czech businessman and wealthiest person in the Czech Republic
- Rosa Kellner (1910–1984), German athlete
- Saville Kellner (born 1961), South-African–American entrepreneur
- Uwe Kellner (born 1966), German rower
- Walt Kellner (1929–2006), American Major League Baseball player
- William Kellner (1900–1996), British-Austrian art director

== See also ==
- Kelner
