= Beeson Covered Bridge =

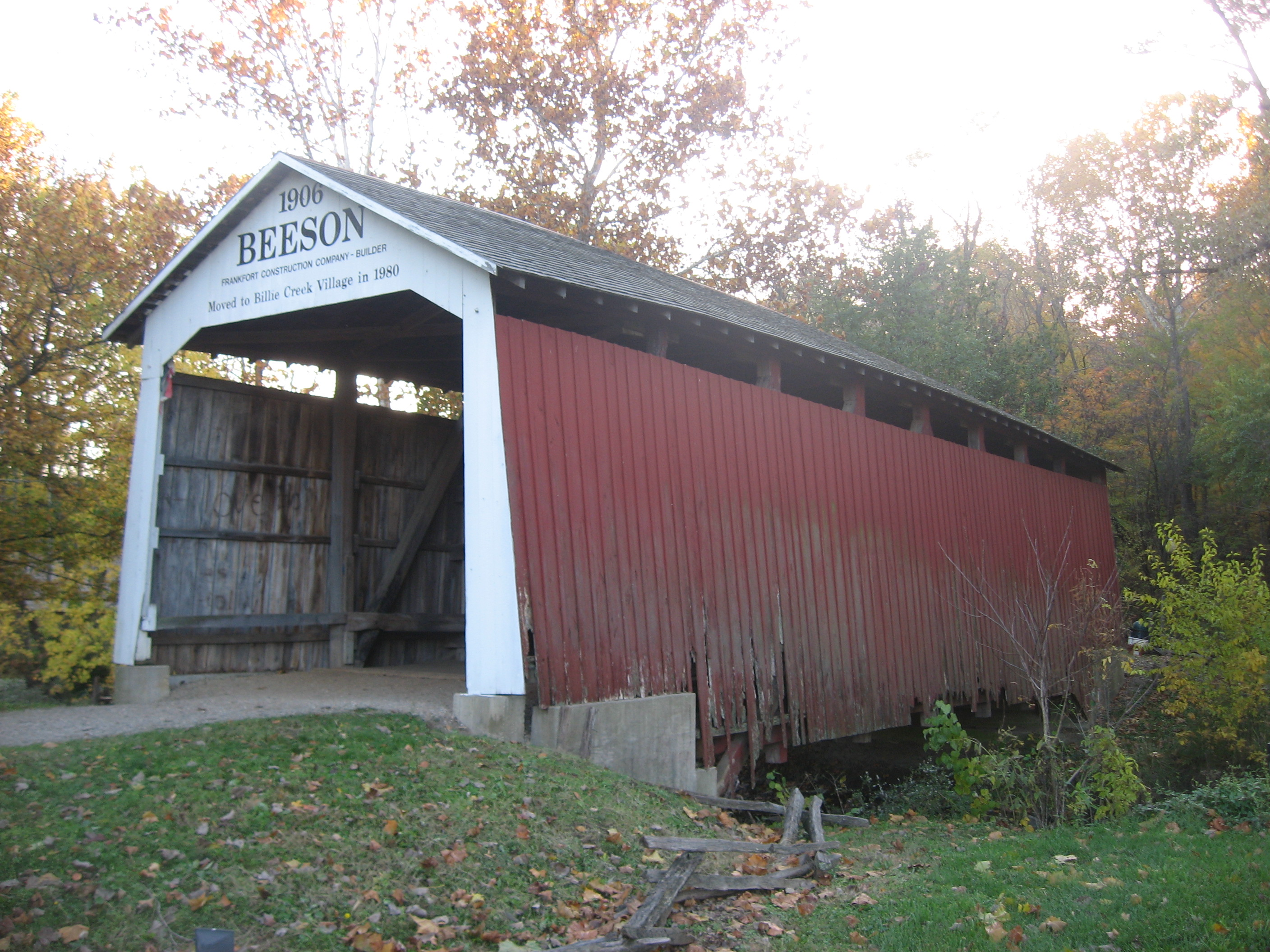
- Beeson Covered Bridge in Billie Creek Village
- Coordinates: 39°45′47.68″N 87°12′23.18″W
- Carries: Pedestrian traffic (Not open to vehicular traffic)
- Crosses: William's Creek
- Locale: Rockville, Adams Township, Parke County, Indiana
- Official name: Beeson Bridge
- Named for: The Beeson Family
- WGCB #: 14-61-24

Characteristics
- Design: Burr arch truss bridge
- Material: Concrete (foundations)
- Trough construction: Wood
- Total length: 55 ft (16.8 m)
- Width: 16 ft (4.9 m)
- No. of spans: 1
- Clearance above: 12.5 ft (3.8 m)
- Beeson Covered Bridge (#38)
- U.S. National Register of Historic Places
- U.S. Historic district – Contributing property
- Location within Parke County, Indiana Location within Indiana Location within the United States
- Built: 1906
- Built by: Frankfort Construction Company
- Website: Beeson Bridge
- Part of: Parke County Covered Bridges TR (ID64000193)
- NRHP reference No.: 78003447
- Added to NRHP: December 22, 1978

Location
- Interactive map of Beeson Covered Bridge

The Beeson Covered Bridge originally crossed Roaring Creek, one mile (1.6 km) northwest of Marshall, Indiana, on County Road 216, in Washington Township, Parke County. The bridge was moved to its current location in Billie Creek Village in December 1979.

== Construction ==
The Beeson Covered Bridge is a single span Burr Arch covered bridge structure that was built by the Frankfort Construction Company in 1906. The bridge is 55 feet (17 m) long, 16 feet (4.9 m) wide, with a clearance of 12 feet 6 inches (3.81 m). The bridge had concrete foundations when it was built and was placed on concrete foundations when it was moved, but after a flood in 1989, the bridge was reset on creosoted wood.

== History ==
Many of the bridges in Parke County are named after a nearby city or the body of water they cross but due to another bridge across the county being named the Marshall Covered Bridge it was named after the nearby Beeson family. William H. Beeson, who was born in 1879, owned 53 acres of land near the bridge. It crossed Roaring Creek on C.R. 216, which is now C.R. 200N. Using the map that Parke County sent when filing for NRHP status, the bridge was originally located at: 39.859715°N 87.197165°W.

The bridge was closed in 1969, because the abutments were declared unsafe. In March 1979, a nearby concrete bridge collapsed. This, along with the earlier closing of the Beeson Covered Bridge, caused a severe problem with access to Marshall, and nearby Turkey Run High School and Turkey Run State Park. The Roaring Creek Citizens Association (RCCA) was formed to address this problem.

At 11:47 pm on August 9, 1979, just shortly after the RCCA had a meeting at Turkey Run High School, a fire was reported at the Beeson Bridge. Firefighters from Marshall, fought from the south end while firefighters from Bloomingdale, fought from the north end of the bridge. The fire was found to be a clear case of arson, fuel oil odors were still strong the following morning. The Parke County Sheriff's Department, Indiana State Police Department and the Indiana State Fire Marshal all were part of the investigation, owing that it is a registered national landmark the FBI probably had jurisdiction too but declined to join. Due to the fire happening so close to the RCCA meeting the RCCA threatened legal action with anyone accusing them of being connected with the fire.

Less than a week later another fire was started just after midnight on August 15, 1979. A nearby neighbor saw someone at the bridge and heard a car turn around in his driveway. Shortly after that he saw flames at the bridge and contacted the Fire Department. The Marshall Fire Department found the bridge floor covered in flames but was quickly able to extinguish them.

On December 4, 1979, the Buchta Trucking Company began moving the bridge to its current location over Williams Creek, in Billie Creek Village, Rockville. They first removed the roof and sides before transporting the rest of the bridge.

== Gallery ==
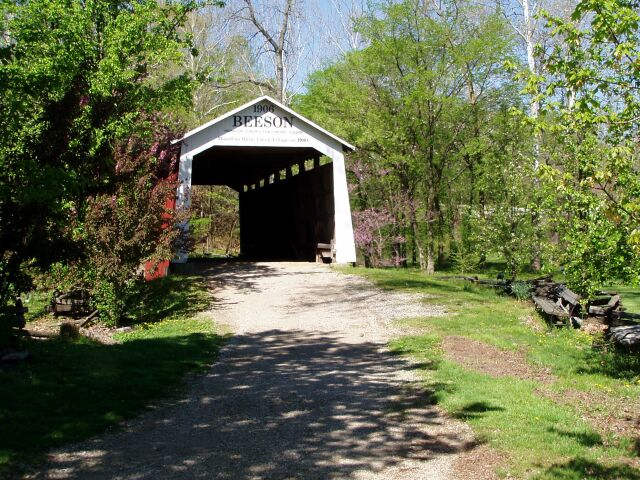
Beeson Covered Bridge at Billie Creek Village

== See also ==
- Billie Creek Village
- Arch in the Town of Marshall
- Lusk Home and Mill Site, within Turkey Run State Park
- Richard Lieber Log Cabin, within Turkey Run State Park
- Parke County Covered Bridges
- List of Registered Historic Places in Indiana
- Parke County Covered Bridge Festival

== Bibliography ==
- "Beeson Covered Bridge (#38)". Parke County Incorporated / Parke County Convention and Visitors Commission. Archived from the original on April 22, 2020.
