= Ben Kilner =

Ben Kilner may refer to:

- Ben Kilner (snowboarder) (born 1988), Scottish professional snowboarder
- Ben Kilner (rugby league) (born 1999), British former professional rugby league footballer
