= Kilner =

Kilner is a surname, and may refer to:

- Andy Kilner (born 1966), English footballer and manager
- Barron Kilner (1852–1922), English rugby union player
- Ben Kilner (snowboarder) (born 1988), Scottish snowboarder
- Ben Kilner (rugby league) (born 1999), British rugby league footballer
- Cecil Francis Kilner (1883–1925), English aviator and pilot
- Clare Kilner (born 1993), English film director
- Dorothy Kilner (1755–1836), British author of children's books
- Francis Kilner (1851–1921), Anglican suffragan bishop
- John Kilner (1792–1857), English founder of the Kilner jar company
- John Kilner (born 1952), American bioethicist
- Kevin Kilner (born 1958), American actor
- Mary Ann Kilner (1753–1831), English writer of children's books
- Norman Kilner (1895–1979), English cricketer
- Rebecca Kilner (born 1971), British evolutionary biologist
- Roy Kilner (1890–1928), English cricketer
- Thomas Kilner (1890–1964), British plastic surgeon
- Walter John Kilner (1847–1920), British doctor who investigated the "aura"

== See also ==
- Kilner jar
- Kelner
- Culbone, a hamlet in Somerset, England, sometimes called Kilner
