= Turkey Run State Park =

State park and historic place in Indiana, U.S.

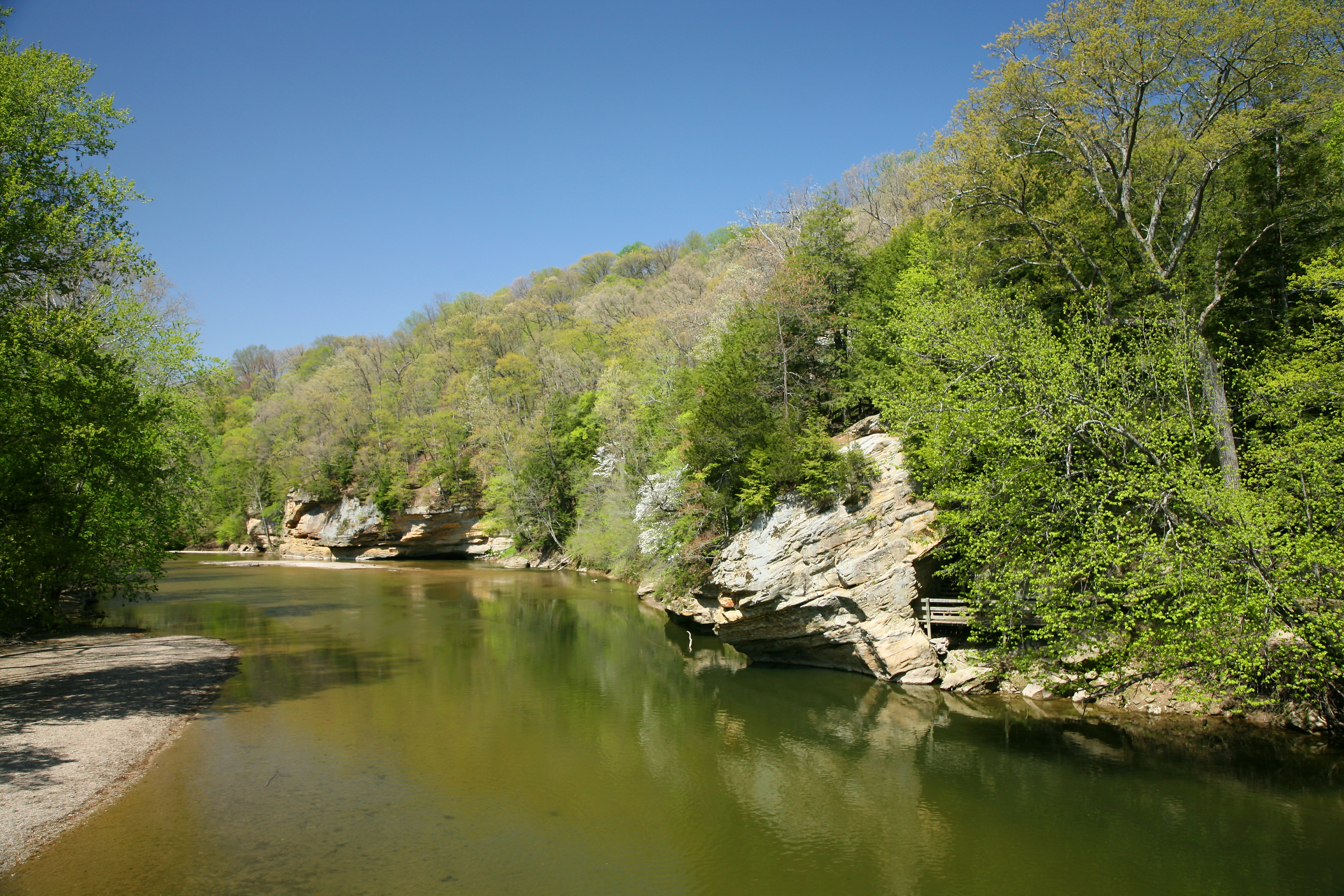
- Sugar Creek in Turkey Run State Park

- Location within Indiana
- Type: State park
- Location: Parke County, Indiana, United States
- Nearest city: Marshall, Indiana
- Coordinates: 39°53.1′N 87°12.2′W
- Area: 2,382 acres (964 ha)
- Created: 1916
- Operator: Indiana Department of Natural Resources
- Visitors: 706,323 (in 2018–2019)
- Website: Official Website

Turkey Run State Park, Indiana's second state park, is in Parke County in the west-central part of the state along State Road 47, 2 miles (3.2 km) east of U.S. 41.

The first parcel of land was purchased for $40,200 in 1916, when Indiana's state park system was established during the state's centennial anniversary of its statehood. The origin of the name "Turkey Run" is unknown, but the most accepted theory is that wild turkeys would congregate for warmth in the gorges (or "runs"), where early settlers could easily trap and hunt them.

The Lusk Home and Mill Site and the Richard Lieber Log Cabin within the park's grounds were included as individual sites on the National Register of Historic Places in 1974 and 2001, respectively. The park itself was listed on the National Register of Historic Places in 2019. Turkey Run also includes a system of trails, Rocky Hollow Falls Canyon Nature Preserve, a suspension bridge across Sugar Creek, camping sites, and other recreational areas. The Turkey Run Inn was built in 1919. Several guest cabins near the inn date from the 1930s and 1940s. The park draws some 700,000 visitors annually.

The park is 1 of 14 Indiana State Parks that were in the path of totality for the 2024 solar eclipse, with the park experiencing 43 seconds of totality.

== History ==
Map of the local area

=== Early settlement ===
The land that would become Turkey Run is the traditional territory of the Kiikaapoi, Peoria, Potawatomi and Myaamia Native American peoples. France was the first European nation to claim control over the area which was followed by the British as a result of the signing of the Treaty of Paris in 1763. Although the area in northern Parke County, Indiana, was once called Bloomingdale Glens, it is better known as Turkey Run. The origins of the nickname is uncertain, but it is believed to be due to the large number of wild turkeys in the area that took refuge for warmth in the gorges (or "runs"), which made it easy for early settlers to trap and hunt them.

The first white occupants of this wooded area was the Captain Salmon Lusk family. Salmon Lusk was a native of Vermont who served under William Henry Harrison at the Battle of Tippecanoe in 1811. Captain Lusk received a tract of land at Turkey Run for his military service. His son, John, later inherited the property. Over the years, John Lusk received offers from lumber companies to sell the forested land, but he was a nature-lover and refused their offers. In 1882, however, he allowed the Indianapolis, Decatur, and Springfield Railroad to establish a summer resort on the property. The resort remained in operation until John Lusk's death in 1915.

=== Preservation ===
In April 1915, after learning that the forested area at Turkey Run would be sold at public auction in May, Parke County resident Juliet V. Strauss, who was a newspaper and magazine columnist for the Rockville Tribune, the Indianapolis News, and the Ladies' Home Journal, reportedly wrote a letter to Indiana governor Samuel M. Ralston urging him to save 2,382 acres (964 hectares) from timber harvesting. Strauss's letter to Governor Ralston is believed to have prompted his decision to establish a Turkey Run Commission, which was assigned the task of preserving the forest. On April 27, 1915, the governor appointed Strauss to serve as a member of the commission along with William W. Woollen of Indianapolis and Vida Newsom of Columbus, Indiana. Richard Lieber, who was appointed chairman of the State Parks Memorial Committee of the Indiana Historical Commission, also became interested in preserving Turkey Run as part of a new state park system.

In November 1915, Lieber met with Governor Ralston to discuss the idea of creating a state parks system as a permanent memorial to Indiana's centennial anniversary of statehood. Governor Ralston agreed to the proposal and appointed Lieber to the Turkey Run Commission in January 1916. (The Turkey Run Commission later merged with the Indiana Historical Commission's State Parks Memorial Committee.) The state parks committee agreed to take on the task of establishing a state parks system in 1916 as part of Indiana's centennial celebrations and hoped to raise funds from private donations to purchase three tracts of land. With the support of state government officials and the Indiana Historical Commission, state parks supporters launched a public campaign to increase awareness and persuade members of the public to donate funds to purchase the land at Turkey Run. (The state legislature had not appropriated funds for land acquisition.) The Indiana Historical Commission and the state parks committee set a target goal of obtaining $25,000 from private citizens and Governor Ralston designated the week of April 24, 1916, to collect the donated funds. The effort acquired about $20,000 in private donations for the purchase of the Turkey Run land.

=== State park ===
Despite its efforts, state park advocates failed in their initial attempt to secure the Turkey Run property for the new state park system. When the public auction took place on May 18, 1916, the Hoosier Veneer Company of Indianapolis, Indiana, made the successful bid to acquire the land for $30,200, surpassing the Indiana Historical Commission's final bid of $30,100. Undeterred, Richard Lieber began negotiations with the lumber company and reached an agreement to purchase the land for $40,200 on November 11, 1916. Money to buy the land from the lumber company largely came from private donations that included a $5,065 contribution from the Indianapolis Motor Speedway Association. Auto racing enthusiast Arthur C. Newby gave another $5,000 to assist with the purchase. While negotiations with the Hoosier Veneer Company were underway, Lieber and the state parks committee bought McCormick's Creek Canyon in Owen County, Indiana, at auction on May 25, 1916. McCormick's Creek State Park became Indiana's first state park. When the state finally acquired Turkey Run in November 1916, the Parke County property became Indiana's second state park. Turkey Run State Park was listed on the National Register of Historic Places in 2019.

== Locale ==
Turkey Run State Park is located about 5 miles (8.0 km) southwest of Shades State Park. Both parks are located along Sugar Creek, and both feature a gorge system formed by the drainage of the creek as it cuts down through sandstone bedrock. Mansfield sandstone is the specific type seen at Turkey Run, named after Mansfield, Indiana. Travel between the two parks crosses a flat glacial till plain and enters the gorge system. The Punchbowl on Turkey Run's Trail 3 is an example of a pothole that was scoured out by glacial erratics caught in swirling backwash.

== Trails ==
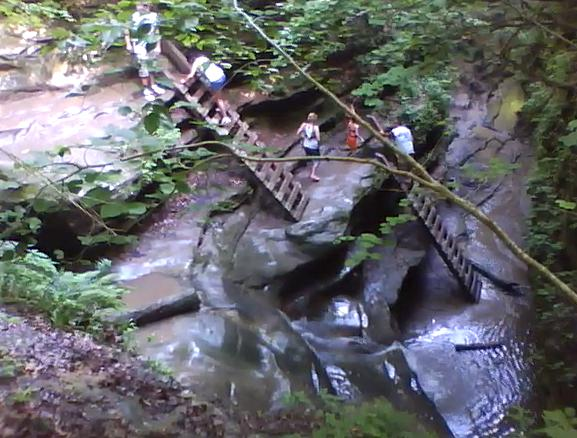
Ladders of Trail 3

A system of trails offers hikers plenty of outing opportunities during the summer months when the drainage is relatively free of water. A suspension footbridge across Sugar Creek, the main drainage for Turkey Run and Shades state parks, provides pedestrian access to trails on the far side. Turkey Run's Trail 3 is particularly noted for its ruggedness, including ladders and narrow but deep gorges. Floating down Sugar Creek through the park in either inner tubes, canoes, or kayaks is very popular in the summer months. There are 3-mile (4.8 km), 8-mile (13 km), and 11-to-15-mile (18 to 24 km) trips down Sugar Creek. In the spring, when heavy rains and snow melt flood the narrow gorges, more adventurous hikers go "creek stomping" through the narrow gorges; however, the fast-moving current, steep gorge walls, and unpredictable contours of the creek beds make this activity dangerous if the water level is high.

== Park geology ==
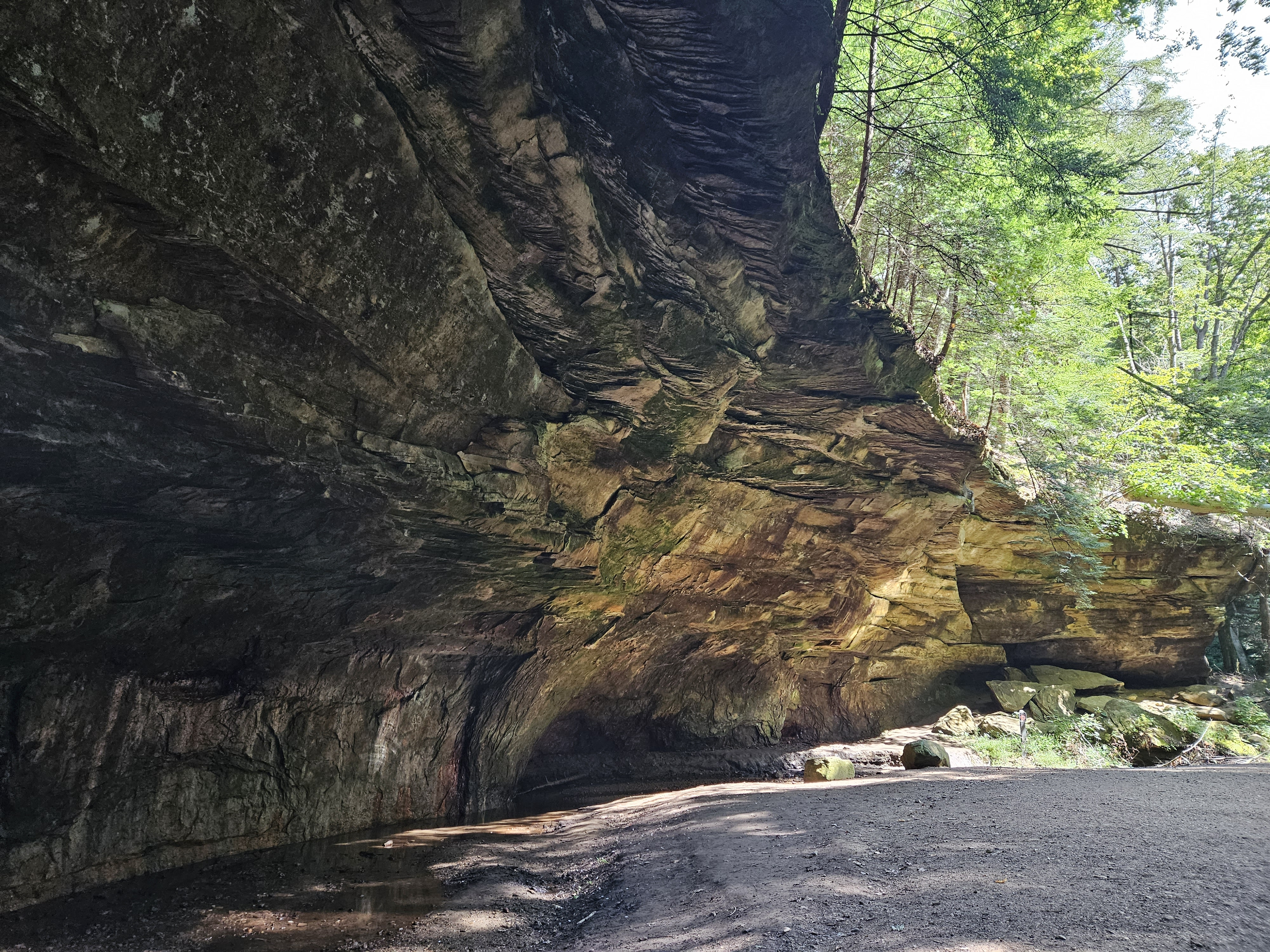
Sandstone gorges are a common sight at Turkey Run

The major features of the park are formed from erosion in Mansfield sandstone from the Mansfield formation. This formation was deposited during the Carboniferous period at the mouth of the ancient riverbed, where sediments collected and compacted. This swampy environment formed coal deposits that were mined in the late 19th and early 20th centuries. A collapsed entrance to a coal mine is still a major feature of the park.

During the Pleistocene Epoch, glacial meltwaters and their associated erosion carved the Mansfield sandstone bedrock into its distinct, present-day formations. Turkey Run's terrain also includes many common features of glaciation such as glacial erratics, till, and scoured canyons caused by erosion from melting glacial waters.

== Rocky Hollow Falls Canyon Nature Preserve ==
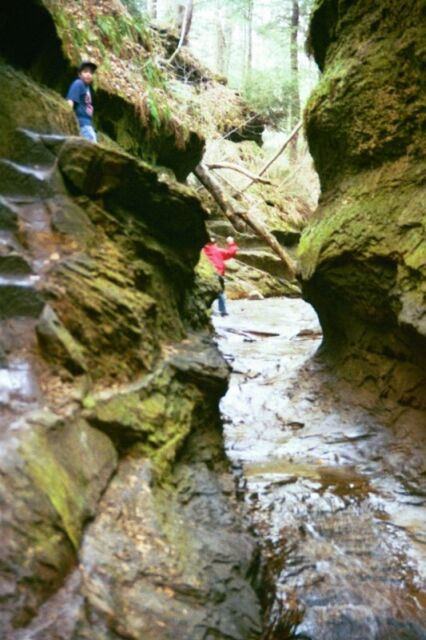
Rocky Hollow Nature Preserve

Rocky Hollow Falls Canyon Nature Preserve is a series of canyons cut into the sandstone. Rocky Hollow is the longest canyon and Falls Canyon has the only existing waterfall (seasonal) in the park. There are six designated trails through the preserve, each with its own unique micro-climate. Depending on the season, these trails may be impassable, muddy, or refreshing on a hot afternoon. The park's suspension footbridge, originally built in 1917–18 across Sugar Creek, leads to the Rocky Hollow Falls Canyon Nature Preserve.

Rocky Hollow begins at 680 feet (210 m) above sea level on the northeast border of the park (County Road 280E) and drops to 540 feet (160 m) at Sugar Creek just above the suspension bridge. Bear Hollow and Falls Canyon drop a similar distance but in one-half or one-third of the length, respectively. The nature preserve was designated a National Natural Landmark in 1974.

== Lusk Home and Mill Site ==
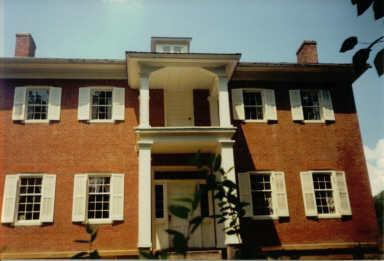
The Lusk Home

The Lusk Home and Mill Site is one of the individual sites within the park that is listed on the National Register of Historic Places. The initial area that became Turkey Run State Park developed around the Lusk home, which was built in 1841 by Salmon Lusk. He also built a mill on the site in 1826. The Lusk home and mill site were added to the National Register on October 29, 1974.

== Lieber Log Cabin ==
- Richard Lieber Log Cabin
- U.S. National Register of Historic Places
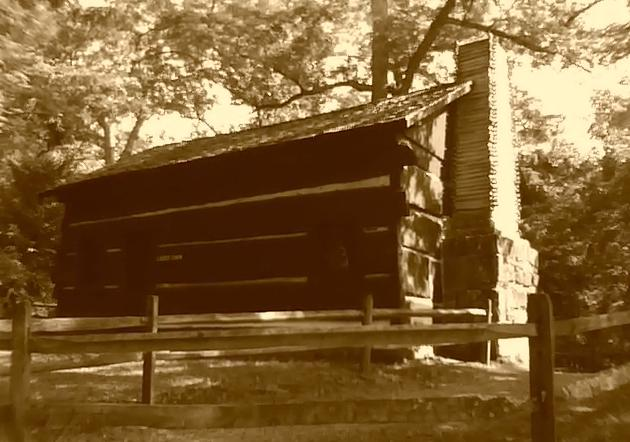
- Richard Lieber Cabin, September 2012

- Location within Parke County, Indiana Location within Indiana Location within the United States
- Location: Marshall, Indiana
- Coordinates: 39°53′4.24″N 87°12′24.37″W
- Architect: Daniel Gay, Richard Lieber
- NRHP reference No.: 01000403
- Added to NRHP: May 4, 2001

The Richard Lieber Log Cabin is another of the individual sites at Turkey Run that is listed on the National Register of Historic Places. It was built in 1848 from native tulip trees, the oldest of its kind in Indiana. Lieber Cabin was added to the National register on May 4, 2001.

The cabin is named in honor of Colonel Richard Lieber, the first director of Indiana's state parks system and the conservationist who advocated for its creation as a permanent memorial to Indiana'scentennial anniversary of statehood. Lieber discovered the cabin during a thunderstorm in 1918 and convinced the owner to have it moved 3 miles (4.8 km) so it could serve as the administration building for the state park. All but the chimney was salvageable. An elderly man familiar with the chimney's "cat and clay" style gave directions for making a new one using stone from an old bridge. The supports were originally of butternut, but are now of sassafras. The present-day cabin houses a museum honoring Lieber and the Indiana state park system. Lieber died at McCormicks Creek State Park in 1944 and his ashes were buried at the base of the Colonel Richard Lieber Memorial at Turkey Run.

== Other features ==
Campsites at Turkey Run were first developed in 1964. The state park also includes Turkey Run Inn and cabins for overnight guests. The two-story inn was designed by Bishop, Knowlton and Carson architects and constructed circa 1919. Additions were completed in 1930, 1940, and circa 1970. The Civilian Conservation Corps built five double cabins near the inn in 1941; two family cabins were built near a maintenance shed on the property and date from the 1930s. The CCC also built a Nature Center at Turkey Run in 1942. The center originally served as a commissary. Its exterior was remodeled in 1986.

== Gallery ==
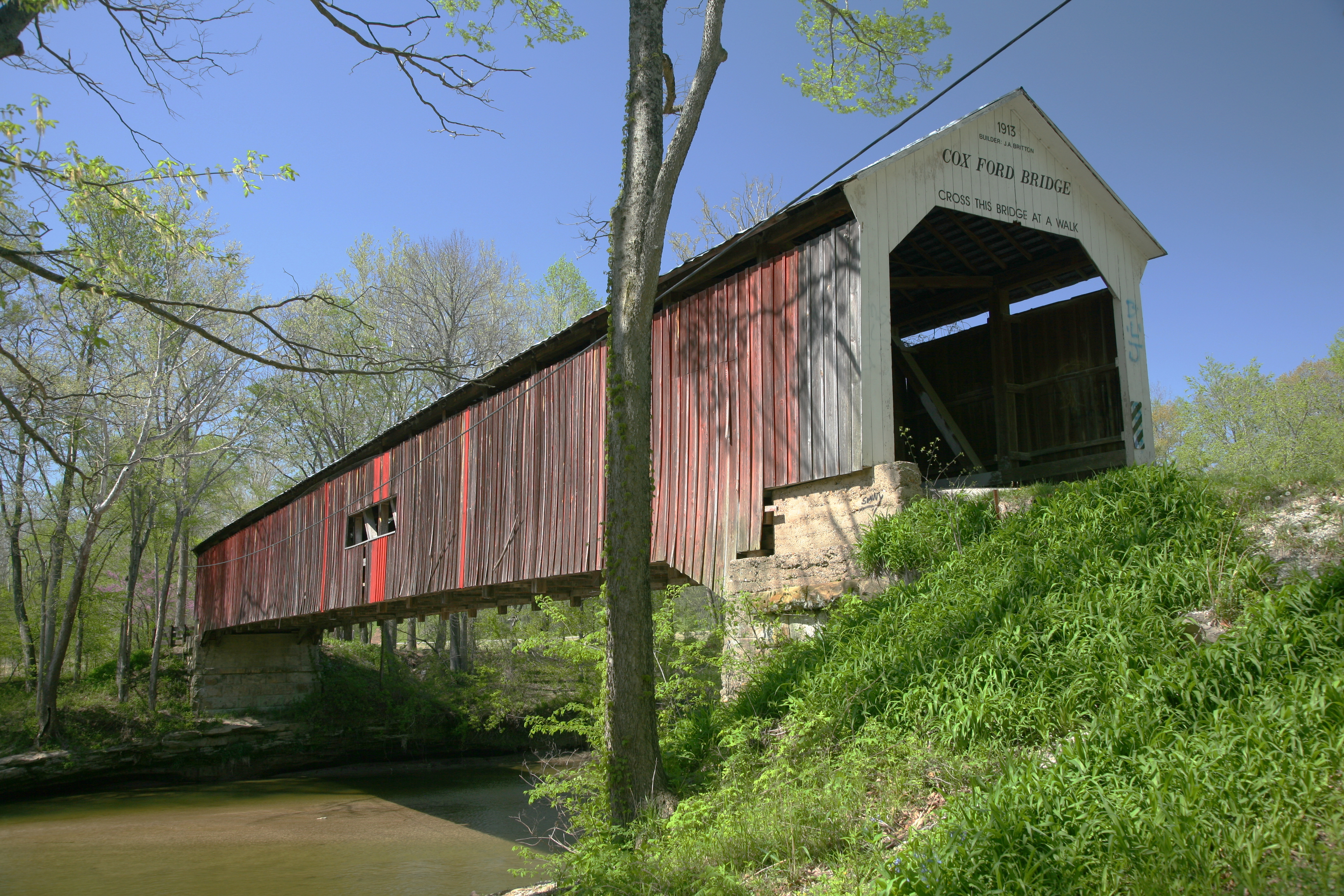
Cox Ford Covered Bridge at Turkey Run

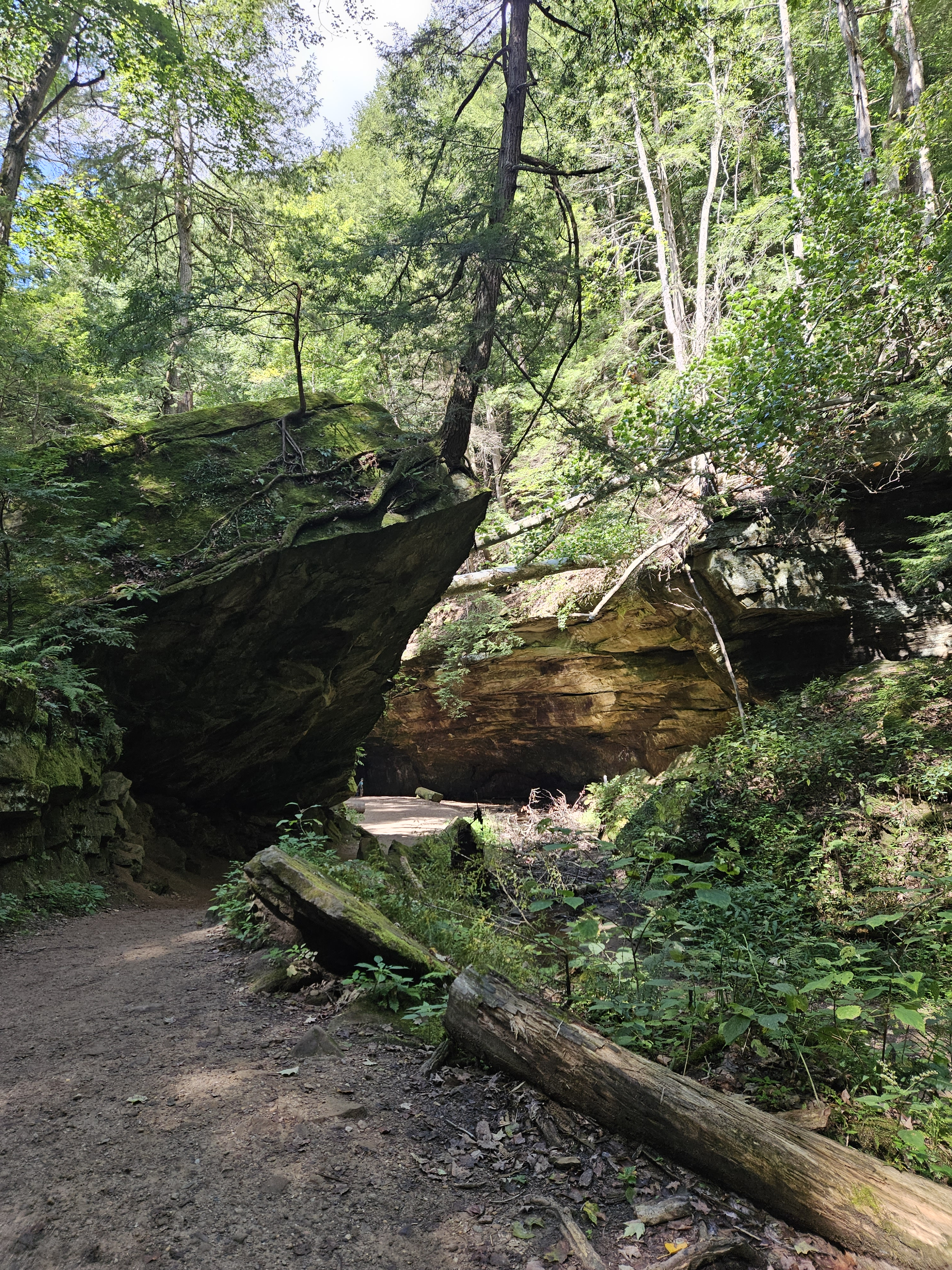
Trail along sandstone formations

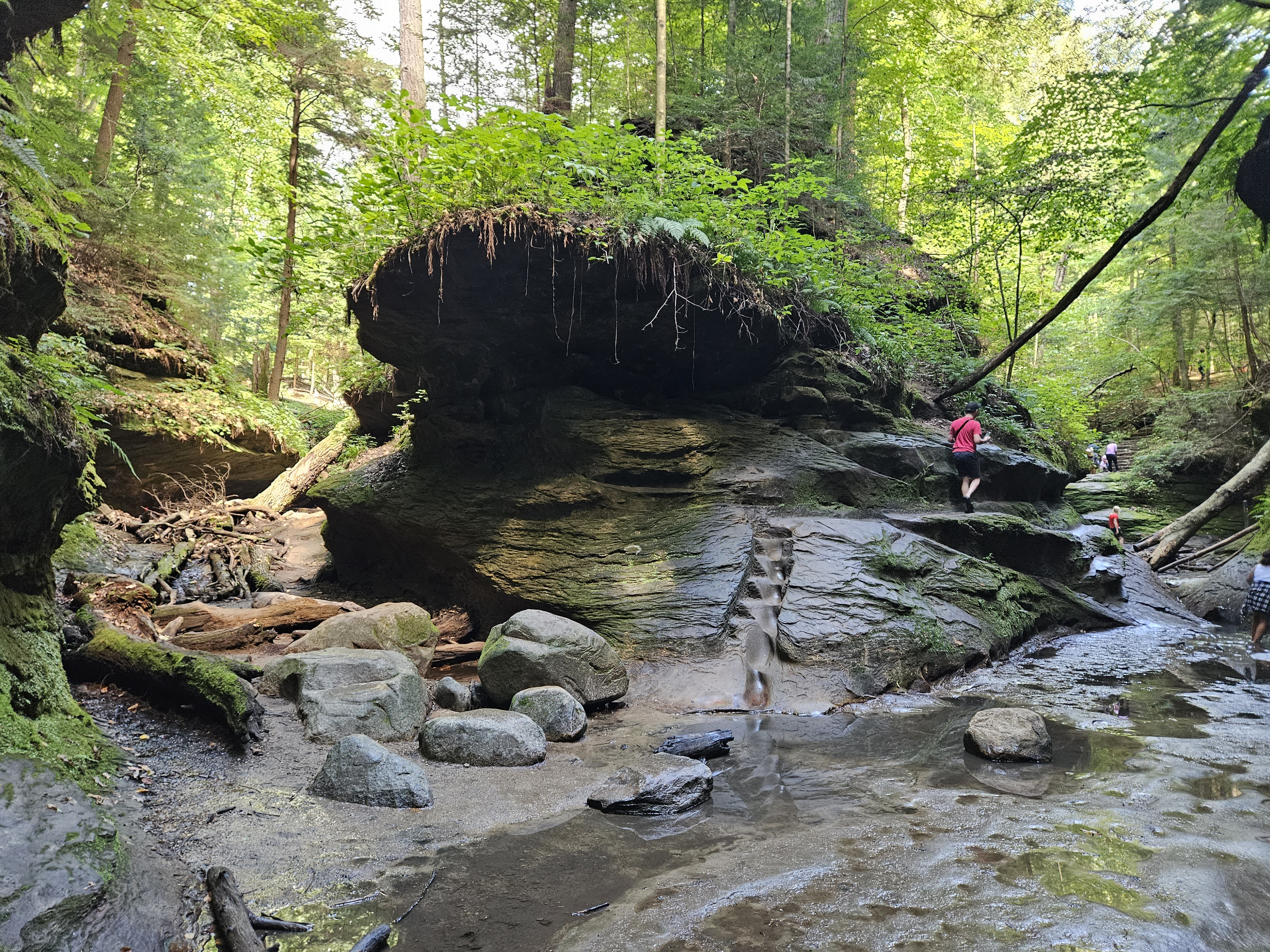
Rocky Hollow Trail

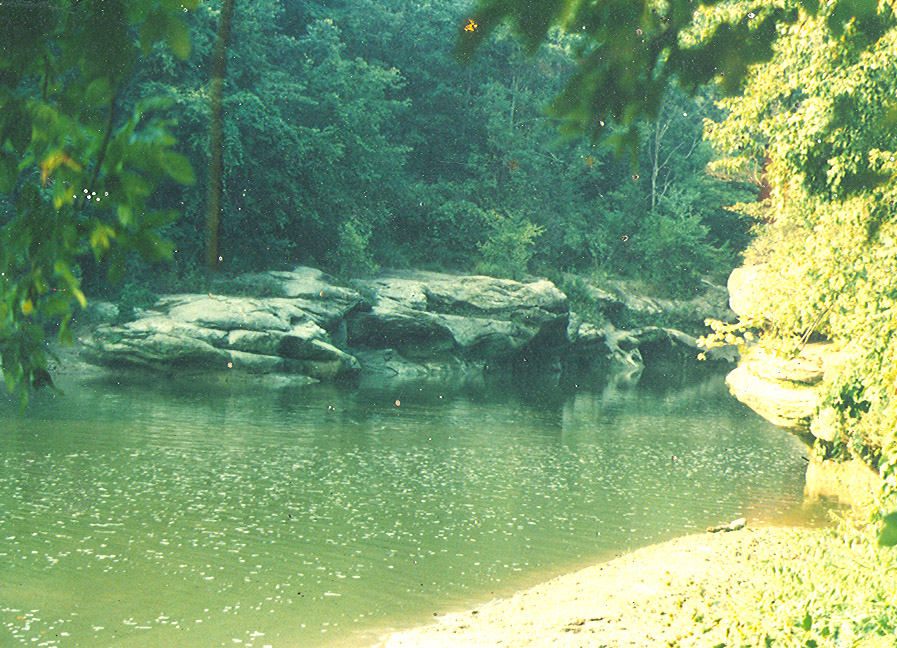
Rock Formations along Turkey Run

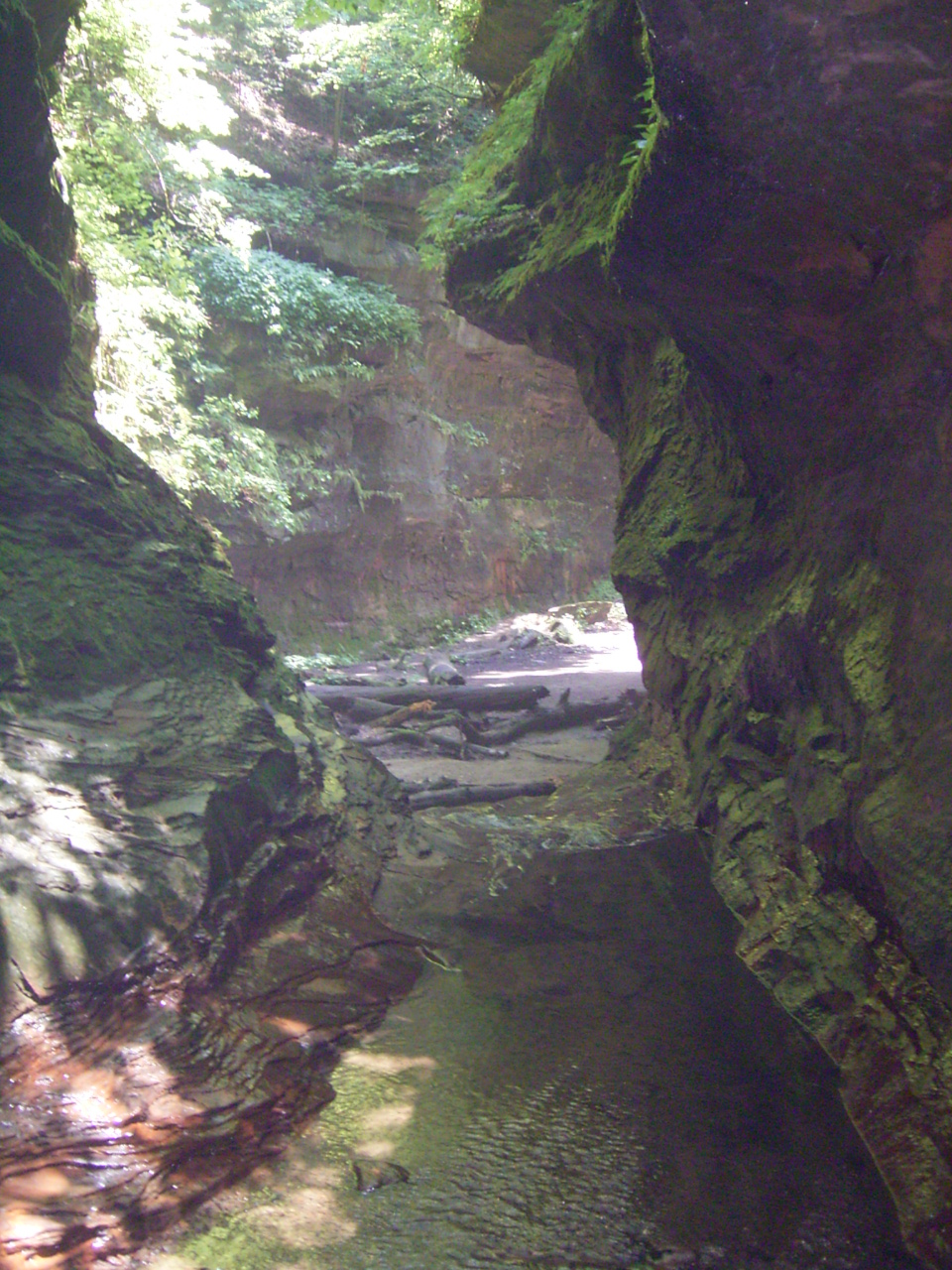
Rocky Hollow, a gorge at Turkey Run

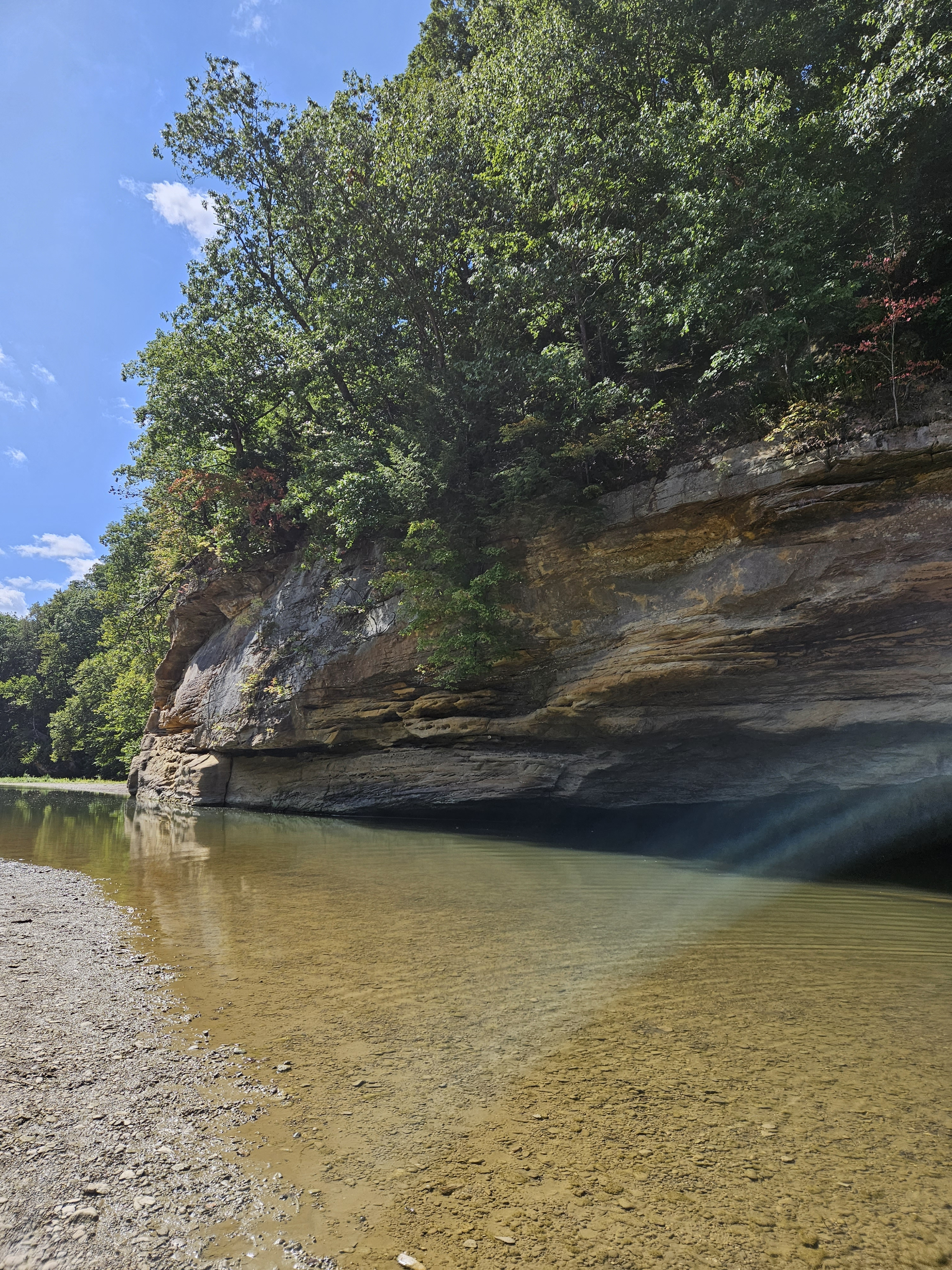
Sugar Creek

== See also ==
- Arch in the Town of Marshall
- Beeson Covered Bridge
- Parke County Covered Bridges
- National Register of Historic Places listings in Parke County, Indiana
- Parke County Covered Bridge Festival
