= Lusk Home and Mill Site =

Historic house in Indiana, United States

- U.S. National Register of Historic Places
- Location within Parke County, Indiana Location within Indiana Location within the United States
- Location: Marshall, Indiana
- Coordinates: 39°53′29.35″N 87°11′8.23″W
- Architect: Britton, J.A.
- Architectural style: Greek Revival, Federal
- NRHP reference No.: 74000017
- Added to NRHP: October 29, 1974

The Lusk Home and Mill Site was the first development in present Turkey Run State Park, Indiana's second oldest state park.

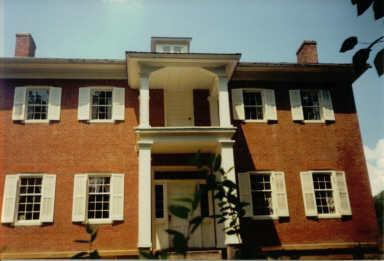
The Lusk Home

Vermonter Salmon Lusk was awarded this land for serving in the Battle of Tippecanoe under William Henry Harrison. The Lusks were largely self-sufficient. Captain Lusk built a log cabin in 1822 and lived there with his spouse and eight children until 1841. Then he and his sons made bricks, carved walnut woodwork, and built the brick house. He dug a coal mine to heat his house. Lusk built a gristmill in 1826 with a foundation of stone-cut stone. A horizontal waterwheel was powered by water diverted by a dam down a race. A settlement grew around Lusk's house and mill, until a Sugar Creek flood on New Year's Day, 1847, washed away every building except Lusk's brick house. Salmon Lusk's wife lived there until 1880, when John Lusk inherited the property. He was inactive managing the site except for preventing woodcutting.

After John Lusk died in 1915, the property was put up for sale. A logging company, Hoosier Veneer, paid US$30,200.00 for the site. Richard Lieber and the State Parks Commission raised $40,000.00 to buy the land from the lumber company after last minute support from the Indianapolis Motor Speedway on November 11, 1916. The Lusk parcel was the first land obtained for Turkey Run State Park.

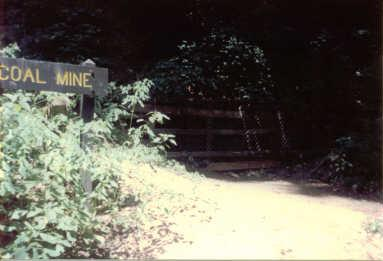
The Lusk Coal Mine

The Lusk Home is open for tours during the summer. There is a fee for parking vehicles within the state park. Visitors pay an entrance fee at the main gate of the park, then hike or drive to the Lusk Home. The coal mine is a bat habitat today.

== See also ==
- Arch in the Town of Marshall
- Richard Lieber Log Cabin, within Turkey Run State Park
- Beeson Covered Bridge
- Parke County Covered Bridges
- List of Registered Historic Places in Indiana
- Parke County Covered Bridge Festival
