= Arch in the Town of Marshall =

- U.S. National Register of Historic Places
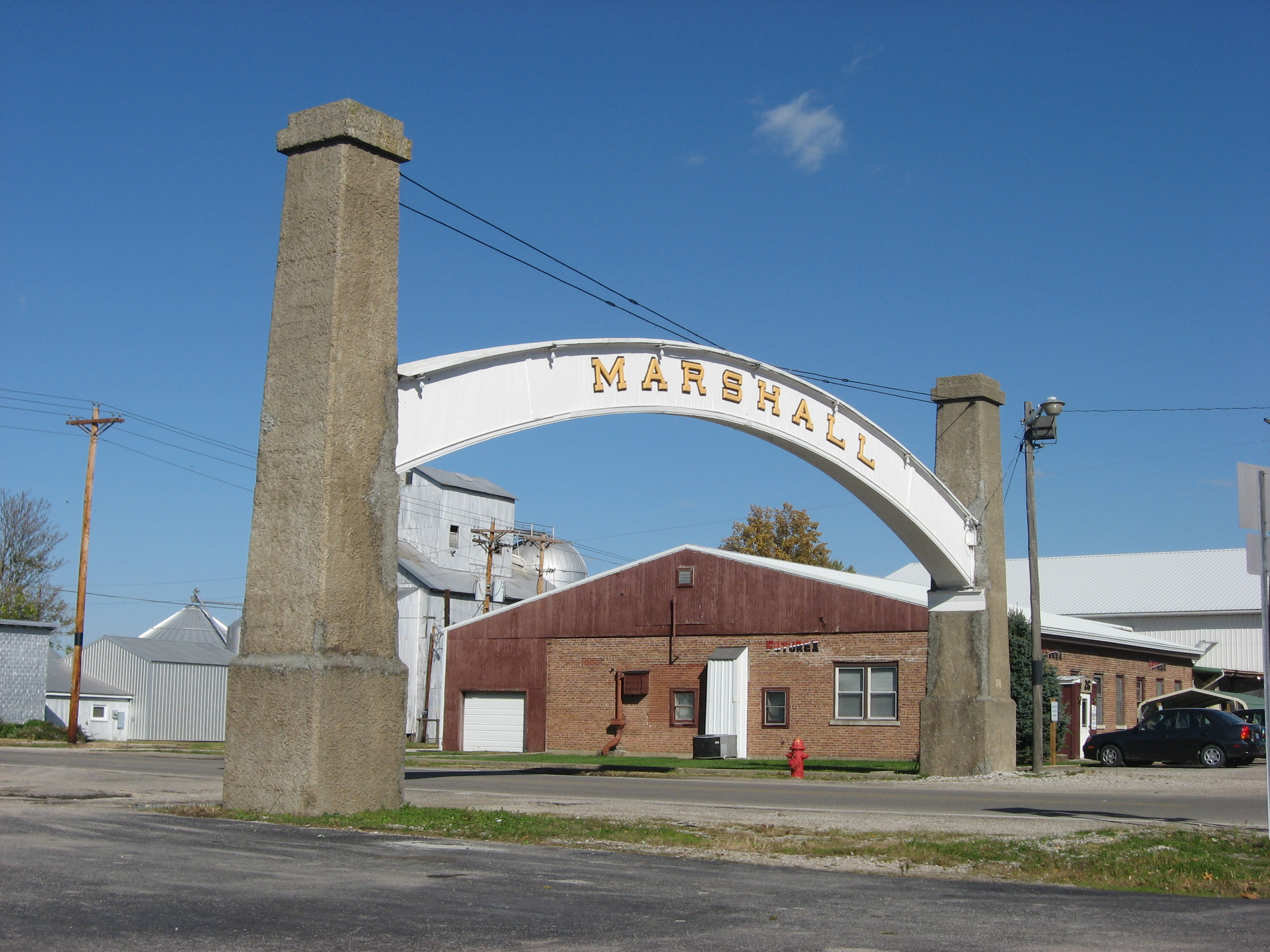
- Southern side of the arch

- Location within Parke County, Indiana Location within Indiana Location within the United States
- Location: Marshall, Indiana
- Coordinates: 39°50′51.37″N 87°11′15.38″W
- Built: 1921
- Architect: Beeson, Carroll
- NRHP reference No.: 85003127
- Added to NRHP: December 26, 1985

The Arch in the Town of Marshall, also known as Marshall Arch, is an arch spanning State Road 236 in downtown Marshall, Indiana, United States. The wooden arch has a span of 51 feet (16 m); it is supported by concrete piers and has a clearance of 17 feet 7 inches (5.36 m) at its highest point. Lettering on each side of the arch spells the town's name. The first work by Indiana architect Carroll O. Beeson, the arch was constructed in 1921. The town's business leaders commissioned the arch as a landmark for the town which was intended to improve the appearance of its business district. The arch was formally dedicated on September 30, 1921; the dedication honored the town's World War I veterans, although the arch was not intended to be a memorial. The structure remains in good condition and has become a popular attraction for visitors to the area.

In addition, The arch was added to the National Register of Historic Places on December 26, 1985.

== See also ==
- Lusk Home and Mill Site, within Turkey Run State Park
- Richard Lieber Log Cabin, within Turkey Run State Park
- Beeson Covered Bridge
- Parke County Covered Bridges
- List of Registered Historic Places in Indiana
- Parke County Covered Bridge Festival
