= Juliet V. Strauss =

American journalist

Juliet Virginia Strauss
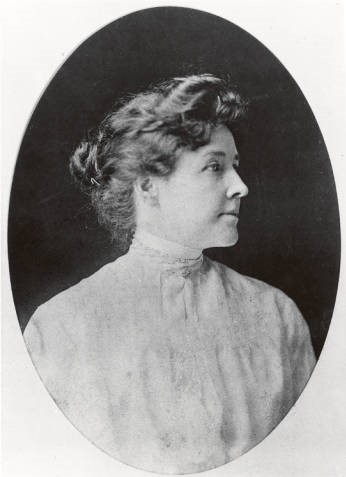
- Portrait of Strauss, c. 1900
- Born: Juliet Virginia Humphries; January 7, 1863; Rockville, Indiana
- Died: May 22, 1918 (aged 55)
- Spouse: Isaac R. Strouse
- Parent(s): William and Susan Humphries

Juliet Virginia Strauss (January 7, 1863 – May 22, 1918) was an American journalist and public speaker from Rockville, Indiana, who was a leader in efforts to generate public and state government support to establish Turkey Run State Park in Parke County, Indiana. It was established in 1916 as Indiana's second state park. She began her journalism career as a regular newspaper columnist at the Rockville Tribune, where she wrote a daily column called "Squibs and Sayings" from 1893 until her death in 1918. From 1903 until 1918, she also wrote a weekly column for the Indianapolis News using the pseudonym of "The Country Contributor." In addition, Strauss authored "The Ideas of a Plain Country Woman," a monthly column for the Ladies' Home Journal from 1905 until 1918. A collection of her articles was published as The Ideas of a Plain Country Woman (1906). Strauss was a founder of the Woman's Press Club of Indiana in 1913, and in 1922, the group dedicated a statue in Strauss's honor at Turkey Run State Park in recognition of her effort to protect its natural beauty.

== Early life and education ==
Juliet Virginia Humphries, the second of four daughters, was born in Rockville, Indiana, on January 7, 1863, to William and Susan (King) Humphries, who were pioneer farmers in rural Parke County, Indiana. Humphries' father gave her nickname of "Gypsy" (later shortened to "Gyp"). After William Humphries' death in 1867, Susan Humphrey raised their children on her own.

Humphries attended local public schools in Rockville and was a lifelong resident of the town. She began writing for the Rockville Tribune newspaper while still in her teens. One of her first articles, "At the Rink," was published in the Tribune in 1880 under the pseudonym of "La Gitani" (the gypsy).

== Marriage and family ==
Juliet Humphries married Isaac R. Strouse on December 22, 1881. (Although her husband spelled his surname as Strouse, she always used the German spelling of Strauss.) In 1882 he became co-owner with John H. Beadle of the Rockville Tribune and the full owner of the newspaper in 1889.

Julie and Isaac Strouse (Strauss) were the parents of two daughters. Their daughter, Marcia F. S. Ott, later became a columnist for the Rockville Republican. The family's home in Rockville was known to Strauss's readers as "Grouch Place."

== Career ==
Strauss's career from 1893 to her death in 1918 included work as a newspaper and magazine columnist, author, and public speaker. Through her writing, she promoted the positive aspects of country life, rural traditions, motherhood, and a woman's role as a homemaker. Strauss also urged women to be themselves and pursue their own interests. Although Strauss staunchly supported women's traditional domestic roles and country life, her work took her into the public sphere.

=== Journalist ===
The demands of Strauss's home and family life limited her time for writing, but she was determined to pursue a career as a journalist. Strauss began as an editorial columnist at the Rockville Tribune. Her regular weekly column, "Squibs and Sayings," first appeared on February 9, 1893. The column's primary audience was women and it included her thoughts on daily life in rural Indiana. In addition to writing, Strauss was an associate editor at the Tribune and helped to manage it.

Strauss's column at the Rockville Tribune contained a mix of stories ranging from commentary on magazine advertisements to women bicyclists and her humorous musings on married life. Although a rival newspaper in Rockville was critical of Strauss and her writing, the locals enjoyed it. She also received encouragement in the early years of her career from other Hoosier writers such as poet James Whitcomb Riley; author and editor John Clark Ridpath; and George S. Cottman, who founded in 1905 the quarterly publication, the Indiana Magazine of History. Cottman praised Strauss's ability to describe early life in Indiana, which was a special interest of hers.

Beginning November 1903 and continuing until her death in 1918, Strauss wrote a regular weekly column for the Indianapolis News as "The Country Contributor." Her first article in the News, "The Short and Simple Annals of the Poor," was published on November 21, 1903. Her final weekly column, "In Defense of Exaggeration," was published on May 25, 1918, two days after her death. Strauss's writing stressed the importance of a supportive home life and the joys of rural and small-town life. She did not encourage women to become active in women's rights movement in the early twentieth century. Instead, Strauss was supportive of women's role in domestic life, but she also encouraged women to retain their individuality.

The Ladies' Home Journal began publishing Strauss's monthly column, "The Ideas of a Plain Country Woman," in November 1905. The column continued until her death in 1918 and gained her national attention as a journalist. Curtis Publishing Company also published a collection of her Journal columns as The Ideas of a Plain Country Woman in 1906. Edward Bok, editor of the Journal, reported in 1903 that the magazine had a circulation of more than a million readers. He later remarked that her articles were "widely read" and "more popular than the writings of any single contributor to the magazine."

=== Conservation activist ===
During the mid-1910s, Strauss became an activist in efforts to protect the natural beauty of the outdoors and joined the nationwide conservation movement. Strauss especially loved the forests near her home in Rockville, Indiana, and was committed to protecting them. In April 1915 she reportedly wrote a letter to Indiana governor Samuel M. Ralston asking him to save 2,382 acres (964 hectares) of land at Turkey Run (at that time called Bloomingdale Glens) in Parke County, Indiana, from timber harvesting. Her letter to Governor Ralston is believed to have prompted his decision to establish a Turkey Run Commission, which was assigned the task of preserving the forest. On April 27, 1915, the governor appointed Strauss to serve as a member of the commission. Strauss also urged Richard Smith, managing editor of the Indianapolis News, to help promote the effort to save Turkey Run. In addition, Indiana conservationist Richard Lieber was interested in protecting the state's forests and developing a state park system. In November 1915 Lieber met with Governor Ralston to discuss the possibility of establishing a state parks system as a permanent memorial to celebrate Indiana's centennial anniversary of its statehood. Ralston agreed to the proposal and appointed Leiber to the Turkey Run Commission in January 1916.

As members of the Turkey Run Commission, Strauss and Lieber lead the efforts to preserve Turkey Run as a state park. Strauss, Lieber, and their colleagues launched a public campaign to increase awareness and persuade members of the public to donate funds to purchase the land at Turkey Run. Strauss wrote articles appearing in the Indianapolis News and Rockville Tribune that described her experiences in rural Parke County and urged others to help preserve its natural landscape. She was also a donor to the park acquisition fund.

The Turkey Run Commission merged with the State Parks Memorial Commission of the Indiana Historical Commission with the hope of acquiring the Turkey Run property, but the group failed in its first attempt to buy land for the new state park system. The Hoosier Veneer Company of Indianapolis, Indiana, acquired Turkey Run at public auction for $30,200 on May 18, 1916, outbidding the state parks commission by $100. In subsequent negotiations with the lumber company, the state government reached an agreement to purchase the land for $40,200 on November 11, 1916. Funds for the purchase largely came from private donations that included a major contribution of $5,065 from the Indianapolis Motor Speedway Association and another $5,000 from auto racing enthusiast Arthur C. Newby. Turkey Run became Indiana's second state park following the earlier acquisition in 1916 of McCormick's Creek Canyon in Owen County, Indiana, to create McCormick's Creek State Park.

== Death and legacy ==
Strauss died on May 22, 1918. Her most notable legacy was the successful effort to save Turkey Run in Parke County, Indiana, and to establish Turkey Run State Park in 1916 as Indiana's second state park. In addition to her work as a conservation activist on behalf of Turkey Run, an Indianapolis News article in 1918, called her "one of the best known of Indiana writers." Strauss was popular with her readers in Indiana, who considered her "as friend and counselor" according to the News at the time of her death. She was also nationally known for her articles in the Ladies' Home Journal. Her "down-to-earth" writing style covered of topics of interest to women and "celebrated the joys of being a homemaker." Strauss was also a founding member in 1913 of the Woman's Press Club of Indiana.

== Honors and awards ==
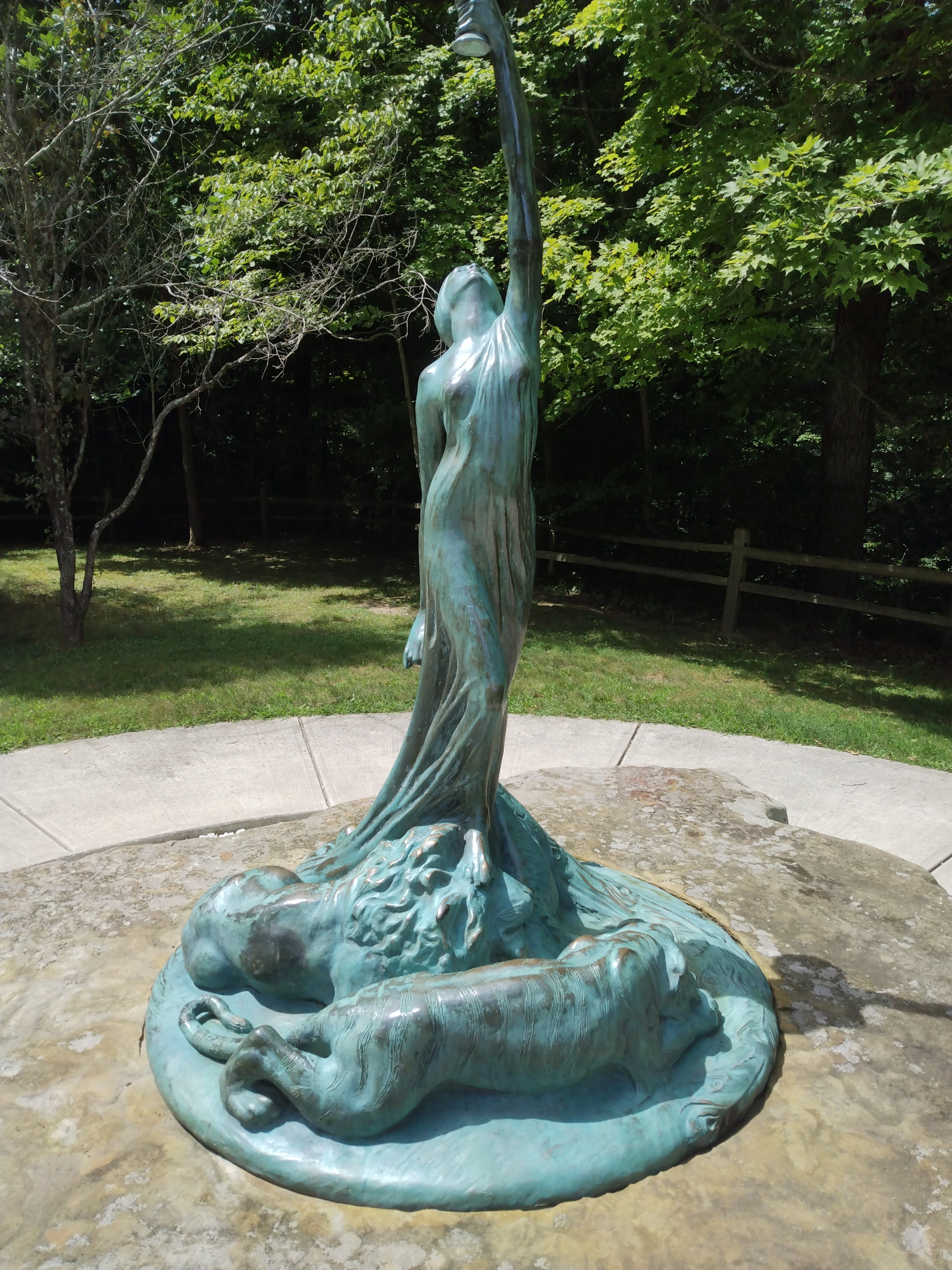
Subjugation memorial statue in Turkey Run, created by Myra R. Richards

- In July 1922, the Woman's Press Club of Indiana dedicated a memorial statue and fountain in Strauss's honor at Turkey Run State Park. Created by Myra R. Richards, the sculpture was called Subjugation to reflect the "spirit of Strauss's writing–the subjugation of the material to the spiritual" according to the Press Club. It features a woman rising above various animals that represent human vices.
- Strass was named to the Indiana Journalism Hall of Fame in 2001.
- In 2012 the Indiana Historical Bureau erected a state historical marker at her former home at 514 N. College Street in Rockville, Indiana, to honor Strauss for her work as a journalist and efforts to preserve Turkey Run and make it a state park.

== Selected published works ==
- The Ideas of a Plain County Woman (1906).

== Sources ==
- Banta, R. E., compiler (1949). Indiana Authors and Their Books, 1816–1916. Crawfordsville, Indiana: Wabash College. p. 308. OCLC 1044959.
- Boomhower, Ray E. (Spring 1995). "The Country Contributor: Rockville's Juliet V. Strauss". Traces of Indiana and Midwestern History. 7 (2). Indianapolis: Indiana Historical Society: 38–46.
- "Hoosier women pioneers in media". Hoosier History Live!. March 2, 2013.
- Hoy, Suellen M. (September 1975). "Governor Samuel M. Ralston and Indiana's Centennial Celebration". Indiana Magazine of History. 71 (3). Bloomington: Indiana University: 224–66.
- Indiana Magazine of History staff (February 27, 2012). "A Centenary Celebration 'In Keeping With The Dignity Of The State'". Moment of Indiana History. Indiana Public Media.
- "Juliet Strauss" (PDF). Writing Her Story. Indiana Commission for Women.
- "Juliet V. Strauss". The Historical Marker Database.
- "Juliet V. Strauss". Indiana Historical Bureau.
- "Juliet V. Strauss". Indiana Journalism Hall of Fame. Archived from the original on August 6, 2019.
- Ksander, Yael (January 30, 2006). "Julie Strauss". Moment of Indiana History. Indiana Public Media.
- Silver, David M. (March 1971). "Richard Lieber and Indiana's Forest Heritage". Indiana Magazine of History. 67 (4). Bloomington: Indiana University: 45–55.
