= SIG Sauer P227 =

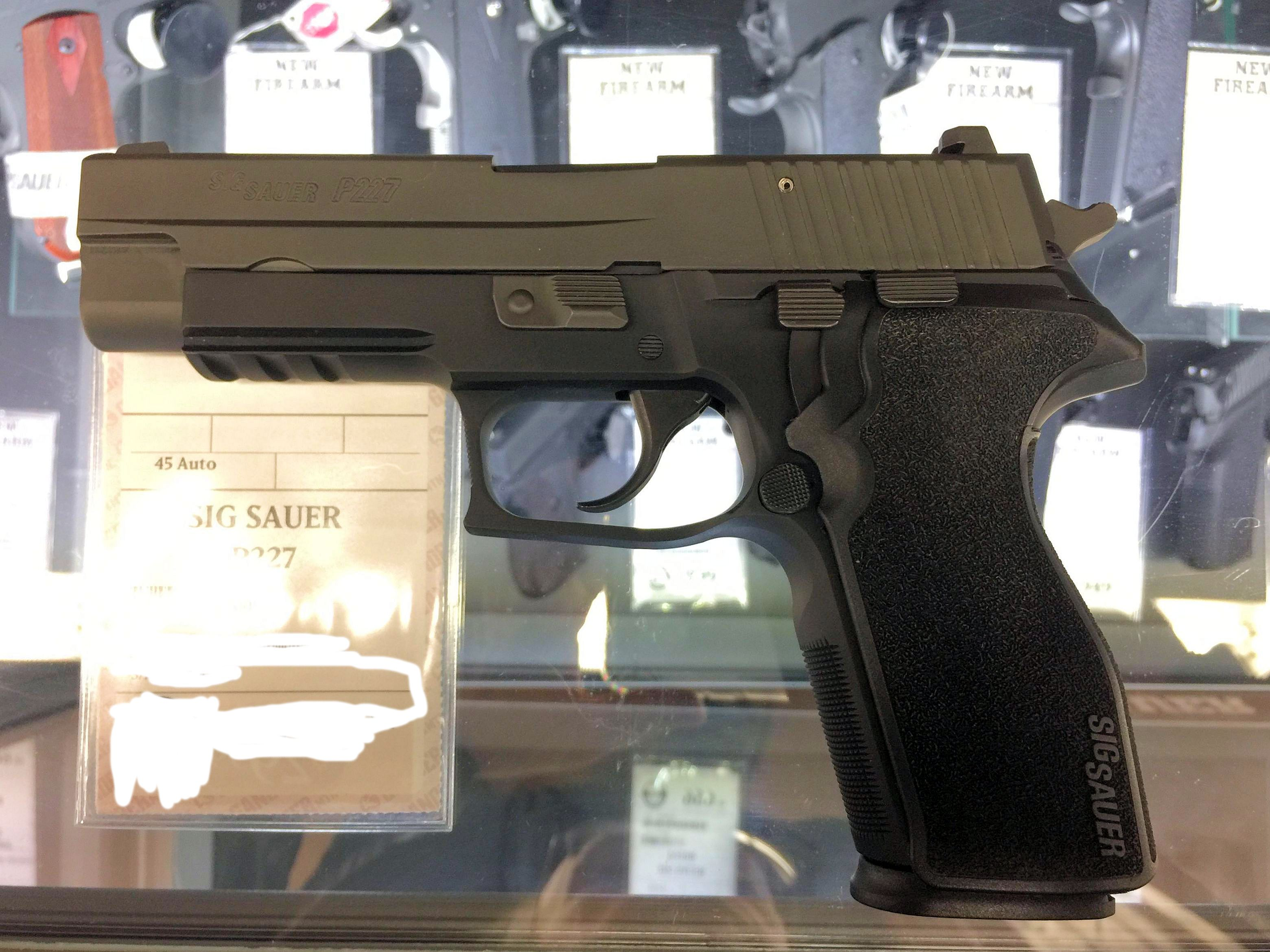
- SIG Sauer P227 Left Side
- Type: Semi-automatic pistol
- Place of origin: United States

Production history
- Designed: 2013
- Manufacturer: SIG Sauer, Exeter, NH
- Produced: 2013 – 2019

Specifications
- Mass: 907 g (2.000 lb)
- Length: 196 mm (7.7 in)
- Barrel length: 112 mm (4.4 in)
- Width: 38 mm (1.5 in)
- Height: 140 mm (5.5 in)
- Cartridge: .45 ACP
- Action: SIG Sauer system, locked breech, short recoil
- Muzzle velocity: 830 feet per second (250 m/s)
- Feed system: box magazine: 10 rounds (standard and all other models); 14 rounds (TACOPS and Tactical models)

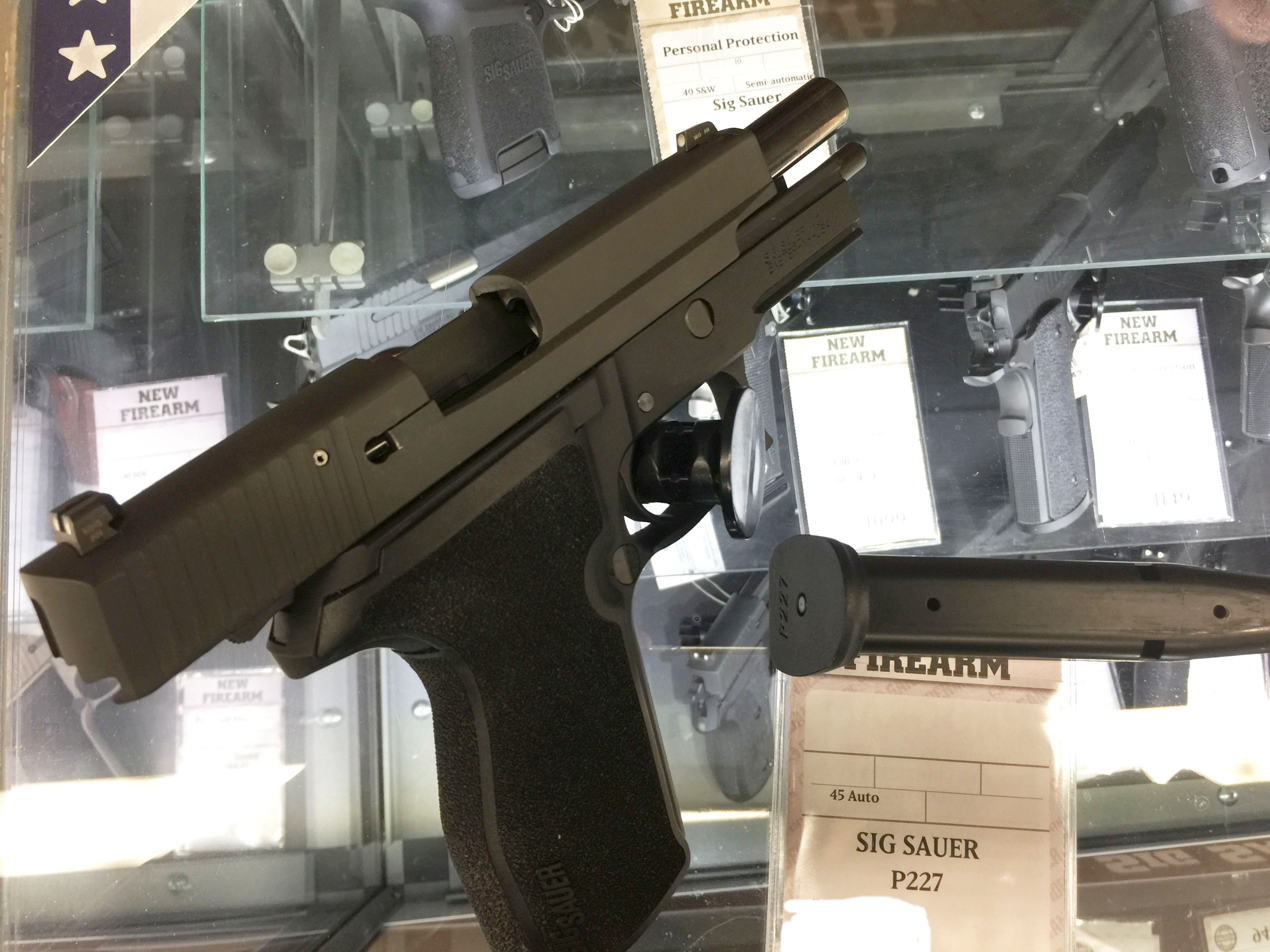
SIG Sauer P227 Right Side, locked open with magazine

The SIG Sauer P227 is an American-designed and produced semi-automatic pistol which was introduced in 2013 and discontinued in 2019. The P227 introduced a double-stack .45 ACP caliber handgun into the SIG Sauer lineup. It was introduced along with the P224.

== Design ==
The P227 is similar in many ways to the P220 in .45 ACP that SIG Sauer introduced in 1975. It uses the same SIG Sauer designed short recoil locking system with their Single/Double Action trigger. The P220 is a full sized large pistol. The P227 uses a double row magazine for increased ammunition capacity and is very slightly larger to the point that it is not very noticeable. The action automatically locks open after the firing of the last round in the magazine. The hammer, can be safely lowered by the decocking lever. Takedown is accomplished by removing the magazine, locking the slide open, and then turning down the takedown lever. The slide, barrel, and recoil spring will then slide forward off of the frame.

The P227 also features the new Enhanced Ergonomics 'E2' wraparound grip, rather than the two-piece grips of the P220. The P227 has a magazine capacity of ten rounds (fourteen on the TACOPS model, unlike the eight-round capacity of the P220. The P227 is a double-action/single-action-operated handgun, meaning that the first trigger pull is a ten-lb double-action pull, but all the follow-up shots are a 4.4-lb single-action pull. The full size model is 7.7 inches in length (with a 4.4 inch barrel) and 5.5 inches in height with 1.5 inches in width. It weighs 32 ounces (907 g) with the magazine, features an accessory rail and three-dot contrast sights or SIGLITE night sights. The frame is constructed from anodized aluminum alloy with a Nitron finish and a milled stainless steel slide.

== Model descriptions ==
As of February 2017, the P227 is offered in eight models from the SIG Sauer Web Site:

- The P227 Nitron Full Size has a 4.4-inch (112 mm) barrel and comes with polymer grips and a standard 10-round magazine magazines
- The P227 Nitron Carry has a 3.9-inch (99 mm) barrel, comes with two 10-round magazines and is smoothed off for easier concealed carry
- The P227 SAS Gen 2 Carry has a short reset trigger (SRT) and a 3.9-inch (99 mm) barrel, comes with two 10-round magazines and does not have an accessory rail
- The P227 TACOPS Full Size has a 4.4-inch (112 mm) barrel and comes with a beavertail frame, G10 grip panels, TRUGLO front and SIGLITE rear sights, front cocking serrations, front strap checkering, an extended magazine well and four 14-round magazines
- The P227 Tactical Full Size has a short reset trigger (SRT), a 5.1-inch (130 mm) threaded barrel to accept a suppressor, front strap checkering, SIGLITE sights, and came with one 10-round and one 14-round magazine(a change in model numbers signaled the exclusion of the 14-round magazine due to feeding issues; these new models instead shipped with two 10-round magazines)
- The P227 Flat Dark Earth, featuring a flat dark earth coated frame and slide, has a 4.4-inch (112 mm) barrel and it comes with a standard 10-round magazine
- The P227 Equinox has a two-tone polished slide with nickel controls, a 4.4-inch (112 mm) barrel, and it comes with a standard 10-round magazine
- The P227 Enhanced Elite has a 4.4-inch (112 mm) barrel, beavertail frame, front slide cocking serrations, a short reset trigger (SRT), a one-piece ergonomic grip, front strap checkering, and a 10-round magazine

== Adoption ==
In 2013, the Indiana State Police adopted the SIG Sauer P227 Full Size Nitron as its department-issued sidearm. The contract calls for over 5000 P227 deliveries by the end of 2014. In February of 2026, it was announced the Indiana State Police would transition from the P227 to the 9mm P320 Platform due to Sig having discontinued the P227.

In 2014, after extensive .45 ACP weapon testing involving several manufacturers, the Pennsylvania State Police selected the P227 as its department-issued sidearm. The Pennsylvania State Police replaced the P227 with the Walther PDP in 2024, due to Sig Sauer ceasing production of P227 Parts 5 years prior.
