= Indiana State Police =

Statewide law enforcement agency for the U.S. state of Indiana

Coordinates: 39°46′7.83″N 86°9′53.72″W

- Indiana State Police patch
- Abbreviation: ISP
- Motto: Integrity, Service, Professionalism

Agency overview
- Formed: February 28, 1933; 93 years ago
- Preceding agency: Indiana Motor Vehicle Police (1921–1933)
- Employees: 1,744 (2014)

Jurisdictional structure
- Operations jurisdiction: Indiana, USA
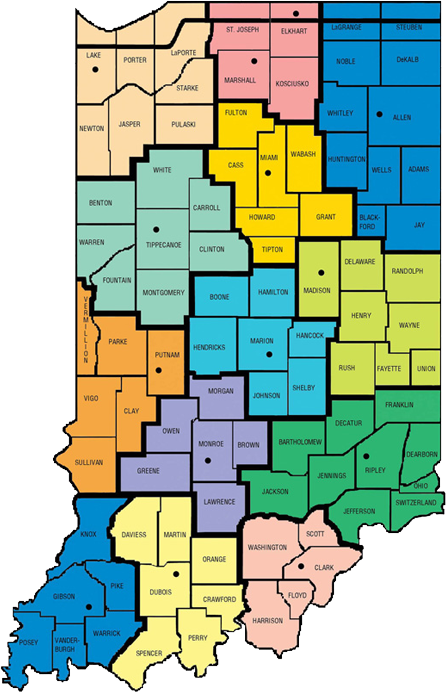
- ISP Districts
- Area: 36,418 sq mi (94,321 km^{2})
- Population: 6,619,680 (2015 est.)
- Legal jurisdiction: (Indiana) Statewide
- Governing body: Governor of Indiana
- General nature: Civilian police

Operational structure
- Overseen by: Indiana State Police Board
- Headquarters: 100 North Senate Avenue; Indianapolis, Indiana
- Troopers: ▼1,134 of 1,280 (2025)
- Civilians: 465 (2014)
- Agency executives: Anthony M. Scott, Superintendent; Christopher L. Hill, Assistant Superintendent

Facilities
- Districts: 14: 13 - Lowell; 14 - Lafayette; 16 - Peru; 21 - Toll Road; 22 - Fort Wayne; 24 - Bremen; 33 - Bloomington; 34 - Jasper; 35 - Evansville; 42 - Versailles; 45 - Sellersburg; 51 - Pendleton; 52 - Indianapolis; 53 - Putnamville

Website
- http://www.in.gov/isp/

The Indiana State Police is the statewide law enforcement agency for the U.S. state of Indiana. Indiana was the 12th state to offer protection to its citizens with a state police force.

Its headquarters are in the Indiana Government Center North in Indianapolis.

== History ==
Demographics comparison
	ISP	Indiana
Male	95%	49.1%
Female	5%	50.9%
White	91%	87.5%
African-American or Black	7%	8.4%
Hispanic	1%	3.5%
Asian	0%	1.0%

On March 11, 1921, "the secretary of state with approval of the governor is hereby given power to appoint all necessary deputies in addition to the present officers of the law" to enforce motor vehicle laws. The secretary of state appointed a 16-man Indiana Motor Vehicle Police, becoming the first law enforcement agency in the state to have statewide jurisdiction to enforce traffic laws, although they had only "limited" authority and were only authorized to enforce the "rules of the road" and motor vehicle laws. On March 10, 1927, the Indiana legislature created a Bureau of Criminal Identification and Investigation, also under the secretary of state, for the purpose of installing and maintaining "local identification systems for the identification and prosecution of criminals and the investigation of crimes." In 1933, the Indiana State Police was formed largely consisting of basically untrained, ill-equipped traffic officers left over from the Motor Vehicle Police. The first formal "academy" began July 15, 1935, and consisted of between 80 and 100 candidates. It was not until 1976 that the academy graduated its first female troopers.

== Indiana State Police Board ==
The Indiana State Police Board administers, manages, and controls the operation of the agency including the setting of salaries and compensation, with the approval of the governor and may review disciplinary action taken against a state police employee by the superintendent. The ISP board consists of six civilian members who are appointed by the governor and must be a permanent resident of one of six geographical regions of the state from which they are appointed. Members serve staggered, four-year terms and no more than three may belong to the same political party.

== Organization ==
The Indiana State Police is currently led by Superintendent Anthony M. Scott, whose position is appointed by the governor. His command staff includes a Chief of Staff who holds the rank of Colonel and six Assistant Chiefs of Staff, two of which hold the rank of Lieutenant Colonel, three holding the rank of Major, and one civilian employee. The Assistant Chiefs of Staff manage the following areas of the agency:

- Intelligence and Investigations covers the investigative needs of the agency, and covers specialties such as Cybercrimes or Internet Crimes Against Children, and the State Police Laboratory Division, which primarily consists of criminal forensics for ongoing investigations.
- Operations consists of primarily field operations and patrol services, but also includes the oversight of the Recruit Academy and the Capitol Police Section.
- Logistics consists of the oversight of logistical needs of the agency to ensure it is prepared for operations. The elements overseen by the Assistant Chief of Staff for Logistics includes the Quartermaster Unit, Fleet Management, and Facilities Management.
- Communications and Information Systems consists of the oversight of the six Regional Dispatch Centers (Lowell, Fort Wayne, Bloomington, Versailles, Indianapolis, and the Toll Road) utilized by the State Police, the Firearms Licensing Unit, Information Technology Section, and the Criminal Justice Information Services Section.
- Human Resources and Administration focuses on the personnel management and administrative needs of the agency, and primarily includes the Employment Services Section, where the selection processes and recruiting is handled, the Human Resources Section, primarily concerned with policy and personnel allocation, and the Benefits Section.
- Fiscal strictly deals with the financial needs of the department, and includes matters such as payroll, overtime and travel assignments/management, contract administration, the purchasing unit, accounts payable, and accounts receivable.

== List of ISP superintendents ==
- Robert T. Humes (1921–1930)†
- Grover C. Garrott (1930–1933)†
- Albert G. Feeney (1933–1935)
- Donald F. Stiver (1935–1944)
- Austin R. Killian (1945–1947)
- Robert R. Rossow (1947–1949)
- Arthur M. Thurston (1949–1952)
- Robert A. O'Neal (1952–1953)
- Frank A. Jessup (1953–1957)
- Harold S. Zeis (1957–1961)
- John J. Barton (1961–1963)
- George A. Everett (1963–1965)
- Robert A. O'Neal (1965–1968)
- Arthur R. Raney, Jr. (1968–1969)
- Robert K. Konkle (1969–1973)
- Robert L. DeBard (1973–1977)
- John T. Shettle (1977–1987)
- Larry D. Furnas (1987–1989)
- Lloyd R. Jennings (1989–1997)
- Melvin J. Carraway (1997–2005)
- Paul E. Whitesell, Ph.D. (2005–2012)
- Douglas G. Carter (2013–2025)
- Anthony M. Scott (2025– )

† Chief of the Indiana Motor Vehicle Police

== Rank structure ==
The agency's rank structure is as follows (from highest to lowest):

Rank	Insignia	Notes
Superintendent		The Superintendent of the State Police is appointed by the Governor as the executive head of the agency, tasked with the daily oversight of the agency and its operations, ensuring that the agency is prepared and capable of responding as needed to perform their daily duties, or other duties as needed and assigned.
Colonel		Serves as the Chief of Staff for the Superintendent, assisting them in overseeing the daily operations and preparation needs for the agency. The Colonel may fill in as an Interim Superintendent during either the vacancy or absence of the Superintendent.
Lieutenant Colonel		Lieutenant Colonels serve as Assistant Chiefs of Staff at the State Police Headquarters in Indianapolis, overseeing the units and divisions assigned under them for management purposes.
Major		Majors may serve as an Assistant Chief of Staff at the State Police Headquarters in Indianapolis, overseeing the units or other elements under their command. Majors may also be assigned to oversee the operations of a command, which is a major division, such as the Commercial Vehicle Enforcement Division, or be appointed as either North or South Zone Commander, overseeing patrol and criminal investigations operations throughout the districts in their zone.
Captain		Captains may serve as senior leadership within their command under the supervision of a Major, or in certain circumstances, may themselves be appointed to oversee a command mentioned above. There are also Captains who serve as Area Commanders, overseeing patrol operations at districts within an assigned area of either the North or South Zone. Similarly, there is also a Captain appointed as an Area Investigations Commander, overseeing the Criminal Investigations Division within their assigned area.
Lieutenant		Lieutenants may be assigned to serve as the District Commander at any of the 14 State Police districts across the state, or may serve as a section or unit commander under the supervision of a Captain and/or Major.
First Sergeant		First Sergeants may be assigned to serve as the Assistant District Commander at any of the 14 State Police districts across the state, assisting their Lieutenant in the oversight of operations at their district. They may also be assigned into sections or units, assisting their Lieutenant in that section or unit in overseeing the day-to-day operations of the unit. At each District, there is also a First Sergeant assigned as the District Investigations Coordinator, overseeing the Criminal Investigations Division operations in that district.
Sergeant		Sergeants may be seen serving as Squad Leaders for personnel assigned in patrol at a State Police district, as well as serving as front line supervisors in either patrol, criminal investigations, or other duties throughout the various sections and units across the state. Each district, with the exception of the Toll Road, has a Public Information Officer for media relations at the district. The District PIO holds the rank of Sergeant.
Corporal		Corporals are front line supervisors for Troopers on the road, typically also serving as mentors for the Troopers. They may be assigned to other units and sections, but are typically found patrolling on the roads within their district and assisting the Troopers in that district.
Trooper	No Insignia	Troopers are the front line personnel, who start their careers in patrol, but may move throughout the agency into different specialties and assignments. This rank includes the designations of Senior Trooper at 10 years of service and Master Trooper at 15 years of service.
Probationary Trooper	No Insignia	After graduating the State Police Recruit Academy, graduates are appointed as Probationary Troopers, and will serve in this capacity for one calendar year, through the completion of field training and the first several months of solo patrol after they're issued their first police vehicle.
Recruit	No insignia	Recruits are those currently undergoing training in the State Police Recruit Academy.

Troopers with 10 and 15 years of service are referred to as a Senior Trooper and a Master Trooper respectively, resulting in salary increases, but are not considered ranks.

As of July 2023, the starting pay for a Trooper is $70,000 per year.

== Equipment ==
=== Aircraft ===
In 1948, the Indiana State Police acquired a Navion airplane. Aircraft continued to be utilized throughout the 1950s and the Aviation Section continued to grow having helicopters introduced into the air fleet. Today, the Indiana State Police have two fixed-wing aircraft, three helicopters and six pilots used for law enforcement throughout the state which are maintained by the Aviation Section, a part of the Special Operations Section. The Indiana State Police also conduct joint operations with the Indiana National Guard to combat against illegal outdoor cannabis cultivation sites.

=== Service weapons ===
In 2006, around 50 Glock .40 S&W handguns issued to state troopers were identified as defective, impairing function. The handguns were replaced with the Glock 17 9mm, which functioned perfectly.

The Indiana State Police chose the SIGM400 rifle for its SWAT in 2012, and chose the SIG-Sauer P227 as its duty pistol, alongside the SIG-Sauer P365 as a backup pistol in 2019.

In 2026, The Indiana State Police transitioned to the SIG-Sauer P320 as its duty pistol.

Troopers are no longer issued the Remington 870 12 gauge Police Magnum shotgun. Troopers are issued the Sig M-400 rifle as their patrol rifle as a result of increasing gun violence across the country.

=== Vehicles ===
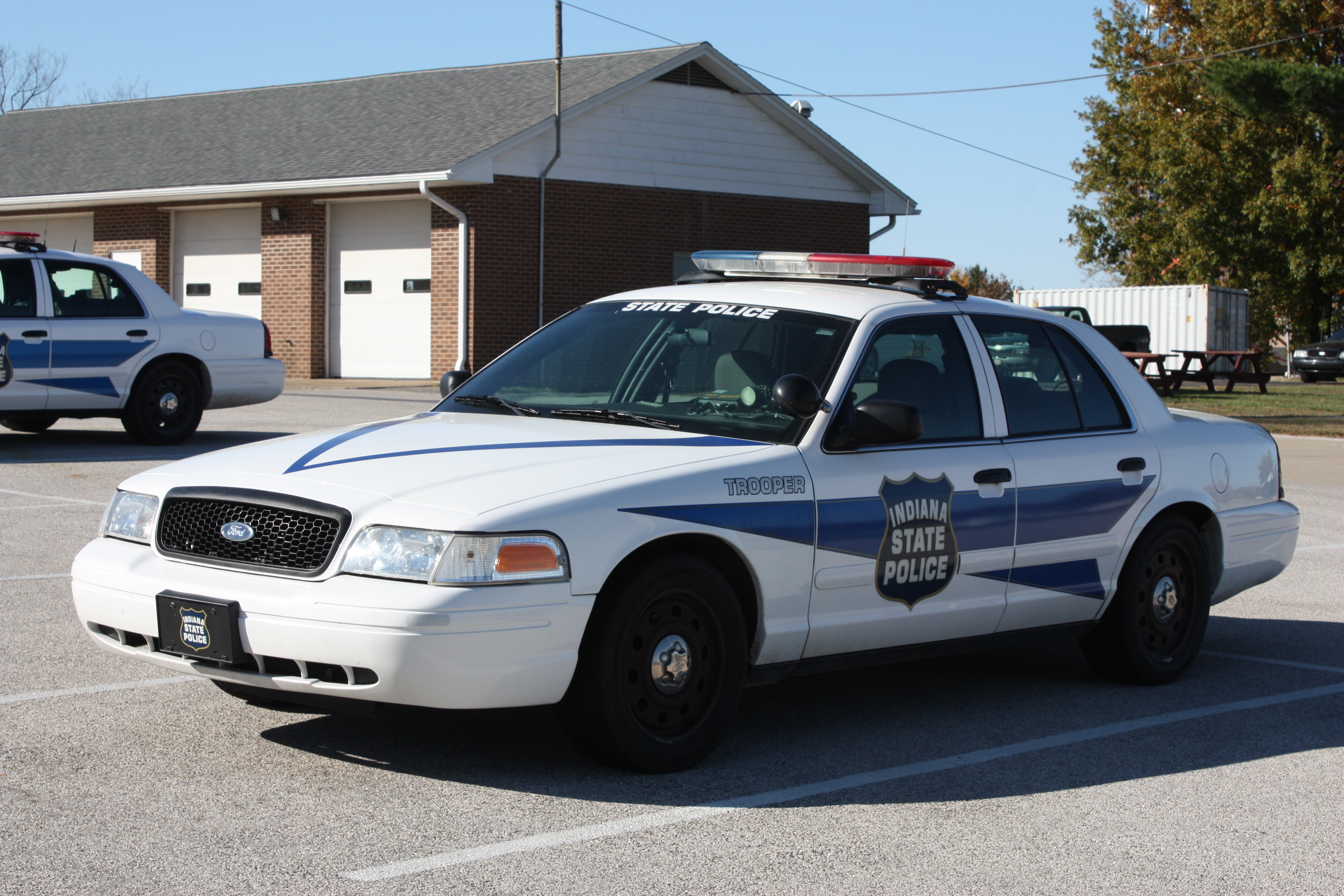
Indiana State Police cruiser (Discontinued)

After the discontinuation of the Ford Crown Victoria following the 2011 model year, the State Police transitioned to primarily using Dodge Chargers with the 8-cylinder engines. Some personnel were still issued larger vehicles such as the Dodge RAM 1500 or Chevrolet Tahoe for personnel working in areas such as Commercial Vehicle Enforcement or Criminal Investigations, who as a result of the nature of their duties, needed heavier duty vehicles with the storage space. Following the decision for the Dodge Charger to become an all-electric vehicle starting in the 2024 model year, the State Police again began to transition its vehicle of choice, and began issuing out the Dodge Durango as its primary patrol vehicle for personnel in patrol, and continued to use the 8-cylinder engine as it is the engine best suited for their performance needs on the interstate highways throughout the state.

As of June, the 2024 Dodge Durangos have been placed on hold amidst widespread mechanical issues affecting approximately 20% of the 500 vehicles purchased.

== Indiana State Police districts ==
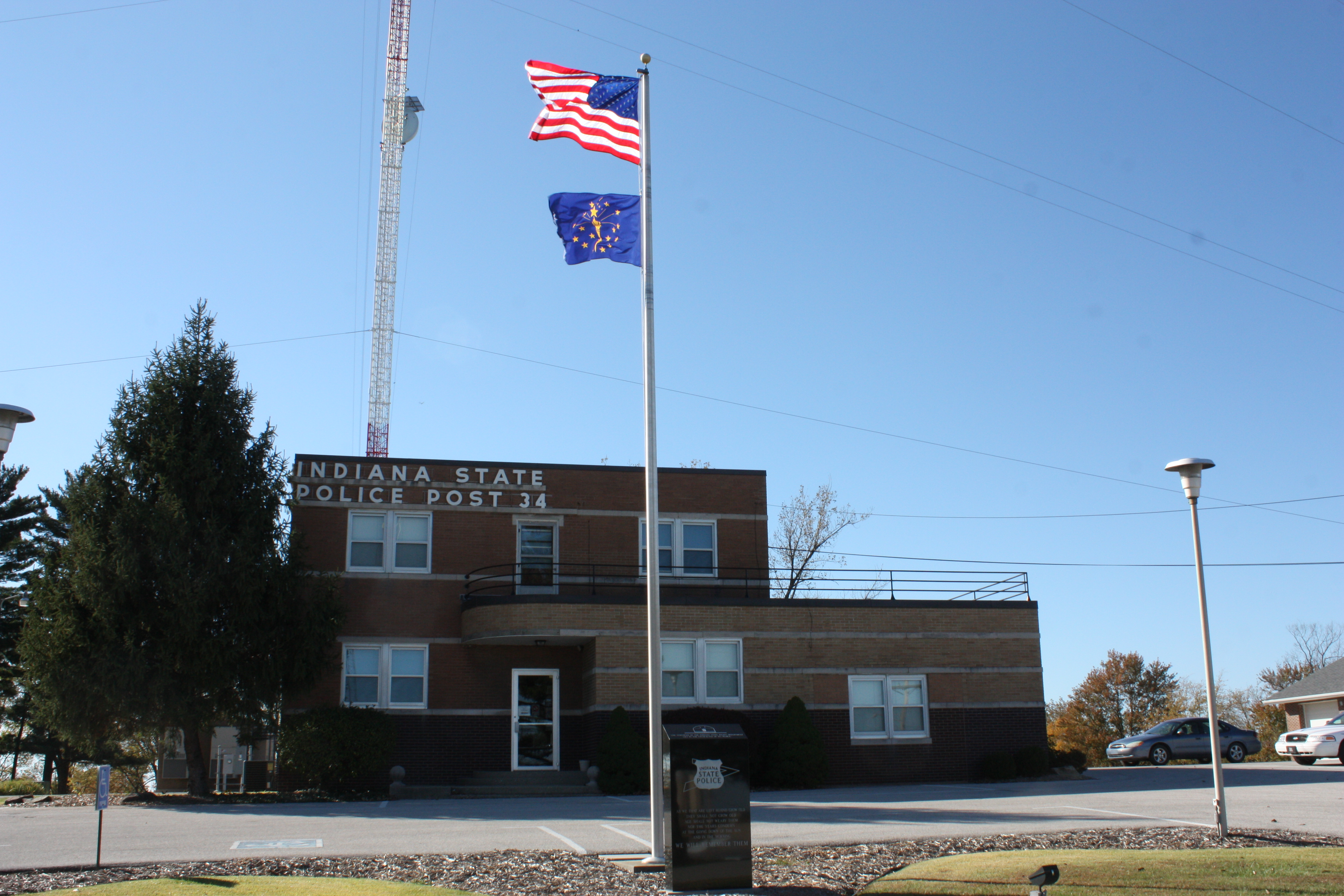
Indiana State Police Post 34 in Jasper

Area	District	Post	Counties Covered
I	13	Lowell	Jasper, Lake, LaPorte, Newton, Porter, Pulaski and Starke
I	14	Lafayette	Benton, Carroll, Clinton, Fountain, Montgomery, Tippecanoe, Warren and White
I	16	Peru	Cass, Fulton, Grant, Howard, Miami, Tipton and Wabash
II	21	Toll Road	Indiana Toll Road
II	22	Fort Wayne	Adams, Allen, Blackford, DeKalb, Huntington, Jay, LaGrange, Noble, Steuben, Wells and Whitley
II	24	Bremen	Elkhart, Kosciusko, Marshall and St. Joseph
III	33	Bloomington	Brown, Greene, Lawrence, Monroe, Morgan and Owen
III	34	Jasper	Crawford, Daviess, Dubois, Martin, Orange, Perry and Spencer
III	35	Evansville	Gibson, Knox, Pike, Posey, Vanderburgh and Warrick
IV	42	Versailles	Bartholomew, Dearborn, Decatur, Franklin, Jackson, Jefferson, Jennings, Ohio, Ripley and Switzerland
IV	45	Sellersburg	Clark, Floyd, Harrison, Scott and Washington
V	51	Pendleton	Delaware, Fayette, Henry, Madison, Randolph, Rush, Union and Wayne
V	52	Indianapolis	Boone, Hamilton, Hancock, Hendricks, Johnson, Marion and Shelby
V	53	Putnamville	Clay, Parke, Putnam, Sullivan, Vermillion and Vigo

== Fallen officers ==
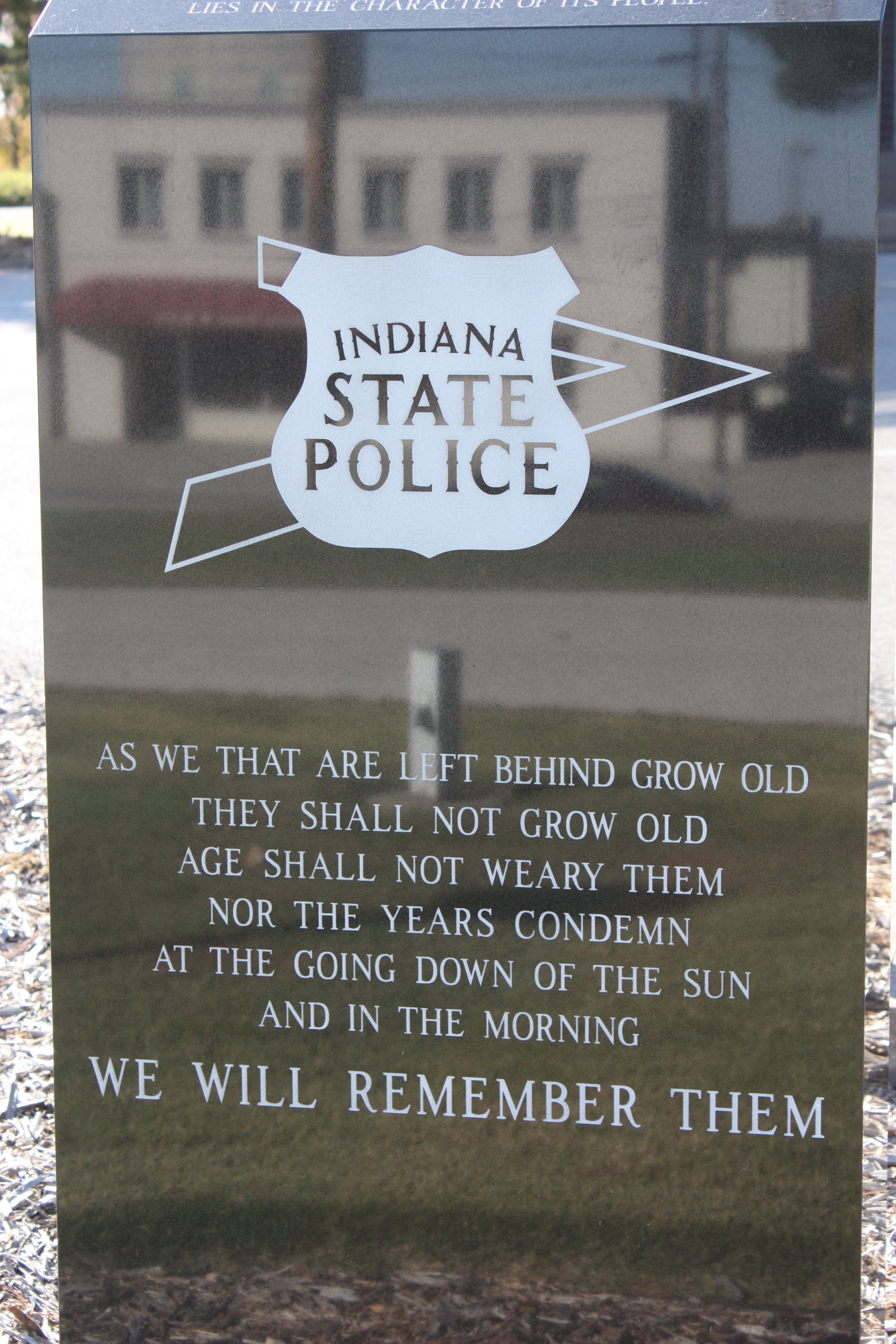
Memorial at Indiana State Police Post 34 in Jasper

In the history of the Indiana State Police, 46 troopers and three civilian employees have died in the line of duty. The agency honors its personnel who have given the ultimate sacrifice at its own memorial consisting of an eternal flame and three granite tablets inscribed with their names at a site located on the east side of Indianapolis just off of Post Road at Interstate 70. Their troopers are also honored on the Indiana Law Enforcement and Fire Fighters Memorial located at Bicentennial Plaza and Senate Avenue in Indianapolis, which was dedicated in 2001 to the memory of the state's fallen public safety officers, as well as in Washington at the National Law Enforcement Officers Memorial, which honors the nation's law enforcement officers who have died in the line of duty and was dedicated in 1991.

Name	Date of death	Age	Tenure	Cause of death	Notes
Trooper Eugene O. Teague	12–20–1933	24	6 months	Gunfire (Accidental)	^{[A]}
Trooper Paul V. Minneman	05–27–1937	33	1 year, 8 months	Gunfire	^{[B]}
Trooper William R. Dixon	06–27–1938	28	2 years, 9 months	Gunfire	^{[C]}
Trooper George A. Forster	05–17–1941	25	2 years, 8 months	Automobile accident	
Trooper Richard F. England	04–22–1942	31	6 years, 3 months	Automobile accident	
Trooper Herbert W. Smith	12–05–1946	29	4 years, 1 month	Gunfire	
Trooper Robert E. Clevenger	09–08–1953	22	1 year	Vehicle pursuit	
Sergeant Hubert C. Roush	01–26–1955	39	2 years, 4 months	Automobile accident	
Trooper Earl L. Brown	08–31–1955	42	14 years, 10 months	Gunfire	
Sergeant John R. Miller	09–05–1955	35	14 years	Aircraft accident	
Trooper Donald R. Turner	01–28–1956	37	9 years, 2 months	Struck by vehicle	
First Sergeant Marvin E. Walts	03–18–1957	49	19 years, 6 months	Gunfire	
Trooper William R. Kellems	09–30–1957	27	10 months	Gunfire	
Trooper John H. Powell	02–27–1959	27	4 years, 2 months	Struck by vehicle	
Trooper Robert J. Garrison	12–14–1959	27	4 years, 2 months	Automobile accident	
Trooper Robert C. Gillespie	06–08–1962	33	11 years, 9 months	Automobile accident	
Trooper William F. Kieser	03–09–1965	37	6 years, 11 months	Gunfire	
Trooper Oscar E. Mills	04–12–1966	35	2 years, 2 months	Vehicle pursuit	^{[D]}
Trooper William R. Rayner	12–18–1966	30	8 years, 3 months	Gunfire	
Trooper Richard G. Brown	09–27–1967	40	12 years, 4 months	Struck by vehicle	
Trooper Robert O. Lietzan	03–30–1969	31	7 years, 7 months	Gunfire	
Sergeant George W. Campbell	06–18–1969	44	18 years, 10 months	Heart attack	
Trooper John J. Streu	02–20–1971	25	10 months	Gunfire	^{[E]}
Sergeant Glen R. Hosier	04–26–1971	44	15 years, 11 months	Gunfire	
Trooper William J. Trees	06–26–1972	28	3 years, 9 months	Vehicle pursuit	
Trooper Lawrence B. Meyer	02–02–1974	37	5 years, 5 months	Heart attack	
Trooper Lewis E. Phillips	04–16–1975	26	2 years, 1 month	Automobile accident	
Trooper Roy E. Jones	07–03–1979	31	2 years, 8 months	Automobile accident	
Trooper Robert J. Lather II	07–06–1982	30	7 years, 6 months	Vehicular assault	
Trooper Steven L. Bailey	12–10–1983	29	5 years	Gunfire (Accidental)	
Sergeant John E. Hatfull	04–13–1987	45	14 years, 2 months	Gunfire	
Master Trooper Michael E. Greene	02–05–1993	43	16 years, 7 months	Gunfire	
Trooper Todd A. Burman	06–29–1993	28	2 years, 7 months	Gunfire	
Master Motor Carrier Inspector; Ralph R. Reed Jr.	08–03–1995	48	27 years, 3 months	Struck by vehicle	^{[F]}
DNA Supervisor; Kimberly S. Epperson	11–16–1995	36	10 years, 9 months	Automobile accident	^{[F]}
Trooper Andrew P. Winzenread	04–25–1997	26	2 years, 4 months	Struck by vehicle	
Senior Trooper James P. Bartram	03–31–1998	37	10 years, 3 months	Automobile accident	
Master Trooper David A. Deuter	07–16–1998	49	26 years, 3 months	Struck by vehicle	
Trooper Richard T. Gaston	03–04–1999	29	2 months	Vehicular assault	
Trooper Cory R. Elson	04–03–1999	26	3 months	Gunfire	
Trooper Jason E. Beal	01–15–2000	24	1 year, 1 month	Struck by vehicle	^{[G]}
Trooper Scott A. Patrick	12–22–2003	27	3 years, 5 months	Gunfire	
Lieutenant Gary E. Dudley	08–22–2006	51	26 years, 8 months	Bicycle accident	^{[H]}
Master Trooper David E. Rich	07–05–2007	41	17 years, 7 months	Gunfire	
Trooper Daniel R. Barrett	01–27–2008	25	6 months	Automobile accident	
Master Motor Carrier Inspector; Robert E. Pitcher	09–26–2010	64	22 years, 2 months	Automobile accident	^{[F]}
Trooper Peter R. Stephan	10–11–2019	27	3 years, 10 months	Automobile accident	
Master Trooper James R. Bailey	03–03–2023	50	15 years, 6 months	Vehicular assault	
Trooper Aaron N. Smith	06–28–2023	33	4 years, 11 months	Vehicular assault	

=== Notes ===
- ^{A} Trooper Teague was killed out-of-state in Paris, Edgar County, Illinois.
- ^{B} Trooper Minneman survived two days after his incident took place.
- ^{C} Trooper Dixon survived two days after his incident took place.
- ^{D} Trooper Mills survived eight years, 133 days after his incident took place.
- ^{E} Marshal James E. Larimer of the St. John, Indiana, Police Department was also killed in this incident.
- ^{F} A civilian employee who does not meet criteria for inclusion on the NLEOM.
- ^{G} Trooper Beal survived three days after his incident took place.
- ^{H} Deputy Chief Gary L. Martin of the Lake County, Indiana, Sheriff's Department was also killed in this incident.

== Breathalyzer ==
The Indiana State Police was the first law enforcement agency in North America to have authorized the use of the famed "Drunk-o-meter", a chemical test to determine levels of alcohol intoxication, which was invented in 1938 by Rolla N. Harger, M.D., a professor at Indiana University. In 1954, an improved version of the device followed and was called the Breathalyzer, invented by Indiana State Police Captain Robert F. Borkenstein in collaboration with Dr. Harger. This successful device has since been used by police agencies to assess alcohol impairment in drunken driving offenses.

== See also ==
- List of law enforcement agencies in Indiana
- Indiana State Police Pension Trust v. Chrysler LLC

== Bibliography ==
- Indiana Troopers Association (2009), Indiana State Police 75th Anniversary Historical Book, Evansville, Ind.: M.T. Publishing Company, Inc., ISBN 978-1-934729-22-9, OCLC 651915614
- Olsen, Marilyn B. (2001), Gangsters, Gunfire and Political Intrigue: The Story of the Indiana State Police, Indianapolis: .38 Special Press, ISBN 978-0-967574-93-6, OCLC 49527627
- Kellner, Esther (1983), Fifty years of service: The story of the Indiana State Police for their 50th anniversary 1933–1983, Cambridge City, Ind.: Optimist-Indiana State Police Respect for Law Camp, ASIN B0006YDTCG, OCLC 10110594
