= Kelner =

Kelner is a German-language surname, a variant of Kellner, which literally means "waiter". Notable people with the surname include:

- Martin Kelner, British journalist, author, comedian, singer, actor, and TV presenter
- Simon Kelner (born 1957), British journalist and newspaper editor
- Toni Kelner, American author

== See also ==
- Kneller
- Kilner
