= Saville Kellner =

South-African–American entrepreneur

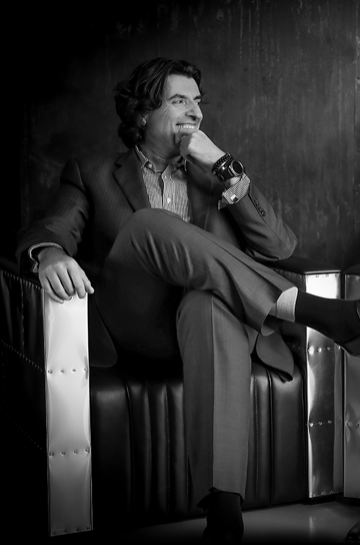
- Born: Kellner; December 3, 1961 (age 64); Cape Town, South Africa
- Citizenship: American
- Occupation: Entrepreneur
- Known for: CEO, Lake Industries

Saville Kellner (born December 3, 1961) is a Las Vegas entrepreneur and the CEO of Lake Industries.

== Early life ==
Born in Cape Town, South Africa in 1961, Saville emigrated to the United States in 1982 after both of his parents had died.

== Business career ==
After arriving in the US in 1982, Saville started selling cookware door to door with no financial resources and later founded Lake Industries; a wholesale supplier of kitchenware products. Aside from being the CEO of Lake Industries, Saville is also the CEO of JLS Financial, Black Card Radio and EggBank. He also founded other national and international companies over the past 30 years among which is his latest start-up known as Revenue Media Group.

Saville is a systemic Scleroderma patient and is very active in raising funds to find a cure for this disease. He sits on the board of director of St. Rose Hospital Foundation. He was formerly one of the Founding board members of the Nevada Boxing Hall of Fame. and former board member of Win-Win Entertainment.
