= Lorenz Kellner =

German educator

Lorenz Kellner (born at Kalteneber in the district of Eichsfeld, 29 January 1811; died at Trier, 18 August 1892) was a German educator.

== Life ==
He was the son of Heinrich Kellner, who had been a pupil of Pestalozzi at Yverdon and had introduced Pestalozzi's methods at the normal school he conducted, the first of its kind in the Catholic district of Eichsfeld. Out of these private courses for the training of elementary school-teachers developed a seminary for teachers at Heiligenstadt.

Lorenz Kellner graduated at the Gymnasium Josephinum at Hildesheim, and then studied at the evangelical seminary for teachers at Magdeburg. After being a teacher at the Catholic elementary school at Erfurt for two years, he was made rector of the school.

In 1836, his father's normal school was enlarged into a seminary for teachers, of which the elder Kellner remained the head while Lorenz was made his only assistant. In 1848 von Eichhorn, the Prussian minister of worship and education, called Lorenz to Marienwerder in West Prussia as member of the government district council and of the school-board. After seven years at Marienwerder, Kellner was summoned to fill the same offices at Trier. Since there were at this date no institutions for the training of teachers in Trier, Kellner founded several seminaries both for male and female teachers during the twenty-nine years of his official activity here.

In 1863 the Academy of Münster in Westphalia made Kellner Doctor of Philosophy honoris causa, in recognition of his services on behalf of the German language and of pedagogics.

== Works ==
In his major work, "Praktischer Lehrgang für den deutschen Unterricht" (1837–40), the teaching of grammar was systematically connected with the reading-book. This was, for that period, an important advance when contrasted with the current methods of grammatical instruction. In 1850 appeared his best-known work, "Zur Pädagogik der Schule und des Hauses. Aphorismen", which was translated into several languages. It contains altogether 178 essays which cover the entire field of training and teaching.

His "Skizzen und Bilder aus der Erziehungsgeschichte" (3 vols., 1862) was the first treatment of the history of pedagogics by a Catholic author. Kellner's "Kurze Geschichte der Erziehung und des Unterrichts" (1877) is a book of practical suggestions for teachers; his "Volksschulkunde" was a theoretical and practical guide for Catholic teachers of both sexes, school inspectors, and seminaries. Other works were "Lebensblätter, Erinnerungen aus der Schulwelt" (1891) and the posthumous "Lose Blätter, Pädagog. Zeitbetrachtungen und Ratschläge von Kellner" (1897).
