= Ernest Augustus Kellner =

English singer, pianist, teacher and composer (1792-1839)

Ernest Augustus Kellner (26 January 1792 – 18 July 1839) was an English singer, pianist, teacher and composer. After performing under royal patronage at an early age, he studied in Italy and became a teacher and performer in England and Italy, also giving concerts elsewhere in Europe.

== Life ==
Kellner was born in Windsor, Berkshire in 1792, the son of an oboe player from Saxe-Weimar in Queen Charlotte's private band. Before he was two years of age he began to learn the piano; at five he played one of Handel's concertos before the royal family. His boy's voice was regarded as having a beautiful quality, and was trained, at the King's wish, by Sir William Parsons. Kellner first sang at a court concert when eight years old. He continued under the immediate patronage of royalty until his father made engagements for him to sing in public. After this the child was heard at the Glee Club, Catch Club, and Ancient Concerts (as soloist in 1802).

In 1805 Kellner was a midshipman on HMS Plover, and afterwards on HMS Acasta (1797); but when this ship was ordered to a West Indian station his parents induced him to leave the navy. His voice had changed to a baritone. In 1809–10 he had some instruction from Venanzio Rauzzini in Bath, Somerset, and sang at the Theatre Royal. He afterwards made tours with Charles Incledon, and was engaged in 1813–14 for concerts in London. In 1815 he married, went to Italy, and studied with great industry under Porri in Florence, and in 1817 under Casella and Andrea Nozzari in Naples, where he gave two concerts, and under Girolamo Crescentini in Bologna. When passing through the principal towns of Switzerland, Bavaria and Saxe-Weimar, Kellner gave successful soirées musicales, at which he was accustomed to sing four pieces and to play the same number.

He settled in London as a teacher in December 1820, and sang in the following three seasons at the Philharmonic and other London concerts. A contemporary criticism complained that the rich lower tones of Kellner's voice had died, and that "its extension upwards by no means compensated for the loss. At the fifth Philharmonic concert he sang Ferdinando Paer's 'Se far sogno i miei tormenti', but with little of the characteristic marking which the author intended, or which just feeling and good taste would dictate.... His technical knowledge is unquestionable; he wants the poetry of his art." The Harmonicon of 1823 records Kellner's co-operation in concerted vocal music, but makes no mention of soli, during that season. He sang in the provinces with Angelica Catalani in 1822.

Kellner was also appointed choirmaster at the Bavarian Chapel; but in 1824 he left England for Venice, where he sang at La Fenice with success. An illness obliged him to cancel an engagement at Parma, where, however, a mass of his composition was performed at the archduchess's chapel, and he was appointed court pianist. He taught music in Florence for some time. In the course of a concert tour in 1828 he visited Odesa and St Petersburg (1829–33), Paris, and London again (1834), where he employed himself in teaching and writing. He died on 18 July 1839.

== Works ==
Kellner's hundred or more manuscript compositions include several masses performed at the Bavarian Chapel; an unfinished dramatic piece founded on the revolution in Poland; some lyrical and other poems, and essays on musical education.

His published songs include "County Guy" and "The lasses with a simpering air" (1824?); "The Blind Mother", "Speak on", "Shepherd's Chief Mourner", "Medora's Song", and "Though all my dreams" (1835–9). Kellner composed a symphony and fugue for voices in Bologna, which obtained for him the membership of the Accademia Filarmonica di Bologna.
