= Birgit Kellner =

Austrian Buddhologist and Tibetologist

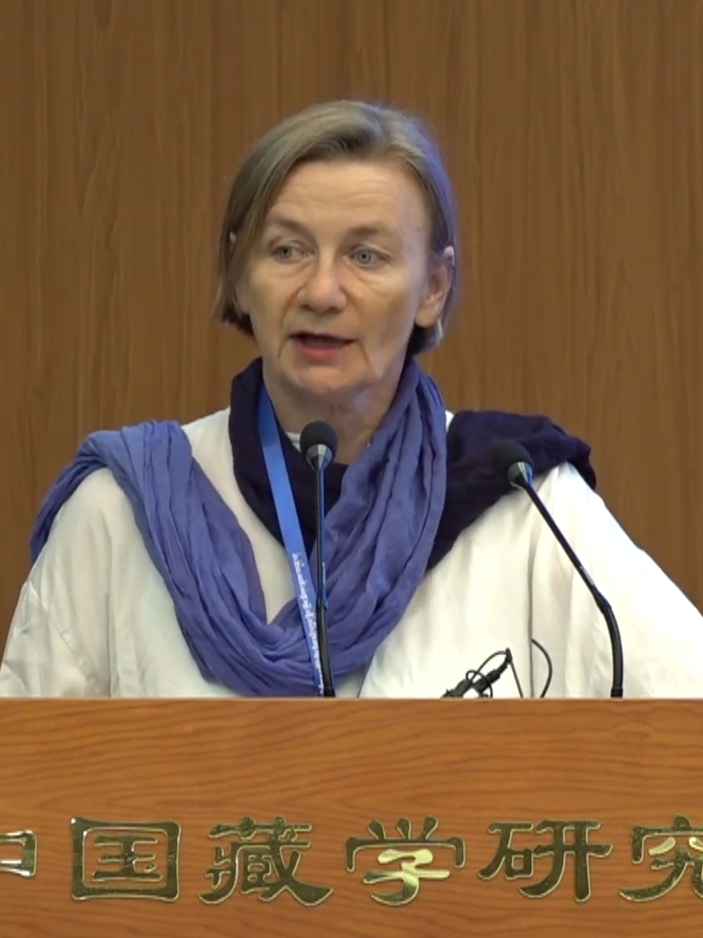
- Birgit Kellner in 2023
- Education: University of Vienna
- Scientific career
- Fields: Buddhology, Tibetology
- Doctoral advisor: Katsura Shōryū

Birgit Kellner is an Austrian Buddhologist and Tibetologist. She studied Buddhology and Tibetology at University of Vienna, where she received a master's degree in 1994 under the supervision of Ernst Steinkellner, and at the Hiroshima University, where she earned her doctorate in 1999 under the supervision of Katsura Shōryū.

After a series of research projects, including as a Humboldt Fellow at the University of Hamburg, as well as a visiting professor at the University of California at Berkeley, she joined the University of Heidelberg in 2010 as Professor of Buddhist Studies within the Cluster of Excellence "Asia and Europe in a Global Context". In 2015, she returned to Austria to serve as the Director of the Institute for Cultural and Intellectual History of Asia in Vienna, part of the Austrian Academy of Sciences.

== Selected publications ==
- Jñānaśrīmitra’s Anupalabdhirahasya and Sarvaśabdābhāvacarcā: A Critical Edition with a Survey of his Anupalabdhi-Theory. Wien: Wiener Studien zur Tibetologie und Buddhismuskunde 67, 2007
- Nichts bleibt nichts. Die buddhistische Zurückweisung von Kumārilas abhāvapramāṇa. Übersetzung und Interpretation von Śāntarakṣitas Tattvasaṅgraha vv. 1647-1690 mit Kamalaśīas Tattvasaṅgrahapañjikā sowie Ansätze und Arbeitshypothesen zur Geschichte negativer Erkenntnis in der indischen Philosophie. Wien: Wiener Studien zur Tibetologie und Buddhismuskunde 39, 1997
