= Ben Kilner (rugby league) =

English professional rugby league footballer

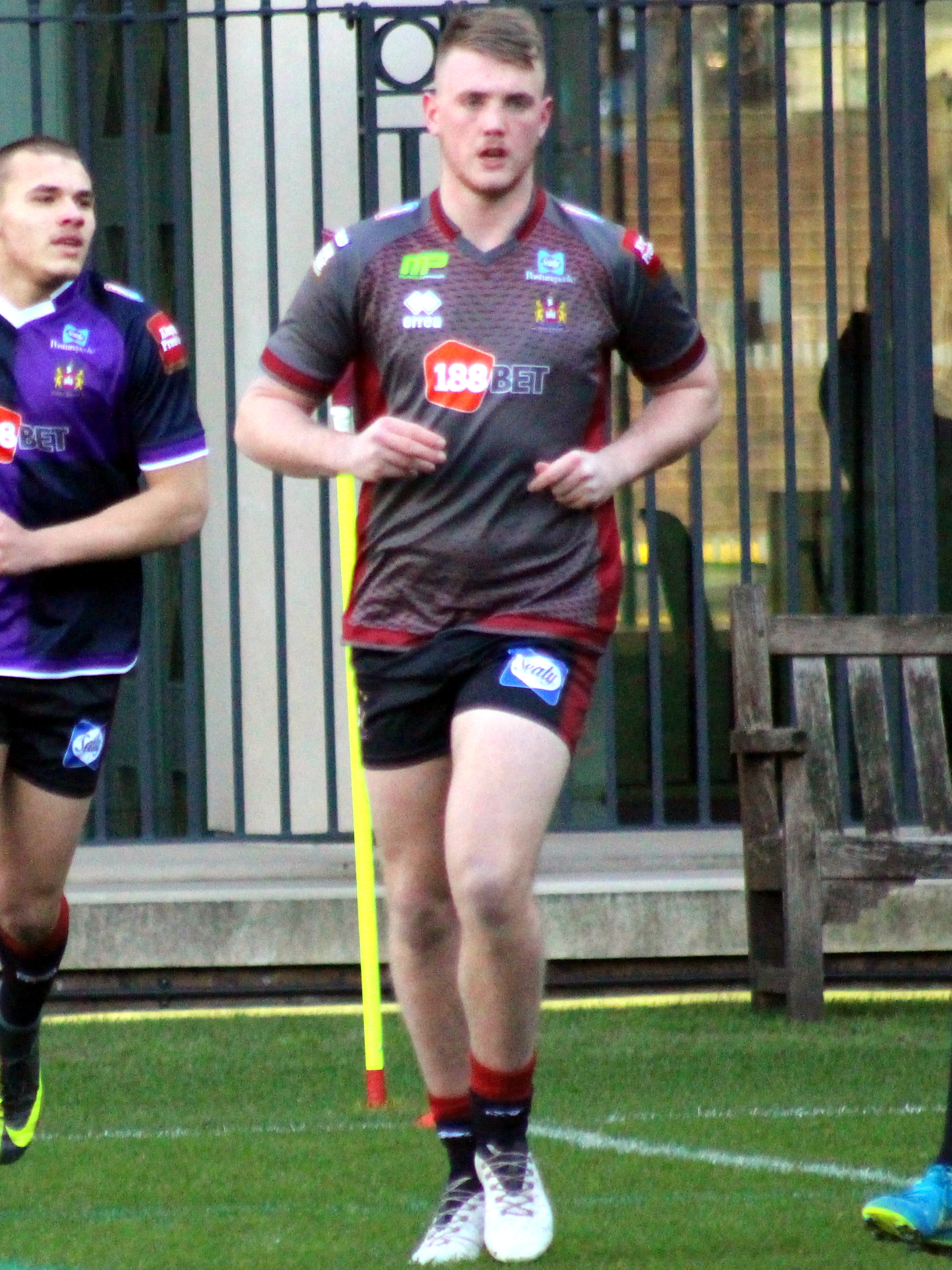

Personal information
- Full name: Benjamin Kilner
- Born: 11 May 1999 (age 26) Normanton, West Yorkshire, England

Playing information
- Height: 6 ft 5 in (1.95 m)
- Weight: 17 st 11 lb (113 kg)
- Position: Prop
Club
Years	Team	Pld	T	G	FG	P
2018–21	Wigan Warriors	1	0	0	0	0
2018(loan)	→ Leigh Centurions	1	0	0	0	0
2019(loan)	→ Dewsbury Rams	4	0	0	0	0
2019(loan)	→ Rochdale Hornets	6	0	0	0	0
	Total	12	0	0	0	0

Ben Kilner is a British former professional rugby league footballer who played as a prop for the Wigan Warriors in the Super League.

He spent on time on from Wigan at Leigh Centurions, Dewsbury Rams and Rochdale Hornets in the Championship.

== Career ==
Kilner played his amateur rugby league for the Oulton Raiders. In 2015 he joined Wigan on the club's scholarship scheme and played for Wigan's victorious academy side in the 2017 and 2018 Academy Grand Finals.

In 2018 he made his first first-class appearances while on loan at Championship side, Leigh. The following season he spent time on loan at two more Championship clubs, Dewsbury and Rochdale. At the start of the 2020 season Wigan loaned him to Toronto Wolfpack but because of the COVID-19 pandemic he did not make any appearances for the Canadian side. His only first team appearance for Wigan came in round 14 of the 2020 Super League season for the Warriors against St Helens where Wigan went on to lose 42–0 against a much more experienced St Helens squad. Kilner started from the bench centre and became Wigan Warriors player #1108.

On 28 May 2021 Kilner announced his retirement from rugby league due to injury and also due to a desire to follow a different career.
