= Esther Kellner =

American novelist

Esther Kellner (1908–1998) was a writer, animal lover, and served as director of Wayne County, Indiana, Civil Defense.

== Early life and education ==
Kellner was born in New Lisbon, Indiana, in 1908, and was part of Morton High School's 1926 graduating class in Richmond, Indiana. Kellner's writing career began at age 20, when she was the editor of a children's magazine named Play Mate.

== Career ==
Kellner's involvement with the Wayne County Civil Defense began in 1965 while writing the book The Long Silence. The book is about a fire that destroyed the local phone company's switch office, leaving the surrounding area without service for a few months. Another book of hers, Death in a Sunny Street, told of the devastating 1968 Richmond, Indiana, explosion that killed 41 people and destroyed several downtown blocks.

Kellner wrote seventeen books in total, including: The Devil and Aunt Serena, Moonshine: Its History and Folklore, and The Background of the Old Testament. She wrote both fiction and non-fiction books.

Kellner was known as a friend to lost and injured animals, and wrote Animals Come to My House: A Story Guide to the Care of Small Wild Animals.

== Published works ==
=== Fiction ===
- Mary of Nazareth (Appleton-Century-Crofts, 1958)
- The Promise (1956)
- The Bride of Pilate (1959)

=== Nonfiction ===
- Animals Come to My House (New York: Putnam, c1976)
- Background of the Old Testament (1963)
- Death in a Sunny Street (1968) about the Richmond, Indiana, explosion that occurred on April 6, 1968.
- Devil and Aunt Serena (1968)
- Long Silence (1965)
- Moonshine (1971)
- Out of the Woods (1964)
