= Marshall, Indiana =

- Town
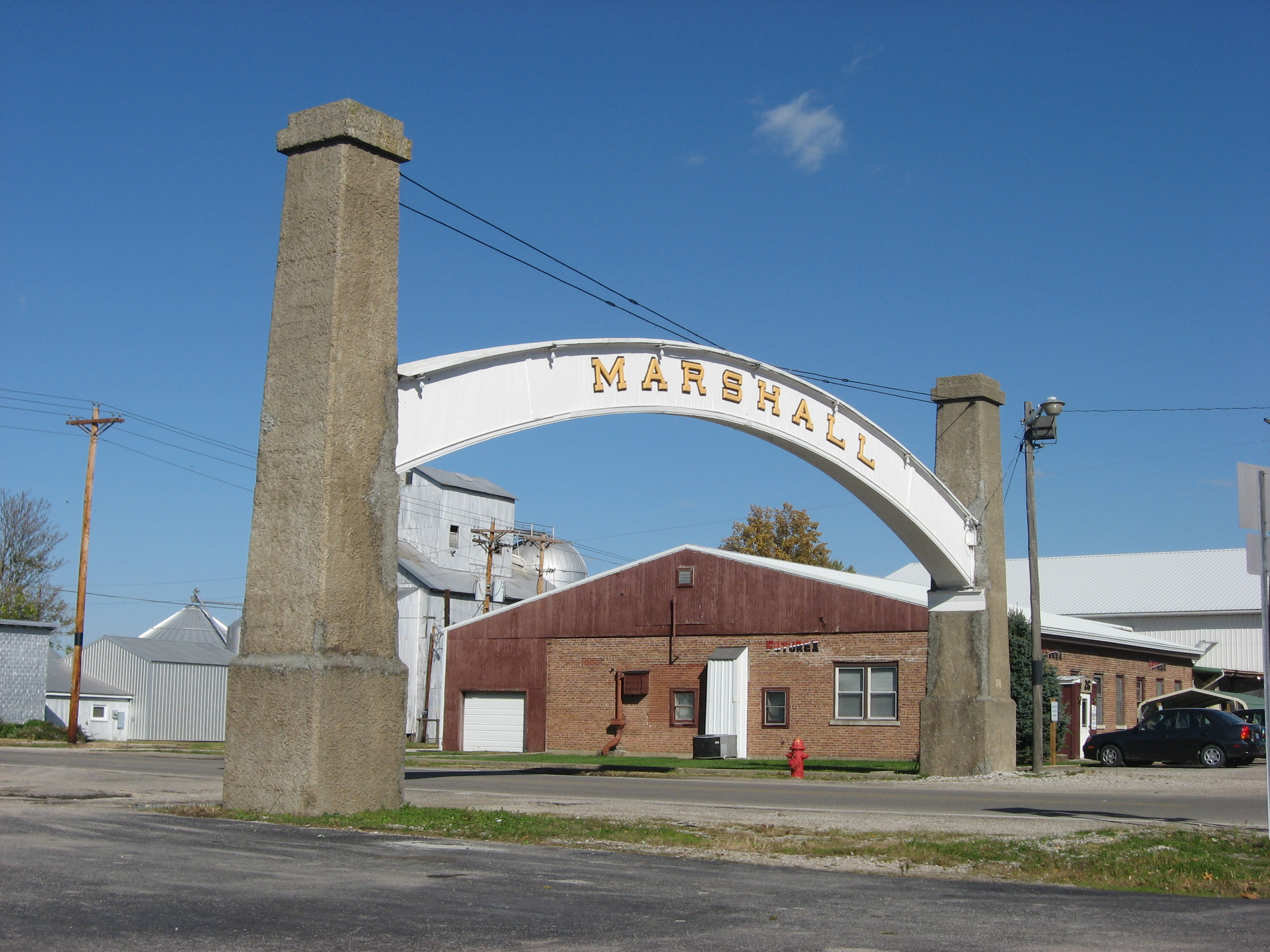
- The Arch in the Town of Marshall

- Location of Marshall in Parke County, Indiana.

- Location in Parke County
- Coordinates: 39°50′52″N 87°11′12″W
- Country: United States
- State: Indiana
- County: Parke
- Township: Washington

Area
  - Total: 0.25 sq mi (0.66 km^{2})
  - Land: 0.25 sq mi (0.66 km^{2})
  - Water: 0 sq mi (0.00 km^{2})
- Elevation: 705 ft (215 m)

Population (2020)
  - Total: 274
  - Density: 1,070.6/sq mi (413.38/km^{2})
- Time zone: UTC-5 (Eastern (EST))
  - Summer (DST): UTC-4 (EDT)
- ZIP code: 47859
- Area code: 765
- FIPS code: 18-47322
- GNIS feature ID: 2396738

Marshall is a town in Washington Township, Parke County, Indiana, United States. As of the 2020 census, the population was 274.

== History ==
A post office has been in operation at Marshall since 1878. The town was named for Mahlon W. Marshall, an original owner of the town site.

The Arch in the Town of Marshall was listed on the National Register of Historic Places in 1985.

== Geography ==
According to the 2010 census, Marshall has a total area of 0.26 square miles (0.67 km^{2}), all land.

== Demographics ==
=== 2020 census ===
As of the census of 2020, there were 324 people, 128 houses, and the average family size was 2.82 people. The population density was 1,070.31 people per square mile (413.38 per kilometer). The racial makeup was 94% White, <.1% Native American, Hispanic or Latino of any race were 2% of the population.

There were 128 households, 114 of which were occupied. 82% of those were married couples living together, 11% had a female householder with no husband present, and 8% had a male householder with no wife present. The average rent was $1,110.

The median age in the town was 48.2 years. 14% of residents were under the age of 18; 5% were between the ages of 18 and 24; 23% were from 25 to 44; 45% were from 45 to 64; 14% were over the age of 65. The gender makeup of the town was 47% male and 53% female.

Historical population
Census	Pop.	Note	%±
1910	334		—
1920	334		0.0%
1930	293		−12.3%
1940	321		9.6%
1950	326		1.6%
1960	360		10.4%
1970	365		1.4%
1980	413		13.2%
1990	379		−8.2%
2000	360		−5.0%
2010	324		−10.0%
2020	274		−15.4%
U.S. Decennial Census

=== 2010 census ===
As of the census of 2010, there were 324 people, 121 households, and 90 families living in the town. The population density was 1,246.2 inhabitants per square mile (481.2/km^{2}). There were 136 housing units at an average density of 523.1 per square mile (202.0/km^{2}). The racial makeup of the town was 98.5% White, 1.2% Native American, and 0.3% from other races. Hispanic or Latino of any race were 1.2% of the population.

There were 121 households, of which 34.7% had children under the age of 18 living with them, 57.0% were married couples living together, 12.4% had a female householder with no husband present, 5.0% had a male householder with no wife present, and 25.6% were non-families. 19.0% of all households were made up of individuals, and 7.5% had someone living alone who was 65 years of age or older. The average household size was 2.68 and the average family size was 3.06.

The median age in the town was 39.6 years. 23.8% of residents were under the age of 18; 10.4% were between the ages of 18 and 24; 23.1% were from 25 to 44; 29.9% were from 45 to 64; and 12.7% were 65 years of age or older. The gender makeup of the town was 46.9% male and 53.1% female.

=== 2000 census ===
As of the census of 2000, there were 360 people, 131 households, and 96 families living in the town. The population density was 1,464.4 inhabitants per square mile (565.4/km^{2}). There were 144 housing units at an average density of 585.8 per square mile (226.2/km^{2}). The racial makeup of the town was 99.17% White and 0.83% from two or more races.

There were 131 households, out of which 39.7% had children under the age of 18 living with them, 60.3% were married couples living together, 13.0% had a female householder with no husband present, and 26.0% were non-families. 22.9% of all households were made up of individuals, and 10.7% had someone living alone who was 65 years of age or older. The average household size was 2.75 and the average family size was 3.26.

In the town, the population was spread out, with 33.1% under the age of 18, 8.9% from 18 to 24, 27.2% from 25 to 44, 18.6% from 45 to 64, and 12.2% who were 65 years of age or older. The median age was 30 years. For every 100 females, there were 102.2 males. For every 100 females age 18 and over, there were 91.3 males.

The median income for a household in the town was $33,906, and the median income for a family was $36,042. Males had a median income of $30,417 versus $22,292 for females. The per capita income for the town was $12,889. About 8.4% of families and 16.7% of the population were below the poverty line, including 26.2% of those under age 18 and 2.5% of those age 65 or over.

== Education ==
Marshall is in the North Central Parke Community School Corporation. Formerly it was in the Turkey Run Community School Corporation school district.
