= Quezon (disambiguation) =

Quezon is a province in the Philippines.

Quezon may also refer to:

== Places in the Philippines ==
- Quezon, Quezon, a municipality in the province of Quezon
- Quezon City, a highly urbanized city in Metro Manila
- Quezon, Bukidnon, a municipality
- Quezon, Isabela, a municipality
- Quezon, Nueva Ecija, a municipality
- Quezon, Nueva Vizcaya, a municipality
- Quezon, Palawan, a municipality

== Film ==
- Quezon, a 2025 Philippine film

== Other uses ==
- BRP Quezon (PS-70), a ship of the Philippine Navy

== See also ==
- Quezon (surname)
