= Bacolod (disambiguation) =

Bacolod is a highly urbanized city and the capital city of Negros Occidental, Philippines. It may also refer to:

== Places ==
- Bacolod, Lanao del Norte, a municipality in Lanao del Norte, Philippines
- Bacolod-Kalawi, Lanao del Sur, a municipality in Lanao del Sur, Philippines
- Metro Bacolod, a metropolitan area in Negros Occidental, Philippines centered on Bacolod City

== People ==
- Mark Shandii Bacolod (1984–2022), a Filipino director and producer
- Nikki Bacolod (born 1989), Filipina singer, television host, swimmer and actress

== Ships ==
- Bacolod City-class logistics support vessel, a class of transport ships of the Philippine Navy
- BRP Bacolod City (LC-550), a transport ship of the Philippine Navy
