= Rizal-class corvette =

1967 class of Philippine Navy ships

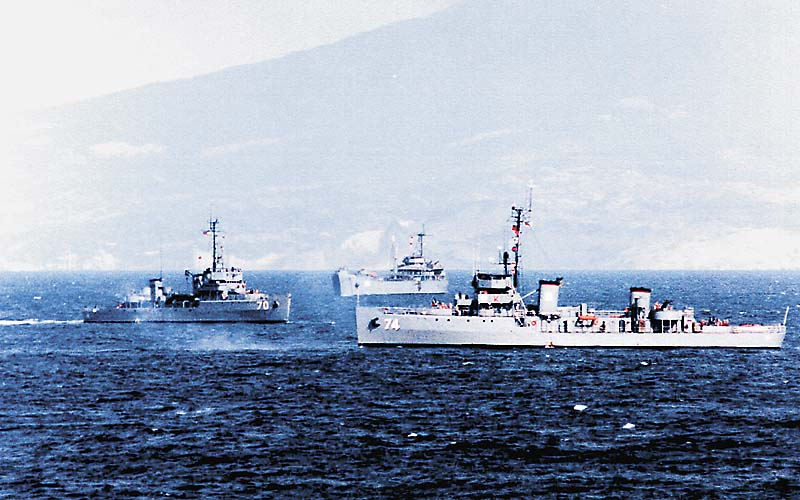
- BRP Rizal (PS-74) and BRP Quezon (PS-70)

Class overview
- Name: Rizal class Patrol Corvette
- Builders: Associated Shipbuilding Corp. and Savannah Machine and Foundry Co., USA
- Operators: Philippine Navy
- Preceded by: Miguel Malvar class corvette
- Succeeded by: Jacinto class corvette
- Retired: 2

General characteristics
- Class & type: Rizal class
- Type: Patrol Corvette
- Displacement: 1,090 tons standard, 1,250 tons full load
- Length: 221.67 ft (67.57 m)
- Beam: 32.67 ft (9.96 m)
- Draft: 10.75 ft (3.28 m)
- Installed power: 5,800 shp (4,300 kW)
- Propulsion: 2 × GM EMD 16V-645E6 Diesel Engines
- Speed: 18 knots (33 km/h) maximum
- Range: 5,000 nmi (9,300 km) at 14 knots (26 km/h)
- Complement: 80
- Sensors & processing systems: Raytheon SPS-5C G/H-band Surface Search Radar; DAS 3 I-band Navigation Radar; SQS-17B hull-mounted Sonar (high frequency); Mk52 GFCS for 3"/50 guns; Mk51 GFCS for 40 mm guns
- Armament: 2 × 3"/50 caliber gun Mk26 dual purpose guns; 2 × Twin Bofors 40 mm gun; 2 × Twin 20 mm Oerlikon guns; 4 × 50 caliber machine guns

The Rizal class was a ship class of two patrol corvettes formerly operated by the Philippine Navy. These ships were formerly used by the US Navy as Auk class minesweepers. Under the Philippine Navy, the two vessels have undergone upgrades and modification, and were categorized as corvettes.

Both ships have been retired from service by the Philippine Navy.

== History ==
The Auk class of naval ships were Allied minesweepers serving with the United States Navy and the British Royal Navy during the Second World War. In total, there were a recorded 95 Auk class minesweepers under Allied command during that time.

Thirty-two minesweepers were ordered by the US (as BAM-1 to 32) intending them to be supplied to the Royal Navy under Lend-lease but 12 were retained for USN use and given names and "AM" hull classification prefix. Those transferred were given "J" pennant number prefixes and formed the Catherine class

Eleven minesweepers of the Auk class were lost in World War II; only one (USS Skill) was sunk — by U-593.

Out of the reserved US Navy units, two were transferred to the Philippines as part of the US Military Assistance Program, these were USS Murrelet (renamed BRP Rizal) in 1965, and USS Vigilance (renamed BRP Quezon) in 1967.

Both ships were stricken in 1994, but were overhauled with assistance from Hatch & Kirk, Inc., and returned to service in 1995–1996. Recent upgrades include a satellite radio dish for communications. As of 2008, both ships are still on the active roster of the Philippine Navy, and are assigned with the Patrol Force.

With over 50 years of active duty with the Philippine Navy, both have been involved in local and international crisis, exercises, and incidents.

== Technical details ==
Although fairly armed for her size, her weapon systems are manually operated and are of World War II origin.

The two Mk24 3"/50 caliber guns, the ships' primary weapons, have a range of up to 14,600 yards (13,400 m) yards and are also capable of anti-aircraft warfare.

In addition to the above-mentioned guns, she also carries a total of two twin Mk1 Bofors 40 mm anti-aircraft guns, two twin Mk4 20 mm Oerlikon cannons, and four 50 caliber machine guns.

The ship is powered by two EMD 16-645E7 diesel engines with a combined power of around 5,800 bhp (4,300 kW) driving two propellers. The main engines can propel the 1,250 ton (full load) ship at a maximum speed of around 18 knots (33 km/h). It has a maximum range of 5,000 nautical miles (9,260 km) at a speed of 12 knots (22 km/h).

== Ships in Class ==
| Bow number | Ship name | Launched | Commissioned | Decommissioned | Service | Status |
|---|---|---|---|---|---|---|
| PS-70 | BRP Quezon | 5 April 1943 | 19 August 1967 | 1 March 2021 | Offshore Combat Force, Philippine Navy | Decommissioned |
| PS-74 | BRP Rizal | 29 December 1944 | 18 June 1965 | 29 January 2020 | Offshore Combat Force, Philippine Navy | Decommissioned |

== Gallery ==
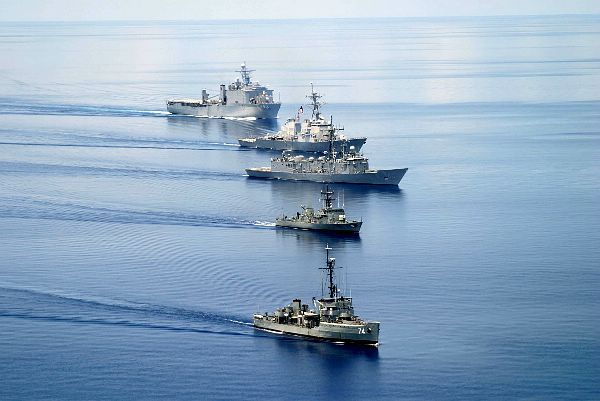
Representing the Philippine Navy together with BRP Emilio Jacinto (PS-35) at a CARAT exercise with the US Navy.

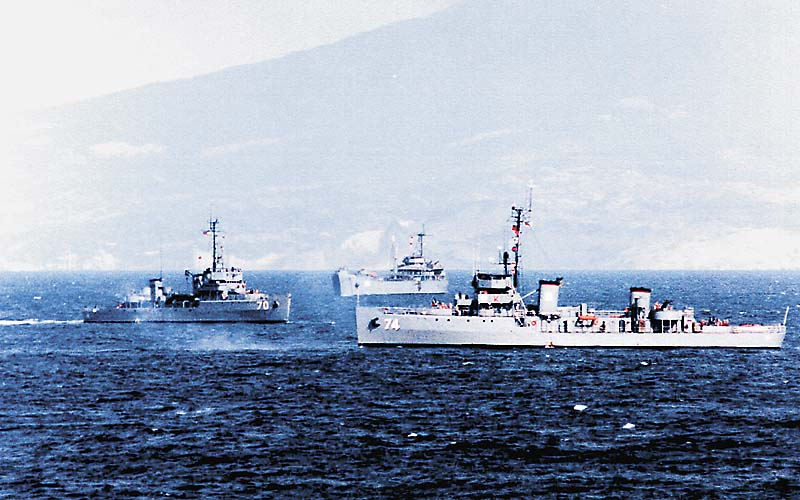
The two Rizal Class corvettes at the Balikatan 2000 exercises.

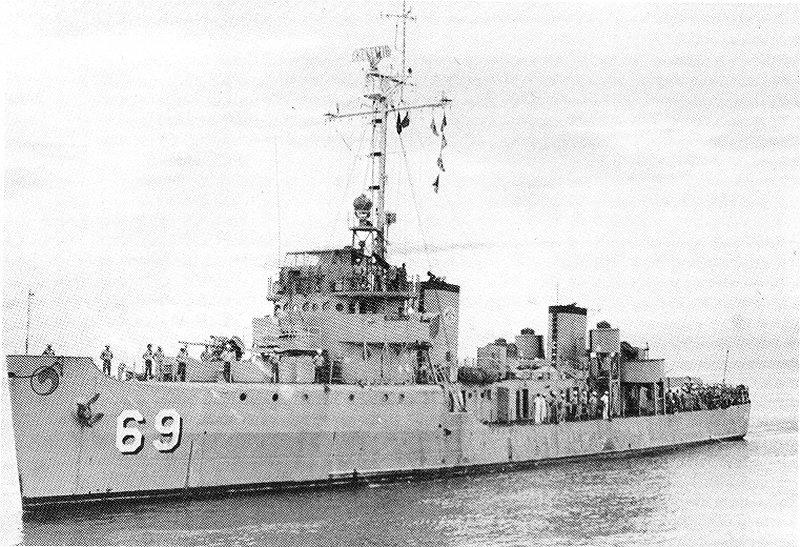
RPS Rizal (PS-69)

== See also ==
- Philippine Navy
- Auk class minesweeper
- List of decommissioned ships of the Philippine Navy
