= BRP Rizal =

Philippine Navy ship

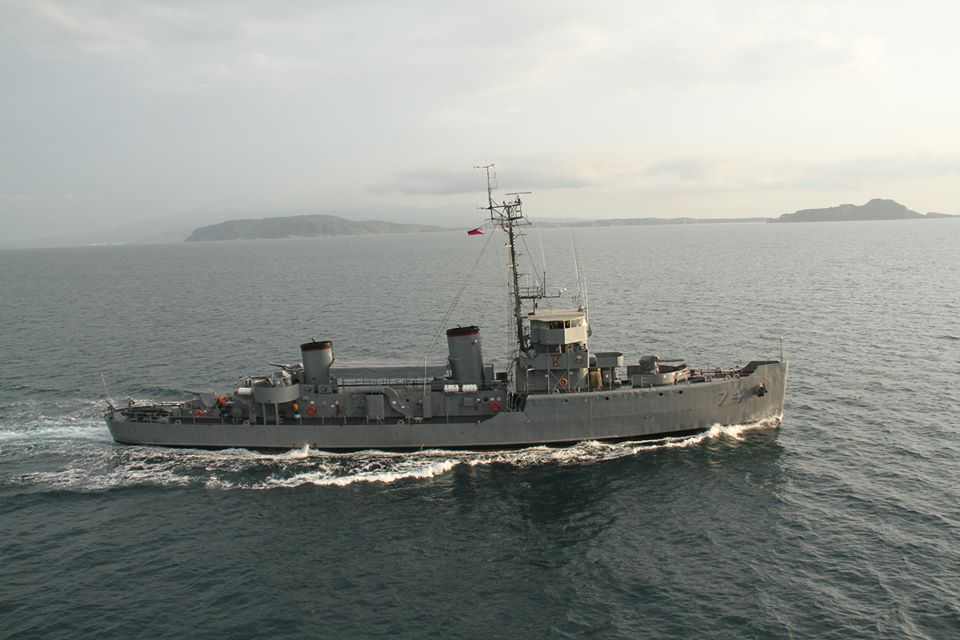
- BRP Rizal taken in 2016

History

United States
- Name: Murrelet
- Builder: Savannah Machine and Foundry Co., Savannah, GA
- Laid down: 24 August 1944
- Launched: 29 December 1944
- Commissioned: 24 August 1945
- Decommissioned: 14 March 1957
- Stricken: 1 December 1964
- Fate: Transferred to Philippine Navy in 1965.
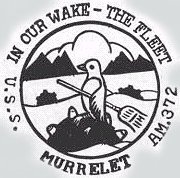
- Badge

Philippines
- Name: Rizal
- Namesake: Province of Rizal in Luzon Island
- Operator: Philippine Navy
- Commissioned: 18 June 1965
- Decommissioned: 29 January 2020
- Renamed: RPS Rizal (PS-69) from 1965; BRP Rizal (PS-74) from 1996
- Fate: Awaiting conversion to a museum ship
- Status: Retired
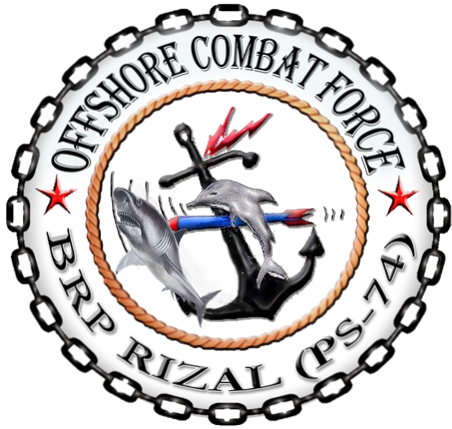
- Badge

General characteristics
- Class & type: Rizal-class patrol corvette
- Displacement: 890 tons standard, 1,250 tons full load
- Length: 221.67 ft (67.57 m)
- Beam: 32.67 ft (9.96 m)
- Draft: 10.75 ft (3.28 m)
- Installed power: 5,800 shp (4,300 kW)
- Propulsion: 2 × EMD 16V-645C Diesel Engines
- Speed: 18 knots (33 km/h) maximum
- Range: 5,000 nmi (9,300 km) at 14 knots (26 km/h)
- Complement: 80
- Sensors & processing systems: Raytheon SPS-5C G/H-band Surface Search Radar; Raytheon SPS-64(V)11 Radar; DAS 3 I-band Navigation Radar; SQS-17B hull-mounted Sonar (high frequency); Mk52 GFCS for 3"/50 guns; Mk51 GFCS for 40 mm guns
- Armament: 2 × 3"/50-caliber gun Mk22 dual-purpose guns; 2 × Mk1 Mod2 Twin 60 caliber Bofors 40 mm gun; 2 × Twin 70 caliber 20 mm Oerlikon guns; 4 × .50 cal (12.7 mm) machine guns

BRP Rizal (PS-74) was the lead ship and first of two Rizal-class ships in service with the Philippine Navy. She was an ex-United States Navy Auk-class minesweeper that was produced during World War II, and was classified as a patrol corvette protecting the vast waters of the Philippines. Along with other ex-World War II veteran ships of the Philippine Navy, she was considered one of the oldest active fighting ships in the world, until 2020.

== History ==
=== US Navy (1945–1965) ===
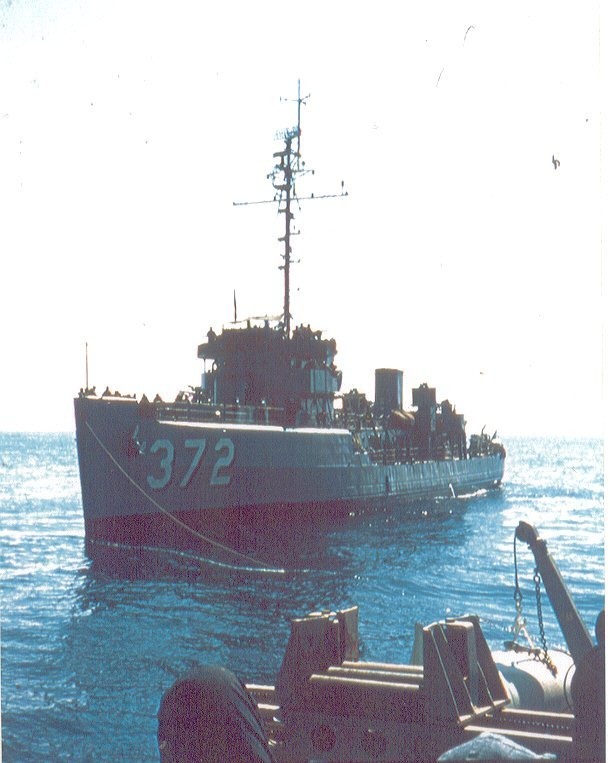
as USS Murrelet (AM-372)

USS Murrelet (AM-372) was commissioned with the US Navy in 1945, her duty was to sweep mines along the Japanese and Korean waters from January to April 1946. She was decommissioned in 1948 and was placed with the Pacific Reserve Fleet.

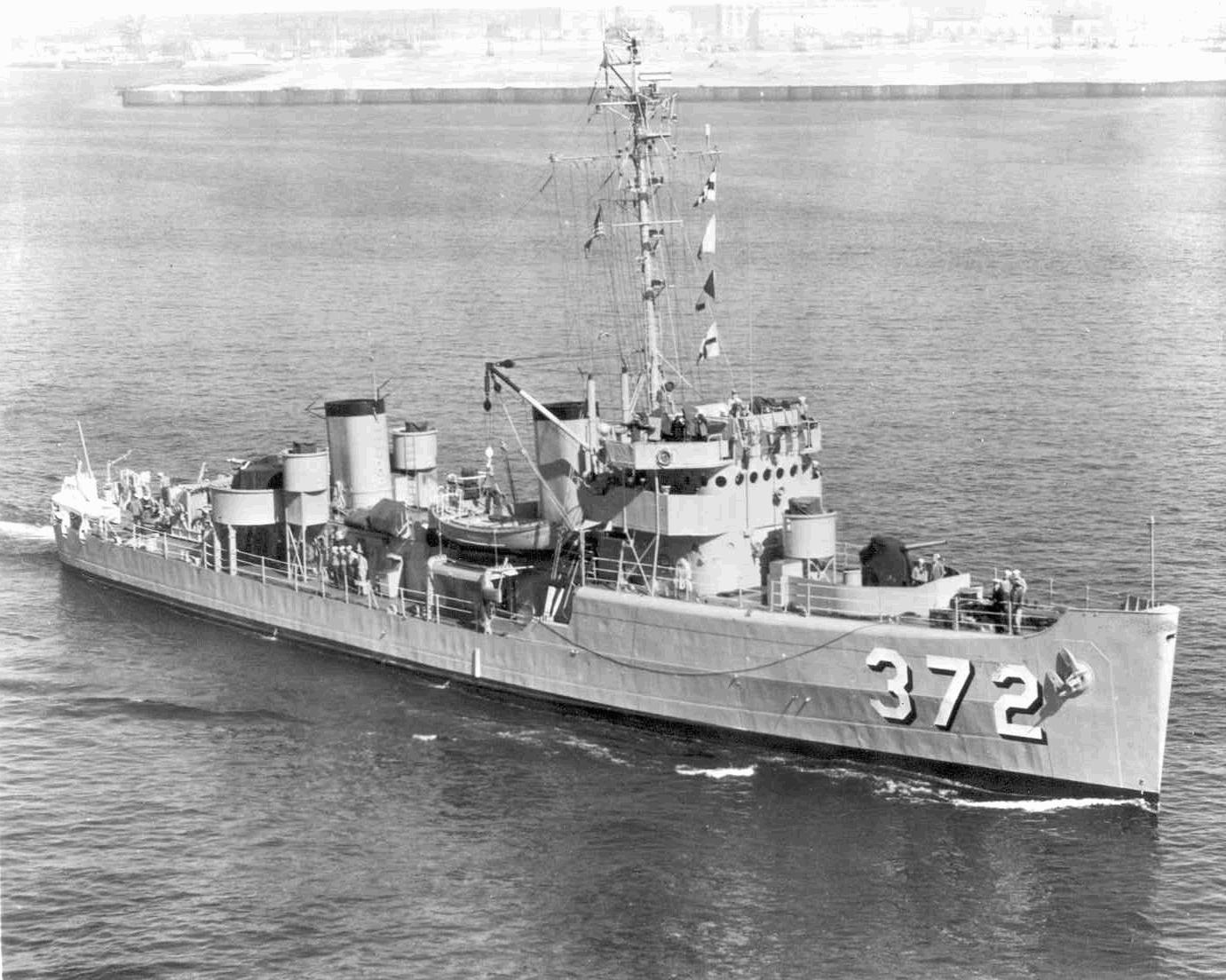
another photo of USS Murrelet

She was again recommissioned in 1950. She arrived Yokosuka, Japan, in August 1951 to aid United Nations forces opposing Communist aggression. Departing Yokosuka 21 August, she sailed to Korea, participating in operations north of Wonsan, in the Hungnam, Songjin, and Chongjin areas. She continued sweeping and patrol duties off Korea in 1952, capturing and destroying several enemy sampans, until July, when she returned to the west coast. Murrelet started a second tour of duty off Korea in April 1953, returning to Long Beach in December. Murrelet received five battle stars for Korean service.

Redesignated MSF-372, 7 February 1955, she continued to operate off the west coast. She decommissioned 14 March 1957, and was assigned to the Pacific Reserve fleet. Struck from the Naval Register 1 December 1964, she was transferred 18 June 1965 to the Philippine Republic under the Military Assistance Program.

=== Philippine Navy (1965–2020) ===
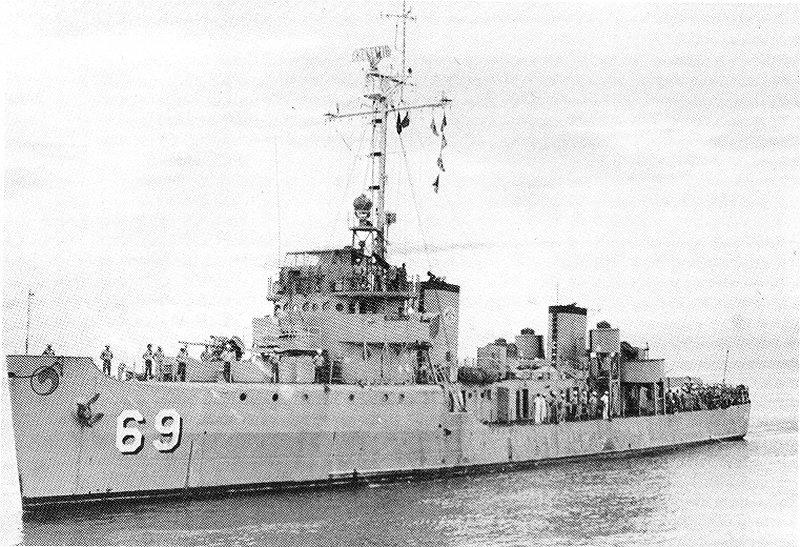
as RPS Rizal (PS-69)

She was commissioned with the Philippine Navy on 18 June 1965 and was renamed RPS Rizal (E-69), but was later on re-classified as a corvette and renamed to RPS Rizal (PS-69) under a new ship classification scheme implemented between 1965 and 1966. Again in June 1980 she was renamed BRP Rizal (PS-69) using a new localized prefix.

She was stricken from the navy in 1994, but was overhauled and returned to service in 1995. Some of her weapons were also removed, mainly its anti-submarine equipment due to lack of spare parts. This includes the five Mk6 depth charge projectors and two depth charge racks. This move totally removed her anti-submarine warfare capabilities, which is in fact outdated at present conditions. Rizal completed restoration works in January 1996, wherein she was renumbered and recommissioned as BRP Rizal (PS-74), which is used to this day. Recent upgrades includes a satellite radio dish for communications.

Her last classification is Patrol Corvette. She was assigned to the Patrol Force of the Philippine Fleet, now known as the Offshore Combat Force until she was decommissioned from service on 29 January 2020. On July 1 2025 Dinagat Islands Governor Nilo P. Demerey Jr announce that BRP Rizal (PS-74) will become a museum ship and will be will be Dinagat Island’s first floating hotel and educational museum for tourists and learners. Gov. Demerey added that. “This warship will boost tourism and economic activities as this will be another tourist and educational attraction of the province.”

On July 1 2025 Dinagat Islands Governor Nilo P. Demerey Jr announce that BRP Rizal (PS-74) will become a museum ship and will be Dinagat Island’s first floating hotel and educational museum for tourists and learners. Gov. Demerey added that. “This warship will boost tourism and economic activities as this will be another tourist and educational attraction of the province.”

== Notable deployments ==
=== Naval exercises ===
The Rizal is included in the Philippine Navy's representatives at CARAT 2005, with BRP Emilio Jacinto (PS-35), BRP Bacolod City (LC-550), BRP Hilario Ruiz (PG-378), and BRP Timoteo Figoracion (PG-389).

Rizal was also part of the Philippine Navy contingent that joined Exercise SEAGULL 03–07, which was held in Brunei from September 2 to 10, 2007. With BRP Federico Martir (PG-385), and Royal Brunei Navy participating ships KDB Pejuang P03, KDB Seteria P04, KDB Perwira P14 and KDB Penyerang P16, they conducted series of drills, including Mine Clearance, Under Water Operations, Replenishment at Sea, Night Encounter Exercise, Boarding Exercise and Other Naval Tactical Exercises.

Rizal, Malaysian ships KD Ganas and KD Sri Perlis, and Philippine Navy ships BRP Nicolas Mahusay and BRP Bonny Serrano, participated in joint border patrol exercises from June to July 2008.

In July 2011, Rizal, BRP Pangasinan (PS-31) and US Navy ships USS Howard (DDG-83) and USS Chung-Hoon (DDG-93), took part in the sea phase bilateral exercises Cooperation Afloat Readiness and Training (CARAT) Philippines 2011.

=== Other incidents ===
Rizal was involved in a collision with a Chinese fishing boat off Scarborough Shoal on 23 May 1999. This incident sparked a diplomatic protest by the Chinese government since they are claiming that the PN ship collided with the fishing boat "on-purpose". The shoal is claimed by the Chinese government as part of its territory.

On 19 June 2009 Rizal took part in the rescue of Indonesian-registered tugboat MT Benoa with 10 people on board, and towed the distressed boat to San Fernando City pier.

On 18 October 2011 Rizal was involved in a minor accidental collision with a Chinese boat towing 25 smaller boats. The incident happened in the Recto Bank area, which is within the Philippine EEZ. The Chinese boat retreated and left behind the 25 sampans, which the Rizal towed back to Ulugan Bay in Palawan.

== Technical details ==
=== Armaments ===
As a minesweeper, the ship was armed with one forward Mk.26 3"/50-caliber dual-purpose gun, two single Bofors 40 mm guns, 1 Hedgehog depth charge projector, four depth charge projectiles (K-guns) and two depth charge tracks. Upon transfer to the Philippine Navy, her mine sweeping equipment were removed, and refitted her armaments. An additional Mk.26 3"/50-caliber dual-purpose gun was fitted aft, and her two single Bofors 40 mm guns were replaced by two twin Mk.1 Bofors 40 mm guns. She was also refitted with two twin Mk.24 Oerlikon 20 mm cannons and six 324mm Torpedo Tubes on two triple-mounts.

A small helicopter flight deck was later added, requiring the removal of the aft Mk.26 3"/50-caliber gun.

During its overhaul and refit between 1995 and 1996, the Philippine Navy removed her old anti-submarine weapons and systems, and made some changes in the armament set-up. Her flight deck was also removed. Final armaments fitted to the ship are two Mk.26 3"/50-caliber gun (one forward and one aft), two twin Mk.1 Bofors 40 mm cannons (aft), one twin Mk.24 Oerlikon 20 mm cannons (forward), and four M2 Browning 12.7 mm/50-caliber machine guns. This made the ship lighter and ideal for surface patrols, but losing her limited anti-submarine warfare capability.

=== Machinery ===
She underwent completed a rehabilitation overhaul in 1995, by Hatch & Kirk, wherein she was fitted with two remanufactured GM EMD 16V-645C diesel engines with a combined power of around 5,800 bhp (4,300 kW) driving two propellers. The main engines can propel the ship at a maximum speed of around 22 knots (41 km/h). It has a maximum range of 5,000 nautical miles (9,260 km) at a speed of 14 knots (26 km/h). The ship was also equipped with state-of-the-art safety equipment on deck and engine room with all digital control panels.

=== Electronics ===
Also during the refit the ship's Raytheon SPS-5C surface search radar and DAS-3 navigation radar was replaced by a Raytheon AN/SPS-64(V)11 surface search and navigation radar system. Later modifications included the installation of an additional Furuno navigation radar, long range and satellite communications systems, and GPS system standard to all Philippine Navy ships.

== Gallery ==
BRP Rizal (PS-74)

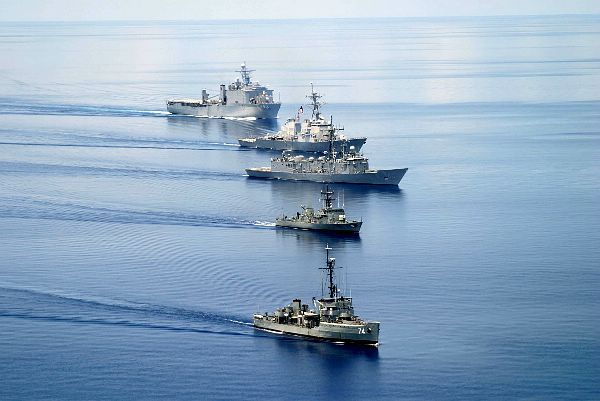
Representing the Philippine Navy with BRP Emilio Jacinto (PS-35)
at a CARAT exercise with US Navy.

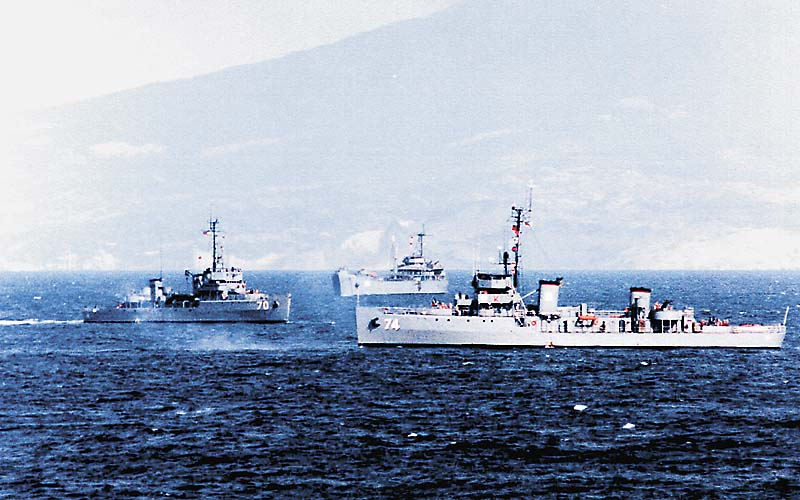
The 2 Rizal Class corvettes
at Balikatan 2000 exercises.

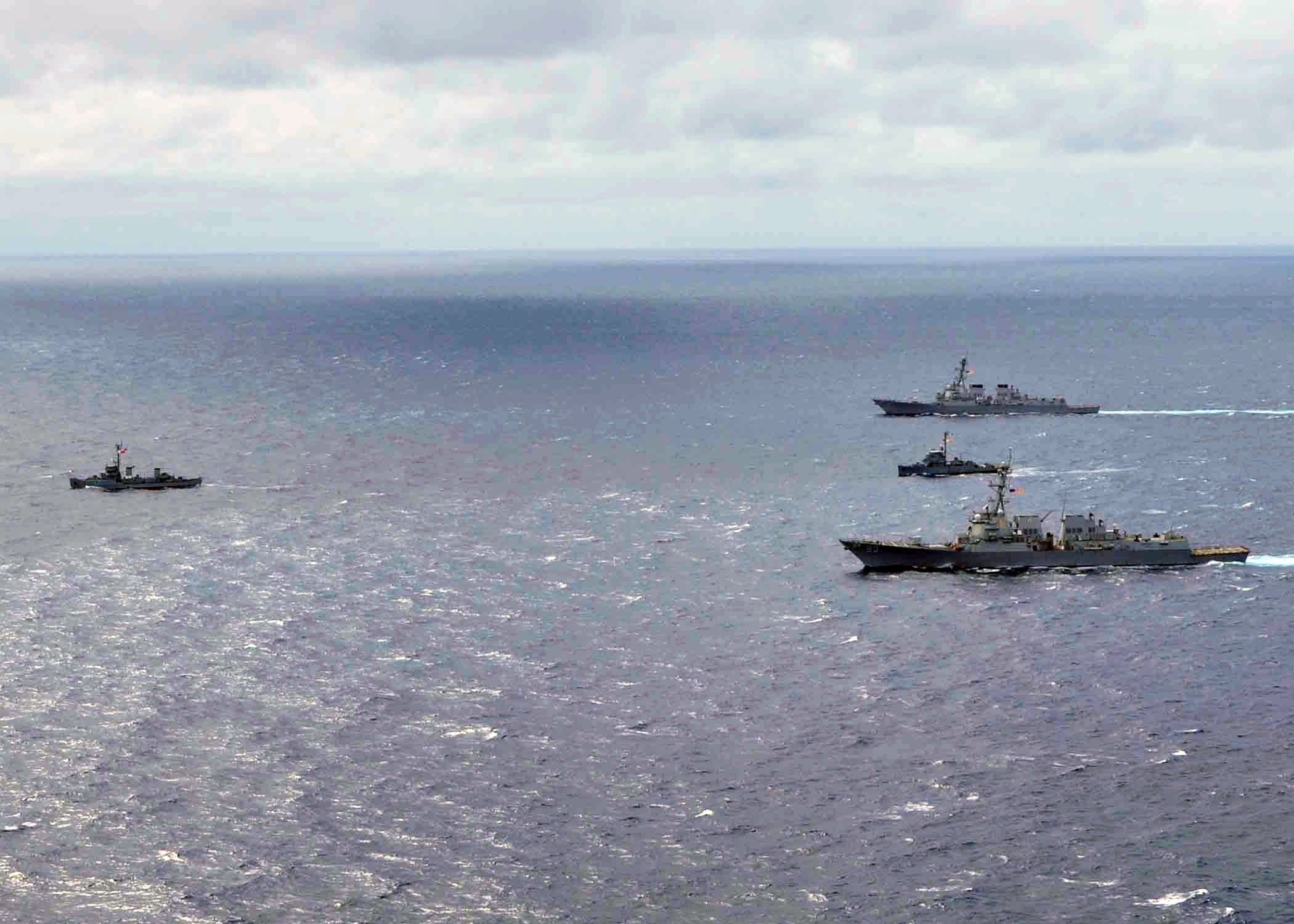
With BRP Pangasinan (PS-31),
USS Chung-Hoon (DDG-93),
and USS Howard (DDG-83) at CARAT Philippines 2011 exercise with US Navy.

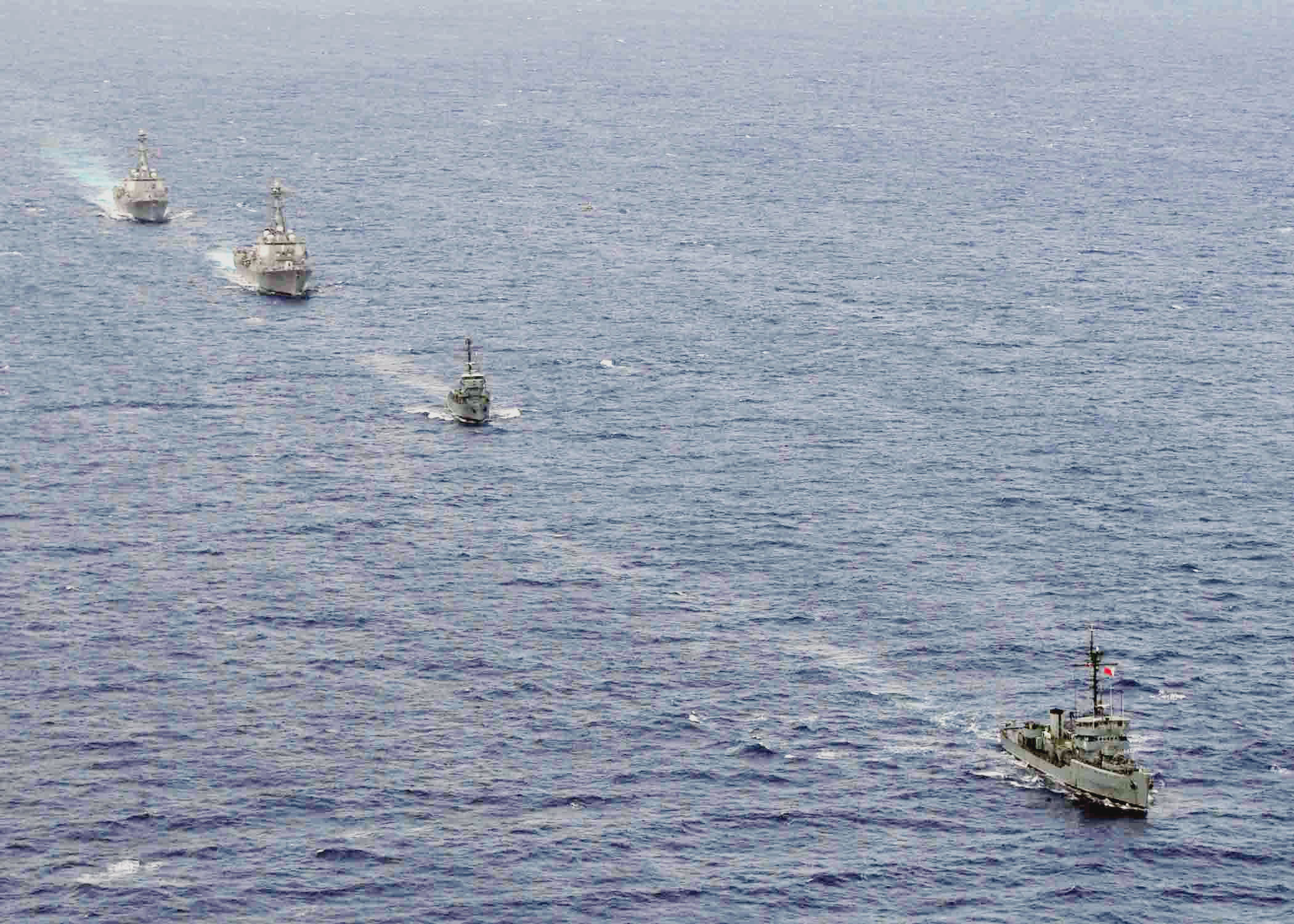
With BRP Pangasinan (PS-31),
USS Chung-Hoon (DDG-93),
and USS Howard (DDG-83) at CARAT Philippines 2011 exercise with US Navy.

== See also ==
- List of decommissioned ships of the Philippine Navy
