= USS Vigilance =

Minesweeper of the United States Navy

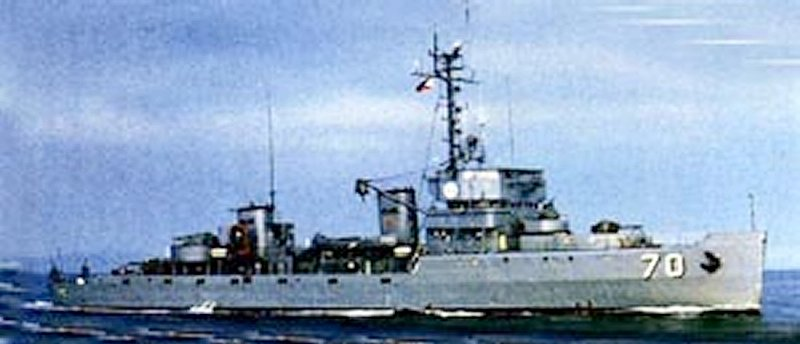
- During the ship's Philippine service as BRP Quezon

History

United States
- Name: USS Vigilance
- Ordered: As HMS Exploit (BAM-24)
- Builder: Associated Shipbuilders, Seattle, Washington
- Laid down: 28 November 1942
- Launched: 5 April 1943
- Commissioned: 28 February 1944
- Decommissioned: 30 January 1947
- Reclassified: MSF-324, 7 February 1955
- Stricken: 1 December 1966
- Honours and awards: 3 battle stars (World War II)
- Fate: Transferred to the Philippines, 19 August 1967

Philippines
- Name: BRP Quezon (PS-70)
- Namesake: Manuel L. Quezon
- Acquired: 19 August 1967
- Decommissioned: 1 March 2021
- Fate: Sunk in maritime strike exercise, 6 May 2026

General characteristics
- Class & type: Auk-class minesweeper
- Displacement: 890 long tons (904 t)
- Length: 221 ft 3 in (67.44 m)
- Beam: 32 ft (9.8 m)
- Draft: 10 ft 9 in (3.28 m)
- Speed: 18 knots (33 km/h; 21 mph)
- Complement: 100 officers and enlisted
- Armament: 1 × 3"/50 caliber gun; 2 × 40 mm guns; 2 × 20 mm guns; 2 × Depth charge tracks

USS Vigilance (AM-324) was an Auk-class minesweeper acquired by the United States Navy for the dangerous task of removing mines from minefields laid in the water to prevent ships from passing.

Vigilance was originally laid down for the Royal Navy under the lend-lease program as HMS Exploit (BAM-24) on 28 November 1942 at Seattle, Washington, by Associated Shipbuilders. However, the United States Navy decided to keep the ship and renamed her USS Vigilance (AM-324) on 23 January 1943. Launched on 5 April 1943, the minesweeper was commissioned at her builder's yard on 28 February 1944.

After fitting-out, radio direction finder calibration, sea trials, and minesweeping indoctrination, Vigilance departed Seattle, Washington on 21 March, bound for southern California for type training, shakedown, and training in anti-submarine warfare (ASW) tactics.

== World War II Pacific operations ==
Escorting PCS-1396 and PCS-1W, the new minesweeper departed San Diego, California on 4 May, bound for Hawaii. Upon her arrival at Pearl Harbor on 11 May, Vigilance delivered 111 bags of mail to the Fleet Post Office and, three days later, got underway with Triumph (AM-323) for the Marshall Islands. The two minesweepers screened William Ward Burrows (AP-6), Fortune (IX-146), and Boreas (AF-8) to Majuro which they reached on 25 May.

Vigilance departed Majuro at 0800 on the 26th to return to Hawaii, intercepted Megrez (AK-126) en route, and relieved PC-548 of escorting that cargo ship for the remainder of the voyage to Oahu. After arriving at Pearl Harbor on 2 June, Vigilance underwent upkeep and maintenance before moving to Brown's Camp, Oahu, for experimental minesweeping evolutions which she conducted into mid-June.

On 14 June, Vigilance weighed anchor as part of the screen for convoy 4313-A, a group of three Navy cargo ships, three civilian merchantmen, and refrigerator ship Arctic (AF-7). Crouter (DE-11) and Pursuit (AM-108) joined Vigilance in escorting the convoy to Eniwetok where they arrived on 25 June.

During the second of two more round-trip runs from Pearl Harbor to the Marshalls, Vigilance suffered an engine casualty - a damaged exhaust manifold - that was beyond the capacity of the ship's force to handle. Accordingly, she went alongside Zeus (ARB-4) at Eniwetok on 24 September for repairs.

=== Return to Hawaii for repairs ===
Making port back at Pearl Harbor on 5 October, the ship underwent more repairs and maintenance work and tested minesweeping gear off Brown's Camp. After getting underway for the Marshalls again on 23 October, escorting Ocelot (IX-110), Vigilance twice picked up "doubtful" submarine contacts — on 24 and 28 October — and fired hedgehog patterns on both occasions. She made port at Eniwetok on 3 November but got underway for Guam two days later, escorting a convoy consisting of SS Fred Lykes, SS Cape Bon, SS Cape Kildare, SS Rockland Victory, and USAT General M. M. Patrick.

The minesweeper subsequently performed local escort duty between Guam, Peleliu, and Ulithi, arriving at the latter on 14 November. She patrolled the approaches to Mugai channel, Ulithi, from the 17th through the 19th.

=== Attack on Japanese submarine ===
Five minutes before sunrise on 20 November, while on patrol station number 4, Vigilance sighted a small wake 700 yards (640 m) broad on the starboard quarter. Southbound on her patrol, the minesweeper had swung wide to avoid fouling the screen of an outward-bound task group of three destroyers, a cruiser, and other vessels when she made the sighting. She then put over full right rudder and accelerated to full speed as her crew went to battle stations. With depth charges set on "shallow" the minecraft bent on speed to make an attack but, much to her chagrin, found that the wake had completely disappeared. In the midst of all the hulls and wakes created by the Saipan-bound task group, picking up the contact proved impossible.

Vigilance signaled the location of the wake to Cummings (DD-365). Moments later, the cruiser in the convoy signaled that she sighted a periscope on her starboard quarter. Case (DD-370) arrived on the scene first and disposed of what proved to be a midget submarine by ramming and depth charges.

=== Incident with American TBF aircraft ===
After that incident, Vigilance, aided by a pair of American Grumman TBF Avengers from VMTB-232, remained on patrol off the channel entrance. At 0031 on 21 November, another Avenger approached low from astern. Men in Vigilance thought that the aircraft might have been a new arrival, unfamiliar with their ship. The aircraft suddenly made a sharp bank and a wing-tip caught in the water and the plane cartwheeled into the sea about a half mile from Vigilance. The plane was immediately enveloped in flame; and, shortly thereafter, the aircraft's depth charges exploded.

To compound the confusion, a second Avenger arrived and, thinking the wreckage on the water was a surfaced submarine, strafed it. Vigilance launched her motor whaleboat at 0051 and picked up a survivor who had remained alive despite the crash, explosion, and machine-gun fire. Vigilance continued the search for other survivors but found none. At 0524, the minesweeper was ordered to transfer the wounded man to hospital facilities ashore.

=== Patrol and escort duties ===
Aside from an occasional day or so of maintenance and upkeep, Vigilance patrolled off Ulithi's Mugai channel for the remainder of the year.

Following an escort mission to the Palaus from 5 to 11 January 1945, Vigilance returned to Ulithi on the 12th, only to find a full-scale antisubmarine alert in progress. She commenced patrolling station number 7 in company with PC-1179 before receiving orders to patrol off the Zowariyau and Piiriperiperi channels. Shifting to a retiring search in company with Impeccable (AM-320) soon thereafter, Vigilance was relieved of this duty by Spangler (DE-696) and returned to Ulithi.

After local patrol operations off the Mugai channel, Vigilance performed local escort missions between Ulithi and Kossol Roads and from Kossol Roads to Seeadler Harbor, at Manus, in the Admiralties. For the latter part of February, the minesweeper served as submarine listening watch and harbor entrance patrol vessel at Kossol before she returned to Ulithi.

From 6 to 8 March, Vigilance lay alongside Terror (CM-5) undergoing availability in preparation for the upcoming operation against the Ryūkyūs. Vigilance got underway for Nansei Shoto on 19 March and steamed in cruising formation with Mine Division (MinDiv) 11, on the starboard quarter of USS Terror.

Arriving in area V-l, about 35 miles (56 km) southwest of Okinawa, on 24 March, Vigilance and her sister minesweepers swept for moored mines until nightfall when they retired. She cut loose one moored mine on the 26th, three on the 27th, and one on the 28th. While performing these sweep operations, she served as MinRon 4 "destruction vessel", slated to destroy loose mines once they reached the surface. The ship sank several drifting floats and one moored mine with gunfire.

=== Attack on Vigilance by Japanese Vals and a Kate ===
On the morning of the 28th, Vigilance's lookouts spotted a Japanese "Kate" torpedo bomber and two "Val" dive-bombers attacking; and her gunners — along with those of the other ships in the unit — opened fire and blasted the "Kate" into pieces. The ship thus chalked up her first "sure assist" in downing the plane.

The landings commenced on 1 April. During the first three days of the invasion, Vigilance screened the unloading transports off Hagushi beach. Then, after shifting to Kerama Retto for two days of logistics on 4 and 5 April, the minesweeper alternated between sweeping and screening operations for the ensuing week.

=== Vigilance comes to the aid of a DE under attack ===
While Vigilance was patrolling five miles (8 km) south of Kerama Retto on the afternoon of the 12th, a "flash red" alert was announced, and the ship's lookouts soon noted the presence of many enemy planes — all out of gun range. Suddenly, at 1456, the minesweeper noted black smoke pouring from Whitehurst (DE-634), a destroyer escort that had just been hit by a kamikaze while patrolling an adjacent sector. Vigilance altered course to close, accelerating to full speed as fire and rescue parties readied emergency fire-fighting and first aid equipment.

Meanwhile, Whitehurst circled, apparently out of control. Yet, when Vigilance caught up with the damaged ship and came alongside at 1530, the more serious fires on board the escort vessel had been controlled. Vigilance's fire fighting and damage control parties helped to extinguish the remaining blaze and made emergency repairs.

However, the minecraft's prompt and efficient rendering of first aid was an even greater contribution. By 1535, 23 of the most seriously injured men from the escort's ship's company — and one dead man — had been transferred to Vigilance and taken to the minesweeper's mess hall for treatment. The ship's doctor, several officers, and enlisted men administered blood plasma and dressed wounds. The immediate injection of plasma and the efficient handling of the wounded saved 21 of the 23 casualties brought on board the minesweeper.

After placing Signalman 2nd Class Thomas G. Barnes on board Whitehurst for temporary duty to handle the escort ship's communications - the destroyer escort's bridge force had been wiped out by the kamikaze - Vigilance proceeded to Gosper (APA-170) and transferred the wounded to that attack transport. At 1854, Vigilance resumed her screening station off Kerama Retto.

=== Vigilance shoots down a Val ===
Vigilance remained on patrol off those islands over the ensuing days — days which seemed comparatively quiet. However, on the morning of the 16th, alert lookouts sighted two planes — a "Val" and a "Frances" — off the ship's port quarter. Lt. (jg.) N. B. Norman, the officer of the deck, immediately ordered the gun watches on the 20-millimeter and 40-millimeter guns to commence firing, there not being time to call the ship to general quarters. Vigilance's 20-millimeter guns commenced firing on the "Val" when it was slightly abaft the beam, and the enemy plane then turned toward the ship before reversing course and heading for Wilson (DD-408). Eventually, the 20-millimeter fire from Vigilance scored; and the "Val" splashed some 300 yards (270 m) ahead of the destroyer.

=== Vigilance comes to the aid of an oiler under air attack ===
Meanwhile, the minesweeper's starboard 40-millimeter mount took the "Frances" under fire. At a point 1,000 feet (300 m) above and 100 yards (91 m) from the port quarter of the nearby Taluga (AO-62), the "Frances" executed a wing-over and dived for the oiler. Vigilance's Bofors continued firing until the plane was just above Taluga, at which point she ceased firing for fear of hitting the oiler. The "Frances" crashed Taluga's bow, administering a glancing blow to the ship and blew some of the oiler's crew overboard. Vigilance fished three Taluga sailors from the water, who all agreed with the minesweeper's observers that the ship's gunnery had proved accurate and effective in deflecting the suicide plane.

=== Vigilance strafed by Japanese Betty, shoots down a Jake ===
For the remainder of April and the first few days of May, Vigilance screened the landing operations. On two more occasions - on 18 April and on the 28th — Vigilance took passing Japanese planes under fire. In the first instance, she claimed to have shot down a "Jill" — one of four planes that closed the ship at night. Another of the four planes — believed to be a "Betty" bomber — strafed the ship but caused no damage. In the second case, the minesweeper shot down a snooping "Jake" floatplane at 0130 on the 28th.

The minecraft's patrol duties in May were highlighted by two incidents. The first occurred on 4 May and the second on the 9th. In the first case, the ship was patrolling five miles (8 km) south of Kerama Retto about sunset. Five miles to the north, five Japanese suicide planes headed for Sangamon (CVE-26). Combat air patrol (CAP) F4U Corsair fighters downed four, but the fifth crashed into the escort carrier at 1933. A burst of flame shot into the darkening skies; and soon the ship became a blazing inferno, ammunition and gasoline exploding at intervals and sending sheets of flame into the air to a height of what looked like hundreds of feet.

=== Vigilance comes to aid of Sangamon ===
Screening ships and other vessels in the vicinity went to Sangamon's assistance. After obtaining permission from her sector commander to do so, Vigilance departed her patrol area at 2035 and closed Sangamon to lend a hand. Vigilance located three swimming sailors blown overboard from the CVE and directed a nearby LCV(P) to pick them up and transfer them to a high-speed transport. By midnight, Sangamon's fires were under control, and she was towed to an anchorage in Kerama Retto. At 0335 on the 5th, Vigilance formed up with Forrest (DMS-24), Stern (DE-187), and Ringness (APD-100) to conduct a combined search for survivors. At 1045, the search was abandoned, and Vigilance returned to her patrol station off Kerama Retto.

From 6 May to 8 May, Vigilance underwent an availability at the fleet anchorage at Kerama Retto before returning to the screening line. The next day, while steaming on station Baker 10, four miles (6 km) west of Kerama Retto, Vigilance manned her battle stations at 1845 when she received a "flash blue" air raid alert warning. Soon thereafter, the ship sighted a "Val" at 2,500 feet (760 m), three miles (5 km) north. Vigilance opened fire with her 3-inch (76 mm) and 40-millimeter battery as the dive-bomber plunged toward the nearby England (DE-635).

=== Vigilance comes to aid of USS England ===
England, on station Baker 11 — three miles northeast of the minecraft, had attained fame throughout the fleet in the spring of 1944 by sinking six Japanese I-boats and earning a Presidential Unit Citation. Upon sighting the suicider, the destroyer escort started a hard right turn to present her beam to the attacker while her 3-inch (76 mm) antiaircraft battery pounded away. Vigilance, too, contributed to the flak above the twisting destroyer escort; gunfire from the ships blew off one wing of the suicider but failed to deflect the kamikaze from its one-way mission. The plane crashed into England's starboard side, at the main deck below the bridge. A heavy explosion soon followed, and a burst of smoke and flame engulfed the destroyer escort's pilothouse and bridge.

Vigilance rang up full ahead and went to England's assistance. While the minecraft was en route to the destroyer escort's side, another air battle ensued overhead. Two Corsairs shot down a "Val" which had possibly been attracted to the area by the burning England. As Vigilance attempted to overtake the stricken escort ship, her crew broke out fire and rescue equipment on the main deck and made the mess hall ready to receive wounded below. Still en route, sharp-eyed lookouts noted survivors in England's wake, and the minecraft accordingly directed YMS-93 to pick up the swimmers. Gherardi (DMS-30) also closed the area to assist.

England, meanwhile, finally was brought under control and stopped about four miles (6 km) east of where she had been hit by the kamikaze. At 1920, Vigilance pulled alongside the burning destroyer escort to find heavy fires blazing from the forward mess hall, up through the wardroom, forward 20-millimeter clipping room, radio room, pilothouse and flying bridge. A bomb, carried by the "Val" that had crashed the ship, had exploded in the mess hall. It wiped out the entire forward fire and rescue party, blew out the port side of the officers' quarters, opened the main deck, and tumbled a 3-inch (76 mm) gun over the side. A 3-inch (76 mm), ready-service ammunition box had fallen into the burning mess hall, and ammunition was exploding.

Vigilance's fire and rescue party dragged on board five fire hoses, two submersible pumps, one handy billy pump, and a rescue breathing apparatus. Ruptured forward water mains on board England had prevented the flooding of the forward magazines, so three hoses from Vigilance and one found on England's deck were trained down into the 3-inch (76 mm) ready box, stopping the detonation of the ammunition. After 30 minutes of hard work, the forward 3-inch (76 mm) magazine was reported to be half flooded, while the fires in the pilothouse, radio room, and on the flying bridge were extinguished.

Because of the condition of England's crew — many were shocked and dazed — the men from Vigilance had to fight the fires largely themselves. Nine seriously injured England sailors, placed on stretchers, were transferred to the minesweeper where they were given first aid and blood plasma. LSM-222 and PCE(R)-853 lay alongside at 2015, sending two medical officers and three pharmacist's mates with additional medical supplies to handle the influx of casualties.

After two hours had elapsed - a time when the frequent appearance of Japanese aircraft prohibited the use of lights and made the handling of lines, hoses, and damage control equipment difficult - Vigilance finally succeeded in extinguishing USS England's fires and took the destroyer escort under tow. Underway for the northern entrance of Kerama Retto at 2135, the two ships arrived at their destination two hours later. There, at the harbor entrance, Gear (ARS-34) took England under tow and pulled her inside the anchorage. At that time, the harbor was blanketed with smoke as enemy aircraft were again in the vicinity. Vigilance crept alongside Gosper (APA-170) at 0110 on 10 May and transferred USS England's casualties to the transport. Gherardi (DD-637) and YMS-93 soon arrived and transferred 25 more survivors to the transport.

=== Returning to minesweep and escort duties ===
Vigilance remained at anchor for the remainder of the day, replenishing medical supplies and damage control gear, before getting underway on the 11th to sweep for mines in the vicinity of Tori Shima, in company with MinDiv 11. Upon completing the sweep at 1400 that afternoon, Vigilance resumed her screening operations from 12 to 16 May.

The ship received fresh provisions on the 17th at anchor at Kerama Retto and returned to the screening line the next day. On 19 May, Vigilance got underway for the Marianas as part of convoy OKA-4 and arrived at Saipan on the 24th. She shifted to Guam in company with Gladiator (AM-319) on the 25th and commenced two weeks of availability at the minecraft docks, Apra Harbor, Guam.

Upon the conclusion of the repairs, the minesweeper conducted ASW training exercises with Trepang (SS-412) early on 12 June before departing Guam at 1755 to escort SS Fairland to Guam. Arriving at Tanapag Harbor the next day, she returned to Kerama Retto on 16 June in company with Greene (APD-36), Opponent (AM-269), and SS Fairland and SS Cape Victory.

Vigilance operated in the Ryūkyūs through the end of June and began July preparing for her next major operation, the sweeping of the East China Sea.

The minesweeper got underway on 4 July for area "Juneau", as part of Task Unit 39.11.4. Between 5 and 14 July, the ship accounted for four mines before undergoing logistics at Buckner Bay, Okinawa, from 16 to 17 July. A typhoon forced a general fleet movement to sea over the next four days, and Vigilance did not return until the 21st. Underway again for area "Juneau" on the 22nd, the minesweeper and her sister ships spent the next week sweeping in the East China Sea. Vigilance contributed to the effort by locating and destroying three mines.

=== End-of-war operations ===
For the first five days in August, Vigilance remained at anchor at Buckner Bay. She got underway at 0558 on 6 August and escorted Convoy OKI-10 to San Pedro Bay, Leyte, Philippine Islands, arriving on 9 August. She moored alongside Briareus (AR-12) on the 10th for availability and, while her crew was enjoying movies on the forecastle that evening, she received the word that Japan was ready to surrender — news greeted with great rejoicing by all hands.

Vigilance remained alongside USS Briareus for 17 days before returning to Okinawa at the end of August. By that time, the war in the Pacific was over. She remained at Buckner Bay from 1 to 7 September and got underway at noon on the 8th, bound for Wakayama, Japan, to support the occupation of the erstwhile enemy's home islands. At 0430 on the 11th, Vigilance arrived at the southern entrance to Kii Suido and soon formed up in echelon formation to commence sweeping a channel — to a 120-foot (37 m) depth — through Kii Suido to Wakayama. That evening she anchored at Wakayama Ko but resumed her labors early the following day and continued the routine for the next few days. She swept one mine on the 15th.

== Damaged in a typhoon ==
Worsening weather gave all signs of an approaching typhoon; and Vigilance was forced to anchor in various berths at Wakanoura Wan, off Honshū, between the 16th and 19th. As the storm reached its climax before dawn on the 18th, LST-661 dragged her anchors and drifted down toward Vigilance's berth. The minesweeper slipped her anchor and chain in an effort to avoid a collision; but the 90-knot (170 km/h) wind pushed the LST inexorably toward the minecraft. Soon there came the crunch of steel on steel as the landing ship crashed into the minesweeper's starboard side, forward, bending in the bulwarks near the bow.

== Post-war assignments ==
Eventually, Vigilance got underway and maneuvered inside the confused harbor before finally dropping anchor for the night to ride out the storm as it blew itself out. The dawn revealed three LST's aground and a YMS on her side on the rocks. After recovering her anchor and chain, Vigilance resumed minesweeping operations in the Japanese home waters. She swept off Honshū for the remainder of the month of September, anchoring upon occasion at Wakanoura Wan, and chalked up 16 more mines swept. Accompanying LCI's or PGM's sank by gunfire those mines which the sweeper cut loose. On the 24th, Vigilance herself destroyed a mine with 20-millimeter and .30-caliber rifle fire.

After engineering repairs alongside Patoka (AG-125) in early October, Vigilance returned to the waters off Honshū to resume sweep operations, executing magnetic mine sweeps off Bishago Se and Iseno Umi. She returned to Tsu Ko to anchor on 12 October and there embarked passengers and loaded mail for transfer to Wakanoura Wan. After provisioning and fueling small craft to capacity, the minesweeper departed Tsu Ko at 1155 on 13 October and arrived at Wakanoura Wan early the following morning. Following another availability alongside Patoka, Vigilance tested her magnetic sweep gear before she returned to Bishago Se and Iseno Umi to resume sweep operations there.

Vigilance operated as pilot boat at the Yokkaichi anchorage, anchoring nightly in the Matoya Ko, rendezvousing with vessels off the harbor and leading them through the minefields to port. On 28 October, she shifted back to Wakanoura and remained there until noon of the following day for repairs to her radar. Reassigned duties as pilot ship soon thereafter, Vigilance returned to Iseno Umi and Matoya Ko on 31 October.

== Returning to U.S. waters ==
During the operations off Nagoya, Vigilance had cleared the way for the evacuation of prisoners of war and the landing of American occupation forces. After performing similar operations in the Nagoya area through November, Vigilance departed Japanese waters on 17 December 1945, via Eniwetok and Pearl Harbor, bound for the United States. She operated locally out of San Francisco between January and November 1946 and alternated between San Diego and San Francisco into January 1947.

== Decommissioning ==
Decommissioned on 30 January 1947, the ship was placed in reserve on 16 April that same year. She remained inactive into the mid-1960s. During that period, she was reclassified as a fleet minesweeper, MSF-324, on 7 February 1955. Struck from the Navy List on 1 December 1966, the ship was transferred to the Government of the Philippines on 19 August 1967. Renamed Quezon — in honor of the first President of the Philippine Commonwealth, Manuel Quezon — and classified as PS-70, the erstwhile minesweeper served on with the Philippine Navy as the Rizal class offshore patrol vessel into 2020. On March 1, 2021, this ship was decommissioned.

== Final fate ==
On 6 May 2026, the ship was sunk by a Japanese antiship missile as part of the annual Balikatan naval exercises involving Japanese, American, Philippine, and Canadian forces. This marked the first time Japan had fired such a missile outside its own territory.

== Awards ==
Vigilance was awarded three battle stars for her World War II service. She also had the honor of being recommended for a Navy Unit Commendation, and her commanding officer, Lt. Jackson L. Morton, USNR, was awarded a Silver Star for his courage and level-headed action under fire.
