= BRP Dagupan City =

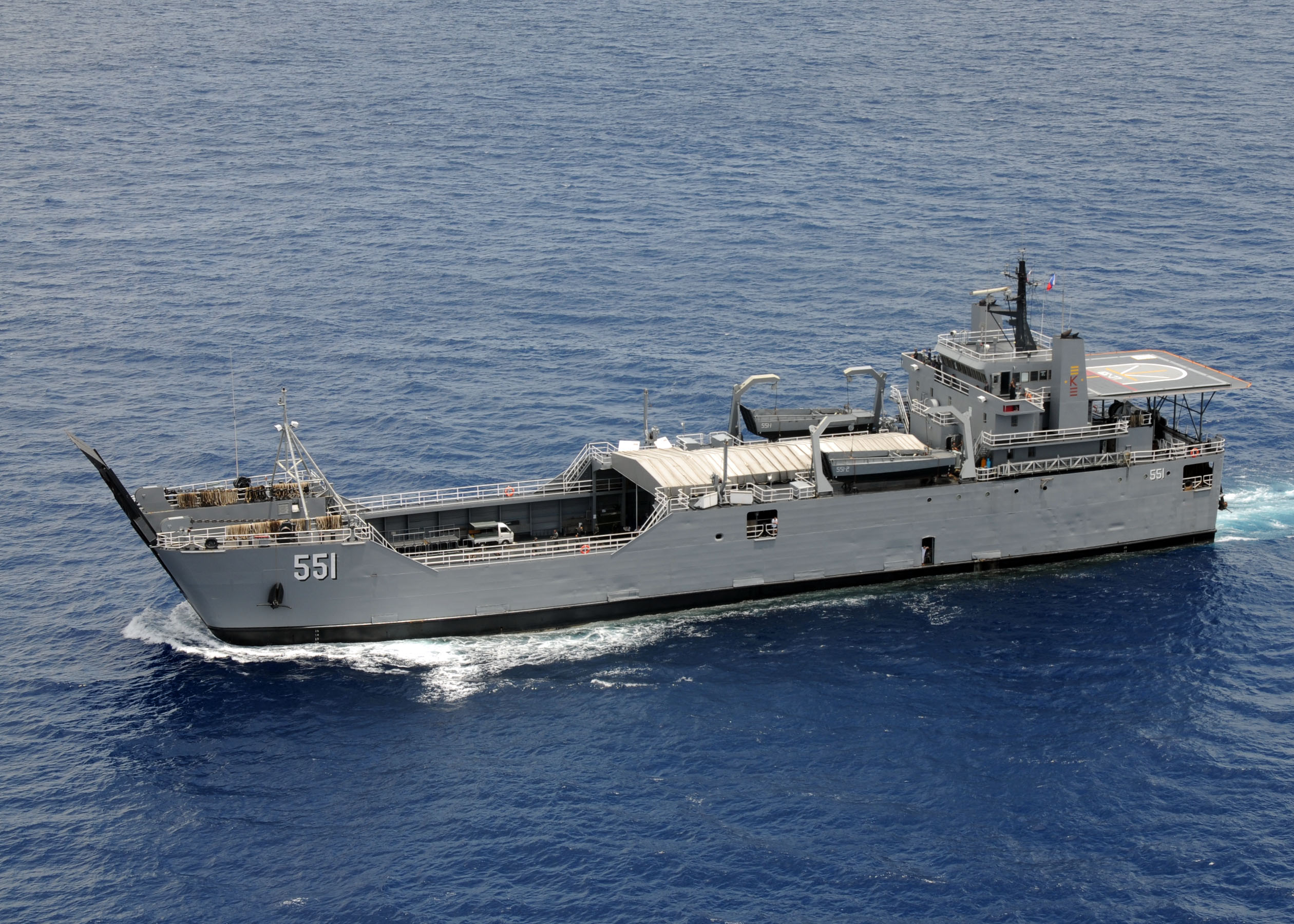
- BRP Dagupan City (LS-551)

History

Philippines
- Name: Dagupan City
- Namesake: Dagupan is an independent component city of the province of Pangasinan.
- Operator: Philippine Navy
- Builder: Halter/Moss Point Marine, Escatawpa, MS.
- Commissioned: 5 April 1994
- Renamed: BRP Dagupan City (LC-551) - up to April 2016; BRP Dagupan City (LS-551) - from April 2016
- Status: in active service

General characteristics
- Class & type: Bacolod City-class logistics support vessel
- Displacement: 4,265 tons (Full Load)
- Length: 273 ft (83 m)
- Beam: 60 ft (18 m) (folded)
- Draft: 12 ft (3.7 m)
- Installed power: 5,800 hp (4,300 kW)
- Propulsion: 2 × GM EMD 16V-645E6 diesel engines
- Speed: 12 knots (22 km/h; 14 mph) (maximum), 10 knots (sustained)
- Range: 8,300 nmi (15,400 km; 9,600 mi) at 10 knots (19 km/h; 12 mph)
- Boats & landing craft carried: 2 × LCVPs on davits
- Capacity: 2,280 tons (900 tons for amphibious operations) of vehicles, containers or cargo, plus 150 troops
- Complement: (30) 6 - Officers/ 24 - Enlisted Personnel
- Sensors & processing systems: Raytheon SPS-64(V)2 I-band Navigation Radar
- Electronic warfare & decoys: Ship armament=*2 × 20 mm Oerlikon Mk10 cannons; 2 × 7.62 mm general purpose machine guns
- Aviation facilities: Helipad at aft deck

BRP Dagupan City (LS-551) is the second and last ship of two Bacolod City-class logistics support vessel, and is based on a helicopter capable variant of the US Army Frank S. Besson class. She is also considered one of the most modern transport ships in the Philippine Navy, having been commissioned during the early 1990s. She was previously known as BRP Dagupan City (LC-551) prior to a classification change implemented by the Philippine Navy starting April 2016

== History ==
BRP Dagupan City was built by Halter/Moss Point Marine of Escatawpa, Mississippi in the United States and was commissioned into Philippine Navy in 1994. Both ships of its class were purchased brand-new by the Philippine government through the FMS program of the United States. Since its commissioning, both ships of its class were rigorously used in military and peacetime operations, and has been joining joint military exercises with foreign navies as well.

Presently it is assigned with the Service Force of the Philippine Fleet.

== Renaming Issues ==
Originally named as the BRP Cagayan de Oro City, she was commissioned with the Philippine Navy as BRP Dagupan City. Recent photos show the words "BRP Cagayan de Oro City" still embossed at the rear end of the ship's steel surface. Details of the renaming were not made public.

== Technical details ==
The ship is powered by two General Motors-EMD 16-645EZ6 diesel engines with a combined power of around 5,800 hp driving two propellers. The main engines can propel the 1,400 ton (4,265 tons full load) ship at a maximum speed of around 12 knots (22 km/h). At a sustained speed of 10 knots (19 km/h), it range is at around 8,300 nautical miles (15,370 km).

As an amphibious transport, it is fairly armed for defensive purposes, and carries four 7.62mm general purpose machine guns at the front side decks, and two Oerlikon 20 mm cannons near its two LCVPs.

The prime mission of the ship is the direct transport and discharge of liquid and dry cargo to shallow terminal areas, remote under-developed coastlines and on inland waterways.

The ship does not require external cranes or port facilities, and even in only four feet of water under full load, the ship is still able to land. This capability expands the choice of landing locations, and at the same time reduces the potential enemy impact on the logistics support operations.

The ships have a capacity to transport up to 48 TEU or 2,280 tons vehicles/general cargo, or up to 900 tons on Logistics Over The Shore (LOTS) / amphibious operations. Its ramps and the main deck are able to withstand roll-on/roll-off operations of even heavy main battle tanks.

== Notable operations ==
=== Exercises ===
The Dagupan City, together with BRP Leopoldo Regis, BRP Rajah Humabon, BRP Artemio Ricarte, USS Essex, and USS Tortuga were part of the naval component of the US-RP Balikatan 2009 (BK09) bi-lateral exercises held in April 2009.

Again Dagupan City, together with BRP Rajah Humabon, BRP Apolinario Mabini, USS Essex, and USS Denver were part of the naval phase of the US-RP Balikatan 2010 (BK10) bi-lateral exercises held in March 2010.

=== Deployments ===
BRP Dagupan City together with BRP Quezon (PS-70) were sent to Singapore and Malaysia from November to December 2009 for an overseas training cruise for students from the Naval Education and Training Command and the Fleet Training Center, and as part of the Philippine contingent at Langkawi International Maritime and Aerospace Exhibition (LIMA) in Malaysia.

== Gallery ==
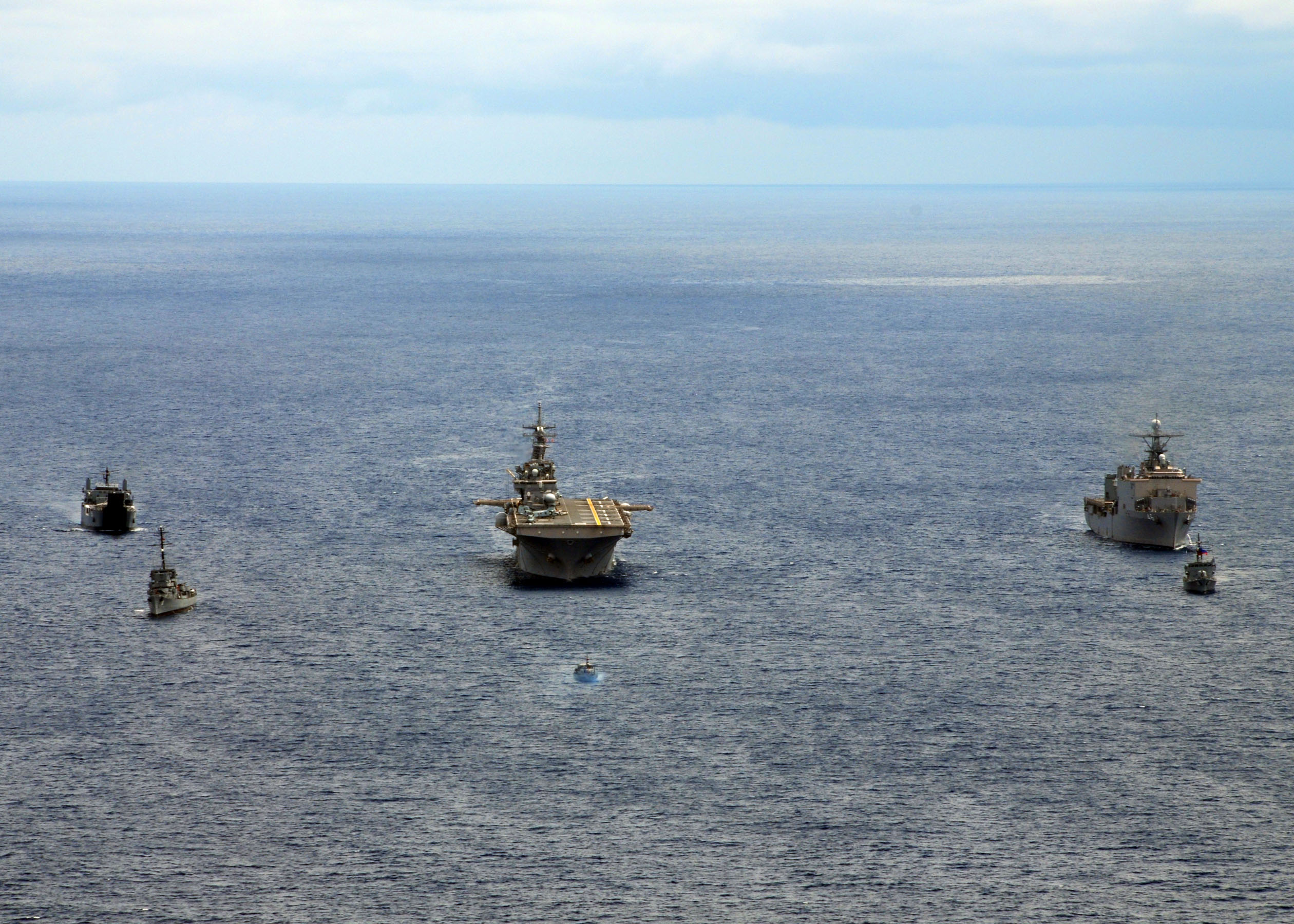
BRP Dagupan City together with other Philippine and U.S. Navy ships during Balikatan 2009 held in April 2009.

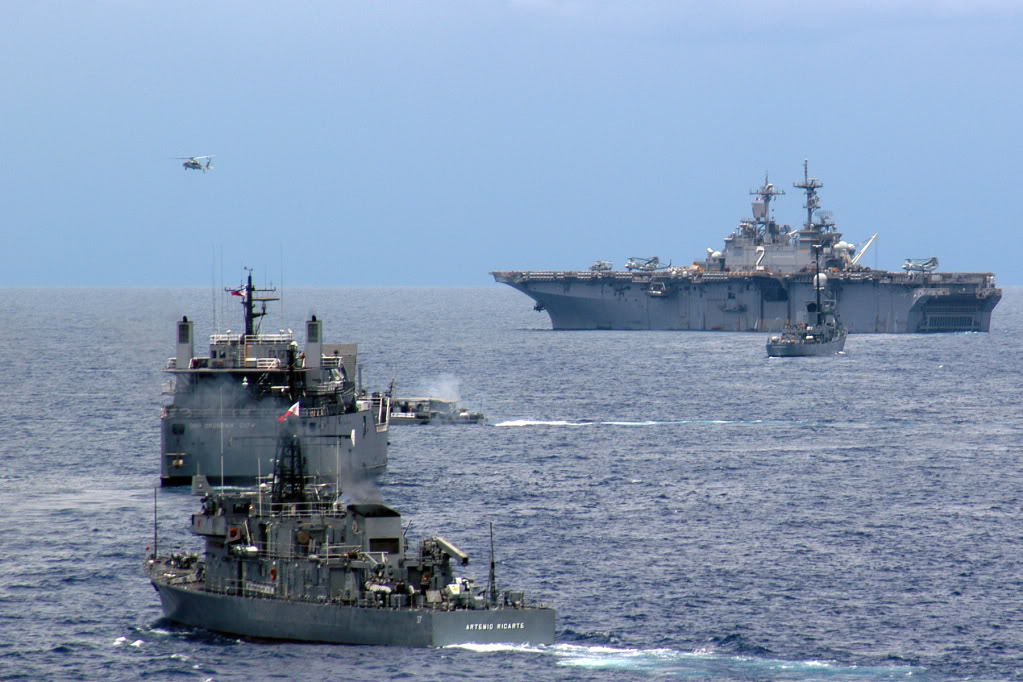
The forward-deployed amphibious assault ship USS Essex leads ships formation during photo exercise (PHOTOEX) with Philippines Navy ships during Balikatan 2009 (BK09).

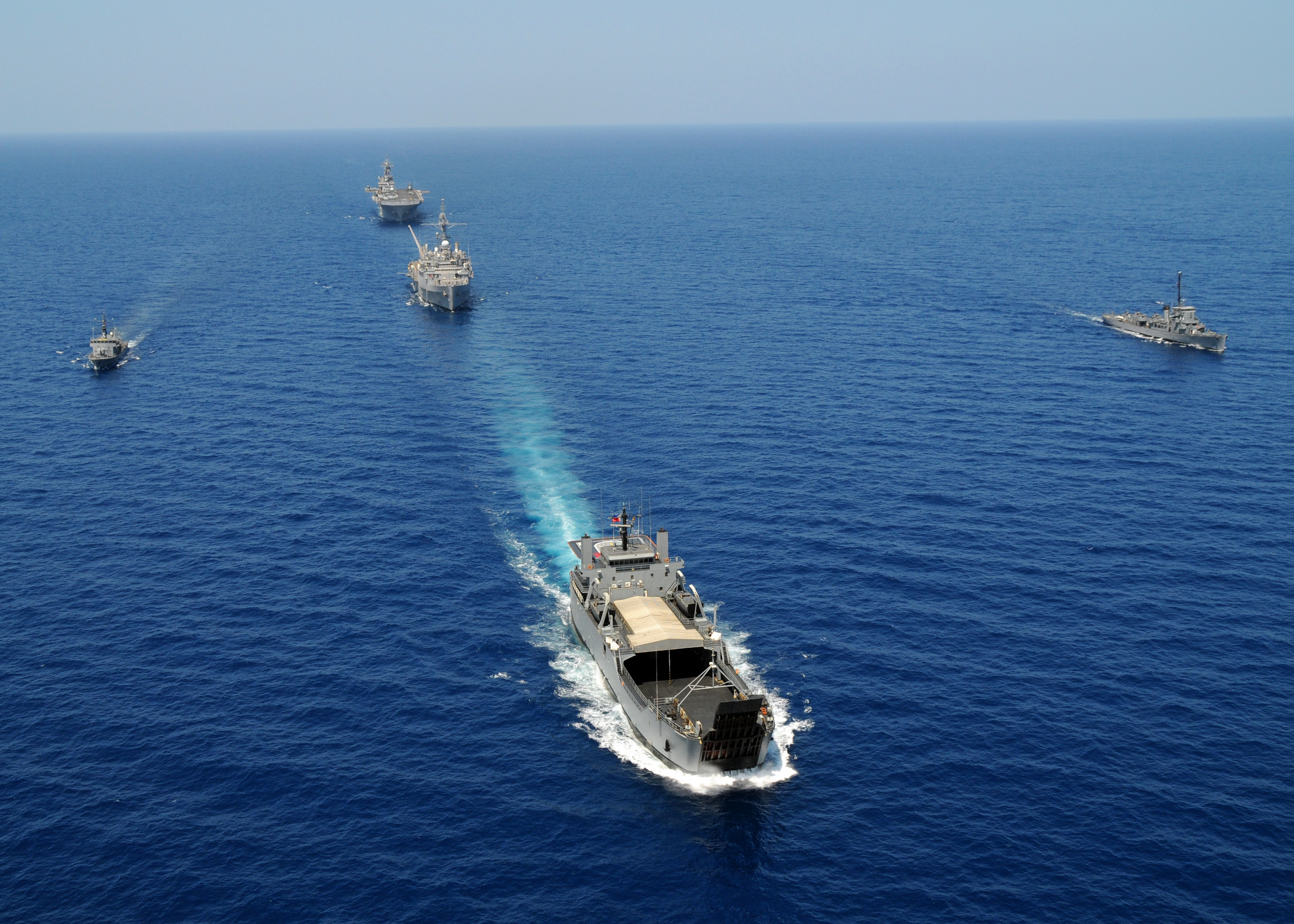
BRP Dagupan City lead formation of Philippine and US Navy ships during Balikatan 2010 exercises (BK10).

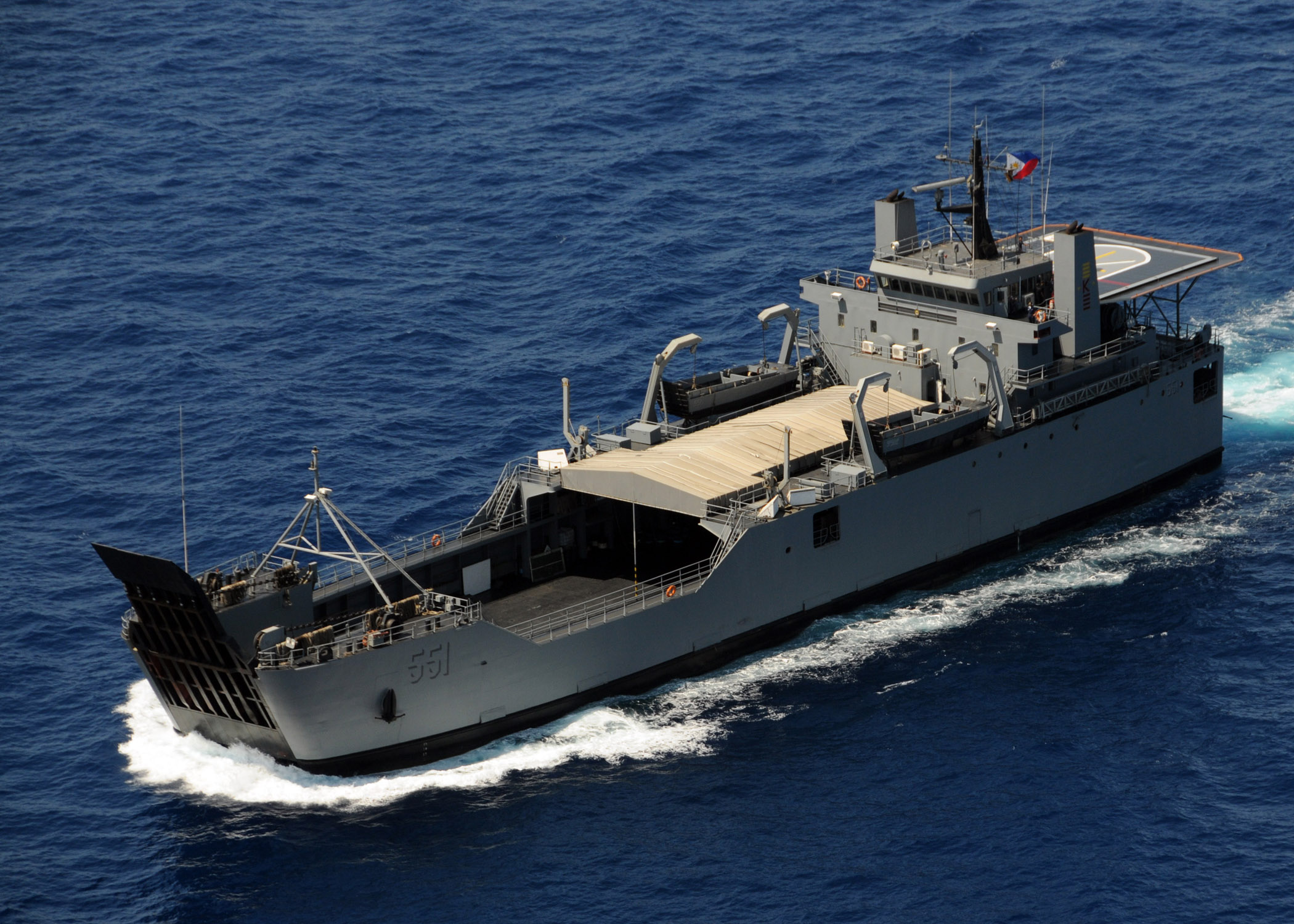
BRP Dagupan City during Balikatan 2010 exercises (BK10).

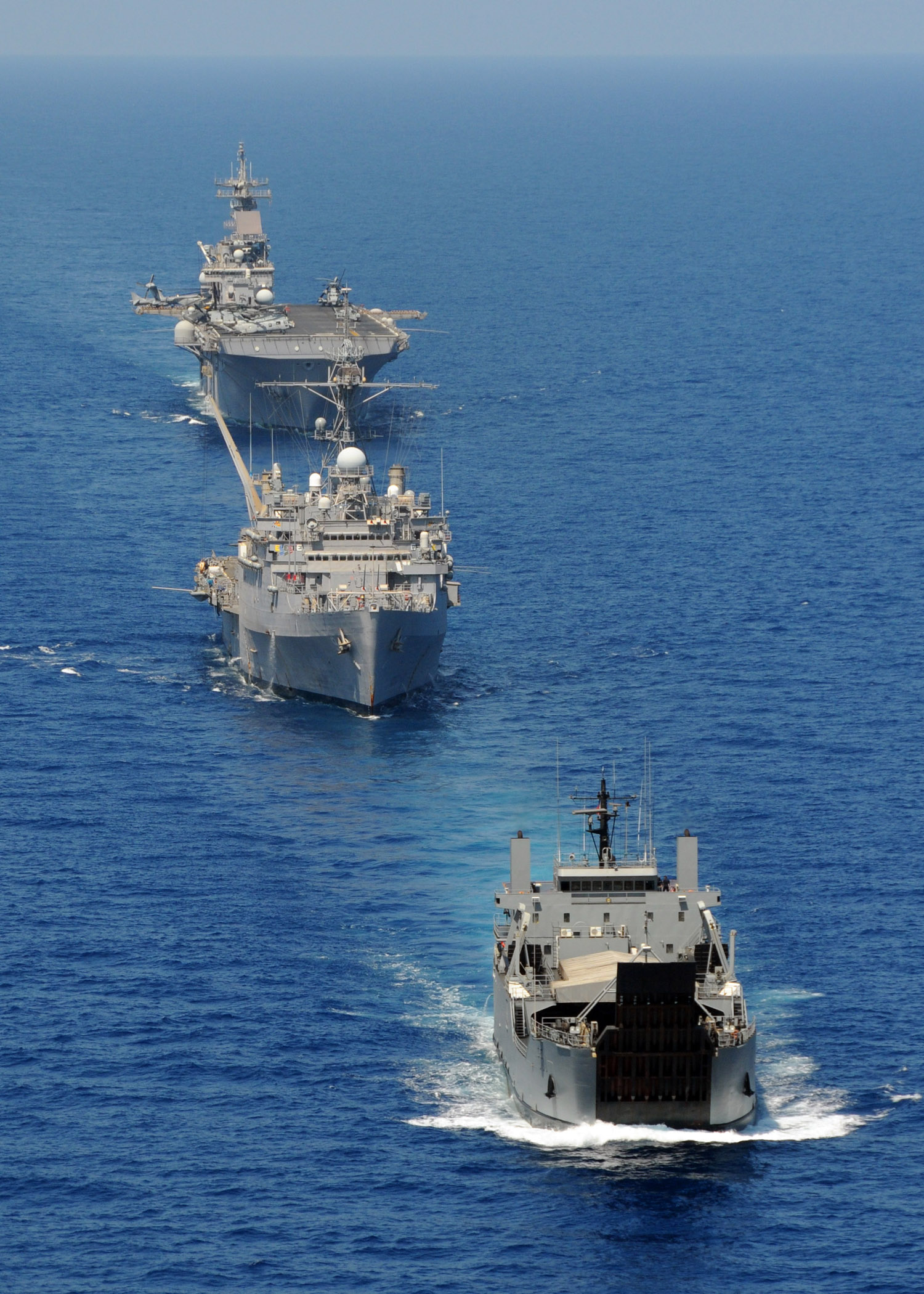
BRP Dagupan City leading US ships during Balikatan 2010 sea-phase exercises (BK10).
