= USS Gosper =

United States Navy attatck transport ship

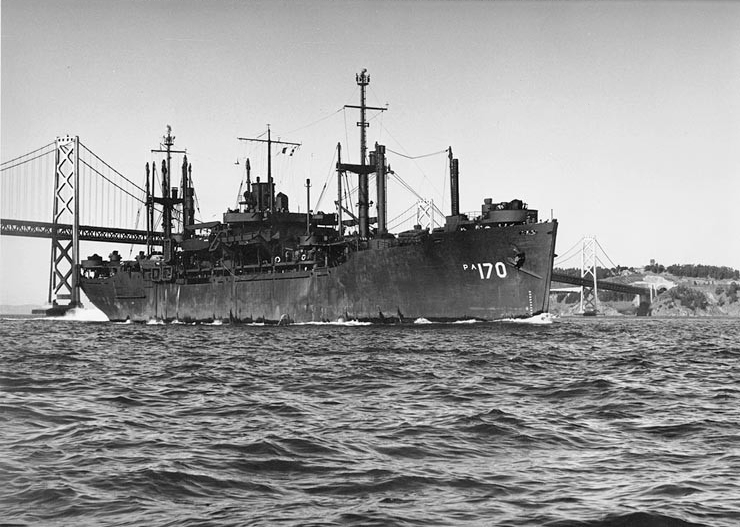

History

United States
- Name: USS Gosper
- Namesake: Gosper County, Nebraska
- Ordered: as type VC2-S-AP5
- Laid down: date unknown
- Launched: 20 October 1944
- Acquired: 18 November 1944
- Commissioned: 18 November 1944
- Decommissioned: 10 April 1946
- Stricken: 1 May 1946
- Fate: Scrapped 1974

General characteristics
- Displacement: 12,450 tons (full load)
- Length: 455 ft 0 in (138.68 m)
- Beam: 62 ft 0 in (18.90 m)
- Draught: 24 ft 0 in (7.32 m)
- Speed: 19 knots
- Complement: 536
- Armament: one 5 in (130 mm) gun mount, twelve 40 mm gun mounts, ten 20 mm gun mounts

USS Gosper (APA-170) was a Haskell-class attack transport in service with the United States Navy from 1944 to 1946. She was scrapped in 1974.

== History ==
Gosper was launched under United States Maritime Commission contract by Oregon Shipbuilding Corp., Portland, Oregon, 20 October 1944; sponsored by Mrs. E. P. Nelson; transferred to the Navy and commissioned 18 November 1944.

=== World War II ===
Gosper sailed for Seattle, Washington, to load supplies 29 November and arrived San Francisco, California, 6 December to take on landing craft. The ship then departed for shakedown training off the coast of southern California followed by amphibious exercises, and return to San Diego, California, 6 January 1945. Loading troops and supplies, the transport sailed for Pearl Harbor on two voyages to aid in the Navy's great push across the Pacific, arriving there for the second time 27 February.

At Pearl Harbor it was decided to convert Gosper into a much-needed casualty evacuation transport, and she was furnished with operating rooms and other hospital facilities. The ship was to take part in the historic Okinawa invasion, and departed Pearl Harbor 18 March for Ulithi, where she arrived 31 March.

Gosper arrived Kerama Retto 6 April, just 5 days after the initial landings on nearby Okinawa. During that grim day the ship was almost constantly under suicide attack as the Japanese tried desperately to stop the invasion. Gosper shot down at least one attacker that day, while transports SS Hobos Victory and SS Logan Victory and LST-4W were sunk. The ship remained at Kerama Retto caring for casualties of the bitter fighting ashore until 17 April, after which she sailed to Ulithi and Guam, unloading her wounded at the Naval Hospital 24 April.

Sailing to Saipan, Gosper loaded over 1,000 reserve combat troops and got underway for Okinawa again, arriving off the beaches 1 May. Until 10 July she stayed at anchor at Kerama Retto, caring for the casualties and helping to fight off the air raids incessantly mounted by the Japanese. She sailed to Buckner Bay, on the east side of Okinawa, 10 July, and from there joined a convoy to Ulithi, Pearl Harbor, and San Francisco, where she arrived 7 August 1945.

Under repair when the war ended, Gosper was pressed into use carrying occupation forces to the Far East. She sailed 26 August for the Philippines, anchoring at Manila 15 September. There she took on board, because of her medical facilities, a large group of American, British, and Canadian servicemen who had been prisoners of war on Japanese-held islands, some since 1941. She carried these veterans via Pearl Harbor to Seattle, where she arrived 12 October. Gosper then joined the "Operation Magic Carpet" fleet for the gigantic task of bringing home the combat-weary soldiers from the Pacific, sailing from Seattle 26 October. She made two passages to Pearl Harbor and back, carrying veterans, and departed 8 February 1946 for the U.S. East Coast, via the Panama Canal.

=== Decommissioning and fate ===
Gosper arrived Newport News, Virginia, 24 February 1946, and decommissioned 10 April 1946. She was subsequently returned to the United States Maritime Commission and placed in the National Defense Reserve Fleet in the James River, Virginia. In 1946 she was struck from the Navy List. She was sold for scrapping on 15 March 1974 to Isaac Verla, Castellon de la Plana, Spain, for $127,007.

== Awards ==
Gosper received one battle star for World War II service.
