= Bacolod City-class support vessel =

Philippine Navy class of transport ships

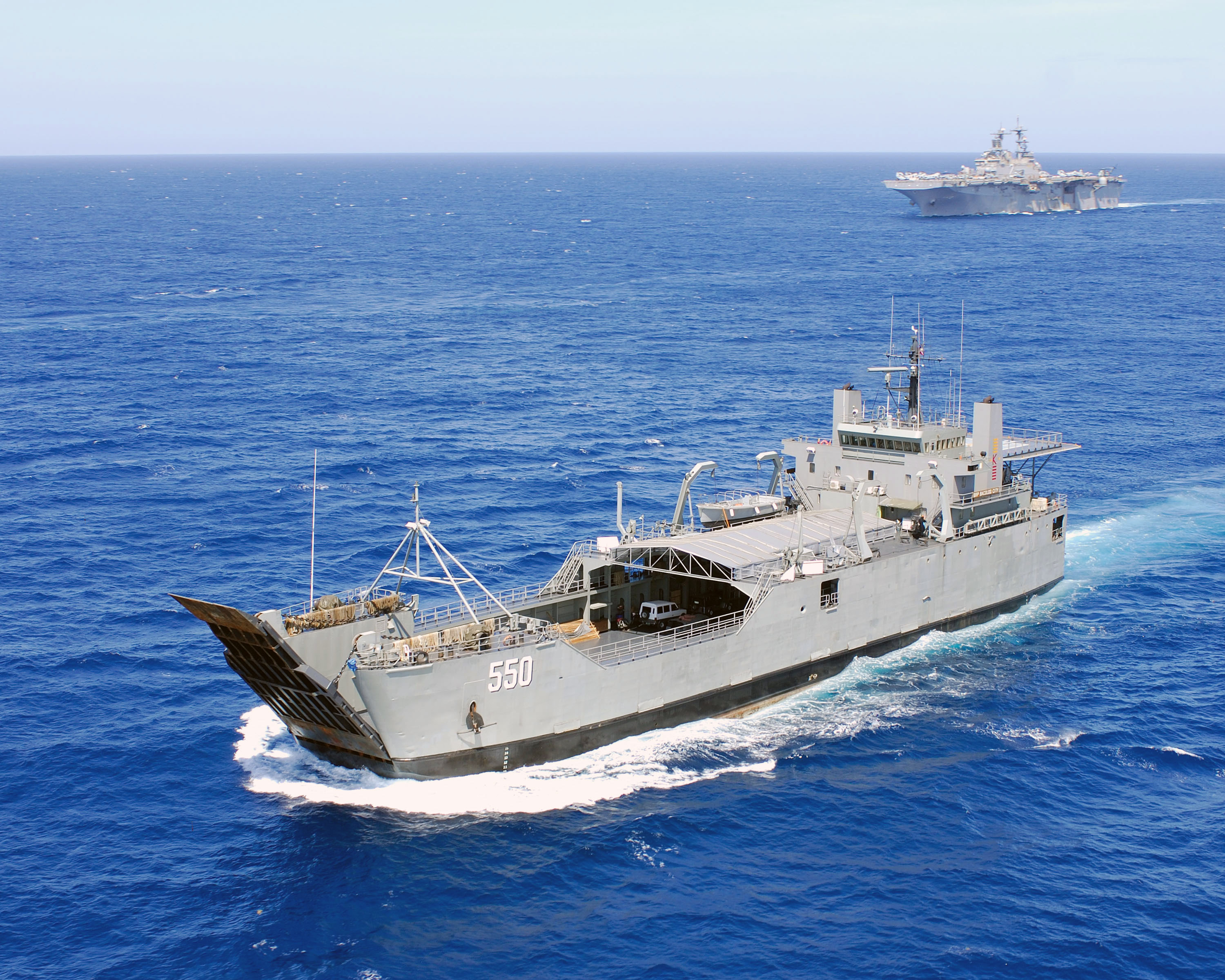
- BRP Bacolod City (LC-550), lead ship of the Bacolod City class Logistics Support Vessel, with USS Essex at Balikatan in 2008

Class overview
- Name: Bacolod City class Logistics Support Vessel
- Builders: Halter/Moss Point Marine, Escatawpa, Mississippi
- Operators: Philippine Navy
- Planned: 2
- Completed: 2
- Active: 2

General characteristics
- Class & type: Bacolod City class
- Type: Logistics Support Vessel
- Displacement: 4,265 tons (full load)
- Length: 273 ft (83 m)
- Beam: 60 ft (18 m) with ramp folded
- Draft: 12 ft (3.7 m)
- Installed power: 5,800 hp (4,300 kW)
- Propulsion: 2 × GM EMD 16V-645E6 diesel engines
- Speed: 12 knots (22 km/h) maximum; 10 knots (19 km/h) sustained
- Range: 8,300 nautical miles (15,400 km) at 10 knots (19 km/h)
- Boats & landing craft carried: 2 × LCVPs on davits
- Capacity: 2,280 tons (900 tons for amphibious operations) of vehicles, containers or cargo, plus 150 troops
- Complement: 6 Officers and 24 enlisted
- Sensors & processing systems: Raytheon SPS-64(V)2 I-band Navigation Radar
- Armament: 2 × Oerlikon Mark 10 20mm/70 caliber guns; 4 × Browning M2HB .50 caliber heavy machine guns.
- Aviation facilities: Helipad at aft deck

The Bacolod City class is a ship class of two Logistics Support Vessels currently in service of the Philippine Navy, commissioned during the early 1990s and named after the provincial capital of Negros Occidental. These ships were based on a helicopter capable variant of the United States Army's General Frank S. Besson, Jr. class Logistics Support Vessel.

== History ==
The two Bacolod City class ships were built by Halter/Moss Point Marine of Escatawpa, Mississippi in the United States. The first unit, BRP Bacolod City (LC-550) was commissioned into Philippine Navy in December 1993, while sister ship BRP Dagupan City (LC-551) was commissioned in April 1994. Both ships were purchased brand-new by the Philippine government through the Foreign Military Sales program of the United States. Since commissioning, both ships have been rigorously used in military and peacetime operations, and have participated in joint military exercises with foreign navies.

Presently they are assigned with the Sealift Amphibious Force (formerly Service Force) of the Philippine Fleet.

== Technical details ==
The ships are powered by two General Motors-EMD 16-645EZ6 diesel engines with a combined power of around 5,800 hp (4,300 kW) driving two propellers. The main engines can propel the 1,400 ton (4,265 tons full load) ship at a maximum speed of 12 knots (22 km/h). At a sustained speed of 10 knots (19 km/h), the vessels have a range of 8,300 nautical miles (15,370 km).

As an amphibious transport, it is fairly armed for defensive purposes, and carries four 12.mm heavy machine guns at the front side decks, and two Oerlikon 20 mm cannons near its two personnel landing craft (LCVP's).

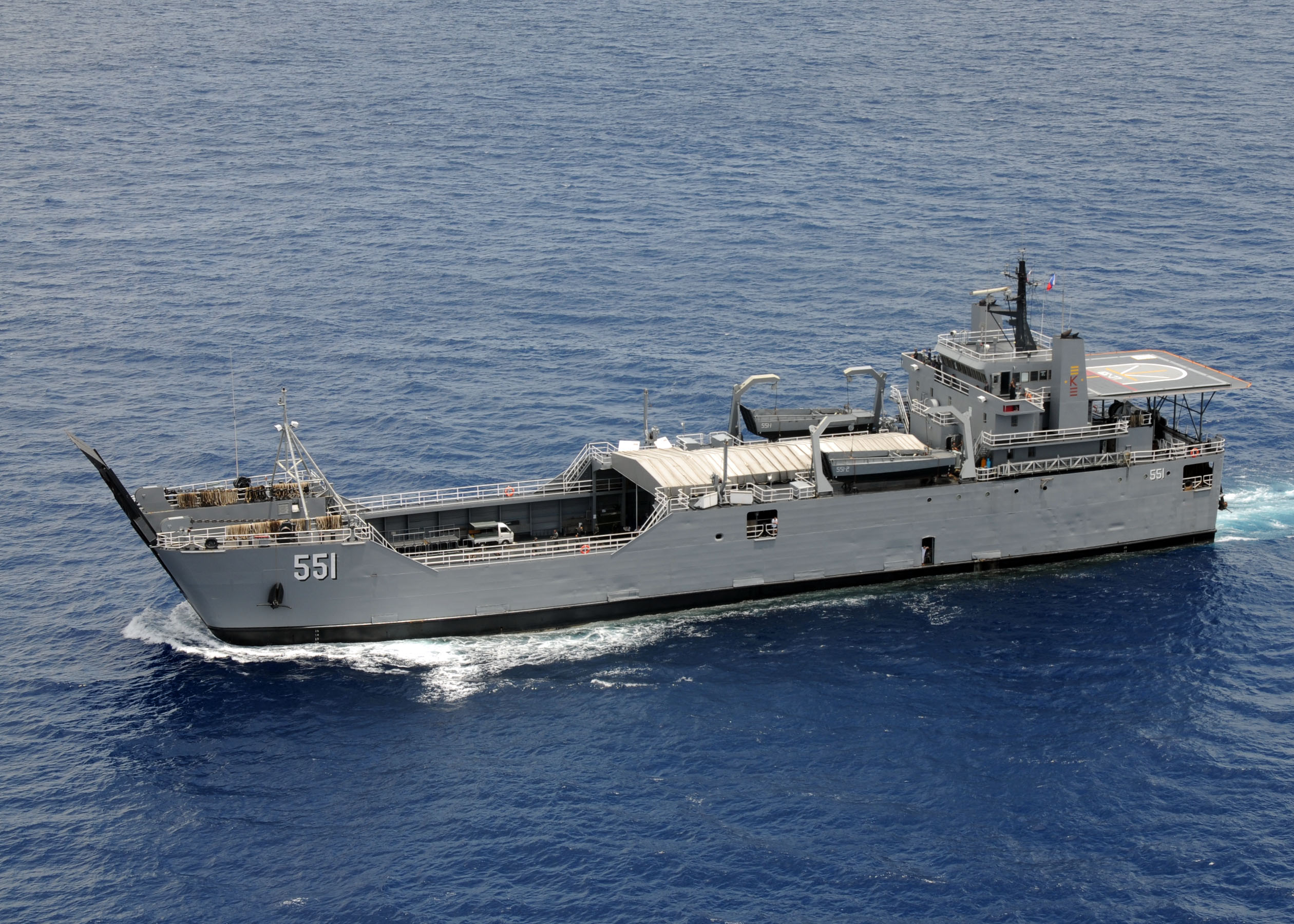
BRP Dagupan City (LC-551) at Balikatan Exercises in 2009

The prime mission of the ship is the direct transport and discharge of liquid and dry cargo to shallow terminal areas, remote under-developed coastlines and on inland waterways. The ship does not require external cranes or port facilities, and even in only four feet of water under full load, the ship is still able to land. This capability expands the choice of landing locations, and at the same time reduces the potential enemy impact on the logistics support operations.

The ships have a capacity to transport up to 48 TEU or 2,280 tons vehicles/general cargo, or up to 900 tons on Logistics Over The Shore (LOTS)/amphibious operations. The ramps and main deck are able to support roll-on/roll-off for vehicles up to main battle tanks.

== Ships in Class ==
| Ship name | Bow number | Commissioned | Service | Status |
|---|---|---|---|---|
| BRP Bacolod City | LS-550 | 1 December 1993 | Sealift Amphibious Force | Active |
| BRP Dagupan City | LS-551 | 5 April 1994 | Sealift Amphibious Force | Active |

== See also ==
- Philippine Navy
- Logistics Support Vessel
