= BRP Quezon =

Philippine Navy ship

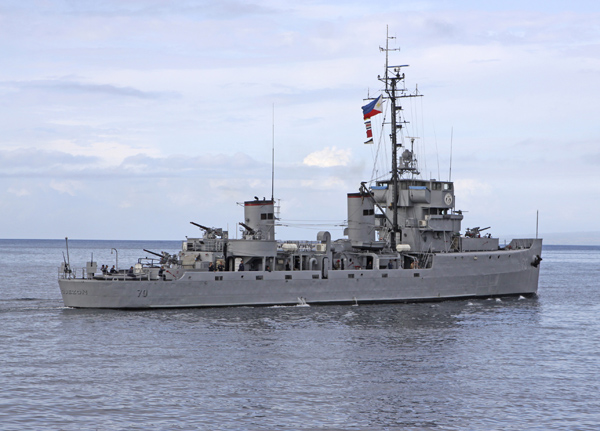
- BRP Quezon (PS-70)

History

United States
- Name: Vigilance
- Ordered: 1942
- Builder: Associated Shipbuilders
- Laid down: 28 November 1942 as HMS Exploit (BAM-24)
- Launched: 5 April 1943
- Commissioned: 28 February 1944
- Decommissioned: 30 January 1947
- Stricken: 1 December 1966
- Fate: Transferred to Philippine Navy in 1967.

Philippines
- Name: Quezon
- Namesake: Province of Quezon in Luzon Island
- Operator: Philippine Navy
- Commissioned: 19 August 1967
- Decommissioned: 01 March 2021
- Fate: Sunk as target, 5 May 2026

General characteristics
- Class & type: Rizal-class patrol corvette
- Displacement: 890 tons standard, 1,250 tons full load
- Length: 221.67 ft (67.57 m)
- Beam: 32.67 ft (9.96 m)
- Draft: 10.75 ft (3.28 m)
- Installed power: 5,800 shp (4,300 kW)
- Propulsion: 2 × EMD 16V-645C Diesel Engines
- Speed: 20 knots (37 km/h; 23 mph) (maximum)
- Range: 5,000 mi (4,300 nmi; 8,000 km) at 14 knots (26 km/h; 16 mph)
- Complement: 80
- Sensors & processing systems: Raytheon SPS-5C G/H-band Surface Search Radar; Raytheon SPS-64(V)11 Radar; DAS 3 I-band Navigation Radar; SQS-17B hull-mounted Sonar (high frequency); Mk52 GFCS for 3"/50 guns; Mk51 GFCS for 40 mm guns
- Armament: 2 × 3"/50 caliber gun Mk.22 dual purpose guns; 2 × Mk.1 Mod2 Twin 60-caliber Bofors 40 mm gun; 2 × Twin Oerlikon 20 mm 70-caliber guns; 4 × M2 Browning 12.7 mm 50-caliber heavy machine guns

BRP Quezon (PS-70) was one of two Rizal-class ships in service with the Philippine Navy. She was formerly a USN Auk-class minesweeper produced during World War II, and was later on classified as a patrol corvette protecting the vast waters of the Philippines.

Along with other ex-World War II veteran ships of the Philippine Navy, she was considered one of the oldest active fighting ships in the world, up until its decommissioning on 1 March 2021 after serving a total of 77 years, of which 53 years were with the Philippine Navy.

== History ==
USS Vigilance (AM-324) was originally laid down for the Royal Navy under the lend-lease program as HMS Exploit (BAM-24). However, the United States Navy decided to keep the ship and renamed her Vigilance (AM-324) on 23 January 1943.

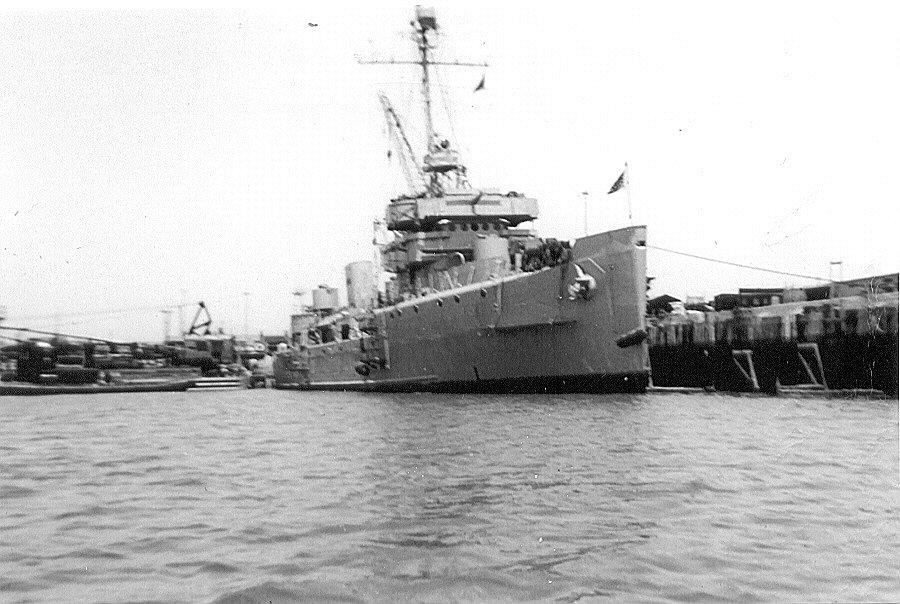
as USS Vigilance circa 1946

Commissioned in the US Navy in 1944, her first duties included screening of transport convoys between Pearl Harbor and the Marshall Islands and local escort duties between Guam, Peleliu, and Ulithi. She also did minesweeping duties and anti-submarine patrols near Okinawa, was able to assist in anti-aircraft duties with other vessels, and assisting in firefighting and treatment of wounded from USS Whitehurst and USS England. She was able to shoot a number of attacking Japanese aircraft during this period. She continued on minesweeping and patrol duties in Leyte, Philippine Islands, and in the Japanese home islands before and after Japan surrendered. With her service during World War II, she was awarded with three battle stars.

She was then transferred to the Philippines on 19 August 1967 and was commissioned to the Philippine Navy as the RPS (now BRP) Quezon (PS-70), and together with her sister ship, was one of the Navy's main warships during the 1960s up to the present.

She was stricken from the navy in late 1994, but was overhauled at the Cavite Naval Dockyard and returned to service in 1995. Some of her weapons were also removed, mainly its anti-submarine equipment due to lack of spare parts. This includes the five Mk6 depth charge projectors and two depth charge racks. This move totally removed her anti-submarine warfare capabilities, which were outdated. Quezon completed a rehabilitation overhaul in April 1996 by Hatch & Kirk, wherein she was fitted with a re-manufactured EMD 645C diesel engines, rehabilitation works, and equipping the ship with state-of-the-art safety equipment on deck and engine room with all digital control panels. Recent upgrades includes a satellite radio dish for communications.

== Present status ==
Her last classification was Patrol Corvette. She was assigned to the Patrol Force of the Philippine Navy, which was later renamed as the Offshore Combat Force.

The ship retired on 1 March 2021 together with 3 other ageing navy ships. The BRP Quezon was reportedly sunk as an anti-ship target during the 2026 Balikatan exercises.

== Notable deployments and operations ==
=== Exercises ===
On 10 April 2007, Quezon, together with BRP Artemio Ricarte and BRP Bienvenido Salting, took part in a ten-day naval exercises with the Malaysian Navy dubbed "MALPHI LAUT 2007". Malaysian vessels that took part include KD Kedah, KD Laksamana Tan Pusmah, and KD Yu.

On 19–23 July 2011, BRP Quezon together with BRP Bacolod City was part of Amphibious Exercise PAGSISIKAP 2011 held in Manila Bay.

=== Deployments ===
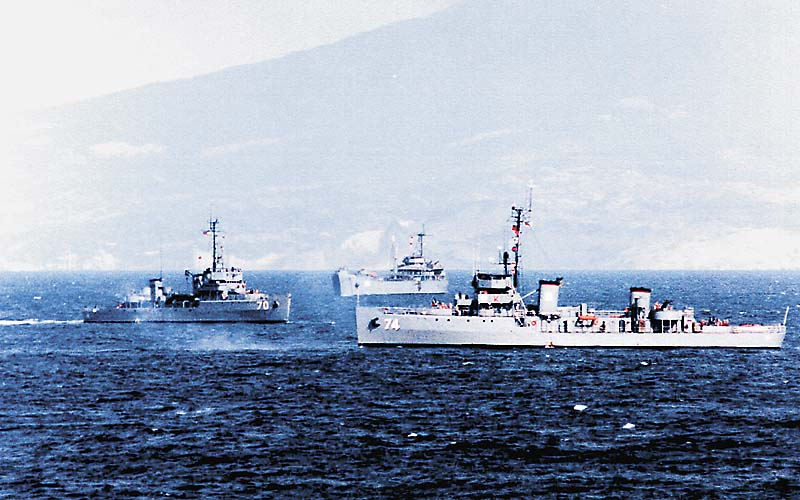
The two Rizal-class corvettes at Balikatan 2000 exercises.

BRP Quezon represented the Philippines in the Indonesian Fleet Review and Sail Bunaken 2009 festival, an international sea event held in Manado, North Sulawesi, Indonesia.

BRP Quezon together with BRP Dagupan City were sent to Singapore and Malaysia from November to December 2009 for an overseas training cruise for students from the Naval Education and Training Command and the Fleet Training Center, and as part of the Philippine contingent at Langkawi International Maritime and Aerospace Exhibit (LIMA) in Malaysia.

== See also ==
- List of decommissioned ships of the Philippine Navy
