= USS Murrelet =

Minesweeper of the United States Navy

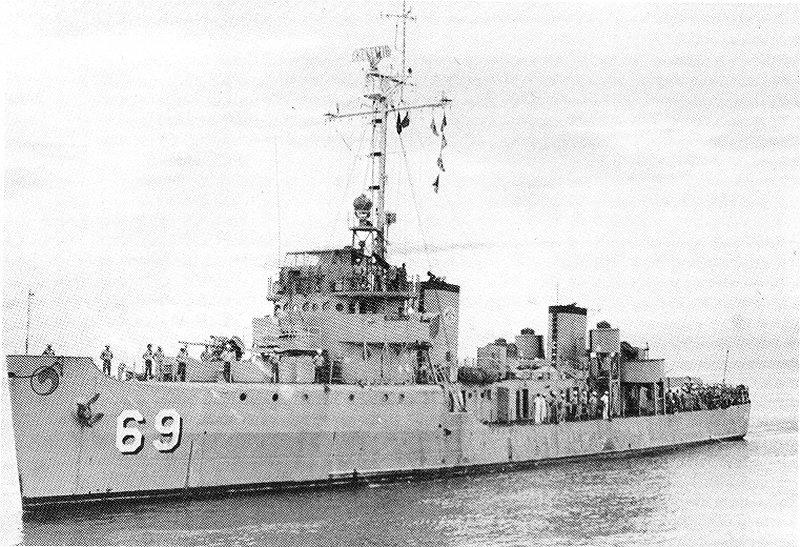

History

United States
- Name: USS Murrelet
- Builder: Savannah Machine & Foundry Co., Savannah, Georgia
- Laid down: 24 August 1944
- Launched: 29 December 1944
- Commissioned: 21 August 1945
- Decommissioned: 20 June 1946
- Recommissioned: 28 October 1950
- Decommissioned: 14 March 1957
- Reclassified: MSF-372, 7 February 1955
- Stricken: 1 December 1964
- Honours and awards: 5 battle stars (Korea)
- Fate: Transferred to the Philippines, June 1965

Philippines
- Name: BRP Rizal (PCE-69)
- Acquired: June 1965
- Decommissioned: 29 January 2020
- Fate: Decommissioned

General characteristics
- Class & type: Auk-class minesweeper
- Displacement: 890 long tons (904 t)
- Length: 221 ft 3 in (67.44 m)
- Beam: 32 ft (9.8 m)
- Draft: 10 ft 9 in (3.28 m)
- Speed: 18 knots (33 km/h; 21 mph)
- Complement: 100 officers and enlisted
- Armament: 1 × 3"/50 caliber gun; 2 × 40 mm guns; 2 × 20 mm guns; 2 × Depth charge tracks

USS Murrelet (AM-372) was an Auk-class minesweeper acquired by the United States Navy to remove mines from minefields laid to prevent ships from passing. She was the only U.S. Navy ship named for the murrelet, a small sea bird found chiefly on islands in the northern Pacific Ocean.

Murrelet was laid down 29 August 1944 by the Savannah Machine & Foundry Co., Savannah, Georgia; launched 29 December 1944; sponsored by Mrs. W. L. Mingledorff; and commissioned 21 August 1945.

== Service history ==
=== Post-World War II operations ===
Following shakedown off Virginia, Murrelet departed Little Creek, Virginia, and steamed for Japan, arriving Sasebo on 14 January 1946. She engaged in sweeping operations in Japanese and Korean waters until 22 April, when she steamed for the west coast. Murrelet was decommissioned on 20 June 1946, and entered the Pacific Reserve Fleet at San Diego.

=== Korean War ===
After hostilities broke out in Korea, Murrelet recommissioned 28 October 1950. She reported to COMINRON 5 for extensive minesweeping training at Long Beach, California, 6 March 1951. She arrived Yokosuka, Japan, in August 1951 to aid United Nations forces meeting the challenge of Communist aggression. Departing Yokosuka on 21 August, she sailed to Korea, participating in operations north of Wonsan, in the Hungnam, Songjin, and Chongjin areas. She resumed shelling and sweeping operations at Songjin on 27 November 1951, after returning from a period of yard duty at Yokosuka. She continued sweeping and patrol duties off Korea in 1952, capturing and destroying enemy sampans, until July, when she returned to the west coast.

Murrelet started a second tour of duty off Korea in April 1953, returning to Long Beach, California, in December. Redesignated MSF-372, 7 February 1955, she continued to operate off the west coast of the United States, except for a third WestPac deployment that year.

She decommissioned 14 March 1957, and was assigned to the Pacific Reserve Fleet, at Columbia City, Oregon. Struck from the Naval Register on 1 December 1964, she was transferred in June 1965 to the Philippine Navy under the Foreign Military Assistance Program, and served as BRP Rizal (PS-74).

== Awards ==
Murrelet received five battle stars for Korean service.
