= Quezon (surname) =

Quezon is a surname in the Philippines. Notable people with this surname include:

- Manuel L. Quezon (1878–1944), 2nd President of the Philippines
- Aurora Quezon (1888–1949), First Lady of the Philippines from 1935 to 1944
- Manolo Quezon (born 1970), Filipino writer, former television host and a grandson of former Philippine president Manuel L. Quezon
