= BRP Bacolod City =

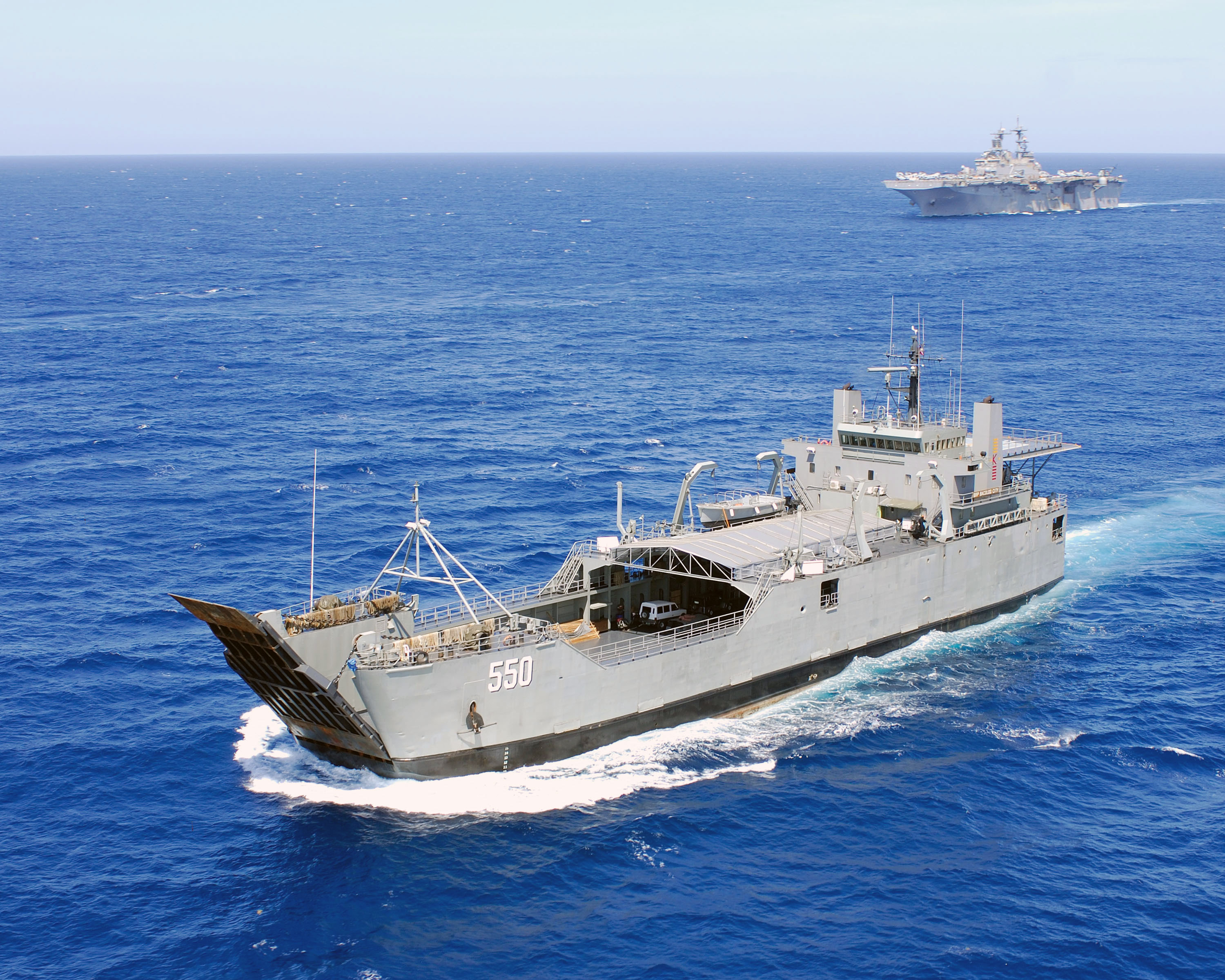
- BRP Bacolod City (LS-550)

History

Philippines
- Name: Bacolod City
- Namesake: Bacolod, Negros Occidental.
- Operator: Philippine Navy
- Builder: Halter/Moss Point Marine, Escatawpa, MS.
- Commissioned: 1 December 1993
- Renamed: BRP Bacolod City (LC-550) – until April 2016; BRP Bacolod City (LS-550) – from April 2016
- Status: in active service

General characteristics
- Class & type: Bacolod City-class logistics support vessel
- Displacement: 4,265 tons (Full Load)
- Length: 273 ft (83 m)
- Beam: 60 ft (18 m) (folded)
- Draft: 12 ft (3.7 m)
- Installed power: 5,800 hp (4,300 kW)
- Propulsion: 2 × GM EMD 16V-645E6 diesel engines
- Speed: 12 knots (22 km/h; 14 mph) (maximum), 10 knots (sustained)
- Range: 8,300 nmi (15,400 km; 9,600 mi) at 10 knots (19 km/h; 12 mph)
- Boats & landing craft carried: 2 × LCVPs on davits
- Capacity: 2,280 tons (900 tons for amphibious operations) of vehicles, containers or cargo, plus 150 troops
- Complement: (30) 6 – Officers/ 24 – Enlisted Personnel
- Sensors & processing systems: Raytheon SPS-64(V)2 I-band Navigation Radar
- Armament: 2 × Mk.10 20 mm Oerlikon cannons; 2 × M2 12.7 mm machine guns
- Aircraft carried: none permanently assigned
- Aviation facilities: Helipad at aft deck

BRP Bacolod City (LS-550) is the lead ship of two Bacolod City-class logistics support vessel, and is based on a helicopter capable variant of the US Army's Frank S. Besson class. She is also considered one of the most modern transport ships in the Philippine Navy, having been commissioned during the early 1990s. She was previously known as BRP Bacolod City (LC-550) prior to a classification change implemented by the Philippine Navy starting April 2016.

== History ==
=== Construction and commissioning ===
BRP Bacolod City was built by Halter/Moss Point Marine of Escatawpa, Mississippi in the United States and was commissioned into Philippine Navy in 1993. Both ships of its class were purchased brand-new by the Philippine government through the FMS program of the United States. Since its commissioning, both ships of its class have been rigorously used in military and peacetime operations, and have taken part in joint military exercises with foreign navies as well.

=== 1995 Pestaño incident ===
Bacolod City was briefly the subject of public scrutiny due to the September 27, 1995 onboard death of Ensign Philip Pestaño. Pestaño was found in his cabin was with a gunshot wound in his right temple during routine travel to Manila from Sangley Point in Cavite. Pestaño's family filed murder charges but the cases were eventually dismissed.

=== Current assignment ===
The Bacolod City is currently assigned with the Service Force of the Philippine Fleet.

== Technical details ==
The ship is powered by two General Motors-EMD 16-645EZ6 diesel engines with a combined power of around 5,800 hp driving two propellers. The main engines can propel the 1,400 ton (4,265 tons full load) ship at a maximum speed of around 12 knots (22 km/h). At a sustained speed of 10 knots (19 km/h), it range is at around 8,300 nautical miles (15,370 km).

As an amphibious transport, it is fairly armed for defensive purposes, and carries two M2 12.7mm machine guns at the front side decks, and two Mk.10 Oerlikon 20 mm cannons near its two LCVPs.

The prime mission of the ship is the direct transport and discharge of liquid and dry cargo to shallow terminal areas, remote under-developed coastlines and on inland waterways.

The ship does not require external cranes or port facilities, and even in only four feet of water under full load, the ship is still able to land. This capability expands the choice of landing locations, and at the same time reduces the potential enemy impact on the logistics support operations.

The ships have a capacity to transport up to 48 TEU or 2,280 tons vehicles/general cargo, or up to 900 tons on Logistics Over The Shore (LOTS) / amphibious operations. Its ramps and the main deck are able to withstand roll-on/roll-off operations of even heavy main battle tanks.

== Notable Operations ==
=== Exercises ===
Bacolod City joined BRP Juan Magluyan and BRP Artemio Ricarte and the Essex Expeditionary Strike Group during the sea exercise phase of the RP-US Balikatan 2008 in February 2008.

On 19–23 July 2011, BRP Bacolod City together with BRP Quezon was part of Amphibious Exercise PAGSISIKAP 2011 held in Manila Bay.

=== Deployments ===
The Bacolod City together with BRP Emilio Jacinto under Naval Task Group 80 will be part of 262-member contingent representing the Philippine Navy in the Langkawi International Maritime and Aerospace (LIMA) Exhibition 2011 from 6–10 December 2011 in Langkawi, Malaysia.

As part of the Armed Forces of the Philippines' response to the Coronavirus pandemic in the country, BRP Bacolod City sailed to China to obtain the medical supplies purchased by the Philippine government. Bacolod City arrived in the port of Xiamen on April 25, 2020, where the ship stayed for five days loading 23,385 boxes of personal protective equipment, 700,000 KN95 face masks and 200,000 sets of PPEs, consisting of goggles, coverall suit, head cover, gloves, shoe cover, surgical mask, and surgical gowns stored in 33 container boxes. Bacolod City left Xiamen on April 30 escorted by the PLA-N's Type 056 corvette Quanzhou (588). Bacolod City returned to the Philippines on May 8, 2020, to deliver the medical supplies to Davao City. Bacolod City left Davao on May 14 on the way to Cebu City for a scheduled port call but was then diverted to sail straight back to Naval Station Sangley Point, Cavite. The ship arrived in Cavite on May 21, 2020.

== Gallery ==
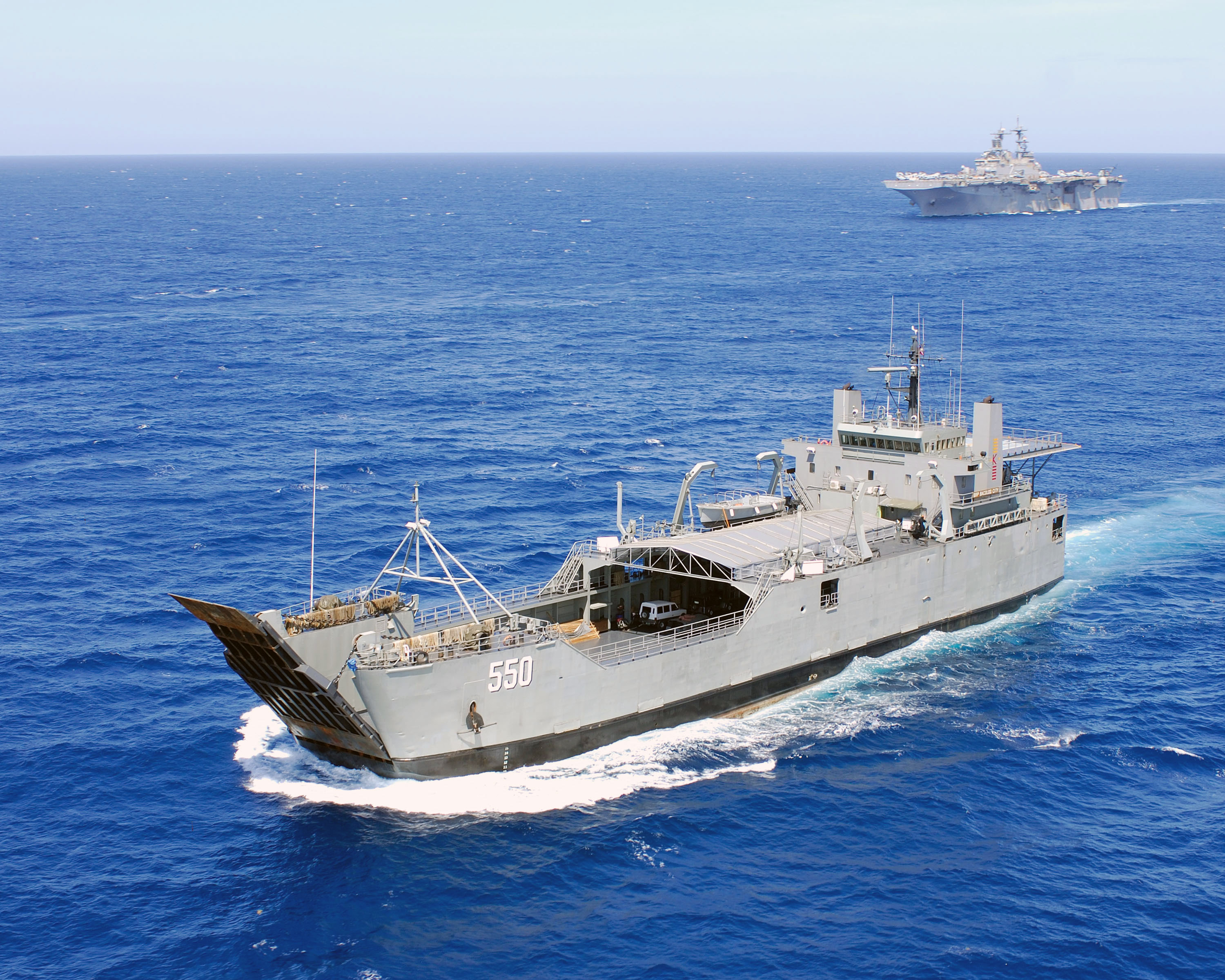
With USS Essex at Balikatan 2008

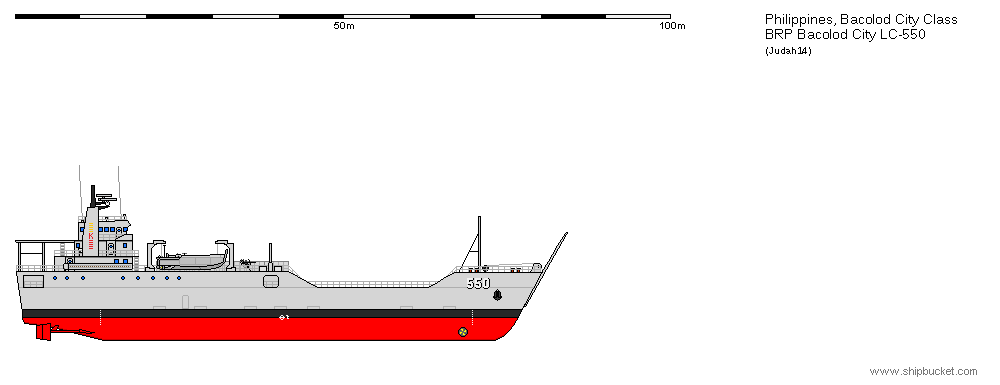
Line drawing
