= List of ship decommissionings in 1997 =

The list of ship decommissionings in 1997 includes a chronological list of all ships decommissioned in 1997.

	Operator	Ship	Flag	Class and type	Fate	Other notes
17 July	Russian Navy	Bodryy		Project 1135 guard ship	Scrapped	Kaliningrad
1 August	Royal Navy	Peacock		Peacock-class patrol vessel	Transferred to Philippine Navy	
1 August	Royal Navy	Plover		Peacock-class patrol vessel	Transferred to Philippine Navy	
1 August	Royal Navy	Starling		Peacock-class patrol vessel	Transferred to Philippine Navy	
1 October	French Navy	Clemenceau		Clemenceau-class aircraft carrier	Scrapped Hartlepool 2009-10	
23 October	United States Navy	New Orleans		Iwo Jima-class amphibious assault ship	Sunk as target, 2010	

== Bibliography ==
- Friedman, Norman (2022) [1983]. U. S. Aircraft Carriers: An Illustrated Design History (Revised ed.). Annapolis, Maryland: Naval Institute Press. ISBN 978-1-68247-762-5.
