= HMS Peacock =

Seven ships of the Royal Navy have borne the name HMS Peacock:

- English ship Peacock (1651) was a ship captured in 1651 and sold in 1658.
- HMS Peacock (1806) was an 18-gun Cruizer-class brig-sloop launched in 1806 and sunk by USS Hornet in 1813.
- HMS Peacock was an 18-gun sloop, previously USS Wasp. She was captured in 1812, renamed Loup Cervier, renamed Peacock in 1813, and foundered in 1814.
- HMS Peacock (1856) was a wooden screw Albacore-class gunboat launched in 1856 and broken up in 1869.
- HMS Peacock (1888) was a composite screw gunboat launched in 1888 and sold in 1906.
- HMS Peacock (U96) was a Black Swan-class sloop launched in 1943 and scrapped in 1958.
- HMS Peacock (P239) was a Peacock-class patrol vessel launched in 1982 and sold in 1997 to the Philippine Navy, which re-designated her the Emilio Jacinto-class corvette BRP Emilio Jacinto (PS-35).
