= HMS Plover =

Eleven ships of the Royal Navy have borne the name HMS Plover, after the species of bird, the Plover:

- HMS Plover (1652) was a 26-gun ship, previously the Dutch Morgen Star. She was captured in 1652 and either sunk in action in 1653 or sold in 1657.
- HMS Plover (1796) was an 18-gun sloop launched in 1796 and sold in 1819.
- HMS Plover (1821) was a 10-gun Cherokee-class brig-sloop launched in 1821 that became a Post Office Packet Service packet, sailing out of Falmouth, Cornwall. She was sold in 1841.
- HMS Plover (1842) was a survey cutter, previously the civilian Bentinck. She was purchased in 1842 and sold in 1854. See William Pullen.
- HMS Plover (1855) was an Albacore-class wooden screw gunboat launched in 1855 and sunk in 1859.
- HMS Plover (1860) was a Philomel-class gunvessel launched in 1860 and sold into civilian service in 1865, being renamed Hawk.
- HMS Plover (1867) was a wooden screw gunvessel launched in 1867 and sold for breaking up in 1885.
- HMS Plover (1888) was a composite screw gunboat launched in 1888. She was used as a boom defence vessel from 1904 and was sold in 1927.
- HMS Plover (1916) was an Admiralty M-class destroyer launched in 1916 and sold in 1921.
- HMS Plover (M26) was a minelayer launched in 1937 and sold in 1969.
- HMS Plover (P239) was a Peacock-class patrol vessel launched in 1983. She was sold to the Philippine Navy in 1997 and re-designated the Emilio Jacinto-class corvette BRP Apolinario Mabini.
