= Tresco =

Tresco may refer to:

- Tresco, Elizabeth Bay, a historic residence in New South Wales, Australia
- Tresco, Isles of Scilly, an island off Cornwall, England, United Kingdom
- Tresco, Victoria, a town in Victoria, Australia
- a nickname referring to the cricketer Marcus Trescothick
- English ship Tresco
