= English ship Bryer =

Warship

History

England
- Name: Bryer
- Namesake: the island of Bryher, Isles of Scilly
- Operator: Navy of the Commonwealth of England
- Acquired: Captured 7 May 1651
- Commissioned: 1651
- Fate: Given away by warrant in October 1667

General characteristics
- Type: 22-gun fifth rate
- Tons burthen: 25166/94 bm
- Length: 70 ft 0 in (21.3 m) keel for tonnage
- Beam: 26 ft 0 in (7.9 m) for tonnage
- Draught: 11 ft 0 in (3.4 m)
- Depth of hold: 8 ft 10 in (2.7 m)
- Sail plan: ship-rigged
- Complement: 85 in 1651, later 100; 45 as fireship
- Armament: As built in 1651; 18 x demi-culverins (UD); 4 x sakers (QD)

Bryer (sometimes spelt Bryar) was a fifth-rate warship of the Commonwealth of England's naval forces, one of three such ships captured from Royalist forces during 1651 (the other two were Tresco and Peacock). She was formerly the Royalist ship Peter, captured from them in Bryher Harbour in the Isles of Scilly during the spring.

She was commissioned in 1651 under Captain Robert Samsun. After the Stuart Restoration in 1660, she was taken into the new Royal Navy as HMS Bryer. In 1665 she was re-classed as a 12-gun fireship. During the Second Anglo-Dutch War she took part in the Battle of Lowestoft (under Richard Cotton) on 24 July 1665, the Battle of Vagen (under Vincent Pierse) on 2 August 1665, the attack on Tangier (under Joseph Paine) between December 1665 and March 1666, the Four Days' Battle in June 1666 and the St James's Day Fight on 25 July 1666, as well as the attack on Dutch shipping in the Vlie ("Holmes's Bonfire") in August 1666, in the last three actions while still under Paine's command. She was given away to Mr Golding by Navy Board Warrant in October 1667.
