= English ship Peacock (1651) =

Warship

History

England
- Name: Peacock
- Namesake: Captain James Peacock
- Operator: Navy of the Commonwealth of England
- Acquired: Captured October 1651
- Fate: Sold by November 1658

Peacock was a fifth-rate warship of the Commonwealth of England's naval forces, the third of three such ships captured from Royalist forces during 1651 (the other two were Tresco and Bryer). She was formerly the Royalist Falcon, captured from them in October 1651 by the fourth rate Tiger and renamed after the Tiger's commander, Captain James Peacock.

While fitted out as an 18-gun Fifth Rate, the Peacock was not recorded as commissioning at any time, and was sold by November 1658.
