= English ship Tresco =

Warship

History

England
- Name: Tresco
- Namesake: the island of Tresco, Isles of Scilly
- Operator: Navy of the Commonwealth of England
- Acquired: Captured 17 April 1651
- Commissioned: 1651
- Fate: Wrecked 12 October 1651 off Jersey

Tresco was a fifth-rate warship of the Commonwealth of England's naval forces, one of three such ships captured from Royalist forces during 1651 (the other two were Bryer and Peacock). She was formerly the Royalist Michael, captured from them in the Isles of Scilly during the spring.

She was commissioned in 1651 under Captain William Blake and sent as part of a fleet to reduce the Channel Islands (which had stayed loyal to the Royalist cause). After bombarding shore positions in St Aubin's Bay, Jersey, the Tresco struck a submerged rock and foundered with heavy loss of life.
