= BRP Artemio Ricarte =

1984 Jacinto class Corvette

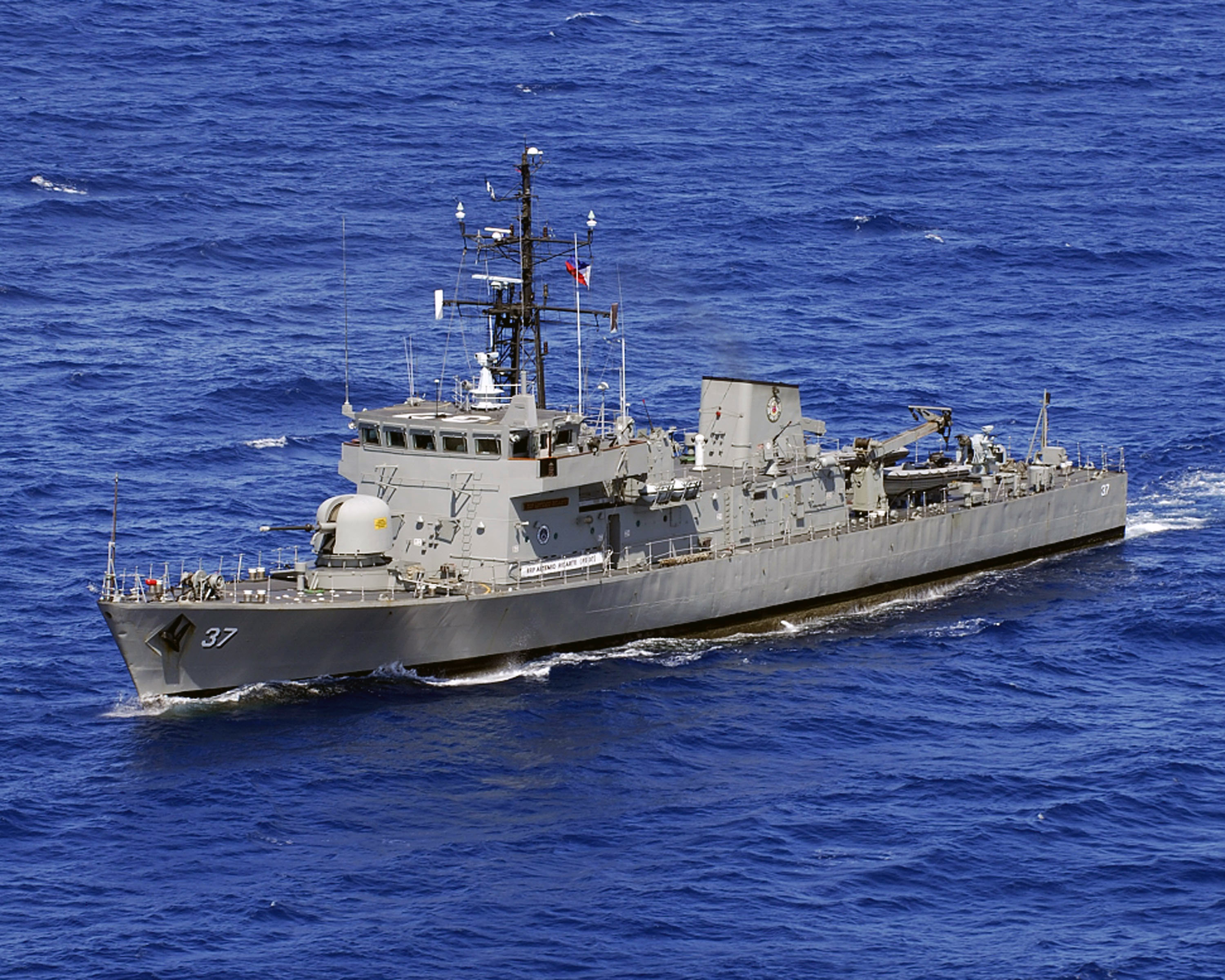
- BRP Artemio Ricarte (PS-37)

History

United Kingdom
- Name: Starling
- Builder: Hall, Russell & Company, Aberdeen
- Laid down: 1982
- Launched: 7 September 1983
- Commissioned: 1984
- Decommissioned: 1 August 1997
- Fate: Transferred to Philippine Navy in 1997.

Philippines
- Name: Artemio Ricarte
- Namesake: Gen. Artemio Ricarte (1866-1945), a Filipino general during the Philippine Revolution and Philippine - American War. He is also considered to be the "Father of the Philippine Army".
- Operator: Philippine Navy
- Acquired: 1 August 1997
- Commissioned: 4 August 1997
- Status: In service
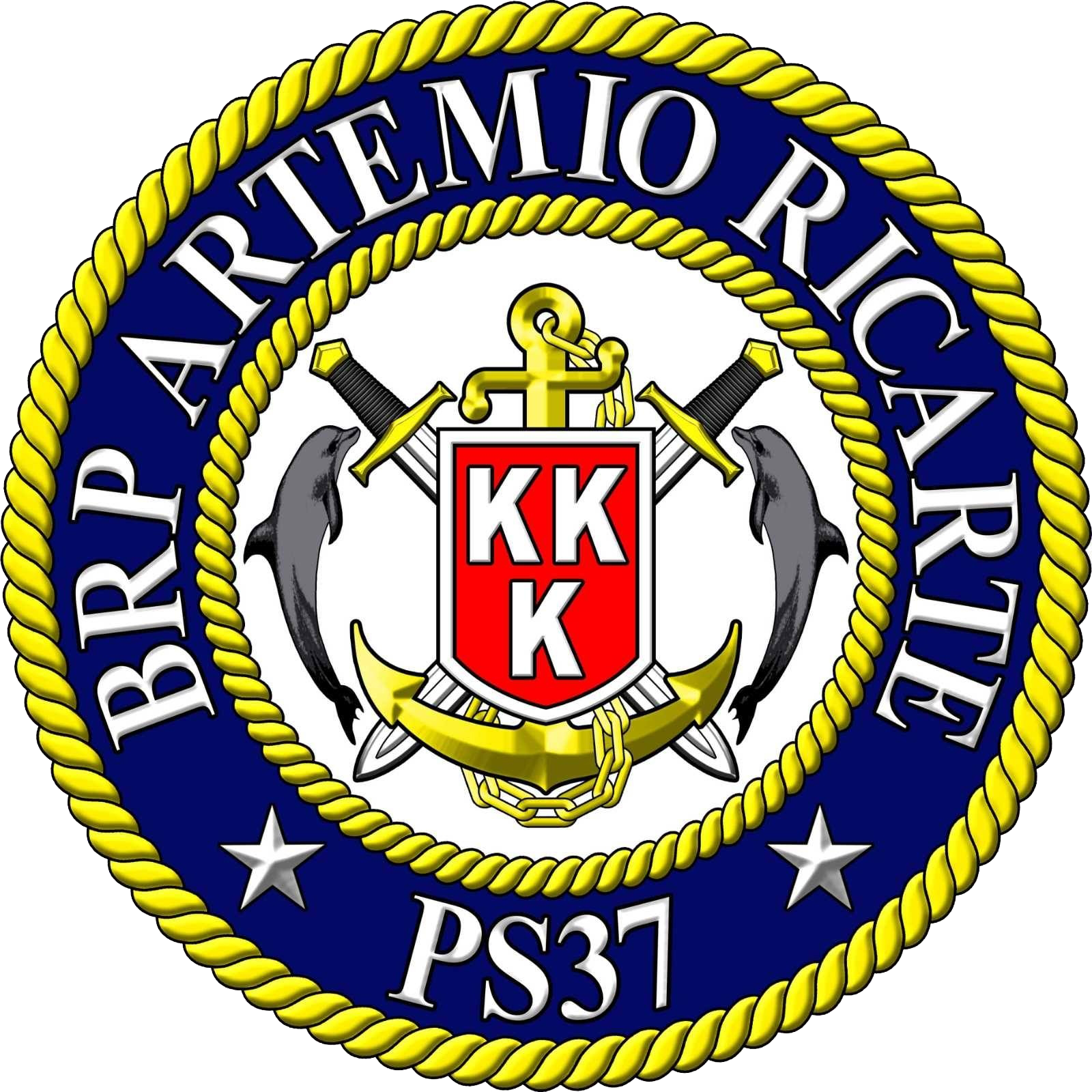
- Badge

General characteristics
- Class & type: Jacinto class
- Type: Patrol Corvette
- Displacement: 763 tons full load
- Length: 205.4 ft (62.6 m)
- Beam: 32.8 ft (10.0 m)
- Draft: 8.9 ft (2.7 m)
- Installed power: 3 × CAT 3406C diesel generators each producing 465 bhp (347 kW)
- Propulsion: 2 × APE-Crossley SEMT-Pielstick 18 PA6 V 280 Diesel engines producing 14,188 bhp (10,580 kW); 2 × shafts; 1 × Schottel S103 LSVEST drop-down, shrouded loiter retractable propeller, 181 shp (135 kW)
- Speed: 25 knots (46 km/h) sustained speed
- Endurance: 2,500 nmi (4,600 km) at 17 knots (31 km/h)
- Boats & landing craft carried: 2 × Avon Searaider 5.4m 30 knots (56 km/h) 10-man Semi-rigid boat aft
- Complement: 31
- Sensors & processing systems: Ultra Electronics Fire Control System; Kelvin Hughes Sharpeye X & S-band Surface Search & Navigation Radars; Ultra Electronics Series 1700 Electro-Optical Tracking System
- Armament: 1 × Oto Melara MK-75 (76 mm) Super Rapid gun; 1 × MSI DS25 25mm naval gun; 2 × 20 mm Mk 16 cannons on Mk 68 mount; 2 × 12.7 mm/.50cal M2 machine guns
- Armor: Belted Steel

BRP Artemio Ricarte (PS-37) is third ship of the Jacinto-class patrol vessels currently assigned to the Offshore Combat Force of the Philippine Fleet. She is one of few ships in the Philippine Navy equipped with modern systems after the completion of combat, navigation and weapon systems upgrade of her class in August 2019. She was originally called HMS Starling (P241) during her service with the Royal Navy.

== History ==
HMS Starling at Hall, Russell & Co., Aberdeen shipyard

Launched as the third of five patrol vessels of the Peacock class, she was originally part of the Hong Kong Squadron of the Royal Navy. The ships were built by Hall, Russell & Company in the United Kingdom and were commissioned into Royal Navy service from 1983 to 1984. The class was designed specifically for patrol duties in Hong Kong waters. As well as ‘flying the flag’ and providing a constant naval presence in region, they could undertake a number of different roles including Seamanship, Navigation and Gunnery training and Search-and-Rescue duties for which they had facilities to carry divers (including a decompression chamber) and equipment to recover vessels and aircraft. They also worked with the Marine Department of the Royal Hong Kong Police Force and with Customs & Excise in order to prevent the constant flow of illegal immigrants, narcotics and electronic equipment into the Colony.

Out of the five ships in its class, three of them, HMS Peacock (P239), HMS Plover (P240), and HMS Starling (P241), were left in Hong Kong until 1997. They were sold to the Philippines as a sign of goodwill, and were officially turned over to the Philippine Navy on 1 August 1997 when Hong Kong was ceded back to China.

== Notable Deployments ==
=== Naval Exercises ===
The Artemio Ricarte was part of the Philippine Navy contingent to join CARAT 2004, together with her sistership BRP Emilio Jacinto. This was followed immediately with a separate exercise with two Royal Navy ships, namely HMS Exeter (D89) and RFA Grey Rover (A269).

On 10 April 2007, Artemio Ricarte, together with BRP Quezon and BRP Bienvenido Salting, took part in a 10-day naval exercises with the Malaysian Navy dubbed "MALPHI LAUT 2007". Malaysian vessels that took part include KD Kedah, KD Laksamana Tan Pusmah, and KD Yu.

She joined BRP Juan Magluyan (PG-392) and BRP Bacolod City (LC-550) and the Essex Expeditionary Strike Group during the sea exercise phase of the RP-US Balikatan 2008 in February 2008.

She was again included in the recently concluded CARAT 2008 exercises with the US Navy last May - June 2008. She was joined by BRP Nicolas Mahusay (PG-116), BRP Boni Serrano (PG-111) and the Philippine Coast Guard ship BRP Pampanga (AU-003).

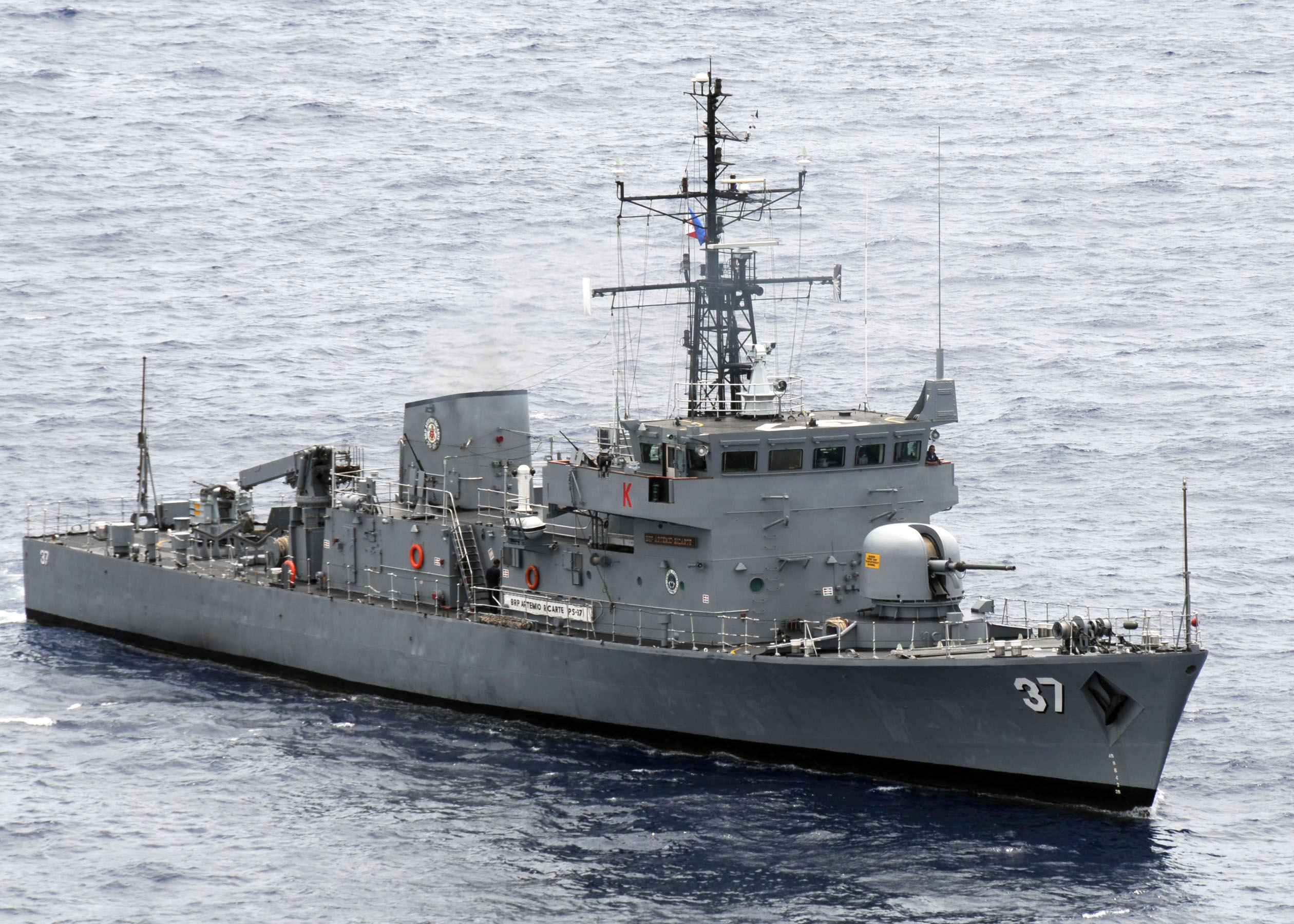
BRP Artemio Ricarte at RP-US Baliktan Exercises, April 2009

The Artemio Ricarte, together with BRP Leopoldo Regis (PG-847), BRP Dagupan City (LC-551), BRP Rajah Humabon (PF-11), USS Essex (LHD-2), and USS Tortuga (LSD-46) were part of the naval component of the US-RP Balikatan 2009 bi-lateral exercises held in April 2009.

== Technical details ==
The ships under this class are characterized by a low freeboard, an Oto-Melara 76 mm gun turret located forward, large funnel amidships and a crane and rigid-hulled inflatable boat (RHIB) aft.

The Oto Melara 76 mm Compact DP (Dual Purpose) gun is the primary weapon and is mounted in a turret forward of the bridge. It has a range of up to 10 nautical miles (20 km) and can be used against ships, aircraft or ground targets. It is remotely controlled from within the Combat Information Center by the gunnery officer and has no crew within the turret itself. The gun can fire 80 rounds in 60 seconds from its ready magazine, and the ships can carry a total of 450 rounds.

The secondary weapon (located at the stern) is a M242 Bushmaster 25 mm cannon in an MSI Defense System DS-25 Seahawk A1 mount.

Both guns are automated and are integrated with the Ultra Electronics Fire Control System and Series 1700 Electro-optical tracking system (EOTS).

In addition to the abovementioned guns, these ships also carry two .50 caliber heavy machine guns at the bridgewings, and two 20 mm Mk.16 cannons on Mk.68 mounts at the midships.

The Ultra Electronics Series 1700 EOTS replaced the Radamec 1500 Series 2500 installed by the PN in 2005, which in turn replaced the older GSA7 Sea Archer Mk 1 electro-optical director with a GEC V3800 thermal imager added in 1987.

The ships are powered by two APE-Crossley SEMT-Pielstick diesels (14,188 bhp combined) driving two three-bladed propellers. It has a drop down loiter engine with a shrouded prop of 181 bhp (135 kW) used to keep station and save fuel. The main engines can propel the 664 ton (712 tons full load) ship at over 28 knots (52 km/h), with a sustained speed of 25 knots (46 km/h). Its range is 2,500 nautical miles (4,630 km) at 17 knots (31 km/h).

These corvettes were specifically designed for Asian service, having air-conditioned crew spaces and have been designed to stay at sea during typhoons and other strong weather anomalies common to Asian seas. The ships were modified soon after entering Royal Navy service with deeper bilge keels to alleviate a propensity to roll during moderate and heavy seas.

The ship also carries two Avon Searaider 5.4 m, 30 kt, 10-man RHIB.

== Upgrades ==
Upon entry with the Philippine Navy, additional refits were made to replace the four (4) 7.62mm machine guns with two (2) .50 caliber heavy machine guns and two 20 mm Mk.16 cannons. There are plans to add anti-ship missiles to the ships, but due to top-weight problems, it would have to be a lightweight system such as Sea Skua, although no missiles have been ordered to date.

The Philippine Navy embarked on a 3-phase upgrade of the ships. Phase 1 involves the upgrade of the ship's command & control, surveillance, and fire control systems, and was awarded to British defense contractor QinetiQ. It involved the installation of a new MSI Defence DS-25 Seahawk AUTSIG mount with M242 Bushmaster 25mm naval gun, a new Fire Constrol System and Radamec's 1500 Series 2500 electro-optical tracking system (EOTS, Raytheon gyro compass, Sperry Marine Naval BridgeMaster E Series Surface Search Radar, GPS, anemometer, and EM logs. All these were integrated with the ship's existing systems. The Phase 1 upgrade was completed in 2005.

The Phase 2 is the Marine Engineering Upgrade Program, which includes the repair and remediation of the hull, overhaul and improvement of the Main Propulsion including control and monitoring systems, electrical plant, auxiliary systems, outfitting and hull furnishings and training the navy crew in the operation and maintenance of the new plant. The tendering process for the ship's Phase 2 upgrades has commenced as of November 2013 as was allocated a budget of Php 216 million.

Phase 3 was originally a Service Life Extension Program (SLEP). But this was later changed to Combat System Alignment project to improve the combat capability of the patrol vessels. It involves replacing the existing EO/IR and fire control system with a newer system and a Command and Control (C2) module, repairing the 76mm Oto Melara Compact and 25mm Bushmaster gun on MSI Defence Seahawk mount, and other relevant upgrades.

The JCPV Phase 3A Combat Systems Upgrade project was awarded to Ultra Electronics, which installed their Fire Control System and Series 1700 electro-optical targeting system, and the Kelvin Hughes Sharpeye X-band surface search surveillance radar.

The ship will undergo further dock works, as it would then be having drydock repairs and repowering works.

== Gallery ==
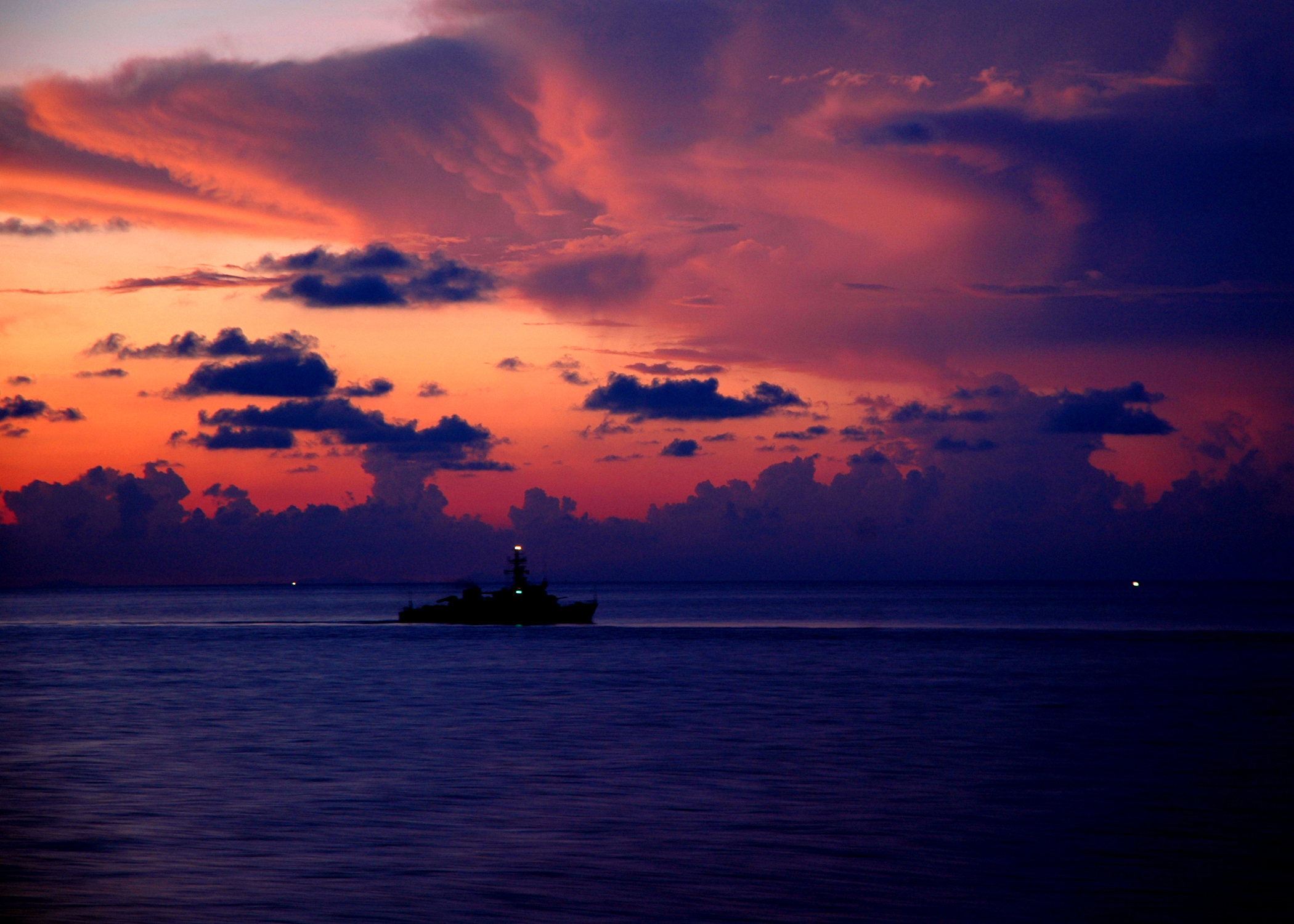
Taken during CARAT 2008 off Palawan 31 May 2008

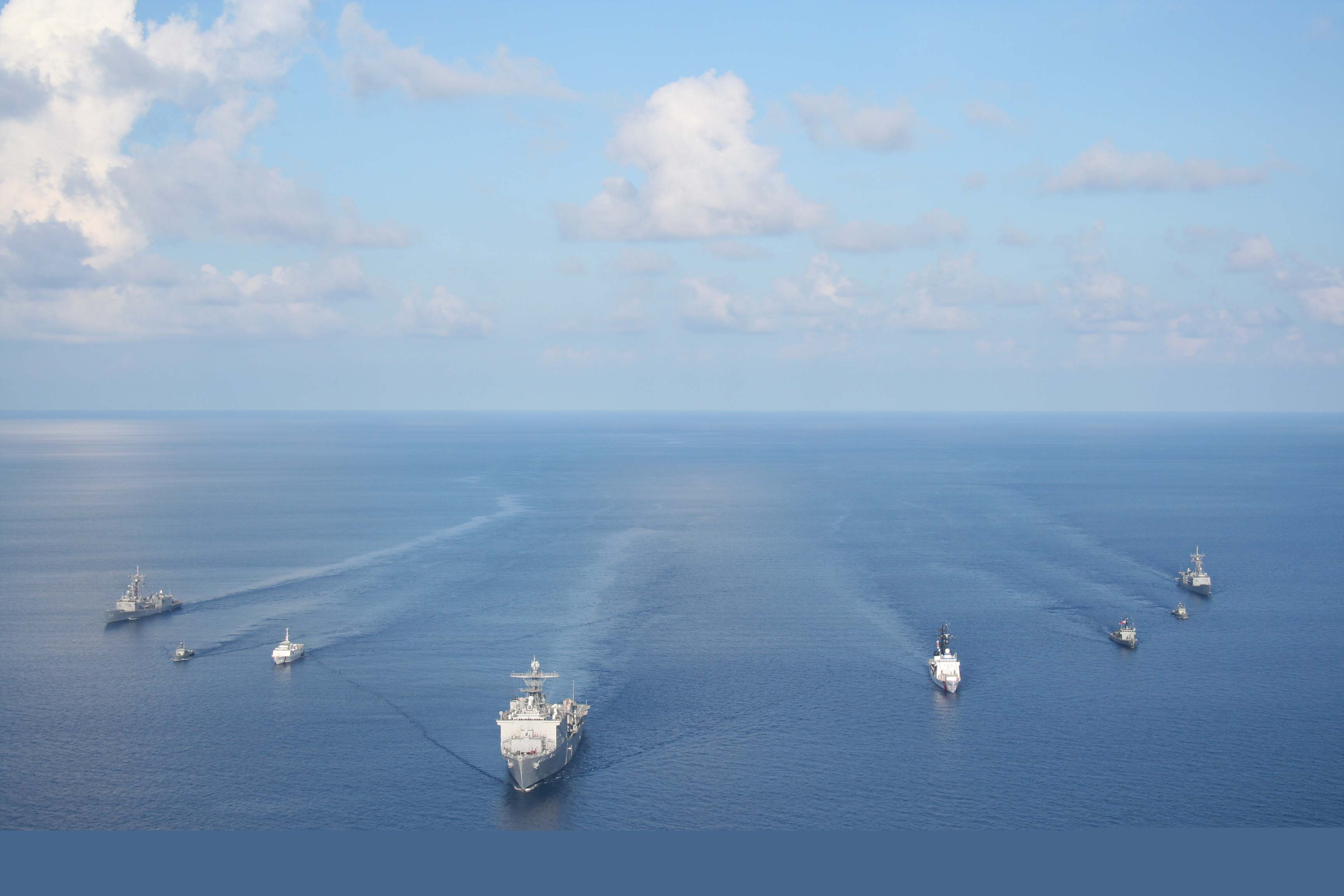
Taken during CARAT 2008 off Palawan 31 May 2008. Artemio Ricarte is the 3rd ship from the right.

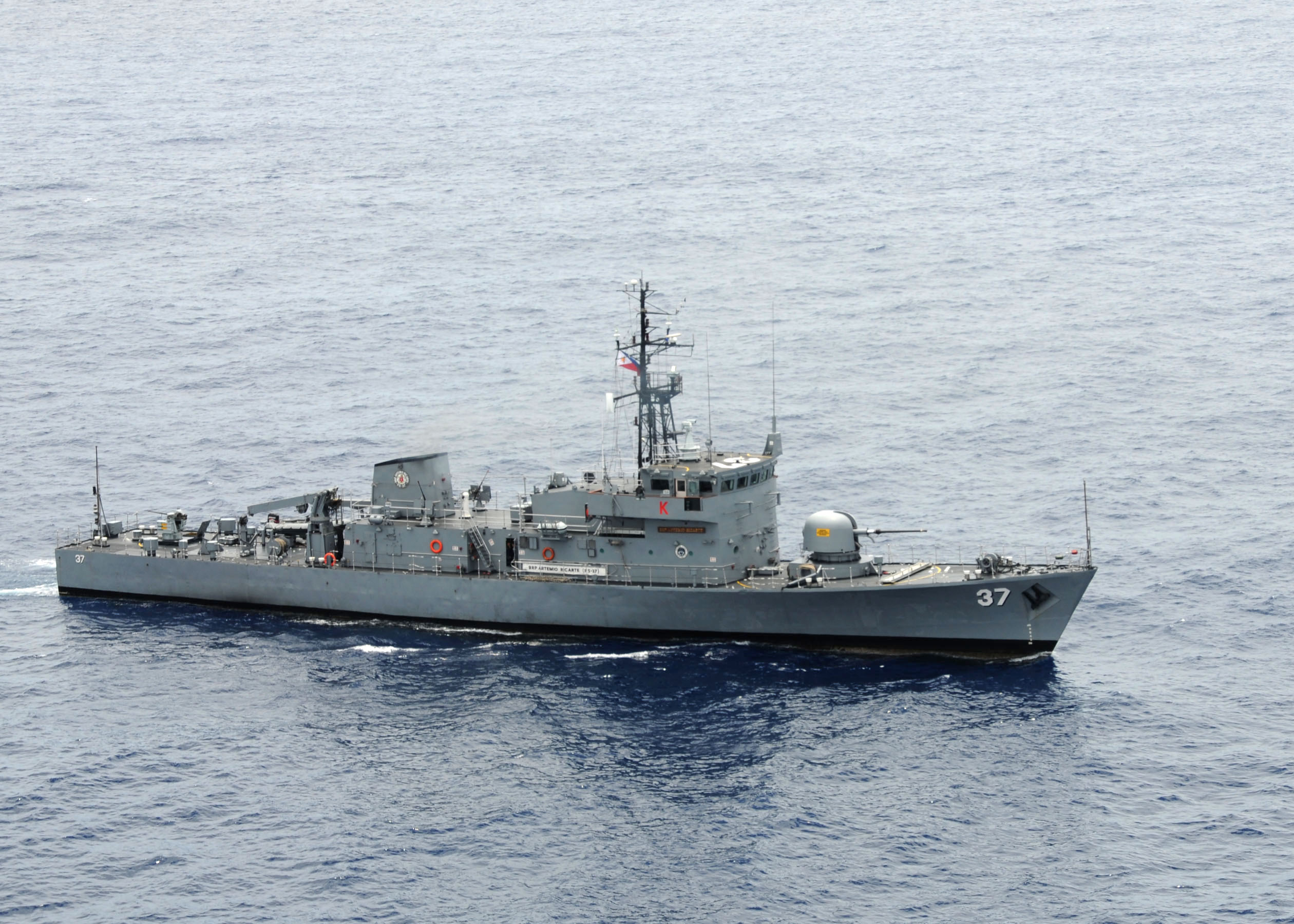
Artemio Ricarte at Balikatan 2009 exercises, April 21, 2009.

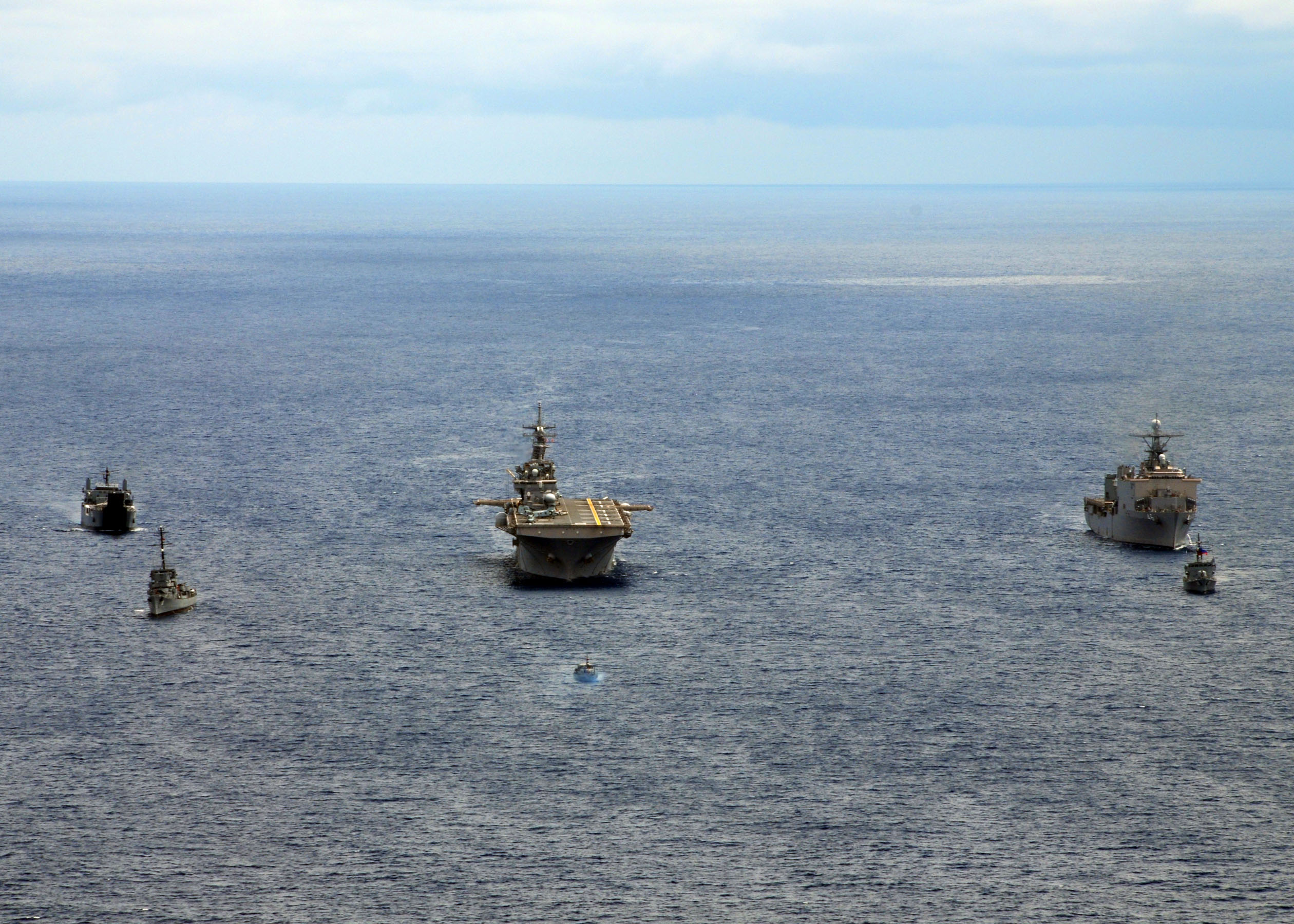
Artemio Ricarte, together with Philippine & U.S. Navy ships during naval phase of Balikatan 2009 bi-lateral exercises held in April 2009.

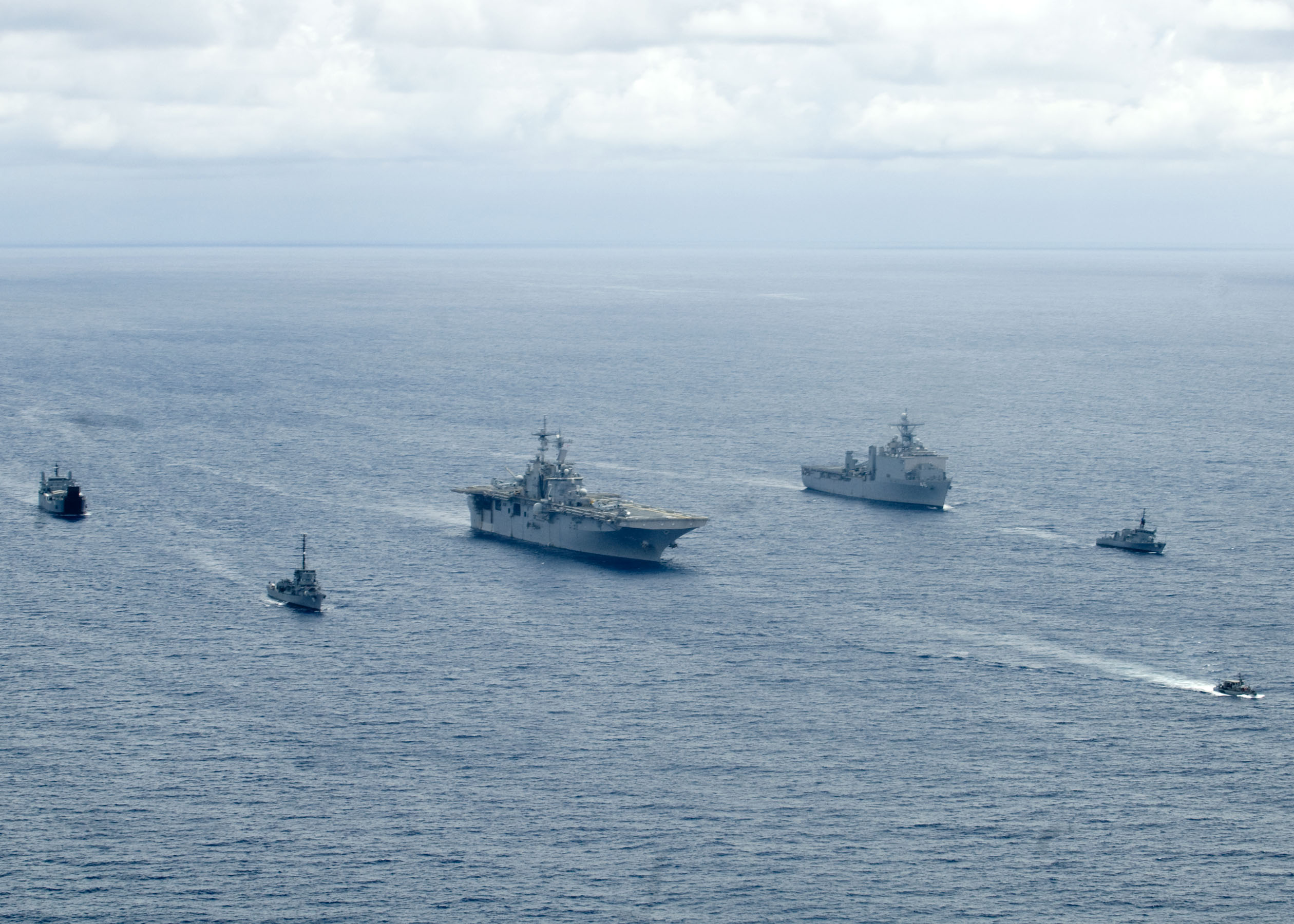
Artemio Ricarte during naval phase of Balikatan 2009 bi-lateral exercises, April 2009.

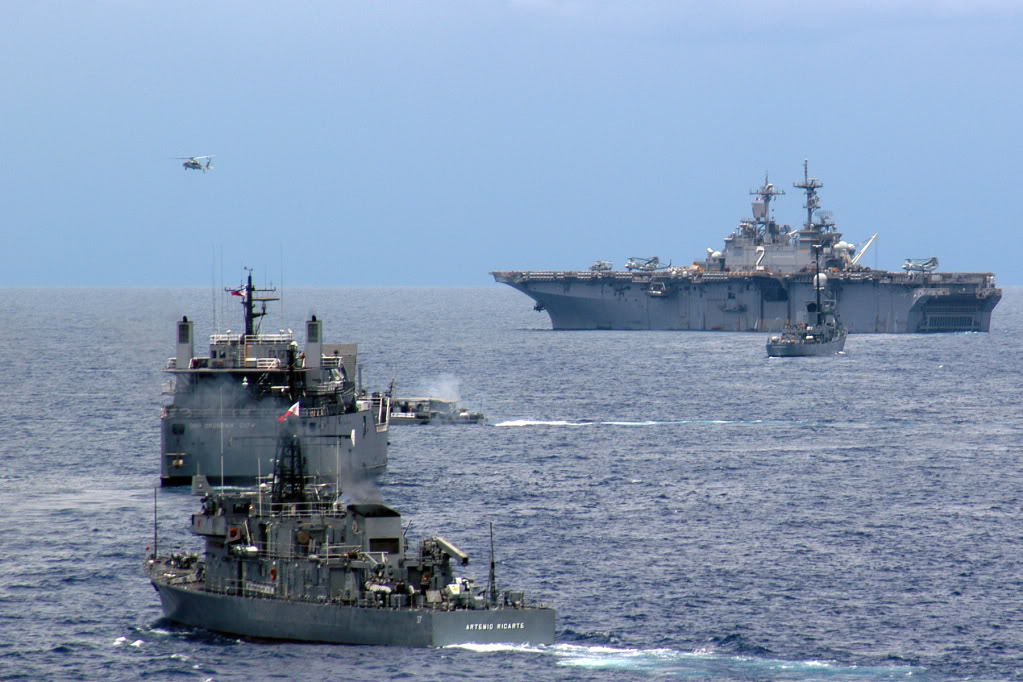
The forward-deployed amphibious assault ship USS Essex (LHD 2) leads ships formation during photo exercise (PHOTOEX) with Philippines Navy ships during Balikatan 2009 (BK09).

== See also ==
- List of ships of the Philippine Navy
