= Jacinto-class patrol vessel =

1982 class of Royal Navy corvettes

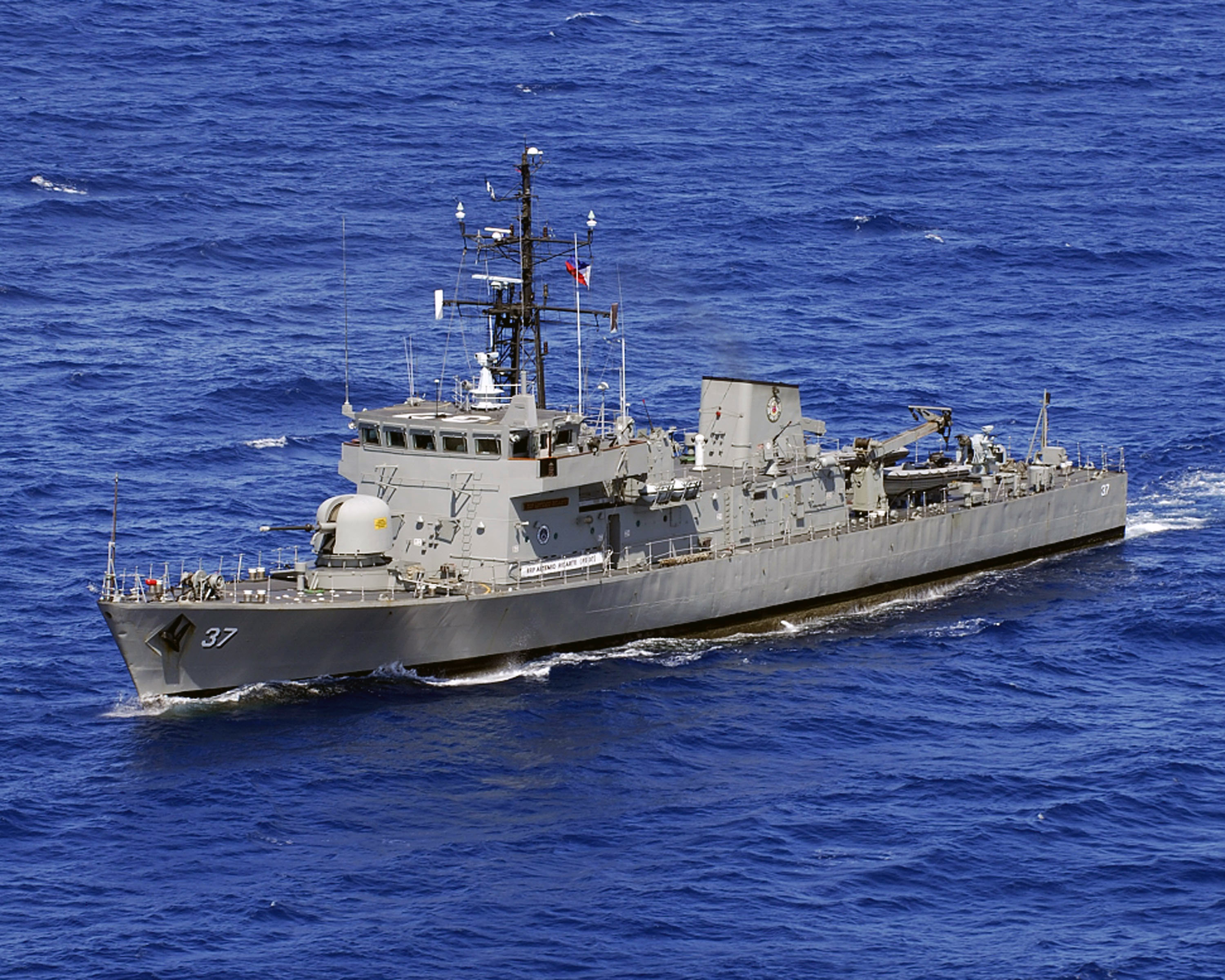
- BRP Artemio Ricarte, a Jacinto-class patrol vessel

Class overview
- Name: Jacinto class
- Builders: Hall, Russell & Company
- Operators: Philippine Navy
- Preceded by: Rizal-class corvette
- Succeeded by: Rajah Sulayman-class offshore patrol vessel
- Built: 1982
- In commission: 1997 – present
- Active: 3

General characteristics
- Type: Offshore Patrol Vessel
- Displacement: 712 tons full load; 664 tons standard
- Length: 205.4 ft (62.6 m)
- Beam: 32.8 ft (10.0 m)
- Draft: 8.9 ft (2.7 m)
- Installed power: 3 × CAT 3406C diesel generators each producing 465 bhp (347 kW)
- Propulsion: 2 × APE-Crossley SEMT-Pielstick 18 PA6 V 280 Diesel engines; 2 × shafts; 1 × Schottel S103 LSVEST drop-down, shrouded loiter retractable propeller, 181 shp (135 kW)
- Speed: 25 knots (46 km/h) (sustained); >28 knots (52 km/h) (max)
- Range: 2,500 nmi (4,600 km) at 17 knots (31 km/h)
- Boats & landing craft carried: 2 × Avon Searaider 5.4m 30 knots (56 km/h) 10-man Semi-rigid boat aft
- Complement: 31
- Sensors & processing systems: Hull 35: 9LV Mk4 Compact Combat Management System by Saab; Sea Eagle X & S bands Surface Search & Navigation Radars by GEM Elettronica; EOS-500 Electro-Optical Tracking/Fire Control System by Saab; Hull 36 & 37: Ultra Electronics Fire Control System; Sharpeye™ X & S-band Surface Search & Navigation Radars by Kelvin Hughes; Series-1700 Electro-Optical Tracking System by Ultra Electronics
- Armament: 1 × OTO Melara 76/62C (Compact) 76mm/L62 DP autocannon; 1 × DS25 DefenceSeahawk 25mm cannon RCWS by MSI Defence Systems; 2 × Mk.16 20mm cannons on Mk.68 mount; 2 × M2 Browning 12.7mm (50cal) heavy machine guns
- Armor: Belted steel

The Jacinto-class offshore patrol vessels currently in service with the Philippine Navy are three ships formerly belonging to the Royal Navy's Hong Kong Squadron as Peacock-class corvettes until 1997. The ships have undergone combat, electronics, weapon, propulsion and hull upgrades, with the most recent upgrade completed in August 2019. These increased their capabilities compared to the original Peacock-class vessels.

== History ==
Launched as a series of five patrol vessels, the Peacock class were originally part of the Hong Kong Squadron of the Royal Navy. The ships were built by Hall Russell in the United Kingdom and were commissioned into Royal Navy service from 1983 to 1984. The class was designed specifically for patrol duties in Hong Kong waters. As well as "flying the flag" and providing a constant British naval presence in the region, they could also undertake a number of different roles including seamanship, navigation and gunnery training. In addition, they performed search-and-rescue duties for which they had facilities to carry divers (including a decompression chamber) and equipment to recover vessels and aircraft. They also worked with the Marine Department of the Hong Kong Police and with Customs & Excise in order to prevent the constant flow of illegal immigrants, narcotics and electronic equipment into the Colony.

Three of these ships – HMS Peacock (P239), HMS Plover (P240), and HMS Starling (P241) – were sold to the Philippines as a sign of goodwill, and were officially turned over to the Philippine Navy on 1 August 1997 when sovereignty over Hong Kong was transferred from the United Kingdom to the People's Republic of China.

== Technical details ==
The ships under this class are characterized by a low freeboard, an Oto Melara 76 mm gun turret located forward, a large single funnel stack amidships, and a crane and two rigid-hulled inflatable boats (RHIB) aft.

For the BRP Emilio Jacinto (PS-35), the ship has the Saab 9LV Mk4 Compact Combat Management System (CMS), which allows the integration of the ship's navigation, surveillance and combat systems. Meanwhile the BRP Apolinario Mabini (PS-36) and BRP Artemio Ricarte (PS-37) do not have a CMS although both ships use a Fire Control System from Ultra Electronics.

The Oto Melara 76 mm Compact DP (Dual Purpose) gun is the primary weapon and is mounted in a turret forward of the bridge. It has a range of up to 10 nautical miles (20 km) and can be used against ships, aircraft or ground targets. It is remotely controlled from within the Combat Information Center by the gunnery officer and has no crew within the turret itself. The gun can fire 80 rounds in 60 seconds from its ready magazine, and the ships can carry a total of 450 rounds.

The secondary weapon (located at the stern) is a M242 Bushmaster 25 mm cannon in an MSI Defense System DS-25 Seahawk A1 mount.

Both guns are automated and are integrated with the Saab 9LV CMS and Saab EOS-500 Electro-optical tracking system (EOTS) on PS-35, or the Ultra Electronics C2 and FCS, and Series 1700 EOTS on PS-36 and PS-37.

The Saab EOS-500 and Ultra Electronics Series 1700 EOTS replaced the Radamec 1500 Series 2500 installed by the PN in 2005, which in turn replaced the older GSA7 Sea Archer Mk 1 electro-optical director with a GEC V3800 thermal imager added in 1987.

In addition to the abovementioned guns, these ships also carry two 12.7 mm 50 caliber heavy machine guns at the bridgewings, two 20 mm Mark 16 guns on Mk.68 mounts at midships, and two 50 mm rocket flare projectors.

The ships are powered by two APE-Crossley SEMT-Pielstick diesels (14,188 bhp combined) driving two three-bladed propellers. It has a drop down loiter engine with a shrouded prop of 181 bhp (135 kW) used to keep station and save fuel. The main engines can propel the 664 ton (712 tons full load) ship at over 28 knots (52 km/h), with a sustained speed of 25 knots (46 km/h). Its range is 2,500 nautical miles (4,630 km) at 17 knots (31 km/h).

These patrol vessels were specifically designed for Asian service, having air-conditioned crew spaces and have been designed to stay at sea during typhoons and other strong weather anomalies common to Asian seas. The ships were modified soon after entering the Royal Navy service with deeper bilge keels to alleviate a propensity to roll during moderate and heavy seas.

Each ship carries two Avon Searaider 5.4-metre (18 ft), 30-knot (56 km/h; 35 mph), 10-man RHIB.

== Upgrades ==
Upon entry with the Philippine Navy, additional refits were made to replace the four (4) 7.62mm machine guns with two (2) .50 caliber heavy machine guns and two 20 mm Mk.16 cannons. There are plans to add anti-ship missiles to the ships, but due to top-weight problems, it would have to be a lightweight system such as Sea Skua, although no missiles have been ordered to date.

Phase 1 involves the upgrade of the ship's command & control, surveillance, and fire control systems, and was awarded to British defense contractor QinetiQ. It involved the installation of a new MSI Defence DS-25 Seahawk A1 AUTSIG mount with M242 Bushmaster 25mm naval gun, a new Fire Control System and Radamec's 1500 Series electro-optical tracking system (EOTS), Raytheon gyro compass, Sperry Marine Naval BridgeMaster E Series Surface Search Radar, GPS, anemometer, and EM logs. All these were integrated with the ship's existing systems. The Phase 1 upgrade was completed in 2005.

Phase 2 is the Marine Engineering Upgrade Program, which includes the repair and remediation of the hull, overhaul and improvement of the main propulsion including control and monitoring systems, electrical plant, auxiliary systems, outfitting and hull furnishings and training the crew in the operation and maintenance of the new plant.

Phase 3 was originally a Service Life Extension Program (SLEP). But this was later changed to Combat System Alignment project to improve the combat capability of the patrol vessels. It involves replacing the existing EO/IR and fire control system with a newer system and a Command and Control (C2) module, repairing the 76mm Oto Melara Compact and 25mm Bushmaster gun on MSI Defence Seahawk mount, and other relevant upgrades.

The project was divided to Phase 3A involving 2 ships (PS-35 and PS-36, later changed to PS-36 and PS-37) and the refurbishment of 3 MSI Seahawk gun mounts, while Phase 3B involves 1 ship (PS-37, later change to PS-35).

The Phase 3A Combat Systems Alignment project was awarded to Ultra Electronics, which installed the Ultra Electronics Fire Control System and Series 1700 electro-optical targeting system, and the Kelvin Hughes Sharpeye X-band surface search surveillance radar.

The Phase 3B Combat Systems Alignment Project was awarded to Propmech Corporation-Saab AB Joint Venture, which installed the Saab 9LV Mk.4 Compact Combat Management System (CMS), Saab EOS-500 electro-optical targeting system and the GEM Elettronica Sea Eagle X-band surface search surveillance radar.

== Ships in class ==
Ship name	Hull number	Launched	Commissioned	Service	Status
BRP Emilio Jacinto	PS-35	1 December 1982	4 August 1997	Offshore Combat Force	Active
BRP Apolinario Mabini	PS-36	12 April 1983	4 August 1997	Offshore Combat Force	Active
BRP Artemio Ricarte	PS-37	7 September 1983	4 August 1997	Offshore Combat Force	Active

== Gallery ==
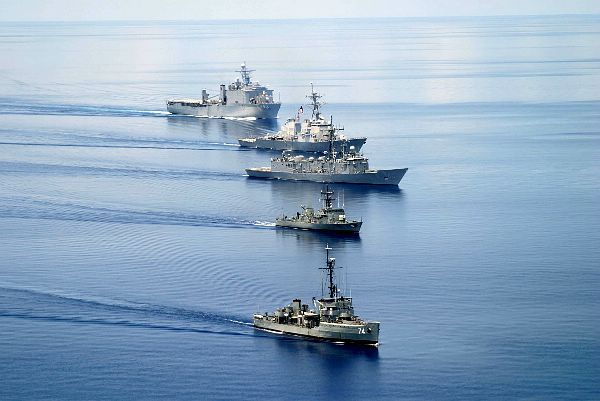
BRP Emilio Jacinto (PS-35) and BRP Rizal (PS-74) representing the Philippine Navy together at a CARAT exercise with the US Navy

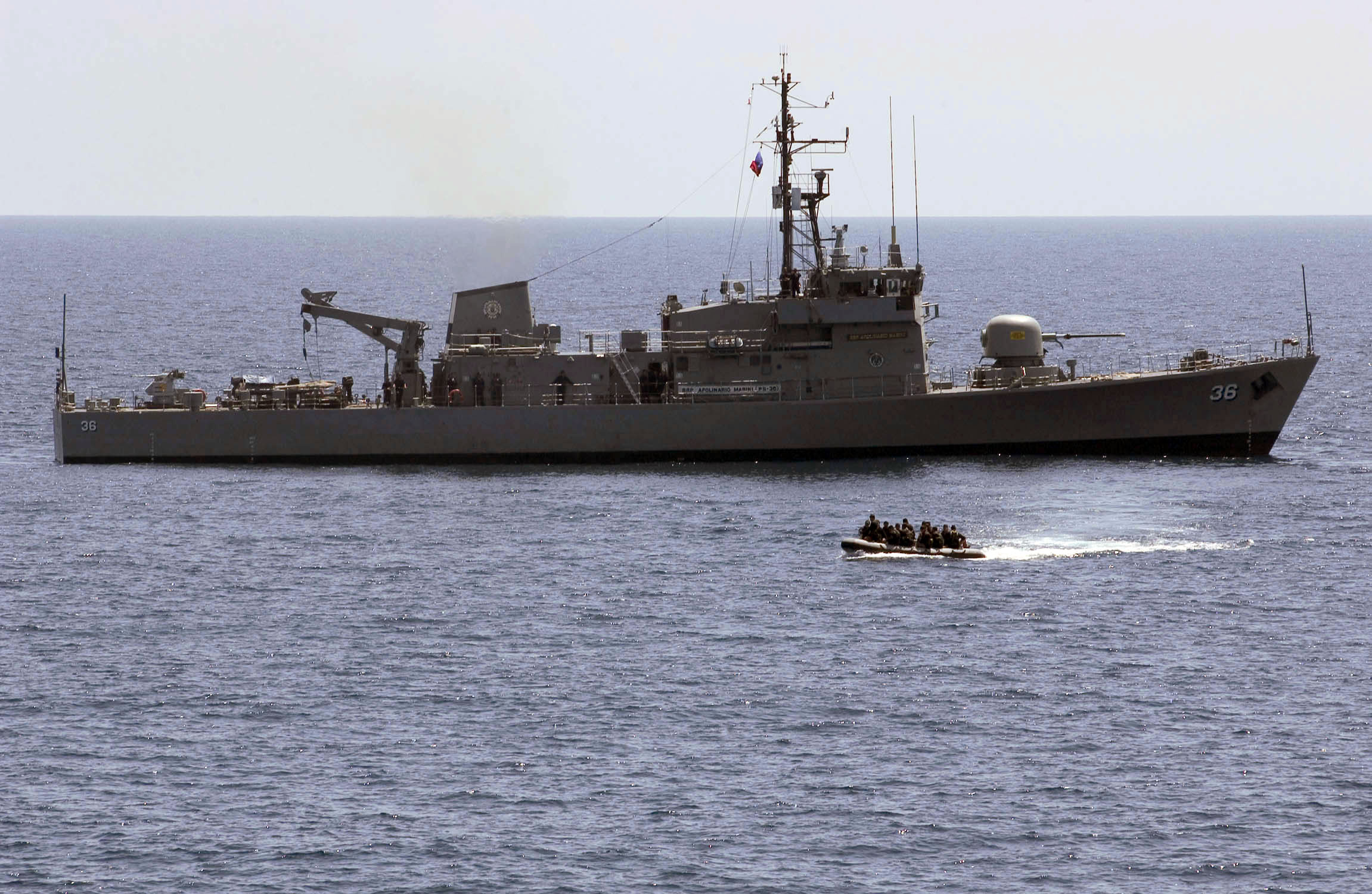
BRP Apolinario Mabini (PS-36) conducting SEAL delivery exercises

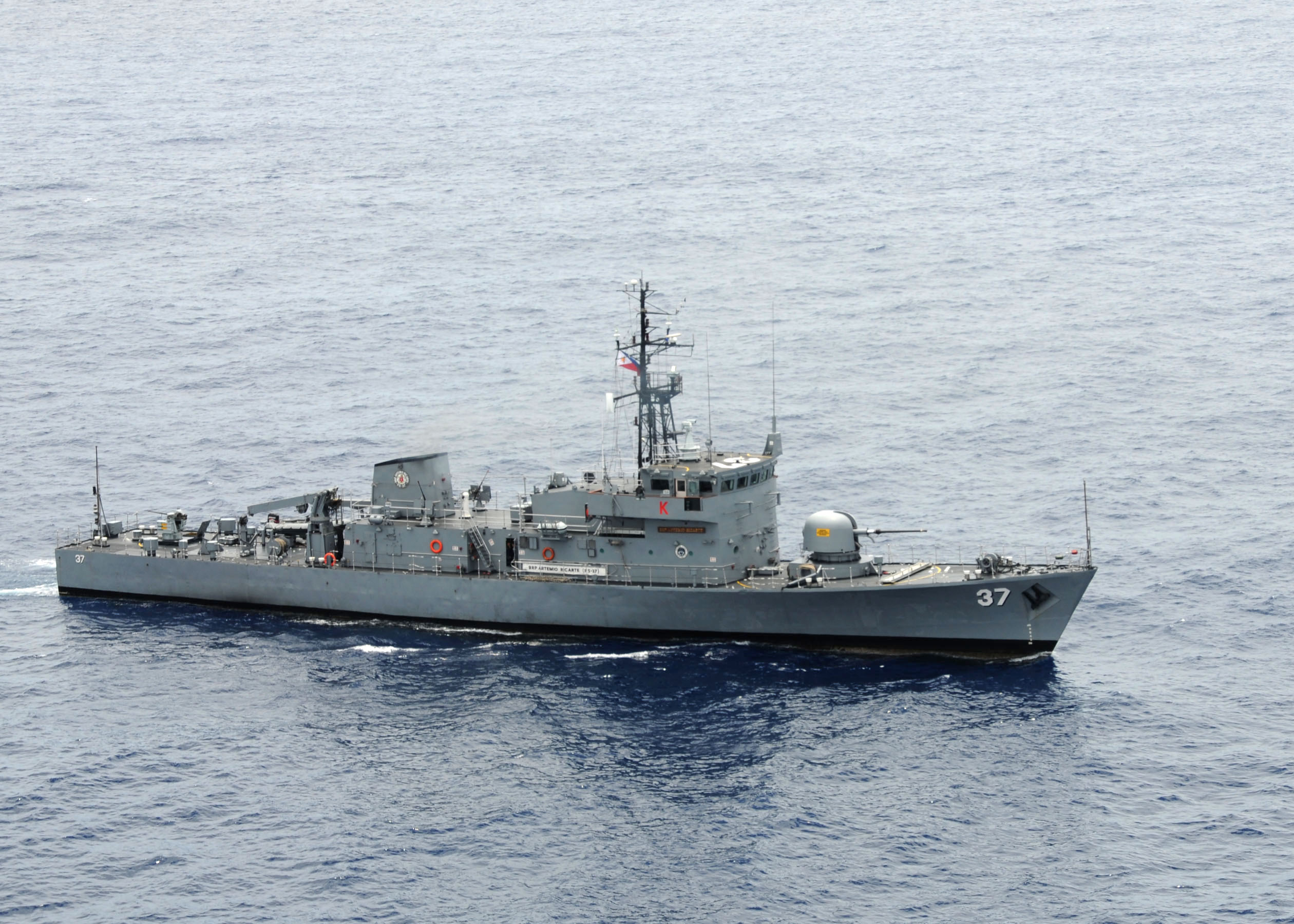
BRP Artemio Ricarte (PS-37) at Balikatan 2009 exercises.

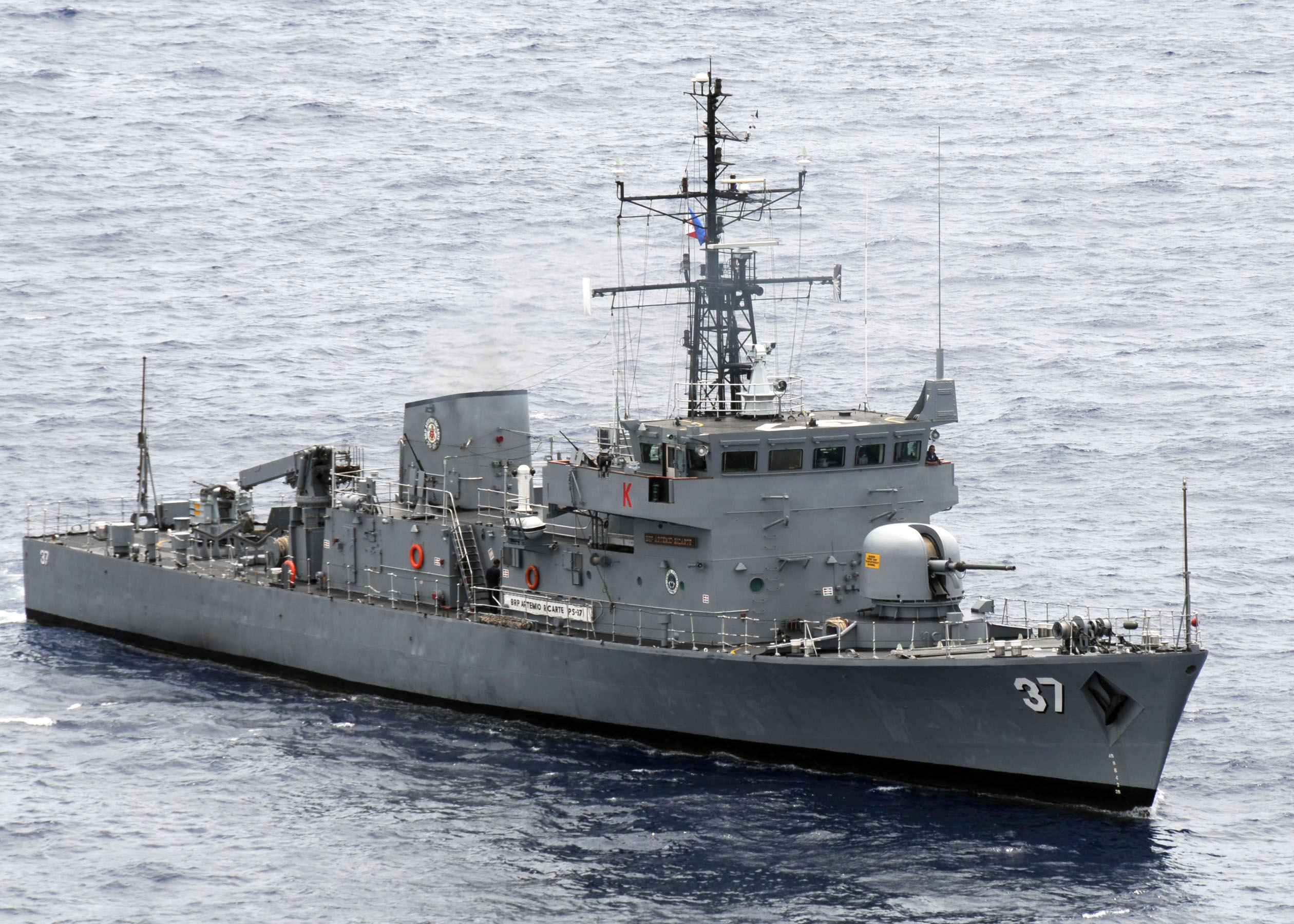
BRP Artemio Ricarte (PS-37) on April 21, 2009

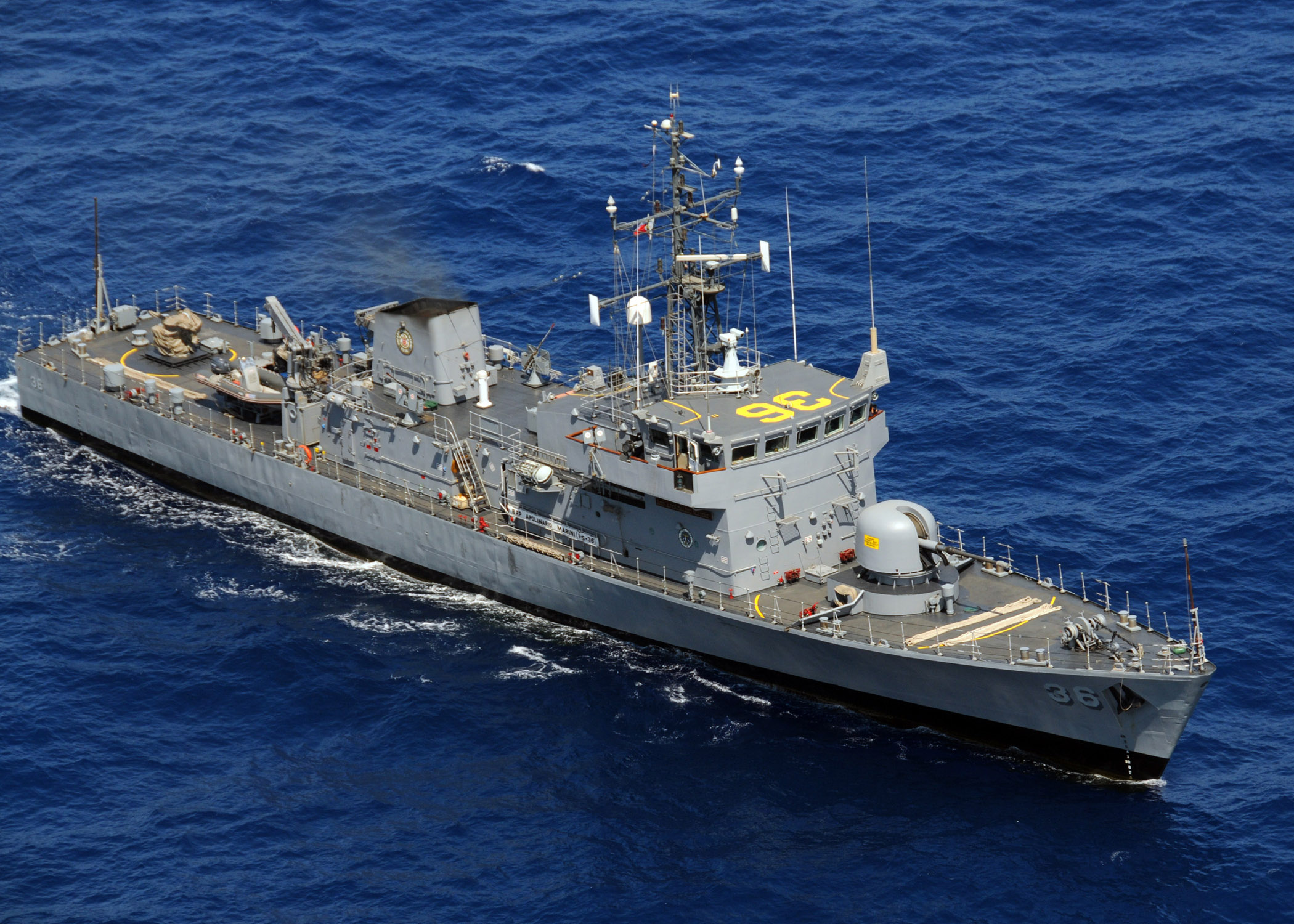
BRP Apolinario Mabini (PS-36) at Balikatan 2010 exercises.

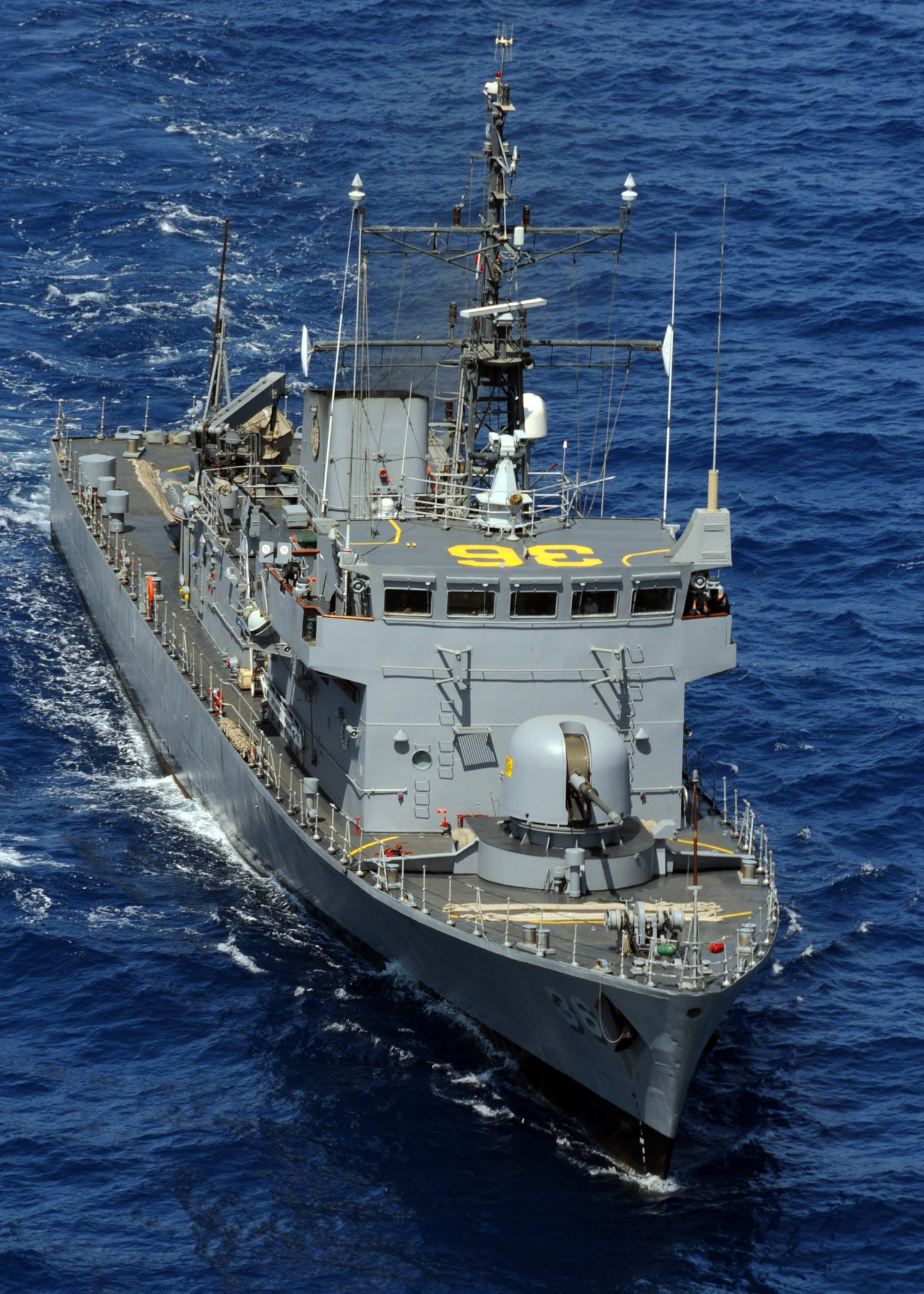
BRP Apolinario Mabini (PS-36) at Balikatan 2010 exercises.
