= BRP Apolinario Mabini =

Philippine and British naval corvette

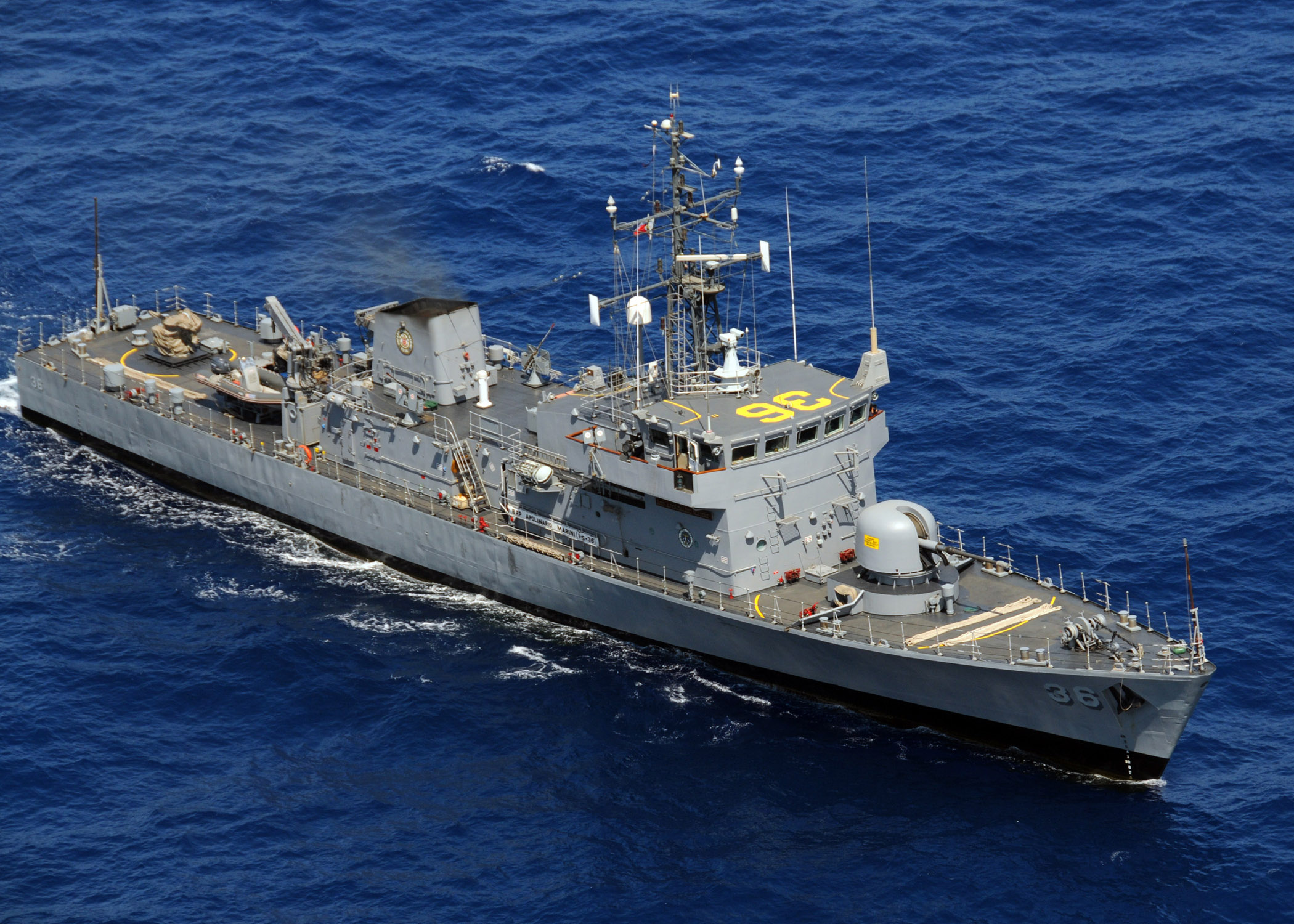
- BRP Apolinario Mabini

History

United Kingdom
- Name: Plover
- Builder: Hall, Russell & Company, Aberdeen
- Laid down: 1982
- Launched: 12 April 1983
- Commissioned: 1984
- Decommissioned: 1 August 1997
- Fate: Transferred to Philippine Navy in 1997.
- Badge

Philippines
- Name: Apolinario Mabini
- Namesake: Apolinario Mabini (1864–1903), was a Filipino theoretician who wrote the constitution for the first Philippine republic of 1899–1901, and served as its first prime minister in 1899.
- Operator: Philippine Navy
- Acquired: 1 August 1997
- Commissioned: 4 August 1997
- Nickname(s): Apomabs
- Status: in active service
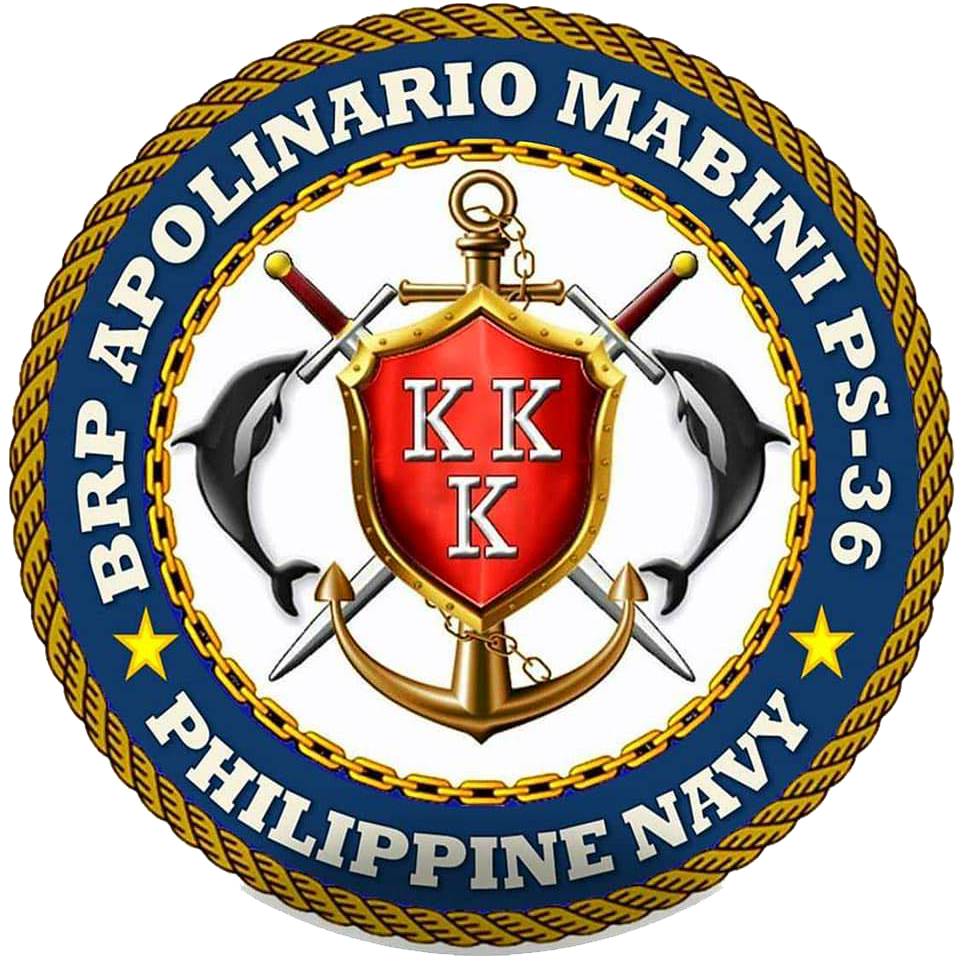
- Badge

General characteristics
- Class & type: Jacinto-class patrol corvette
- Displacement: 763 tons full load
- Length: 205.4 ft (62.6 m)
- Beam: 32.8 ft (10.0 m)
- Draft: 8.9 ft (2.7 m)
- Installed power: 3 × CAT 3406C diesel generators each producing 465 bhp (347 kW)
- Propulsion: 2 × APE-Crossley SEMT-Pielstick 18 PA6 V 280 Diesel engines producing 14,188 bhp (10,580 kW); 2 × shafts; 1 × Schottel S103 LSVEST drop-down, shrouded loiter retractable propeller, 181 shp
- Speed: 25 knots (46 km/h; 29 mph) (sustained speed)
- Range: 2,500 nautical miles (4,600 km; 2,900 mi) at 17 knots (31 km/h; 20 mph)
- Boats & landing craft carried: 2 × Avon Searaider 5.4 m, 30 kn. 10-man semi-rigid boat aft
- Complement: 31
- Sensors & processing systems: Ultra Electronics Fire Control System; Kelvin Hughes Sharpeye X & S-band Surface Search & Navigation Radars; Ultra Electronics Series 1700 Electro-Optical Tracking System
- Armament: 1 × Oto Melara 76 mm/62 cal. Compact gun; 1 × MSI DS25 25 mm naval gun; 2 × 20 mm Mk 16 cannons on Mk 68 mount; 2 × 12.7 mm/.50 cal. M2 machine guns
- Armor: Belted steel

BRP Apolinario Mabini (PS-36) is the second ship of the Jacinto-class patrol vessels currently assigned to the Offshore Combat Force of the Philippine Fleet. She is one of few ships in the Philippine Navy equipped with modern systems after the completion of combat, navigation and weapon systems upgrade of her class in August 2019. She is named after Apolinario Mabini, a hero of the Philippine revolution and a former prime minister. She was originally called HMS Plover (P240) during her service with the Royal Navy.

== History ==
HMS Plover

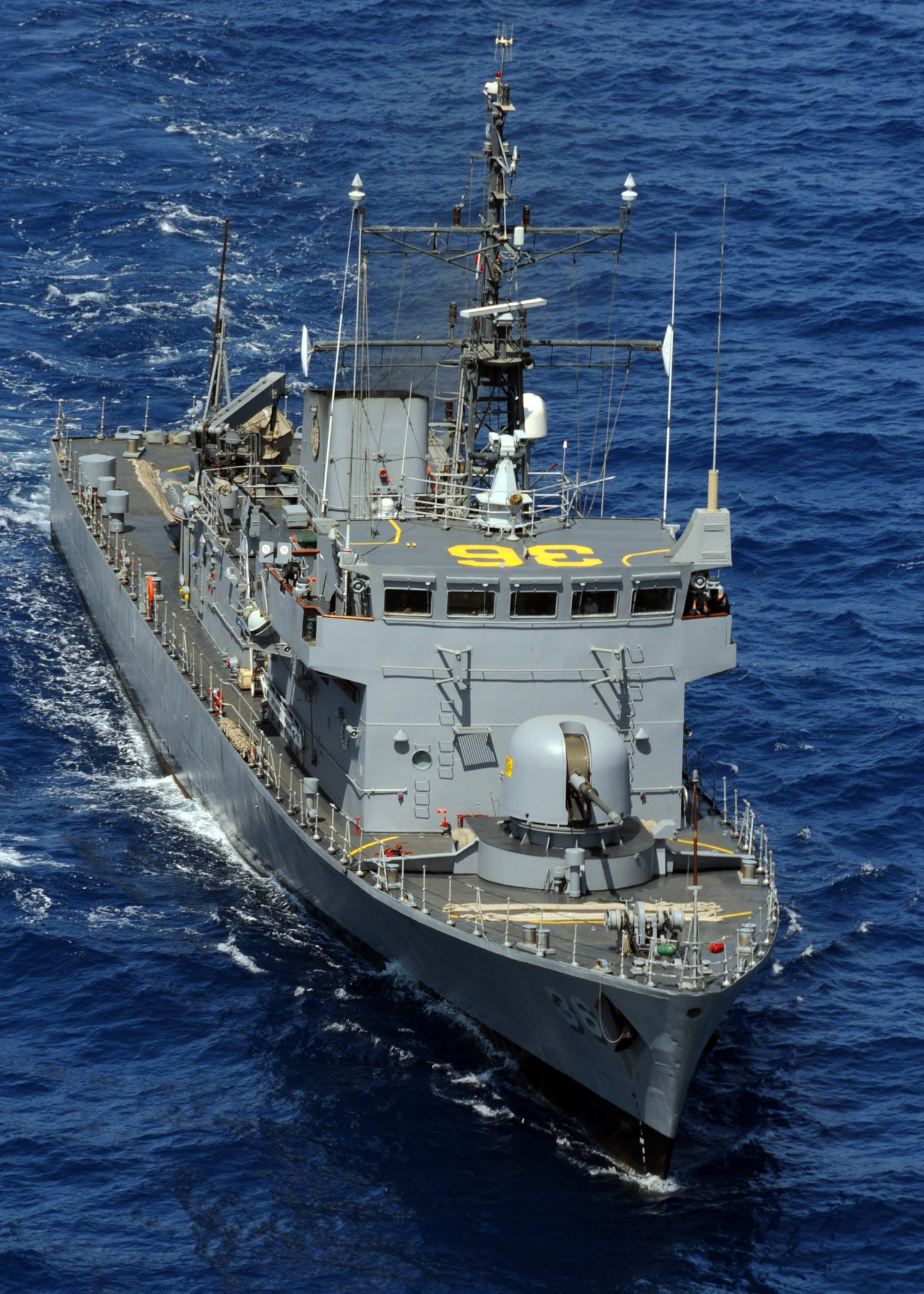
Apolinario Mabini at Balikatan 2010

Launched as the second of five patrol vessels of the Peacock class, she was originally part of the Hong Kong Squadron of the Royal Navy. The ships were built by Hall, Russell & Company in the United Kingdom and were commissioned into Royal Navy service from 1983 to 1984. The class was designed specifically for patrol duties in Hong Kong waters. As well as ‘flying the flag’ and providing a constant naval presence in region, they could undertake a number of different roles including seamanship, navigation and gunnery training and search-and-rescue duties for which they had facilities to carry divers (including a decompression chamber) and equipment to recover vessels and aircraft. They also worked with the Marine Department of the Hong Kong Police and with Customs & Excise in order to prevent the constant flow of illegal immigrants, narcotics and electronic equipment into the colony.

Out of the five ships in its class, three of them, Peacock, Plover and Starling, were left in Hong Kong until 1997. They were sold to the Philippines, and were officially turned over to the Philippine Navy on 1 August 1997 when Hong Kong was ceded back to China.

== Technical details ==
The ships under this class are characterized by a low freeboard, an Oto-Melara 76 mm gun turret located forward, large funnel amidships and a crane and rigid-hulled inflatable boat aft.

The Oto Melara 76 mm Compact DP (Dual Purpose) gun is the primary weapon and is mounted in a turret forward of the bridge. It has a range of up to 10 nautical miles (20 km) and can be used against ships, aircraft or ground targets. It is remotely controlled from within the Combat Information Center by the gunnery officer and has no crew within the turret itself. The gun can fire 80 rounds in 60 seconds from its ready magazine, and the ships can carry a total of 450 rounds.

The secondary weapon (located at the stern) is a M242 Bushmaster 25 mm cannon in an MSI Defense System DS-25 Seahawk A1 mount.

Both guns are automated and are integrated with the Ultra Electronics Fire Control System and Series 1700 Electro-optical tracking system (EOTS).

In addition to the abovementioned guns, these ships also carry two .50 caliber heavy machine guns at the bridgewings, and two 20 mm Mk.16 cannons on Mk.68 mounts at the midships.

The Ultra Electronics Series 1700 EOTS replaced the Radamec 1500 Series 2500 installed by the PN in 2005, which in turn replaced the older GSA7 Sea Archer Mk 1 electro-optical director with a GEC V3800 thermal imager added in 1987.

The ships are powered by two APE-Crossley SEMT-Pielstick diesels (14,188 bhp combined) driving two three-bladed propellers. It has a drop down loiter engine with a shrouded prop of 181 bhp (135 kW) used to keep station and save fuel. The main engines can propel the 664 ton (712 tons full load) ship at over 28 knots (52 km/h), with a sustained speed of 25 knots (46 km/h). Its range is 2,500 nautical miles (4,630 km) at 17 knots (31 km/h).

These corvettes were specifically designed for Asian service, having air-conditioned crew spaces and have been designed to stay at sea during typhoons and other weather common to Asian seas. The ships were modified soon after entering Royal Navy service with deeper bilge keels to alleviate a propensity to roll during moderate and heavy seas.

The ship also carries two Avon Searaider 5.4 m, 30 kt, 10-man RHIB.

== Notable deployments ==
The Apolinario Mabini together with Gregorio del Pilar and Emilio Jacinto are the naval vessels that the AFP Western Command sent to help in the searching efforts for Malaysia Airlines Flight 370.

== Upgrades ==
Upon entry with the Philippine Navy, additional refits were made to replace the four (4) 7.62mm machine guns with two (2) .50 caliber heavy machine guns and two 20 mm Mk.16 cannons. There are plans to add anti-ship missiles to the ships, but due to top-weight problems, it would have to be a lightweight system such as Sea Skua, although no missiles have been ordered to date.

The Philippine Navy embarked on a 3-phase upgrade of the ships. Phase 1 involves the upgrade of the ship's command & control, surveillance, and fire control systems, and was awarded to British defense contractor QinetiQ. It involved the installation of a new MSI Defence DS-25 Seahawk AUTSIG mount with M242 Bushmaster 25mm naval gun, a new Fire Control System and Radamec's 1500 Series electro-optical tracking system (EOTS, Raytheon gyro compass, Sperry Marine Naval BridgeMaster E Series Surface Search Radar, GPS, anemometer, and EM logs. All these were integrated with the ship's existing systems. The Phase 1 upgrade was completed in 2005.

Phase 2 is the marine engineering upgrade program, which includes the repair and remediation of the hull, overhaul and improvement of the main propulsion including control and monitoring systems, electrical plant, auxiliary systems, outfitting and hull furnishings and training the navy crew in the operation and maintenance of the new plant.

Phase 3 was originally a Service Life Extension Program (SLEP). But this was later changed to Combat System Alignment project to improve the combat capability of the patrol vessels. It involves replacing the existing EO/IR and fire control system with a newer system and a Command and Control (C2) module, repairing the 76mm Oto Melara Compact and 25mm Bushmaster gun on MSI Defence Seahawk mount, and other relevant upgrades.

The JCPV Phase 3A Combat Systems Upgrade project was awarded to Ultra Electronics, which installed the Ultra Electronics Fire Control System and Series 1700 electro-optical targeting system, and the Kelvin Hughes Sharpeye X-band surface search surveillance radar.

The ship re-entered Philippine Navy service in May 2019 and was immediately deployed during the 121st founding anniversary celebrations of the Philippine Navy.

Apart from the upgrades, additional refits were made to replace the four 7.62mm machine guns with two .50 caliber heavy machine guns and two 20 mm Mk.16 cannons. There are plans to add anti-ship missiles to the ships, but due to top-weight problems, it would have to be a lightweight system such as Sea Skua, although no missiles have been ordered to date.

== Gallery ==
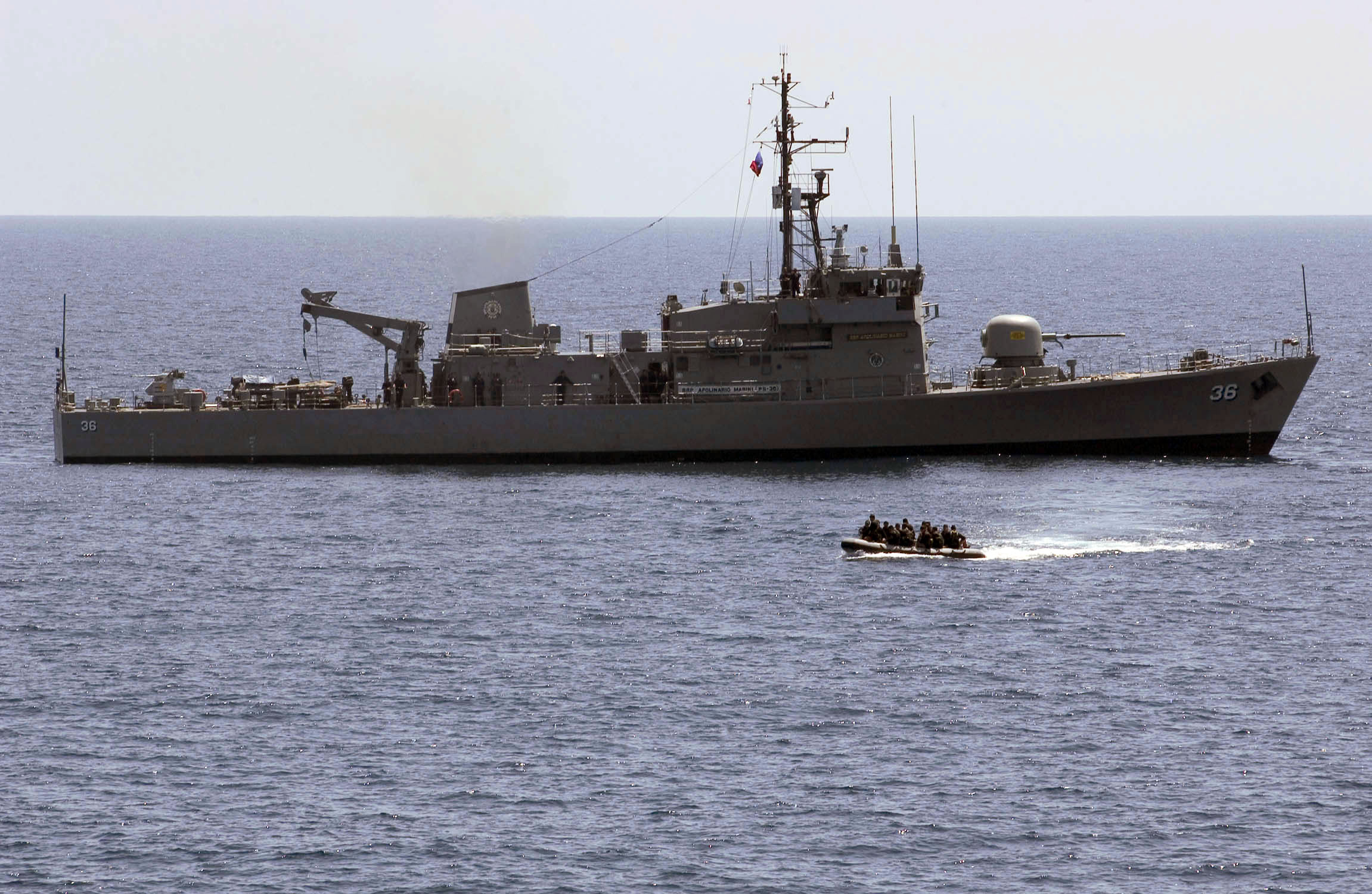
BRP Apolinario Mabini during SEACAT 2006 shipboarding exercises with USS Tortuga

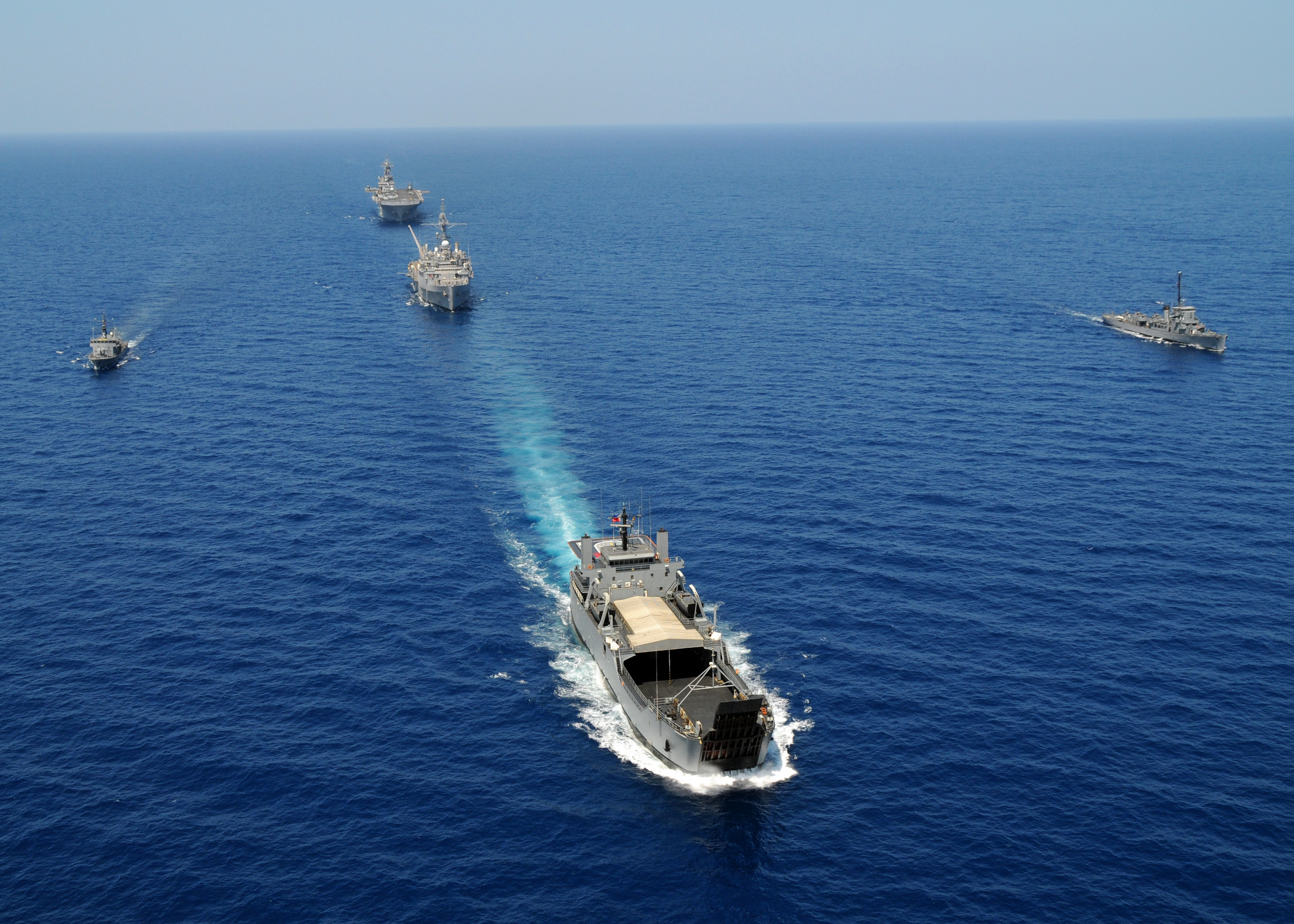
Apolinario Mabini (far left) with US and Philippine Navy ships at BK10 exercises

== See also ==
- List of ships of the Philippine Navy
