= Peacock-class corvette =

1982 class of British corvettes

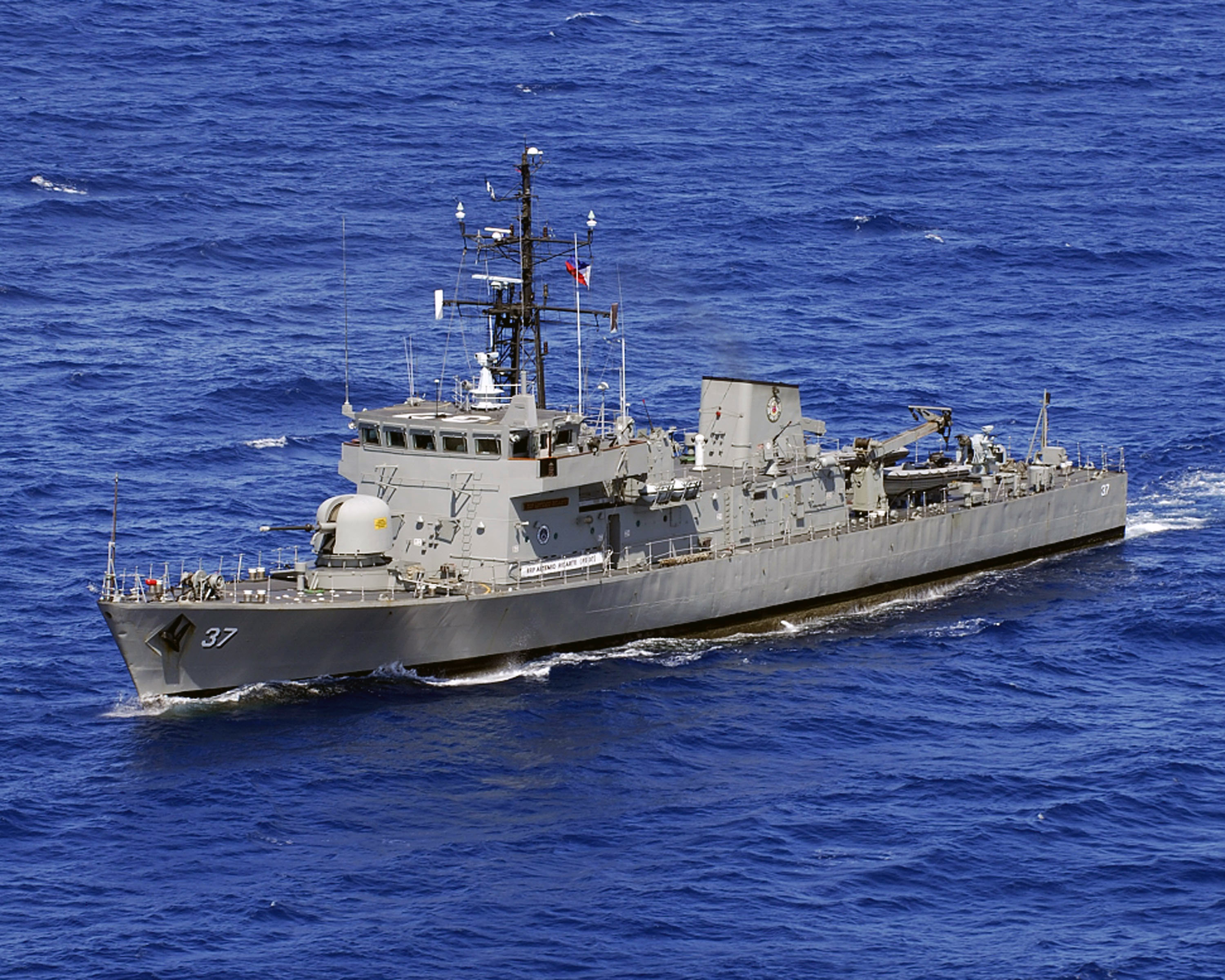
- BRP Artemio Ricarte (ex-HMS Starling)

Class overview
- Name: Peacock class
- Builders: Hall, Russell & Company, Aberdeen
- Operators: Royal Navy; Philippine Navy; Irish Naval Service
- Preceded by: Castle class
- Succeeded by: River class (United Kingdom); Lake class (Ireland)
- Subclasses: Jacinto class
- In commission: 1982 - present
- Completed: 5
- Active: Philippine Navy: 3; Irish Navy: 0

General characteristics
- Type: Corvette
- Displacement: 712 tons full load
- Length: 62.6 m (205 ft 5 in)
- Beam: 10 m (32 ft 10 in)
- Draught: 2.72 m (8 ft 11 in)
- Propulsion: 2 diesels, 2 shafts, 14,188 bhp (10,580 kW)
- Speed: 25 kn (46 km/h; 29 mph) sustained max speed
- Complement: 30 - 40
- Armament: 1 × Oto Melara 76 mm/62cal Compact gun; Irish Naval Service only: 2 × Rheinmetall Mk 20 RH-202 20 mm cannons; 2 × FN MAG 7.62 mm machine guns; Philippine Navy only: 1 × MSI DS25 25mm naval gun; 2 × 20 mm Mk 16 cannons on Mk 68 mount; 2 × 12.7 mm/.50cal M2 machine guns

The Peacock class is a class of patrol corvette built for the Royal Navy. Five were constructed, and by 1997 all had been sold to the Irish Naval Service or the Philippine Navy.

== Original use ==
The five ships of this class were originally part of the Hong Kong Squadron of the Royal Navy. The ships were built by Hall, Russell & Company of Aberdeen in the United Kingdom and were commissioned into Royal Navy service between 1983 and 1985. They were specifically built for service in Hong Kong with the 6th Patrol Craft Squadron; for work in tropical climates they were fully air conditioned and were capable of remaining at sea during typhoons. As well as ‘flying the flag’ and providing a constant naval presence in region, they could undertake a number of different roles including Seamanship, Navigation and Gunnery training and Search-and-Rescue duties for which they had facilities to carry divers (including a decompression chamber) and equipment to recover vessels and aircraft. They also worked with the Marine Department of the Royal Hong Kong Police Force and with Customs & Excise to decrease the constant flow of illegal immigrants, narcotics and electronic equipment into the colony. For these roles each vessel could carry two Avon Searider SR5M rigid-hulled inflatable boats and a small detachment of Royal Marines.

== Philippine Navy ==
HMS Peacock (P239), HMS Plover (P240), and HMS Starling (P241) were sold to the Philippines and were officially turned over to the Philippine Navy on 1 August 1997 after Hong Kong was returned to China. In Philippine service they are designated Emilio Jacinto-class corvettes, and have been considerably 'up-gunned' with a 25 mm M242 Bushmaster and two 20 mm Oerlikon guns.

The Philippine Navy undertook several phases of upgrades on the three corvettes, with the first one completed in 2005 replacing the old radar and navigation systems. The second upgrade involved the improvements on its marine engineering systems, and a third upgrade included the improvement of combat systems.

== Irish Naval Service ==
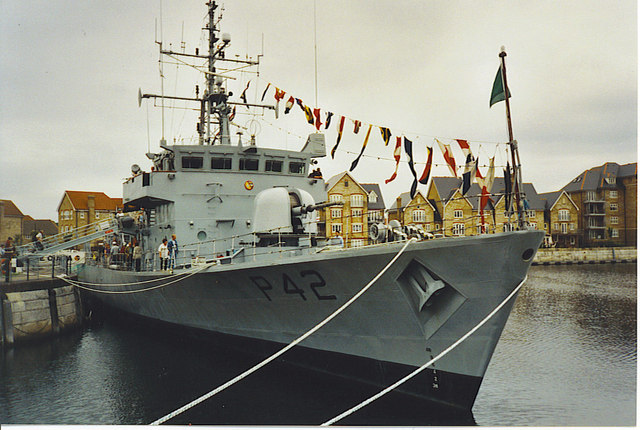
LÉ Ciara moored at St Mary's Island in Chatham in 2002

HMS Swallow (P242) and HMS Swift (P243) were both sold to the Irish Naval Service in 1988. They were respectively renamed as LÉ Ciara (P42) and LÉ Orla (P41), and were commissioned under their current names by the Taoiseach Charles Haughey on 16 January 1989.

The two ships take their names from traditional Irish mythology: Órla, a grand niece (great niece) of Brian Boru, the 11th-century High King of Ireland; and Ciara, a saint born in Tipperary around the year 611 AD. They replaced the three Ton-class minesweepers, the last of which the Irish Navy had recently retired before the delivery of the Peacock class.

The two ships were decommissioned on 8 July 2022 and were replaced by ex-HMNZS Lake-class inshore patrol vessels, ex Rotoiti (renamed LÉ Aoibhinn) and ex Pukaki (renamed LÉ Gobnait) in 2024. LÉ Ciara and LÉ Orla were scrapped by the Irish Department of Defense rather than sold to another country like the Philippine Navy. In April 2024 LÉ Orla and LÉ Ciara were towed together to Belgium for scrapping.

== Operators ==
- (Republic of Ireland) Irish Navy (ex-RN 1988–2022)
- (Philippines) Philippine Navy (ex-RN 1997–)
- (United Kingdom) Royal Navy (former 1982–1997)

== See also ==
- Emilio Jacinto-class corvette
- Osprey 55-class gunboat
