= Port of Tyne =

Commercial docks of the River Tyne

- Interactive map of Port of Tyne
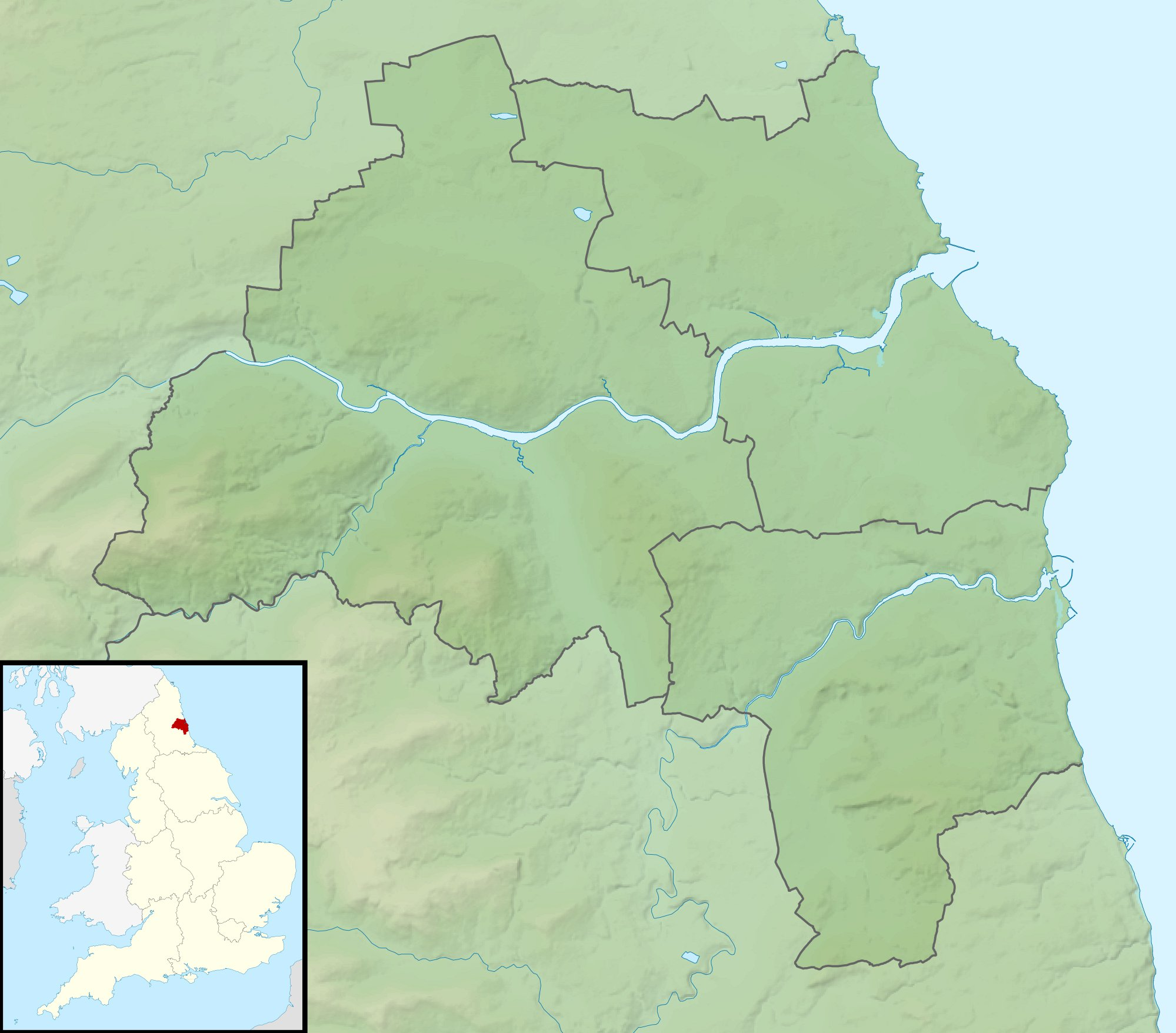
- Location in United Kingdom Tyne and Wear

Location
- Country: United Kingdom
- Location: Tyne and Wear
- Coordinates: 54.9855°N 1.4605°W
- UN/LOCODE: GBTYN

Details
- Owned by: Port of Tyne trust port
- Employees: 459
- Chief Executive Officer: Matt Beaton
- Harbour Master: Alan Feast

Statistics
- Annual cargo tonnage: 4.4 million tonnes
- Annual container volume: 66,000 TEU
- Passenger traffic: 748,000
- Annual revenue: £57.5 million
- Cars imported/exported: 526,000
- Website www.portoftyne.co.uk

The Port of Tyne comprises the commercial docks on and around the River Tyne in Tyne and Wear in the northeast of England.

== History ==
There has been a port on the Tyne at least since the Romans used their settlement of Arbeia to supply the garrison of Hadrian's Wall. Around 1200, stone-faced, clay-filled jetties began to project into the river in Newcastle, an indication that trade was increasing. As the Roman roads continued to deteriorate, sea travel gained in importance. By 1275 Newcastle was the sixth largest wool-exporting port in England. The principal exports at this time were wool, timber, coal, millstones, dairy produce, fish, salt, and hides. Much of the developing trade was with the Baltic countries and Germany. Coal was being exported from Newcastle by 1250, and by 1350 the burgesses received a royal licence to export coal. This licence to export coal was jealously guarded by the Newcastle burgesses, and they tried to prevent any one else on the Tyne from exporting coal except through Newcastle. The burgesses similarly tried to prevent fish from being sold anywhere else on the Tyne except Newcastle. This led to conflicts with Gateshead and South Shields.

=== Tyne Improvement Commission ===
River Tyne Improvement Act 1850
- Act of Parliament
- Parliament of the United Kingdom
- Long title: An Act for the Improvement and Regulation of the River Tyne and the Navigation thereof, and for other Purposes.
- Citation: 13 & 14 Vict. c. lxiii

Dates
- Royal assent: 15 July 1850

Text of statute as originally enacted

From 1600 the growth in the export of coal brought prosperity to Newcastle. Until the 19th century the port was the responsibility of the City of Newcastle, but navigation became difficult, and the Tyne Improvement Commission (TIC) was established by the River Tyne Improvement Act 1850 (13 & 14 Vict. c. lxiii) to better maintain the port and river. In 1881 they published a review of their achievements. One significant action was the removal by dredging of Kings Meadow Island. A major force through this period were the Keelmen.

The TIC deepened the river to 9.83 metres, and built the North and South Piers, and the Northumberland, Tyne and Albert Edward Docks. In 1928 the TIC opened the Tyne Commission Quay at North Shields, now known as the Northumbrian Quay, to handle mail and cargo trade with Bergen in Norway.

=== Port of Tyne Authority ===
In 1968 the TIC was dissolved and replaced by the Port of Tyne Authority, constituted by the Port of Tyne Reorganisation Scheme 1967 Confirmation Order 1968 (SI 1968/942). Since then, with the decline in the coal industry, the port has switched to the export of cars manufactured in the northeast of England.

== The port today ==
The Port of Tyne is the navigation authority for the tidal reaches of the River Tyne, from the mouth to the Tidal Stone at Wylam, a distance of 17 miles. It also has jurisdiction for one mile past the roundheads at the piers at the river mouth.

The port handles conventional and bulk cargoes at the Riverside Quay. There are two car terminals, one on either side of the river, a cruise terminal at Northumbrian Quay on the north side, and a ferry terminal at North Shields.

The Port of Tyne applied to become a freeport after the UK left the EU on 31 January 2020 but the application was rejected.

== Police ==
The Tyne Improvement Commission Docks and Piers Police was a police force maintained by the TIC from 1874 to police its property. Its officers were sworn as special constables under the Harbours, Docks and Piers Clauses Act 1847 and had full police powers on TIC property. The force was disbanded on 1 September 1949, although its members remained in the Commission's employment as Watchmen in the Traffic and Engineering Department. Policing on Commission property was taken over by the River Tyne Police.
