= Ports Act 1991 =

Act of the Parliament of the United Kingdom

Ports Act 1991 (Note: Section 42(1).)
- Act of Parliament
- Parliament of the United Kingdom
- Long title: An Act to provide for the transfer to companies of certain statutory port undertakings and for the disposal of securities of the companies; to provide for a levy on initial disposals of securities of any company receiving such a transfer or of rights to require the issue of such securities; to provide for a levy in respect of gains accruing to such a company on disposals of certain land or certain interests in land; to provide for the transfer of certain property, rights, liabilities and functions of the Port of London Authority to a company formed by that Authority and for the disposal of securities of the company; to amend the law with respect to lighthouses, buoys and beacons and the authorities responsible for them; and for connected purposes.
- Citation: 1991 c. 52
- Territorial extent: England and Wales; Scotland; Northern Ireland (section 41); (Note: Section 42(3).)

Dates
- Royal assent: 25 July 1991
- Commencement: 25 July 1991 (in part); 1 April 1993 (rest of act); (Note: Section 42(2). The Ports Act 1991 (Transfer of Local Lighthouses: Appointed Day) Order 1992 (SI 1992/2381).)
Other legislation
Amends	Finance Act 1989
Amended by	Taxation of Chargeable Gains Act 1992; Merchant Shipping Act 1995

Status: Amended

Text of statute as originally enacted

Revised text of statute as amended

Text of the Ports Act 1991 as in force today (including any amendments) within the United Kingdom, from legislation.gov.uk.

The Ports Act 1991 (c. 52) is an act of the Parliament of the United Kingdom intended to enable the privatisation of trust ports in the United Kingdom.

At the time of the passage of the act, there were 15 ports which could have been privatised.
