= Aberdeen Harbour =

Port on the north east coast of Scotland

Port of Aberdeen

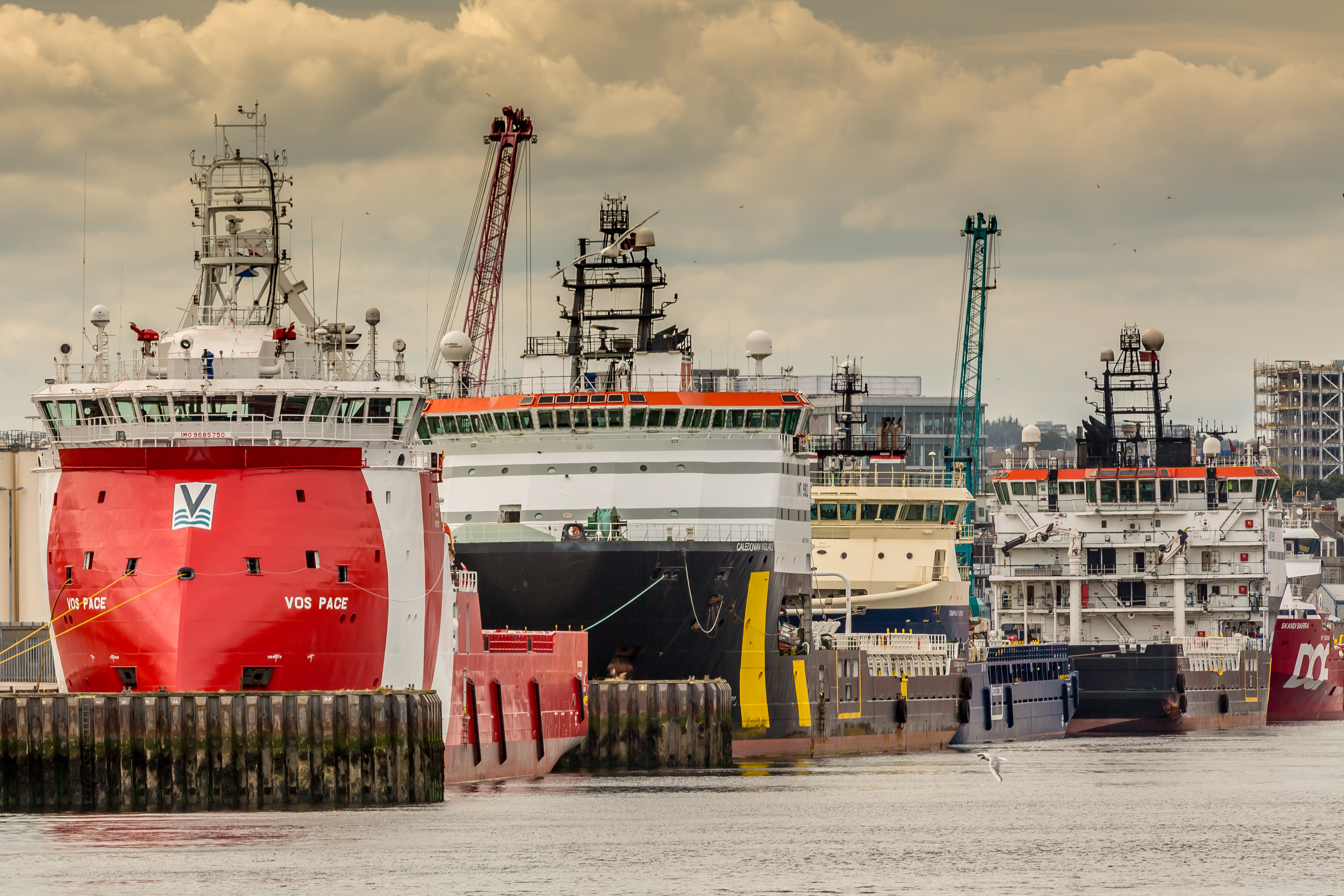
- Offshore supply vessels docked at Aberdeen during 2015. In red in front the VOS Pace
- Interactive map of Port of Aberdeen
- Location within the United Kingdom

Location
- Country: Scotland
- Location: Aberdeen
- Coordinates: 57°08′36″N 2°05′03″W
- UN/LOCODE: GB ABD

Details
- Opened: 1136; 890 years ago
- Operated by: Aberdeen Harbour Board
- Owned by: Aberdeen Harbour Board
- Type of Harbor: Trust Port
- Size of harbour: 38.8 km^{2}
- Land area: 170 hectares (420 acres)
- Draft depth: 10.5 metres (34 ft) (maximum draft)
- Employees: 120
- Chief Executive: Bob Sanguinetti
- Chairman: Roy Buchan

Statistics
- Vessel arrivals: 6,969 (2023)
- Annual cargo tonnage: 3,212,978 (2020)
- Passenger traffic: 175,000 (2023)
- Annual revenue: £48 million
- Net income: £25m (after tax)
- Quay length: 7600m
- Website www.portofaberdeen.co.uk

Aberdeen Harbour, rebranded as the Port of Aberdeen in 2022, is a sea port located in the city of Aberdeen on the east coast of Scotland. The port was first established in 1136 and has been continually redeveloped over the centuries to provide a base for significant fishing and ship building industries. Since the 1970s it has provided support to the offshore oil and gas industry operating in the North Sea and it is the main commercial port in the north east of Scotland.

The Port of Aberdeen is the largest port in Scotland (by berthage and area) and the busiest port via vessel visits in Scotland also.

In 2023, the Port of Aberdeen opened South Harbour. This £420 million extension added 1.5km of deep water berthage to support cruise ships, cargo vessels and the Offshore wind sector.

Port of Aberdeen is the UK's oldest business, since 1136.

== History ==
=== 12th to 16th century ===
A port has existed at Aberdeen since at least the 12th century, with the first recorded reference being from 1136, when King David I of Scotland permitted the Bishops of Aberdeen the right to charge a tithe on all vessels visiting the port. Located on the estuary of the River Dee, the area initially comprised sandbanks and waterlogged marshes. At that time the river entered the area from the south west on a northerly course before turning eastwards towards the sea, featuring a series of channels and islets (known locally as 'inches'). The channels were also fed by the Den Burn, a tributary of the Dee, which flowed from the north east. The port was located on the northern most channel, immediately to the south of the town. It is thought that these channels, sandbanks and islets changed position over time, as maps dating from 1661 and 1773 show noticeably different arrangements.

The area experienced a number of issues which could make navigation into the port difficult. Coastal currents and northerly winds would often allow a sandbank to form at the mouth of the river, leaving a water depth of only a few feet. The tidal area did not have any protection from easterly storms, and the channel leading to the town was shallow and obstructed. The first known improvements to address these issues are recorded in a charter dating from 1281, which indicates that a bulwark ran southwards from the bottom of Shiprow. It is thought that this may be the 'Old Pier' which appears on a 1773 plan of Aberdeen. Later in 1339, records mention the 'quay of Aberdeen', which was repaired in 1453 and either repaired or rebuilt during 1484.

The Shore Porters Society, one of the UK's oldest companies, was created to service the harbour in 1498. It was established as a co-operative to provide transportation of goods to the centre of Aberdeen for a fixed rate.

The establishment of trade links with ports in Scandinavia and the Baltic states resulted in improvements being made at the port during the Tudor period. This included the installation of beacons at the entrance to the harbour, the clearance of obstructions from the channel and more repairs to the quayside in 1512 and 1526. The work of 1526 specified cut stone, suggesting that the earlier quay may have been constructed from rough drystone masonry and timber. The port's first cargo-handling crane was erected in 1582. During 1595 King James VI issued a charter to raise funding for improvements, with considerable work thereafter being undertaken, including repair of the bulwark, pier, shore and harbour.

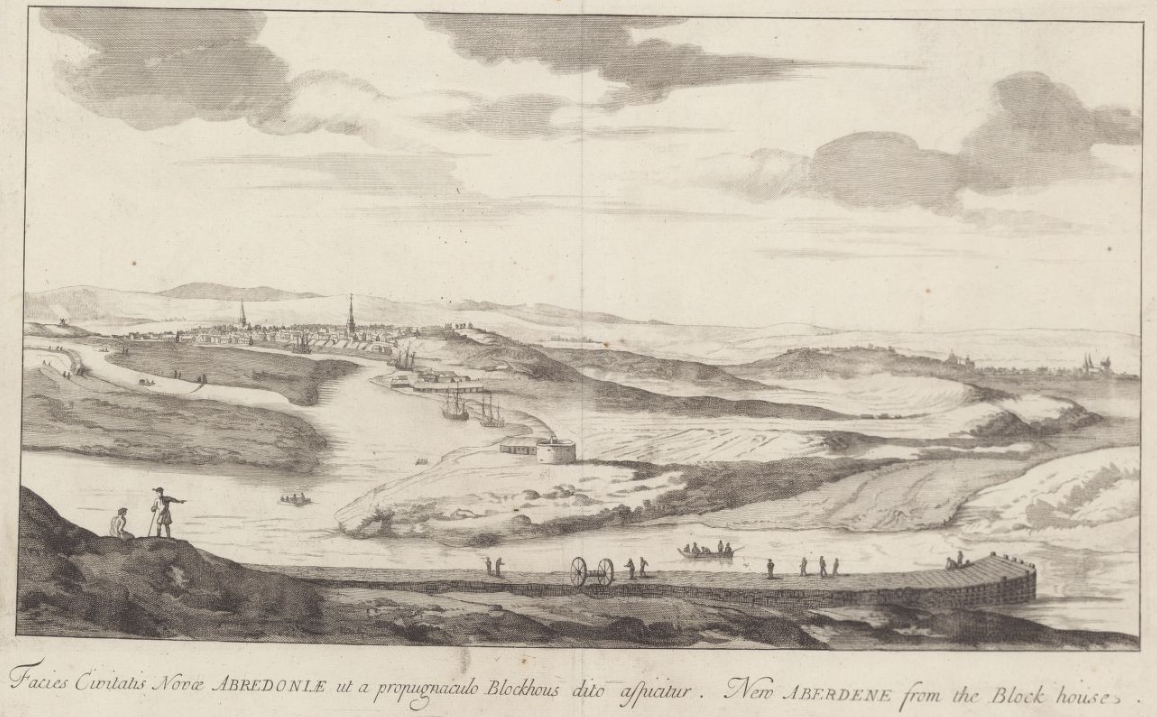
An engraving by John Slezer published in 1693 showing the 1609 bulwark in the foreground and harbour quayside & town in the background

In an attempt to address the problem of the sandbank, a bulwark known as the 'South Pier' was constructed in 1609 on the south side of the harbour entrance. It was formed from a drystone construction with timber stakes and positioned so that it would deflect the current of the river northwards, washing away the sandbank. However, the bank continued to cause problems, with water backing up and flowing over the quayside during floods.

=== 17th and 18th century ===
Aberdeen Harbour Act 1772
- Act of Parliament
- Parliament of Great Britain
- Long title: An Act for deepening, cleansing, and making more commodious the Harbour of Aberdeen; for erecting new Piers and Quays therein; and for regulating Ships and Vessels trading into and going out of the said Harbour.
- Citation: 13 Geo. 3. c. 29
- Territorial extent: Great Britain

Dates
- Royal assent: 1 April 1773
- Commencement: 26 November 1772 (Note: Start of session.)
- Repealed: 12 July 1829
Other legislation
Amended by	Aberdeen Harbour Act 1795
Repealed by	Aberdeen Harbour Act 1829

Status: Repealed

Text of statute as originally enacted

Aberdeen Harbour Act 1795
- Act of Parliament
- Parliament of Great Britain
- Long title: An Act to continue the Term, and alter and enlarge the Powers of an Act made in the thirteenth Year of the Reign of His present Majesty, intituled, "An Act for deepening, cleansing and making more commodious the Harbour of Aberdeen; for erecting New Piers and Quays therein; and for regulating Ships and Vessels trading into, and going out of the said Harbour."
- Citation: 35 Geo. 3. c. 41
- Territorial extent: Great Britain

Dates
- Royal assent: 28 April 1795
- Commencement: 28 April 1795 (Note: The Acts of Parliament (Commencement) Act 1793.)
- Repealed: 12 July 1829
Other legislation
Amends	Aberdeen Harbour Act 1772
Repealed by	Aberdeen Harbour Act 1829

Status: Repealed

Text of statute as originally enacted

Aberdeen Harbour Act 1797
- Act of Parliament
- Parliament of Great Britain
- Long title: An Act for enlarging and improving the Harbour of Aberdeen, for building new Quays, Wharfs and Docks and for making new Roads and Passages, and widening others leading to and from the said Harbour.
- Citation: 37 Geo. 3. c. 101
- Territorial extent: Great Britain

Dates
- Royal assent: 4 July 1797
- Commencement: 4 July 1797
- Repealed: 12 July 1829
Other legislation
Repealed by	Aberdeen Harbour Act 1829

Status: Repealed

Text of statute as originally enacted

A project to extend the quay downstream commenced in 1623, finally being completed in 1659, after being delayed by the Wars of the Three Kingdoms. The extension of the quay allowed former tidal ground to the north to be reclaimed from the sea and put to agricultural use.

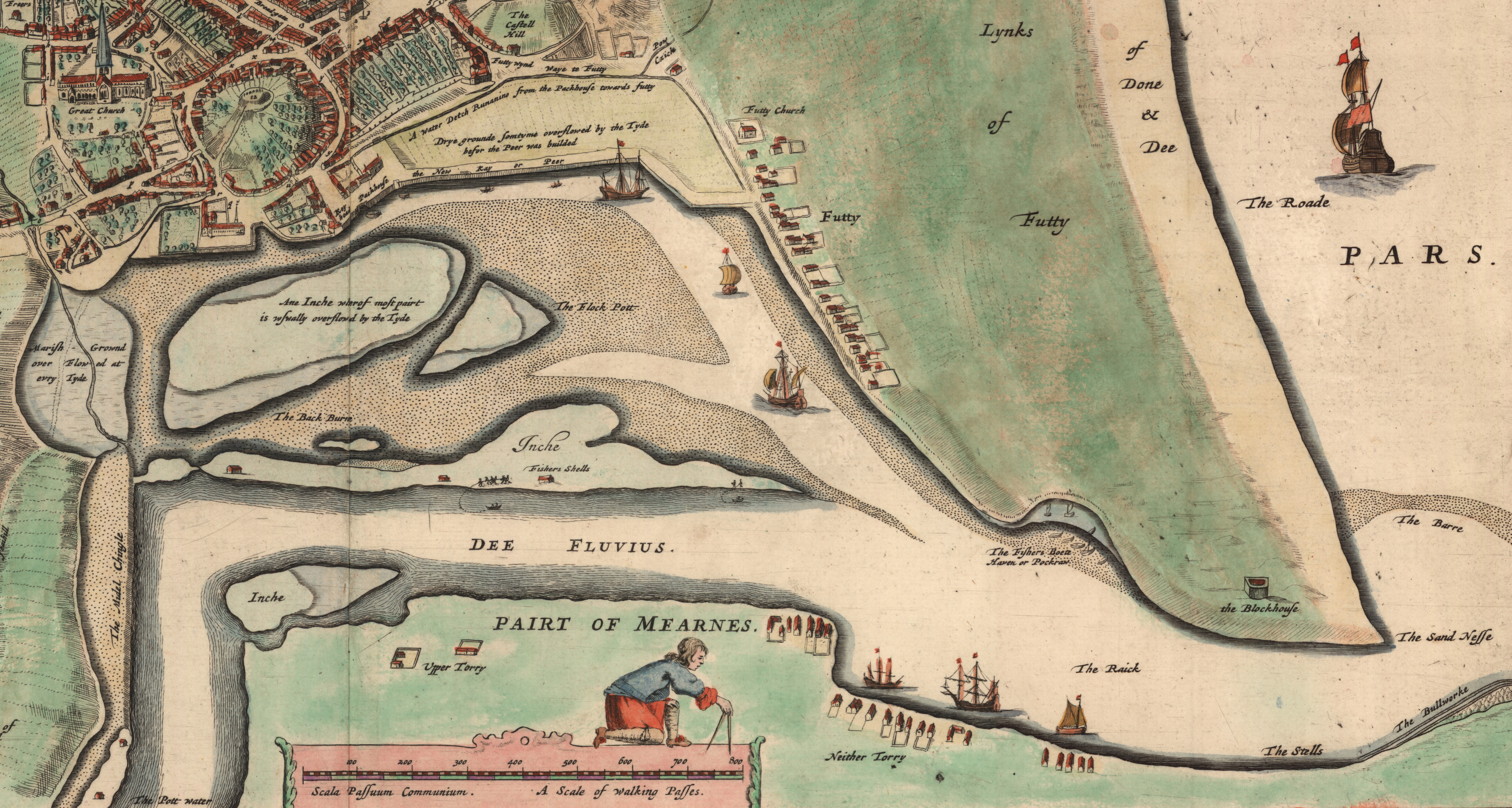
An extract from James Gordon's 1661 plan of Aberdeen showing the harbour area

A 1661 account and plan of Aberdeen by James Gordon, indicates that the quayside extended from Shiprow within the town, eastwards towards what was known as Futty, now the Queen's Links area between Waterloo Quay and Aberdeen Beach. Near the mouth of the Dee, was Pockraw, a small fishing harbour, separate from the main port. Gordon also recorded a weigh-house located near Shiprow, which had been built in the early 1630s. Meanwhile, a fishing pier was constructed between 1611 and 1612 at Torry, Aberdeen's southern neighbour across the River Dee.

The layout of the modern harbour, as it largely remains today, can be traced back to around 1770, when planning for extensive development begun. Civil engineer John Smeaton oversaw the construction of a breakwater (which became known as the North Pier) between 1775 and 1781 at Sandness (now known as Footdee or locally as Fittie). The purpose of the breakwater was to prevent sand creating a bar at the harbour entrance and to direct the flow of deposits from the River Dee into the tidal current and away from the harbour. The pier was constructed from rubble masonry with ashlar facing block and was 457 metres (500 yd; 1,499 ft) long, 9.1 metres (10.0 yd; 30 ft) wide and 4.6 metres (5.0 yd; 15 ft) high above the high-water level. The works were overseen by the harbour's engineer John Gwyn and cost £16,000. In 1789, it was found necessary to narrow the navigation-channel to limit waves generated by the presence of the new north pier, with it being considered that the pier had been sited too far to the north. The Abercrombie Jetty (also known as the 'Catch Pier') was therefore constructed.

=== 19th century ===
Aberdeen Harbour Act 1810
- Act of Parliament
- Parliament of the United Kingdom
- Long title: An Act to amend several Acts of the Thirteenth, Thirty fifth and Thirty seventh Years of His present Majesty, for deepening and making more commodious the Harbour of Aberdeen.
- Citation: 50 Geo. 3. c. lxx
- Territorial extent: United Kingdom

Dates
- Royal assent: 18 May 1810
- Commencement: 18 May 1810
- Repealed: 12 July 1829
Other legislation
Repealed by	Aberdeen Harbour Act 1829

Status: Repealed

Aberdeen Harbour Act 1813
- Act of Parliament
- Parliament of the United Kingdom
- Long title: An Act for further improving the Harbour of Aberdeen.
- Citation: 53 Geo. 3. c. clvii
- Territorial extent: United Kingdom

Dates
- Royal assent: 22 June 1813
- Commencement: 22 June 1813
- Repealed: 12 July 1829
Other legislation
Repealed by	Aberdeen Harbour Act 1829

Status: Repealed

Text of statute as originally enacted

Aberdeen Harbour Act 1829
- Act of Parliament
- Parliament of the United Kingdom
- Long title: An Act for the Improvement of the Harbour of Aberdeen.
- Citation: 10 Geo. 4. c. xxxiv
- Territorial extent: United Kingdom

Dates
- Royal assent: 14 May 1829
- Commencement: 12 July 1829
Other legislation
Repeals/revokes	Aberdeen Harbour Act 1792; Aberdeen Harbour Act 1795; Aberdeen Harbour Act 1797; Aberdeen Harbour Act 1810; Aberdeen Harbour Act 1813
Repealed by	Aberdeen Harbour Act 1843

Status: Repealed

Text of statute as originally enacted

Aberdeen Harbour Act 1843
- Act of Parliament
- Parliament of the United Kingdom
- Long title: An Act for improving and maintaining the Harbour of Aberdeen.
- Citation: 6 & 7 Vict. c. lxxii
- Territorial extent: United Kingdom

Dates
- Royal assent: 12 July 1843
Other legislation
Repealed by	Aberdeen Harbour Act 1868

Status: Repealed

Text of statute as originally enacted

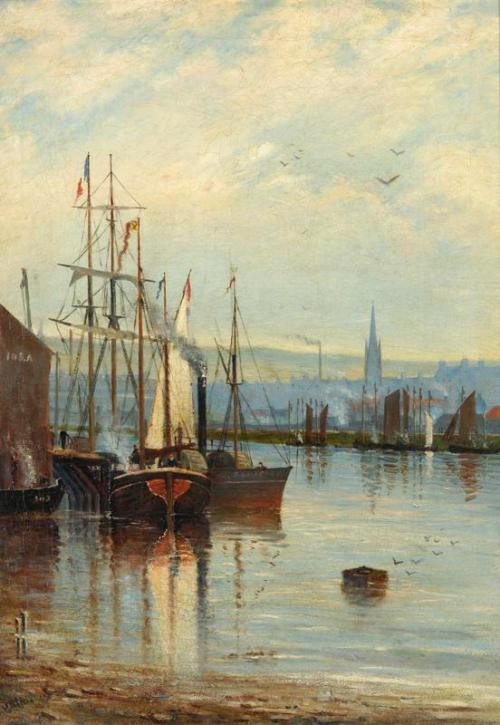
View of Aberdeen Harbour by William Duthie

Civil engineer Thomas Telford recommended several improvements to the harbour in 1802. This included work to extend the North Pier to 610 metres (670 yd; 2,000 ft) to a point which terminated amongst rocks which had resulted in at least five shipwrecks. Work to the pier was completed in 1816 at a cost of £16,000. Improvements also involved the construction of a wet dock and spillway, and the diversion of the River Dee, all overseen by resident harbour engineer John Gibb. With the exception of the wet dock (of which only the quay-walls had been constructed), all these works were recorded as being complete by 1829. During the early 19th century, other major projects included the construction of wharfs along the length of Waterloo and Regent Quays and the creation of what at the time was called the South Breakwater, but now known as the Inner or Old South Breakwater. It extended 243.8 metres (266.6 yd; 800 ft) from the south shore of the mouth of the River Dee and was completed between 1812 and 1815.

With the exception of dredging, few improvements were undertaken between 1816 and 1829. More extensive works were undertaken between 1840 and 1846, under the direction of resident engineer James Abernethy. This included widening and deepening of the harbour, the dredging of sand-banks at the harbour entrance and removal of part of Abercromby's Jetty. During this period 303 metres (994 ft; 331 yd) of new quayside was constructed. At this point in time navigation into the harbour was difficult, particularly for long steamships, as it was necessary to make a turn of almost 90 degrees between Pockra jetty and the point of the 'inch' opposite.

In 1833 Girdle Ness lighthouse was built on the headland just to the south of the harbour entrance. With the width of the entrance to the navigation channel restricted by the construction of the North Pier and South Breakwater, Abernethy considered it necessary to provide a navigational aid to assist vessels entering the harbour. As a solution, a pair of leading lights were constructed in Torry on the south shore of the River Dee. They were completed in 1842 and took the form of two cast iron tapering, octagonal-plan towers around 12 metres (39 ft). Prior to the 19th century, Aberdeen's fishing industry was relatively small compared to other settlements in the north east of Scotland (such as Peterhead) and had focused largely on river and salmon fishing. The traditional fishing fleets of Torry and Footdee also used line-fishing to catch white fish in the North Sea. In 1835, a herring fishing station was set up at the harbour, with Aberdeen's herring fleet bringing significant prosperity to the city. More efficient methods of fishing were introduced, with nets rather than lines being used to take advantage of herring shoals. A railway line to Aberdeen was opened in 1850, which allowed overnight fish trains to operate from the city to Billingsgate Fish Market in London.

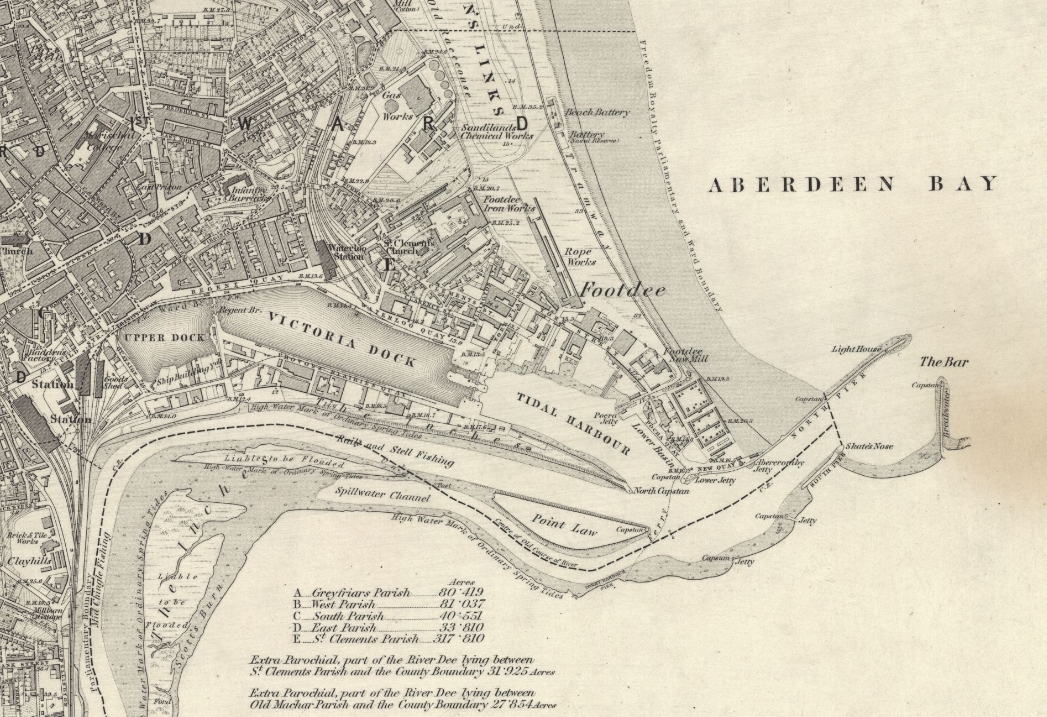
An Ordnance Survey plan published in 1869 showing the Victoria and Upper Docks, with the Albert Basin yet to be constructed

One of the most important changes during the harbour's history took place between 1843 and 1848, when the docks onto which the town's quaysides fronted were finally enclosed to create the Victoria Dock, a wet-dock of 13.8 hectares (34 acres). Replacing Wellington Quay and Lime Quay, the scheme was based on Telford's original proposals and were developed by James Abernethy with help from engineers James Walker and Alexander Gibb. The dock was divided into two parts, separated by the Regent swinging bridge. There was a larger dock to the east and smaller dock to the west, the latter corresponding with what is now known as the Upper Dock. The Victoria Dock had a depth of 4.9 metres (16 ft) and could accommodate 300 vessels. It featured two iron entrance-lock gates, 18 metres (60 ft) and 21 metres (70 ft) wide, one for vessels and the other operating as a tide gate. The northern quayside was named Waterloo Quay and the southern named Provost Blaikies Quay. During the period, the River Dee followed a course which corresponds with the modern-day Albert Basin, which was yet to be constructed.

Plans to divert the River Dee to its current route were agreed in 1868, allowing for the creation of the Albert Basin between 1869 and 1872, with Commercial Road to the formed to the north and Albert Quay to the south. The work resulted in the demolition of much of Old Torry on the south side of the river, the separate burgh being incorporated into the City of Aberdeen during 1891.

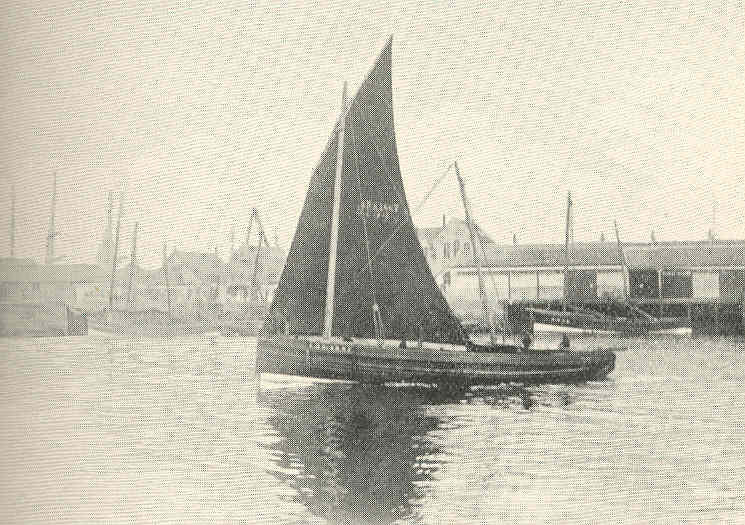
A fishing boat in Aberdeen Harbour during 1898

The Albert Basin became the centre of the port's fishing industry, being home from 1889 to a covered fish market located at Commercial Quay which could accommodate several hundred vessels. Steam trawlers were introduced to the Aberdeen fishing fleet in 1882, the first being converted Tyneside-built tugboat the Toiler. Steam powered vessels were larger and faster than sailing ships and by 1912 over 230 steam trawlers were based in Aberdeen. Due to the higher cost of steam trawlers, fishing became increasingly more commercialised, with boats being operated by companies who paid their crews a wage, rather than family businesses who would share the value of the catch with their crew. To support the fishing industry several related industries prospered in the city, including the fish market, fish processing and ship building. The fish processing industry was dominated by women who cured, gutted and packed fish, typically in teams of three, with one team for each boat. A dry dock for the repair and maintenance of steamships was opened in January 1885 at the east end of the Albert Basin. Known as Pacific Wharf, the dry dock operated until 1915. It was demolished between 1924 and 1927 to allow for an extension to the fish market.

Aberdeen Harbour Act 1868
- Act of Parliament
- Parliament of the United Kingdom
- Long title: An Act for improving and maintaining the Harbour of Aberdeen.
- Citation: 31 & 32 Vict. c. cxxxviii
- Territorial extent: United Kingdom

Dates
- Royal assent: 13 July 1868

Aberdeen Harbour Act 1871
- Act of Parliament
- Parliament of the United Kingdom
- Long title: An Act to confer further powers on the Aberdeen Harbour Commissioners.
- Citation: 34 & 35 Vict. c. xcviii
- Territorial extent: United Kingdom

Dates
- Royal assent: 13 July 1871

Text of statute as originally enacted

Aberdeen Harbour Act 1879
- Act of Parliament
- Parliament of the United Kingdom
- Long title: An Act to confer further powers on the Aberdeen Harbour Commissioners.
- Citation: 42 & 43 Vict. c. lxxxviii
- Territorial extent: United Kingdom

Dates
- Royal assent: 3 July 1879

Text of statute as originally enacted

Aberdeen Harbour Act 1895
- Act of Parliament
- Parliament of the United Kingdom
- Long title: An Act to amend and consolidate the Acts relating to the Harbour of Aberdeen and for other purposes.
- Citation: 58 & 59 Vict. c. cxxxvi
- Territorial extent: United Kingdom

Dates
- Royal assent: 6 July 1895
Other legislation
Repealed by	Aberdeen Harbour Order Confirmation Act 1960

Status: Repealed

Text of statute as originally enacted

Aberdeen Harbour Act 1899
- Act of Parliament
- Parliament of the United Kingdom
- Long title: An Act to confer further powers upon the Aberdeen Harbour Commissioners.
- Citation: 62 & 63 Vict. c. iii
- Territorial extent: United Kingdom

Dates
- Royal assent: 6 June 1899
Other legislation
Repealed by	Aberdeen Harbour Order Confirmation Act 1960

Status: Repealed

Text of statute as originally enacted

The North Pier was extended for a third and final time between 1874 and 1877, under the Aberdeen Harbour Act 1868 (31 & 32 Vict. c. cxxxviii) which authorise wider improvement works. A further 152.3 metres (500 ft; 166.6 yd) was added using concrete, resulting in its current length of 792.7 metres (2,601 ft; 866.9 yd).

Matthews Quay was constructed in 1885 and named after Aberdeen Lord Provost James Matthews, who was also a prominent architect in the city.

=== 20th century ===
The early 20th century saw the expansion of quaysides on the southern shores of the River Dee, with River Dee Dock No.1 and Maitlands Quay being constructed to the west of Torry Harbour between 1909 and 1915. This coincided with the development of Torry which saw new streets, a school and church being built and later the Torry Marine Laboratory, shipbuilding yards and sawmills.

On 1 July 1909, crowds gathered to watch escape artist Harry Houdini perform an escape from the harbour waters whilst he was chained and handcuffed.

The Annual Reports of the Fishery Board for Scotland provide an insight into fishing in Aberdeen in the years before the First World War. For example, the report for 1902 is very enthusiastic: "The marvellous succss of the trawling industry is the principal point of interest. Everything connected with it has made substantial increase since last year. 286 additional fishermen have been employed; the vessels trawling from the port have increased from 186 to 281...". At that time, neither the trawlers nore their crews were included in the Board's statistics. This changed in 1910, resulting in the abrupt differences to be seen in the charts below. By this point in time the report states that fishing boats from Aberdeen were fishing off Shetland, Orkney North Western Grounds, St. Kilda, Flannan Islands, Barrahead, West Coast of Ireland, Iceland and Faroe and in the North Sea in latitudes 56° to 61°.

Fishery Statistics

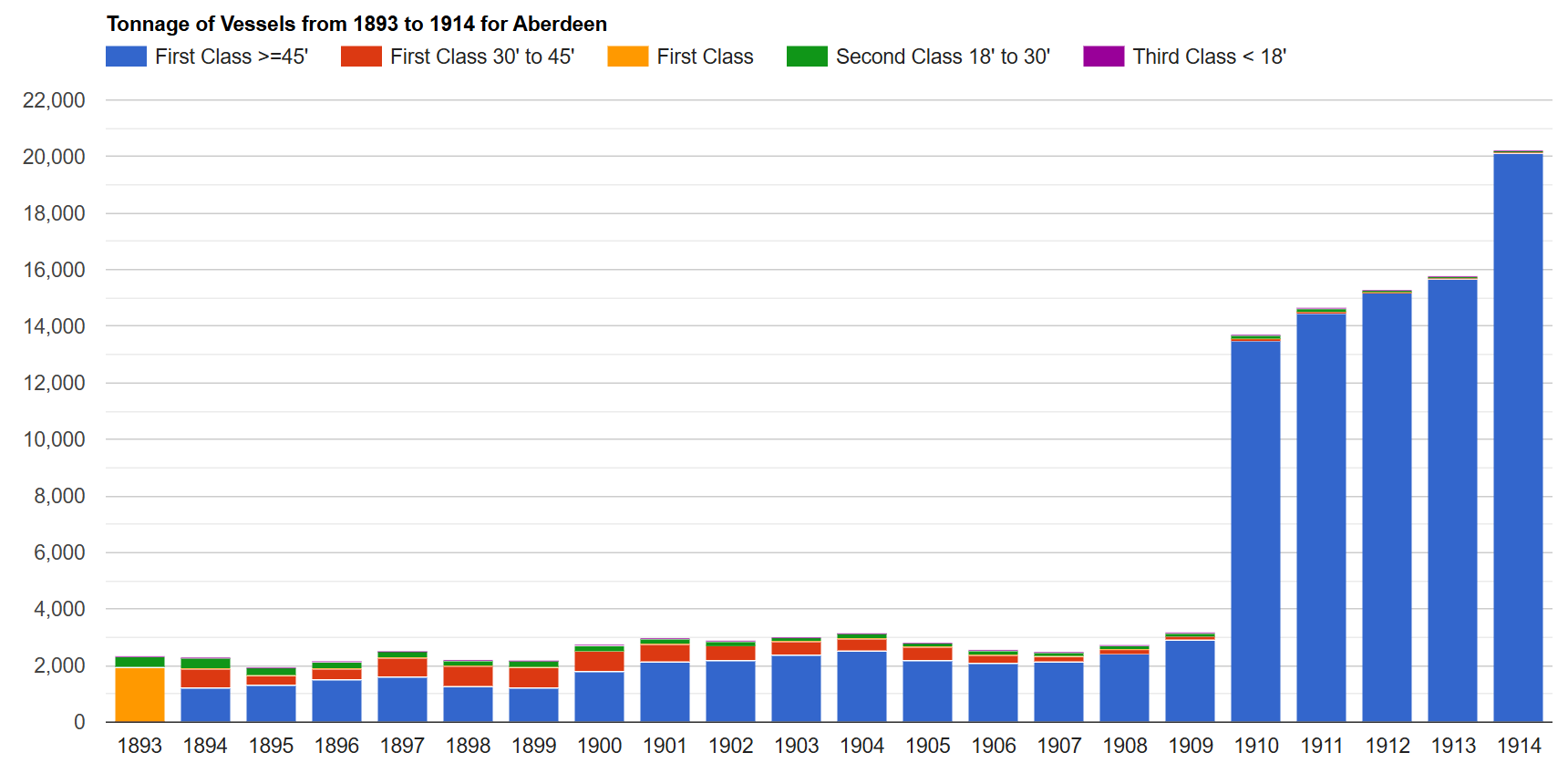
Tonnage of vessels

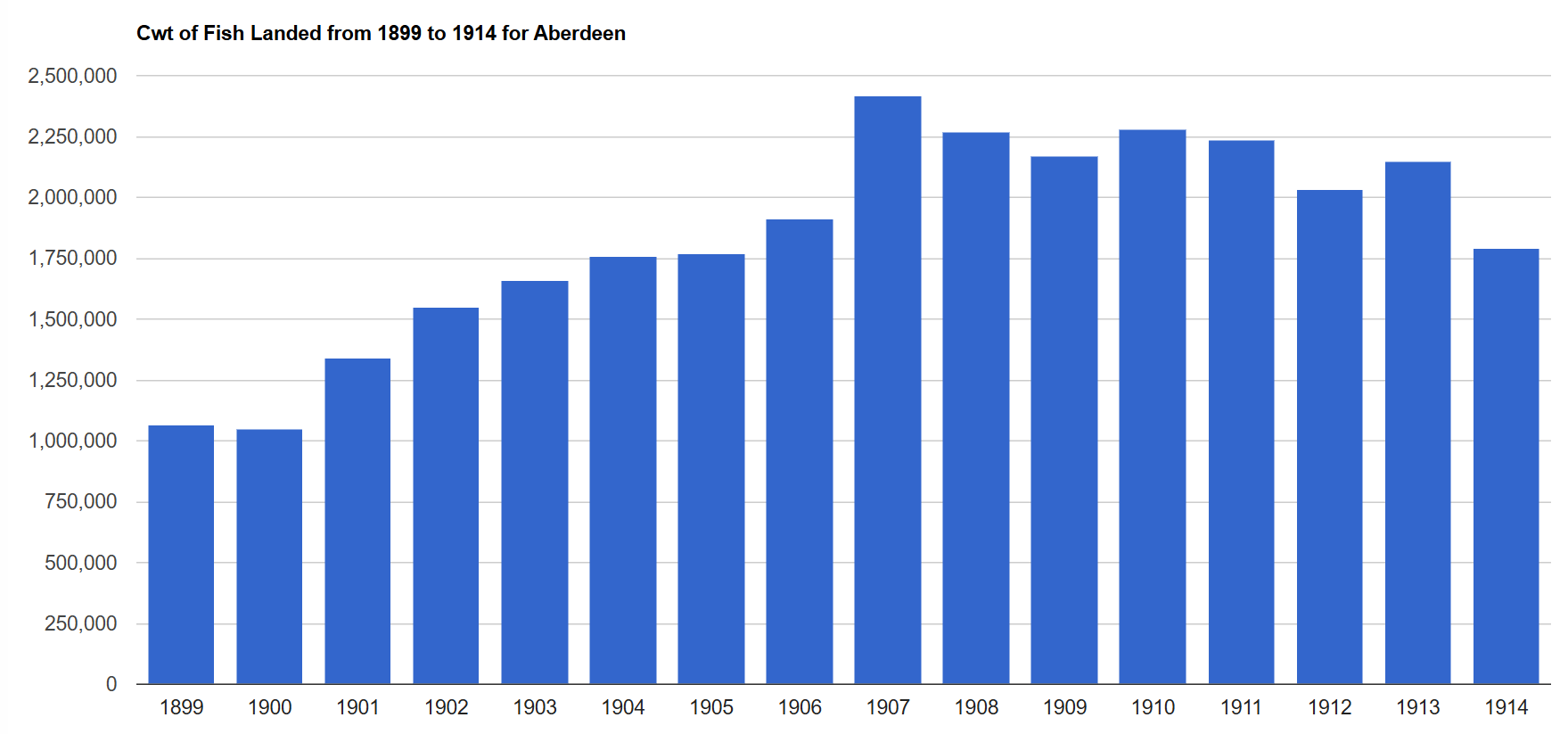
Cwt of fish landed

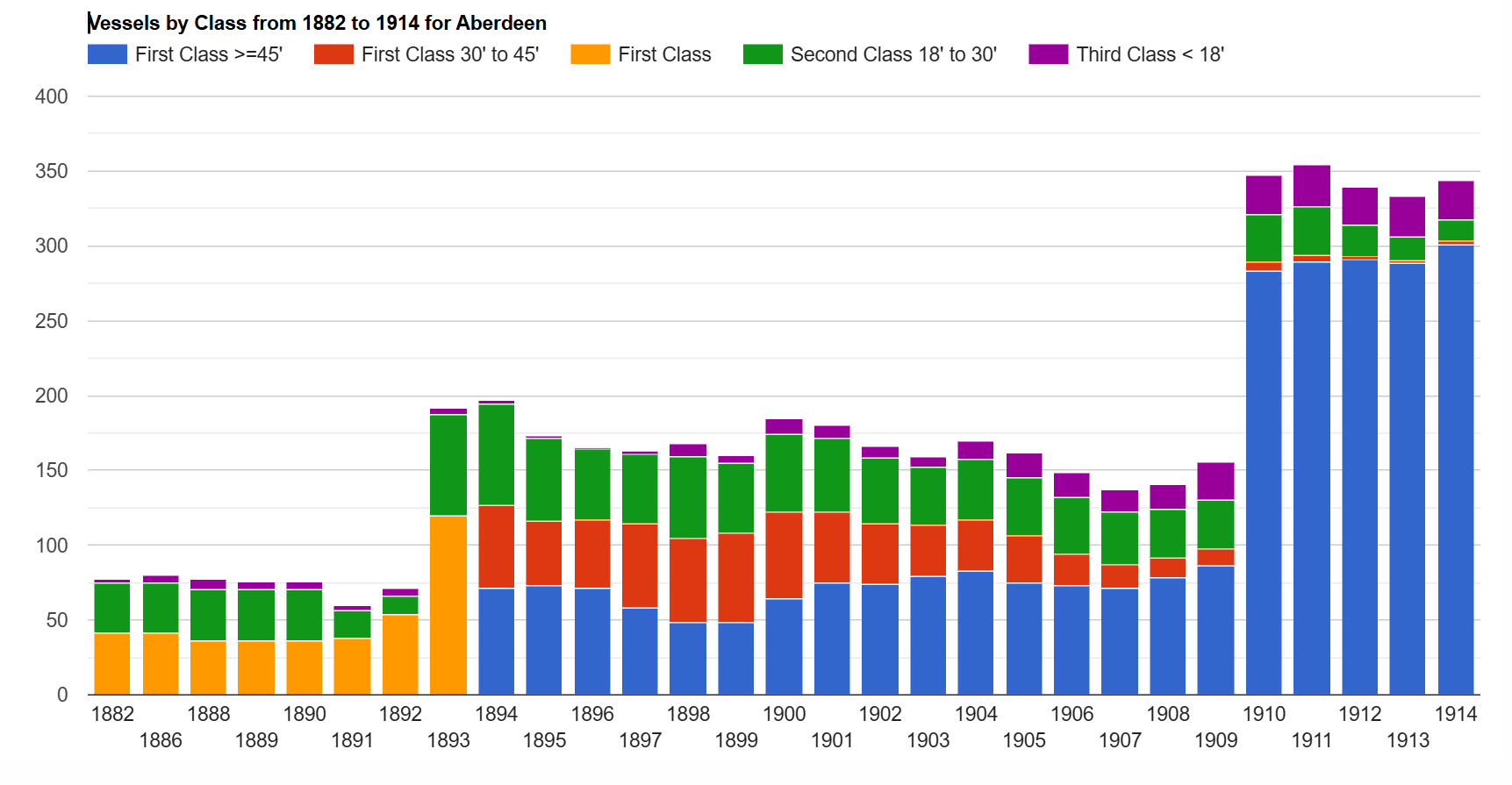
Vessels by class

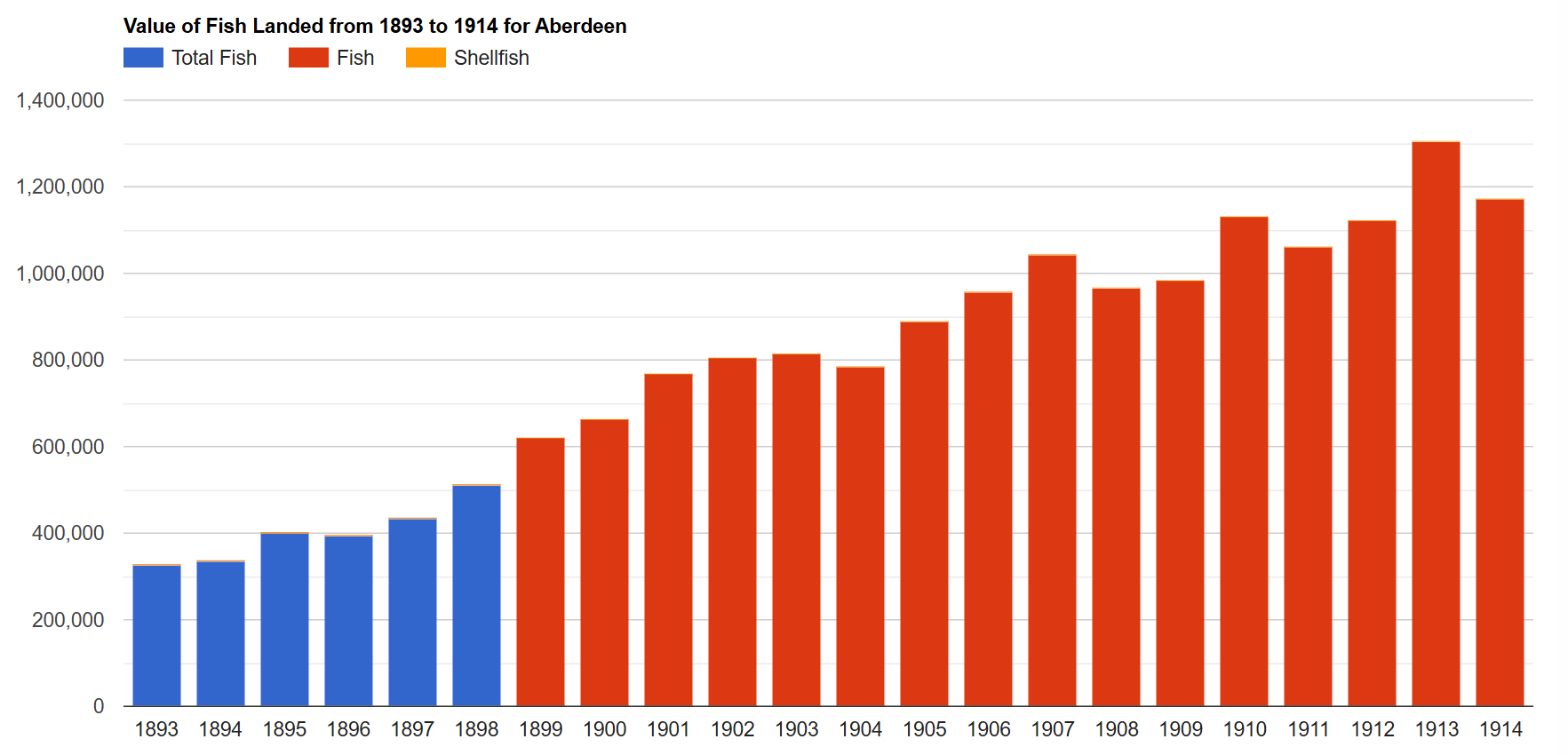
Value (£) of fish landed

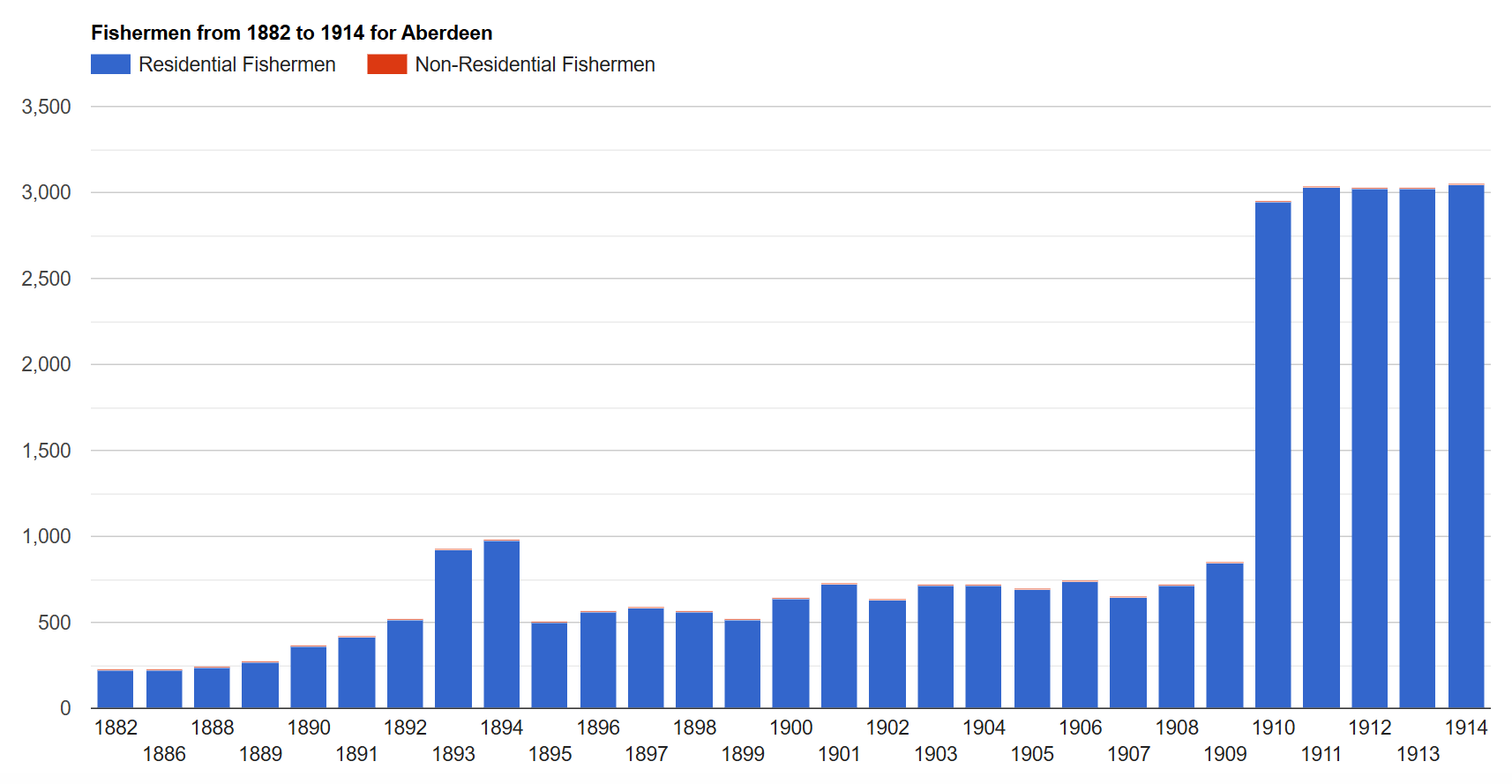
Fishermen

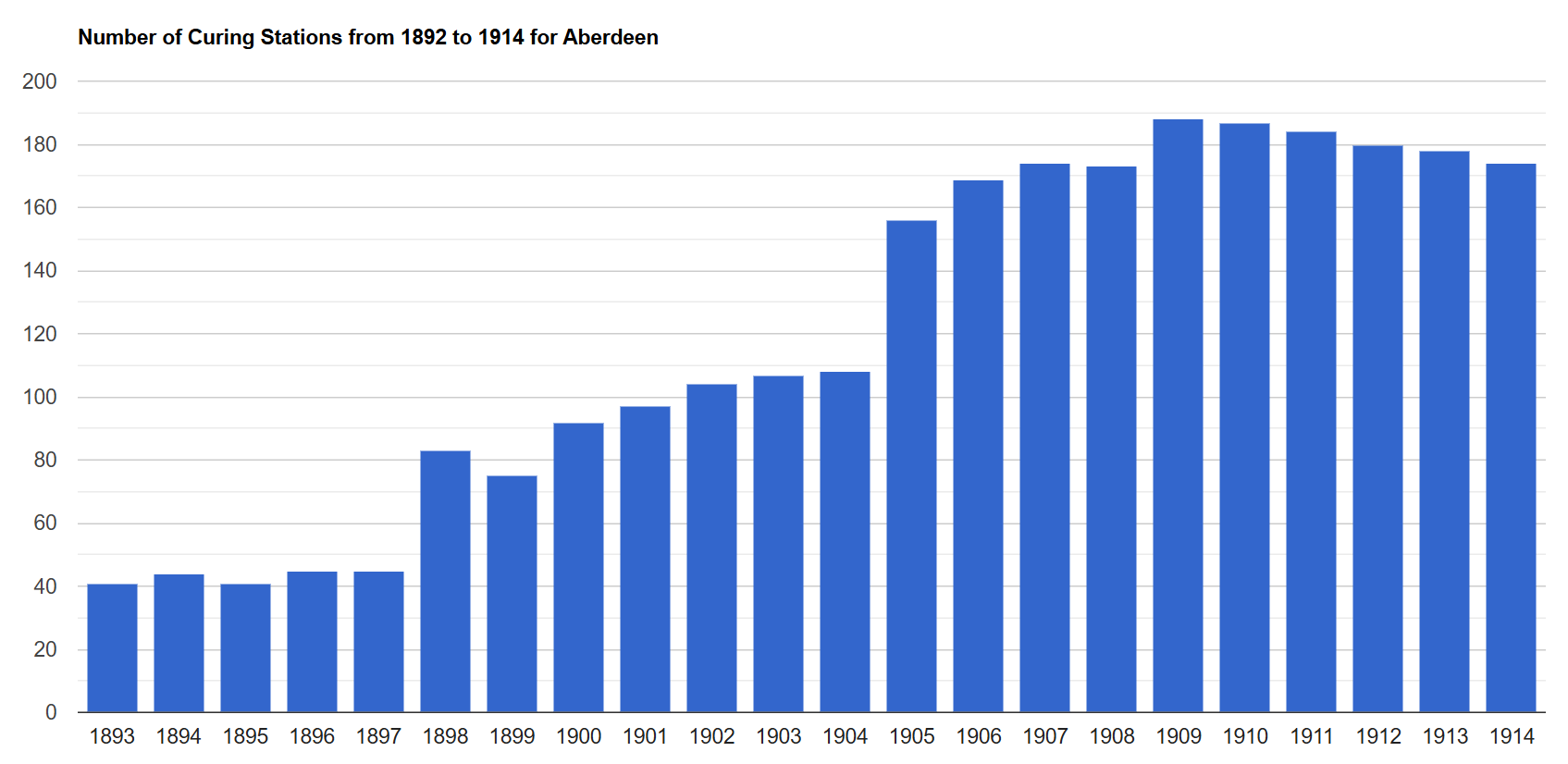
Number of curing stations

Aberdeen's last steam trawlers stopped fishing in the 1950s as they were replaced by motor powered boats which had become more affordable and efficient.

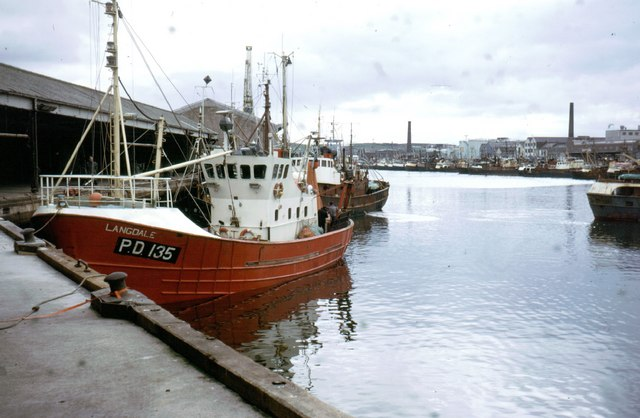
Fishing trawlers at Aberdeen Harbour during 1975

By the 1960s, Aberdeen was established as the primary whitefish port in Scotland and after Hull and Grimsby one of the main trawler ports in the UK. The Aberdeen fleet consisted of a mixture of middle-distance trawlers embarking on sixteen-day trips to the seas around the Faroe Islands and smaller vessels known as Aberdeen scratchers, which operated in the North Sea and off the west coast of Scotland. The fleet also comprised around thirty larger great-line boats, which would typically be at sea for up to 28 days and fished in deeper waters, predominately for halibut.

Although several local owners invested in new stern trawlers, by the late 1960s, Aberdeen was facing economic decline with an ageing fishing fleet rapidly reducing in size and the ship building industry also declining. In 1978 Aberdeen was still the main Scottish port for white-fish processing, with approximately 2,500 full-time employees working in the sector. However, most of the fish landed in Aberdeen was from seine net boats sailing from ports in Fife and north-east Scotland rather than the Aberdeen fleet.

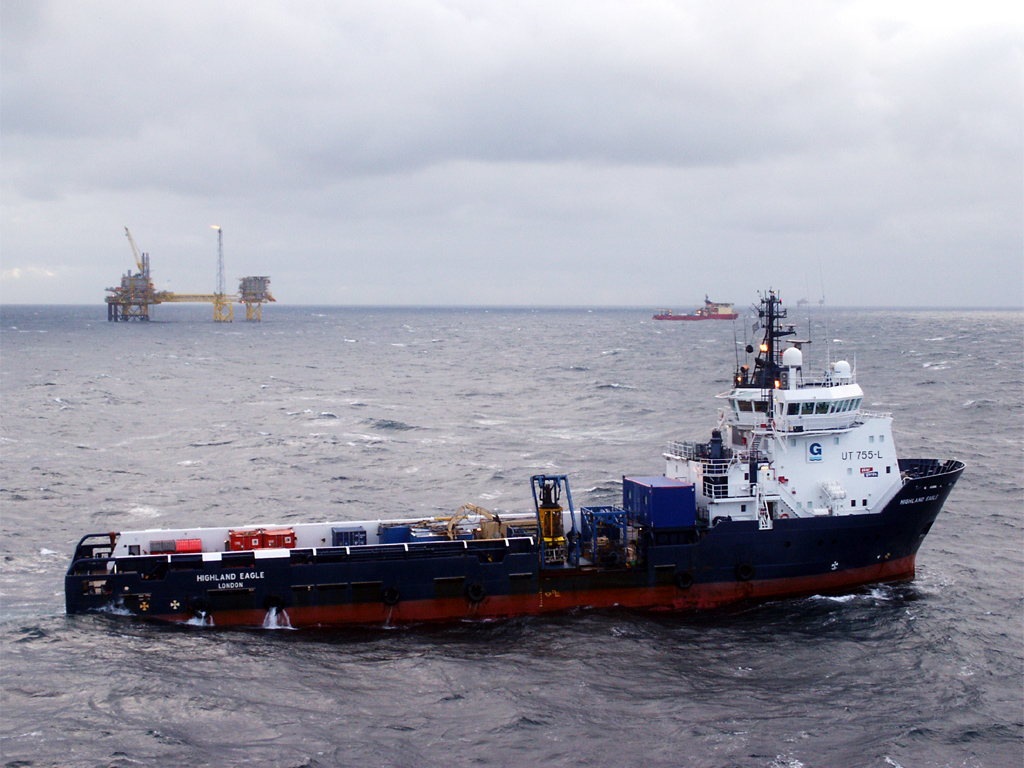
Aberdeen is used as a base for offshore supply vessels servicing oil and gas platforms in the North Sea

Aberdeen's economic prospects improved when oil and natural gas were discovered in the North Sea, however the significance of this to Aberdeen was not apparent until the discovery by BP of the Forties field in October 1970 and the East Shetland Basin discovery by Shell in July 1971.

In 1973, Shell became the first oil company to enter a partnership with the harbour to create an oil and gas supply base at Maitlands Quay on the River Dee. The redevelopment saw the remainder of Old Torry demolished, with only a few houses left and none dating from earlier than the 19th century. The late 1960s and early 1970s saw investment from central government to allow the reconstruction of Mearns Quay, 180 metres (600 ft) of Commercial Quay and part of the fish-market. The Victoria Dock was redeveloped and the tide locks at Waterloo Quay were removed in 1975, resulting in the whole harbour again becoming tidal, with dredging occurring as necessary to maintain the required depths.

Other offshore supply bases were established and the harbour went through a period of significant redevelopment to become the primary port in Europe to serve the offshore oil and gas industry.

In 1984, Mearns Quay was extended westwards into the River Dee Dock through the use of steel sheet piling.

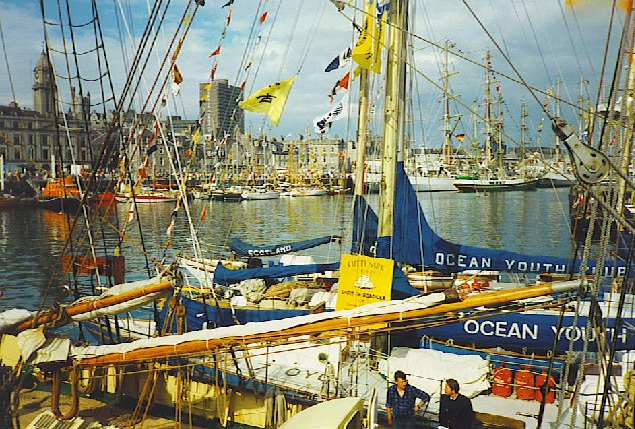
Sailing ships seen at Aberdeen Harbour during the 1991 Cutty Sark Tall Ships Race

During the 1990s, the harbour was host to the Cutty Sark Tall Ships Race on two occasions. The first visit, during 1991 saw more than 310,000 people visited the city to see the dozens of sailing ships taking part in the race. The event included a fire works display launched from the North Pier. The second visit of the race during 1997 saw attracted 558,000 visitors.

=== 21st century ===
As a result of a declining fishing industry in Aberdeen, market sales of fish ended in the mid-1990s. The fish market at Commercial Quay was demolished between 2006 and 2007, 118 years after the first covered market was established at the harbour.

By 2015, it was estimated that the harbour generated approximately £1.5 billion (gross value added) and 12,260 jobs for the Scottish economy. This included £1.4 billion (GVA) and 9,565 jobs for the Aberdeen City and Aberdeenshire economies.

A £36m project to infill the River Dee Dock and create four new berths along the River Dee was completed in 2016.

In May 2017, construction started on a new harbour at Nigg Bay to the south of the existing harbour. The £350 million project is the largest marine infrastructure project in the UK and when complete will be the largest port in terms of available berths in Scotland, capable of accommodating vessels up to 300m in length. Four new quays are under construction, the 300m-long Balmoral Quay, the 400m-long Dunnottar Quay, the 175m-long Crathes Quay and the 540m-long Castlegate Quay. The new harbour is expected to create an additional 7,000 jobs and add £1 billion annually to the economy by 2035.

In May 2022, the harbour was rebranded from Aberdeen Harbour to Port of Aberdeen. The new name encompasses both the new south harbour as well as the original harbour which since the development of the new harbour has sometimes been known as the north harbour. The rebranding was undertaken to avoid confusion between the two parts of the harbour and to reflect the commercial nature of the port.

== Ship building ==
Aberdeen had a significant shipbuilding industry for over 200 years, with over 3,000 ships being built at shipyards within the port between 1790 and 1990. There were five main shipbuilders:

=== Alexander Hall and Sons ===
Established in 1790, Alexander Hall and Sons was known for building sailing ships such as Scottish Maid and designed the 'Aberdeen' or 'clipper' bow in 1839. It also built steam ships, one of the most famous being the Jho Sho Maru which was built for the Imperial Japanese Navy in the 1860s. The yard failed to modernise and was acquired by Aberdeen-based Hall, Russell & Company in 1957.

=== Walter Hood & Co. ===
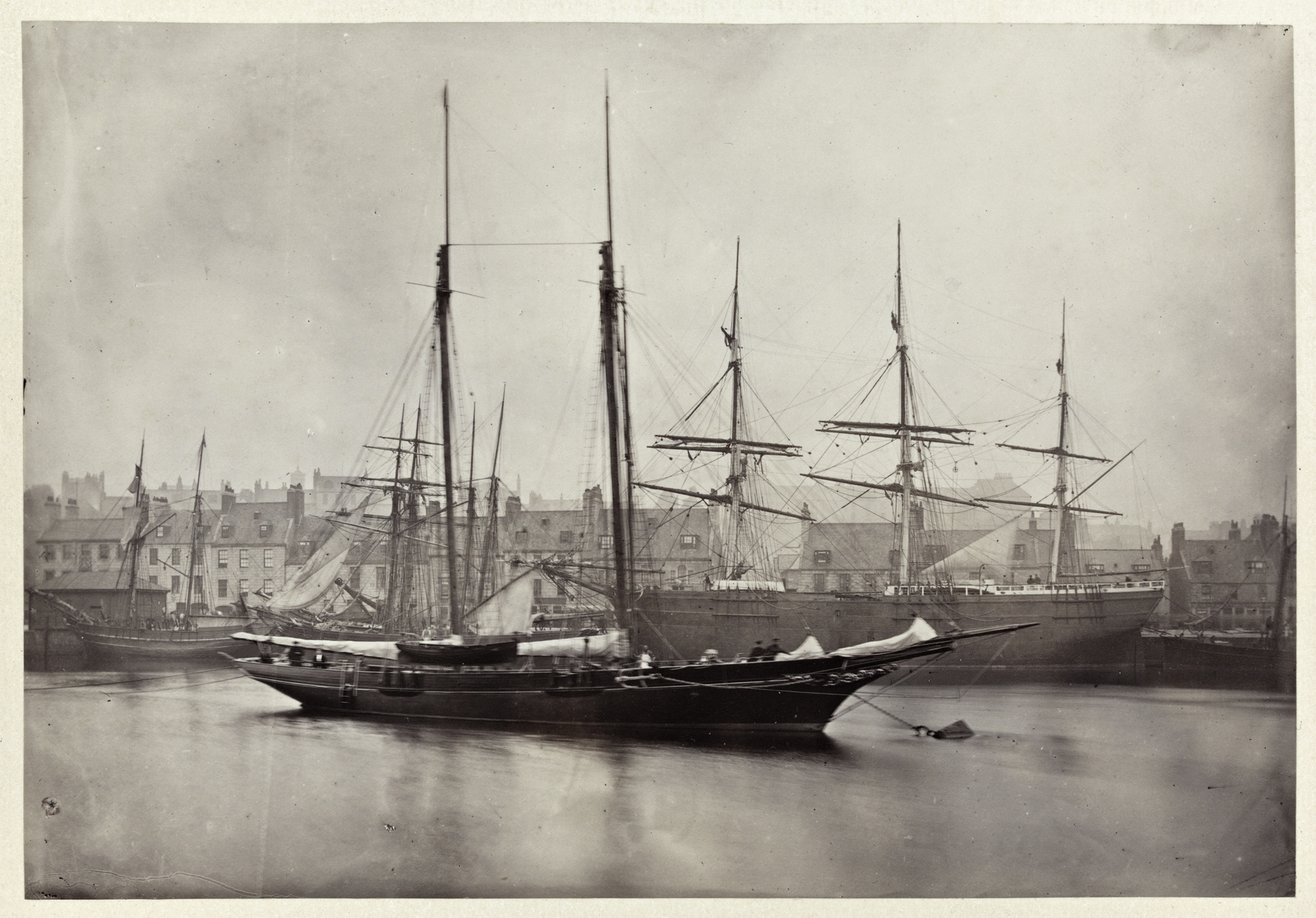
Nereid, a brig constructed in Aberdeen by Walter Hood and Co. and launched in 1860

The Walter Hood & Co. shipyard opened in 1839 and was located adjacent to Pocra jetty, east of the Hall Russell yard. It is considered to have produced some of the finest sailing ships built in Aberdeen, including the clipper Thermopylae, which was built for the Aberdeen Line and launched in 1868. The yard never manufactured engines and with propeller-driven vessels becoming increasingly popular the yard became unable to compete, leading to a merger with Alexander Hall and Sons in 1871.

=== Duthie ===
The first Duthie Shipyard was opened in 1816 by William Duthie. It mainly predominately built brigantines and schooners but also undertook repair work. In 1839 it was renamed Alexander Duthie & Co. and began building clipper bow vessels, both for local and international customers. In 1861, the yard became John Duthie, Sons & Co. and throughout the 1860s continued to produce vessels constructed from timber, despite competitors developing use of composite designs and iron. The yard's first iron vessel was launched in 1869 and by the 1880s the yard predominately built trawlers. It closed in 1907 with the premises taken over by Hall Russell.

Two other yard operated by the Duthie family existed. William Duthie Junior operated a yard from the inches opposite Footdee from 1855 to 1870. John Duthie Torry Shipbuilding Co. was located in Torry between 1904 and 1925.

=== John Lewis & Sons ===
John Lewis & Sons was established in 1907, initially producing and repairing marine engines at Maitlands Quay area in Torry. With the First World War generating demand, it built its first vessel in 1917, going on to specialise in cargo and fishing vessels. It constructed the last Aberdeen-built sailing ship, the sail-training schooner Malcolm Miller, in 1967. The yard was purchased by Wood Group in 1972 and its activities moved towards ship repair.

=== Hall, Russell & Company ===
Peacock class offshore patrol vessel HMS Starling seen berthed at the Hall, Russell & Company shipyard where it was built in the early 1980s

Hall, Russell & Company was established in 1864. It built a wide range of fishing boats, cargo steamers and trawlers. During the First World War, the yard constructed minesweeper trawlers and during the Second World War contributed to the war effort by producing Flower-class corvettes, frigates and other naval vessels. Post-war, Hall Russell constructed trawlers and cargo ships, including the freighter Thameshaven in 1971, which was Aberdeen's largest ever vessel with a deadweight of 10,500 tonnes.

In 1977, the yard was nationalised and became part of the state-owned British Shipbuilders. It built several offshore patrol vessels and torpedo recovery vessels for the British Ministry of Defence. It was privatised in 1986 and despite traditionally building fishing and cargo vessels, was classed as a naval shipbuilder. This hindered the ability to obtain contracts in the merchant vessel market, resulting in a downturn in work.

The yard was acquired by A&P Appledore in 1989 but business did not improve. The last vessel to be built at the yard and in Aberdeen was cargo-liner RMS St Helena which was completed in 1990, bring over 200 years of shipbuilding in Aberdeen to an end. The yard carried out repair work until its closure in 1992.

The site was redeveloped to create the Telford Dock, which provided five new deep-water berths, a jetty, two transit sheds and 26,000sqm of heavy-duty paved open storage. The dock's quays were each named after Aberdeen's shipbuilders, except for the Clipper Quay which relates to the bow design invented in the city.

== Port facilities ==
=== Docks and berths ===
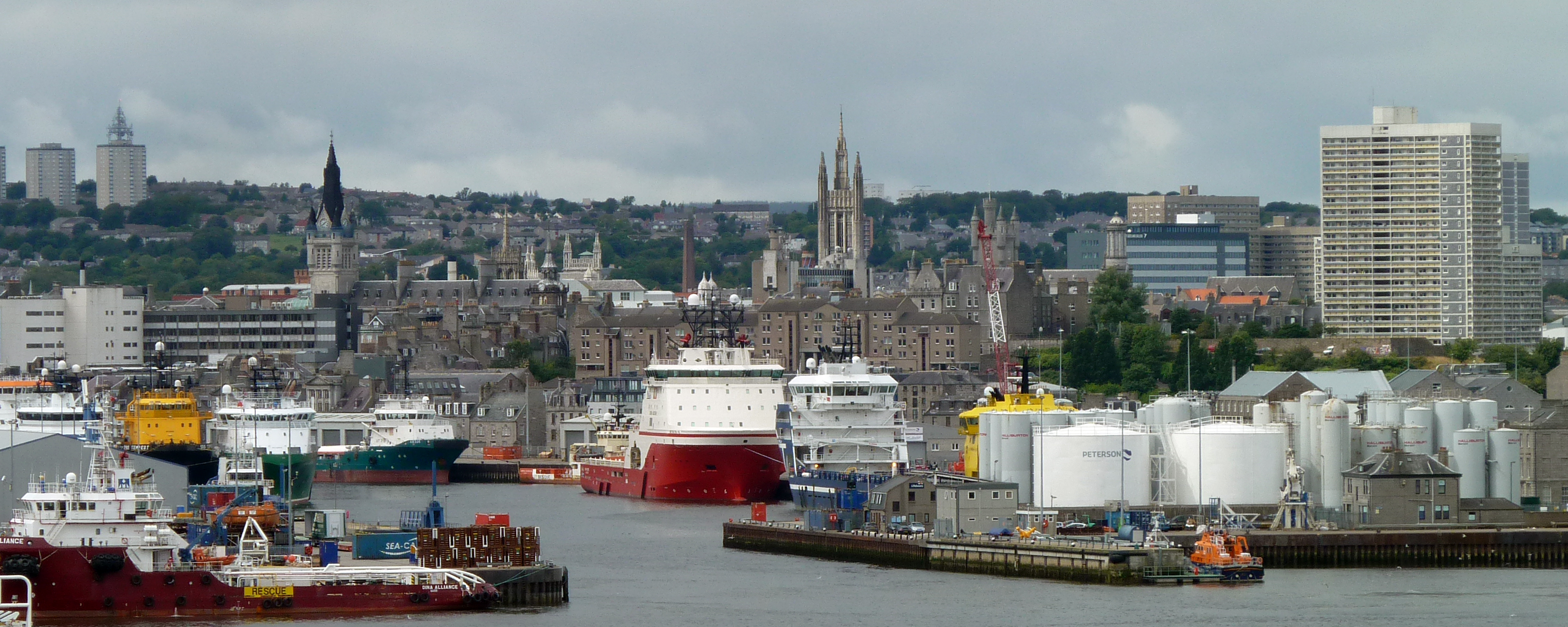
The Upper Dock & Victoria Dock (left) and Telford Dock (right) during 2014

The Port of Aberdeen has six docks, each with several quays and berths as described below.

Albert Basin

- Albert Quay
- Albert Quay Bunker Berth
- Albert Quay East
- Albert Quay West
- Atlantic Wharf
- Commercial Quay East
- Commercial Quay West
- Eurolink Ro-Ro Berth
- Pacific Wharf
- Palmerston Quay

River Dee

- Mearns Quay
- Point Law South
- Torry Quay

Telford Dock

- Clipper Quay
- Duthies Quay
- Halls Quay
- Russells Quay
- Telford Jetty

Tidal Harbour

- Dry Dock
- Matthews Quay Cross Berth
- Matthews Quay North
- Pocra Base
- Pocra Quay
- Point Law Cross Berth
- Point Law North

Upper Dock

- Jamiesons Quay
- Passenger Ro-Ro Berth
- Regent Quay East
- Regent Quay West
- Trinity Quay
- Upper Quay

Victoria Dock

- Blaikies Quay
- Waterloo Quay Cross Berth
- Waterloo Quay East
- Waterloo Quay West

=== Dry Dock ===
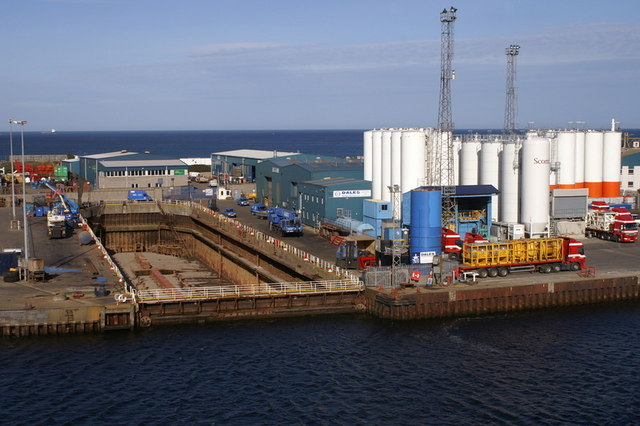
Dry dock and Pocra Quay to its right

A dry dock is located between Russells Quay and Pocra Quay. It is 112 metres (367 ft) long, 21 metres (69 ft) wide & 6.5 metres (21 ft) deep.

=== Maritime and Coastguard Agency ===
Marine House, located at Blakies Quay, is home to Aberdeen Coastguard Operations Centre (CGOC), part of Her Majesty's Coastguard and in turn the Maritime and Coastguard Agency (MCA). It is one of ten CGOC located around the United Kingdom and covers the east coast of Scotland between the inner Moray Firth to the north and outer Firth of Forth to the south. It is responsible for the mobilisation, organisation and tasking of adequate resources to respond to persons in distress in the air, at sea, in tidal waters or at risk of injury or death on the sea cliffs and shoreline within its area. HM Coastguard's Aberdeen Coastguard Rescue Team is also based at Marine House and covers a 25 miles (40 km) stretch of coastline to the north and south of Aberdeen. The MCA's Aberdeen Marine and Fishing Survey Office is also located in Marine House.

=== Lifeboat Station ===
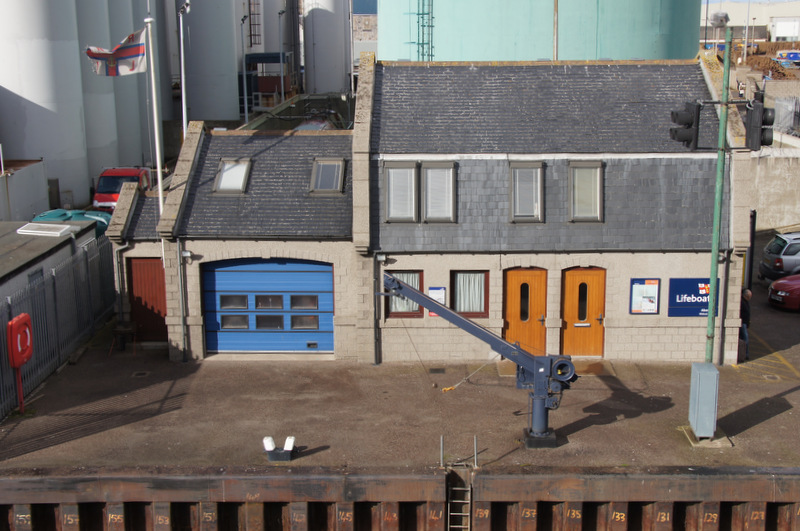
The Royal National Lifeboat Institution's Aberdeen Lifeboat Station seen in 2012

The Royal National Lifeboat Institution's (RNLI) Aberdeen Lifeboat Station is located at the entrance to the Victoria Dock. The station operates one Severn-class all-weather lifeboat (named Bon Accord) and one D-class inshore lifeboat (James Bissett Simpson). A station was first established in 1802 by the Harbour Commissioners before being transferred to the RNLI in 1925. The current lifeboat station was constructed in 1997, providing indoor space for the D-class lifeboat and improved crew facilities.

=== Marine Operations Centre ===
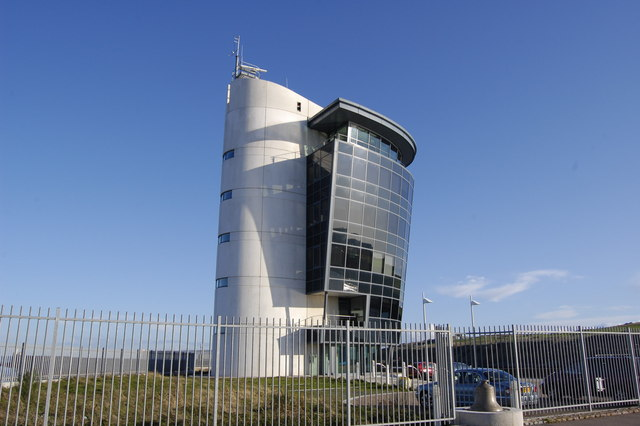
Aberdeen Harbour Marine Operations Centre which was completed in 2006

Port operations are controlled from the Marine Operations Centre located at the base of the North Pier. The building was completed in 2006 at a cost of £4.5 million. It was designed by SMC Parr Architects and is reminiscent of a traditional lighthouse, utilising precast concrete with white aggregate as well as faceted curtain wall glazing. Its prominent location at the mouth of the River Dee allows Vessel Traffic Services (VTS) staff to have an overview of the various docks and harbour entrance. The facility also features ship's bridge simulator used in training. VTS controls all shipping movements within the harbour and within a two-mile radius of the head of the North Pier.

=== Marine Training Centre ===
Oilfield services provider Petrofac operates a training centre with water access onto the River Dee. The centre operates a fleet of Fast Rescue Craft and survival craft and provides training in their operation.

=== Waterloo Multi-Modal Terminal ===
The Waterloo Mult- Modal Terminal is located immediately to the north of Waterloo Quay and provides a connection to the national rail network. The terminal is built on the site of the former Aberdeen Waterloo railway station which operated for passengers between 1856 and 1867 and freight until the 1960s when the station was demolished.

== Port operations ==
The Port of Aberdeen is the main commercial port in north east Scotland, predominately serving the offshore oil and gas industry. It also handles a variety of bulk, forest products, grains and mineral cargoes.

=== Oil and gas ===
Aberdeen is principal port servicing the UK North Sea offshore oil and gas industry. It handles a wide range of ships supporting the industry including platform supply vessels, dive support vessels, anchor handling tugs, survey vessels and emergency response vessels. By 2015, such vessels accounted for between 65% and 75% of the marine traffic at the harbour.

=== Orkney and Shetland ferries ===
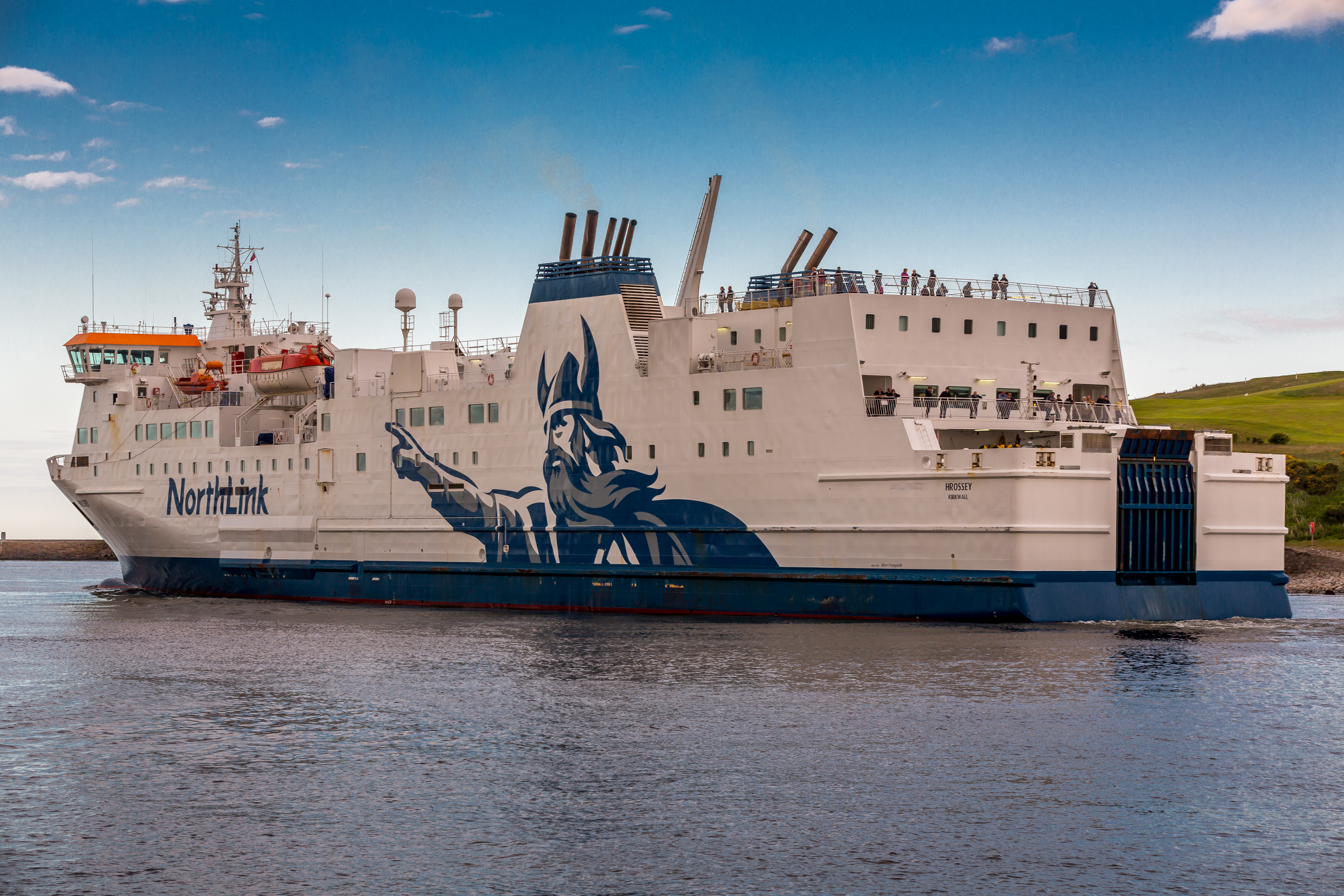
MV Hrossey setting sail from Aberdeen

Aberdeen is the mainland terminus for passenger and freight ferry routes to Orkney and Shetland. The services are run by NorthLink Ferries which operates two passenger vessels, MV Hjaltland and MV Hrossey, both of which entered service in 2002. The passenger terminal is located at Jamieson's Quay and there are nightly sailings to Shetland, with one vessel sailing from Aberdeen to Lerwick while the other ship sails in the opposite direction. One ship will sail directly whilst the other stops at Kirkwall in Orkney. NorthLink also operates two freight ferries, MV Hildasay and MV Helliar, which provide a daily service to the islands carrying a wide range of cargo including vehicles, live-stock and fish, temperature-controlled foodstuffs, shipping containers, and out-sized loads. The freight ferries berth at ro-ro ramps located at Jamiesons Quay and Matthew's Quay North.

== Governance ==
=== Harbour board ===
Aberdeen Harbour Order Confirmation Act 1960
- Act of Parliament
- Parliament of the United Kingdom
- Long title: An Act to confirm a Provisional Order under the Private Legislation Procedure (Scotland) Act 1936 relating to Aberdeen Harbour.
- Citation: 9 & 10 Eliz. 2. c. i
- Territorial extent: United Kingdom

Dates
- Royal assent: 20 December 1960
Other legislation
Relates to	Private Legislation Procedure (Scotland) Act 1936

Aberdeen Harbour Order Confirmation Act 1987
- Act of Parliament
- Parliament of the United Kingdom
- Long title: An Act to confirm a Provisional Order under the Private Legislation Procedure (Scotland) Act 1936, relating to Aberdeen Harbour.
- Citation: 1987 c. xxi
- Territorial extent: United Kingdom

Dates
- Royal assent: 16 November 1987
Other legislation
Relates to	Private Legislation Procedure (Scotland) Act 1936

Text of statute as originally enacted

The ensign of Aberdeen Harbour Board

The Port of Aberdeen is a trust port, owned and operated by Aberdeen Harbour Board. The board is an independent statutory body established by the Aberdeen Harbour Order Confirmation Act 1960 (9 & 10 Eliz. 2. c. i), and amended by the Aberdeen Harbour Order Confirmation Act 1987 (c. xxi). The board is responsible for the port's administration, maintenance and improvement. Unlike a privately owned port, there are no shareholders who require a dividend and all profits made from operations are reinvested into the port.

The board consists of twelve members. The current chief executive is Bob Sanguinetti and chairperson is Alistair Mackenzie.

Aberdeen Harbour Board replaced the Aberdeen Harbour Commission, which was formed by the Aberdeen Harbour Act 1843 (6 & 7 Vict. c. lxxii) and was revised through several acts of Parliament during the 19th and early 20th centuries.

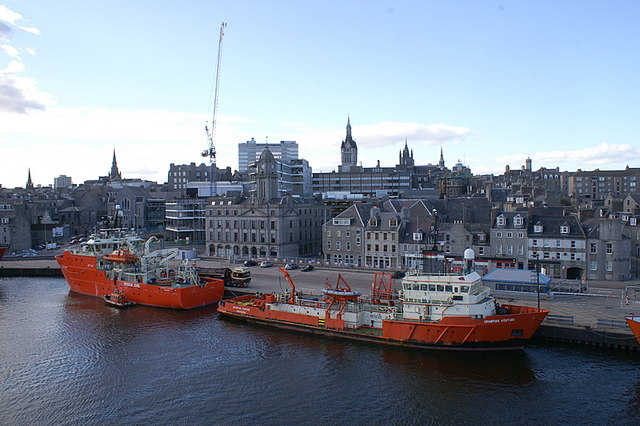
Vessels berthed at Regent Quay during 2009, the harbour board office is the quayside building featuring a clock-tower

=== Harbour board offices ===
Aberdeen Harbour Board are based in offices at 15-16 Regent Quay. The building designed by Scottish architect Alexander Marshall Mackenzie was built between 1883 and 1885. Purpose-built for the harbour board, it signified the prosperity that the harbour was experiencing at the end of the nineteenth century. It is a four-storey, eight-bay block featuring a clock tower with a domed roof. It is constructed from ashlar grey granite to the principal elevations and tower, with coursed pink granite to the rear.

== Naval associations ==
HMS Clyde was a Royal Naval Reserve training ship which was moored in the Upper Dock during the 19th century. The vessel was replaced in 1904 by a 1081-ton man o' war also named HMS Clyde (previously HMS Wild Swan). It was connected to the quayside by a floating gangway and was open to the public on Sunday mornings. She was later relocated to Albert Quay and decommissioned around 1911.

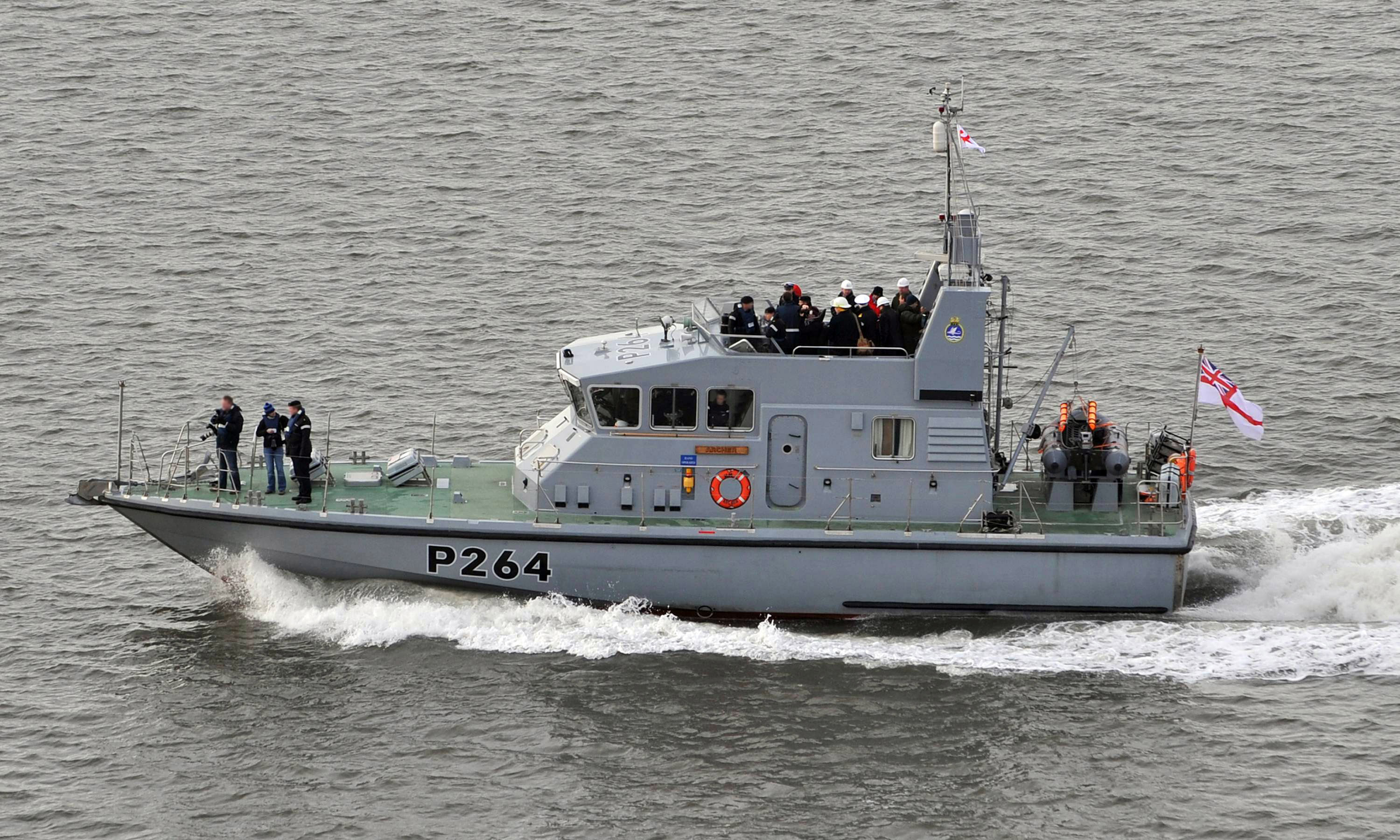
HMS Archer (P264) of the former Aberdeen University Royal Naval Unit

In 1967, Aberdeen University Royal Naval Unit (URNU) was established at the harbour. From 1991 until its relocation to Edinburgh in 2012, the unit operated HMS Archer (P264), an Archer-class patrol vessel.

HMS Diamond (D34), a Type-45 destroyer of the Royal Navy commissioned in 2011 is affiliated with Aberdeen City. The vessel has visited Aberdeen Harbour during 2011, November 2015 and August 2018. During such visits the vessel has been open to the public and her crew has taken part in community and civic events.

Naval vessels occasionally dock in Aberdeen whilst taking part in NATO's Exercise Joint Warrior which takes place in the seas around Scotland.

== Natural heritage ==
The River Dee, including the stretch within the harbour boundaries, is designated as a Special Area of Conservation under the European Union's Habitats Directive (92/43/EEC), because of its populations of freshwater pearl mussel, Atlantic salmon and otter.

The harbour and Aberdeen Bay is frequented by a variety of marine mammals, including resident populations of harbour porpoise, bottlenose dolphin, grey seal and harbour seal as well as seasonal populations of minke whale.

== Built heritage ==
=== Navigation Control Centre (Roundhouse) ===
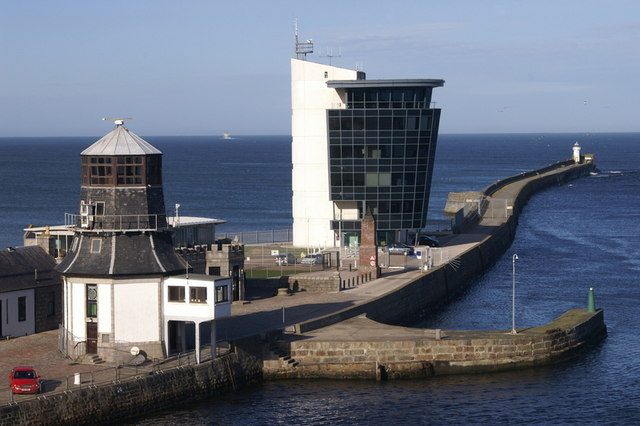
The original Navigation Control Centre in the foreground and its replacement, the Maritime Operations Centre, in the background

The former Navigation Control Centre (known as 'The Roundhouse', despite being an octagon, or as the 'Pilots House') is located at Pocra Quay. It is thought that it was constructed between 1797 and 1798, with the Shoremaster's accounts for that period indicating over £225 was spent constructing a 'new house' on the North Pier. Ten guineas were also recorded as being spent on a telescope for the 'Lookout House' on the North Pier. The building appears on a map of Footdee from 1803 and is the village's oldest.

The building's purpose was to guide vessels to the harbour, this originally being carried out by the harbour pilots using megaphone from a platform forming part of the roof of the original two-storey structure, or by a series of wicker balls attached to a mast rising from the platform. The building was extended in 1966 when the control tower section was added and in 1974 a radar system was introduced. It was updated again in 1986, when Queen Elizabeth II unveiled a plaque, commemorating '850 years of Harbour History'. The Roundhouse's role was replaced by the Marine Operations Centre in 2006, with the harbour board retaining ownership of the building and leasing it out as office space.

The building was category C listed in July 2007. It is described by Historic Environment Scotland as a rare survivor of its type, notable for its unusual octagonal form and relatively early construction date.

=== Scarty's Monument ===
Scarty's Monument is a brick obelisk located at Pocra Quay, named after a harbour pilot who kept watch during poor weather from the North Pier in the mid 19th century. Rather than being an actual monument, it is in fact a ventilator shaft for a disused sewer that discharged into the harbour navigation channel.

=== 6 Regent Road ===
6 Regent Road (also known as United House) located between the Victoria and Albert Docks, is an example of a late 19th century warehouse associated with the harbour. Once numerous around the harbour, few such warehouses now survive. Constructed from granite with a slate roof, it is three-storeys in height and features a distinctive M-shaped gable. The building was category C listed in July 2007.

=== Drainage buildings ===
A pair of public works drainage buildings dating from 1906 are situated on Mearns Quay and Torry Quay, on opposite sides of the River Dee. The two polished grey granite ashlar buildings are described by Historic Environment Scotland as being of some quality with fine Classical architectural detailing and cast-iron rainwater goods. It is also noted that functional buildings of this type with such attention to detail are rare and that they contribute significantly to the built environment of the harbour. They were category C listed in July 2007.

=== Abercrombie Jetty ===
Located at Pocra Quay adjacent to the Roundhouse, the Abercrombie Jetty (also known as the 'Catch Pier') was constructed in 1789 as part of wider harbour improvements. Its purpose was to limit waves generated by the new north pier from the entering the navigation channel. Its namesake was the Provost of the time, John Abercrombie (1729–1820). Once finished the jetty itself proved to be a significant danger to navigation, and therefore was largely removed, with only a small part remaining. A carved stone commemorating Abercrombie exists at the base of the structure.

== See also ==
- List of ports and harbours in Scotland
- List of North Sea ports
- North Sea oil and gas industry

== Bibliography ==
- Aberdeen Harbour Board (2020). Open to a World of Possibilities – Annual Review 2020/21 (PDF).
- Aberdeen City Council (2019). Aberdeen Maritime Trail – A guide to Aberdeen's maritime connections (PDF).
- Nicol, Rosie; Newman, Patricia (2012). Old Torry and Aberdeen Harbour. Stenlake Publishing. ISBN 978-1-8403-3615-3.
