= River Tyne Police =

Defunct police force

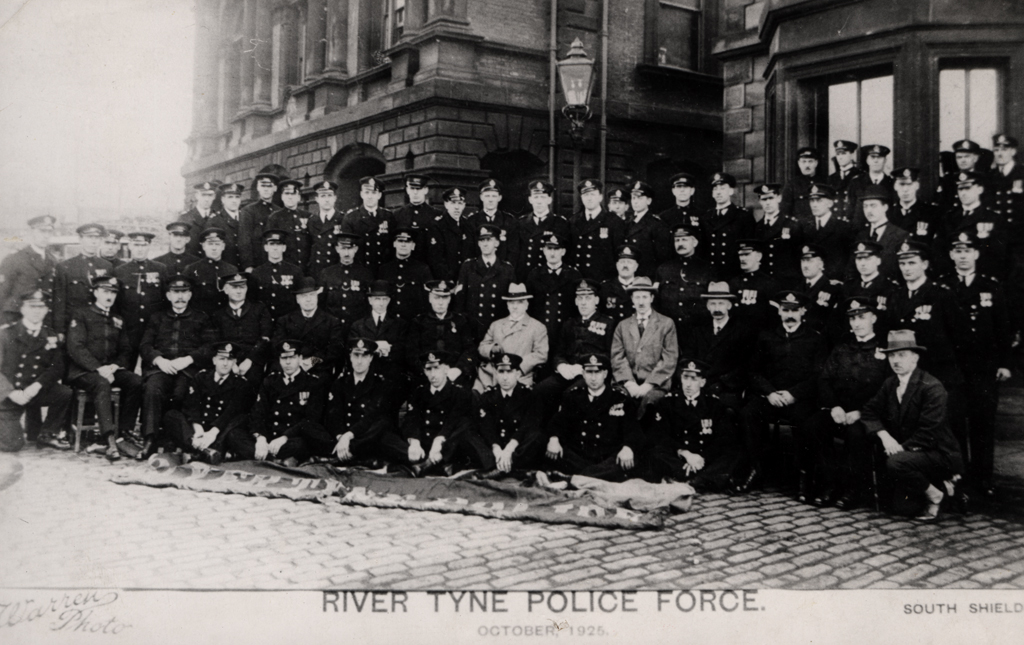
A group photograph of the force, taken in 1925

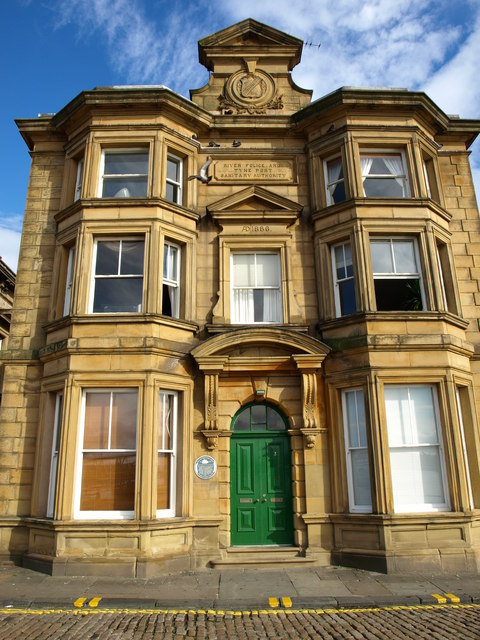
Former headquarters of the force

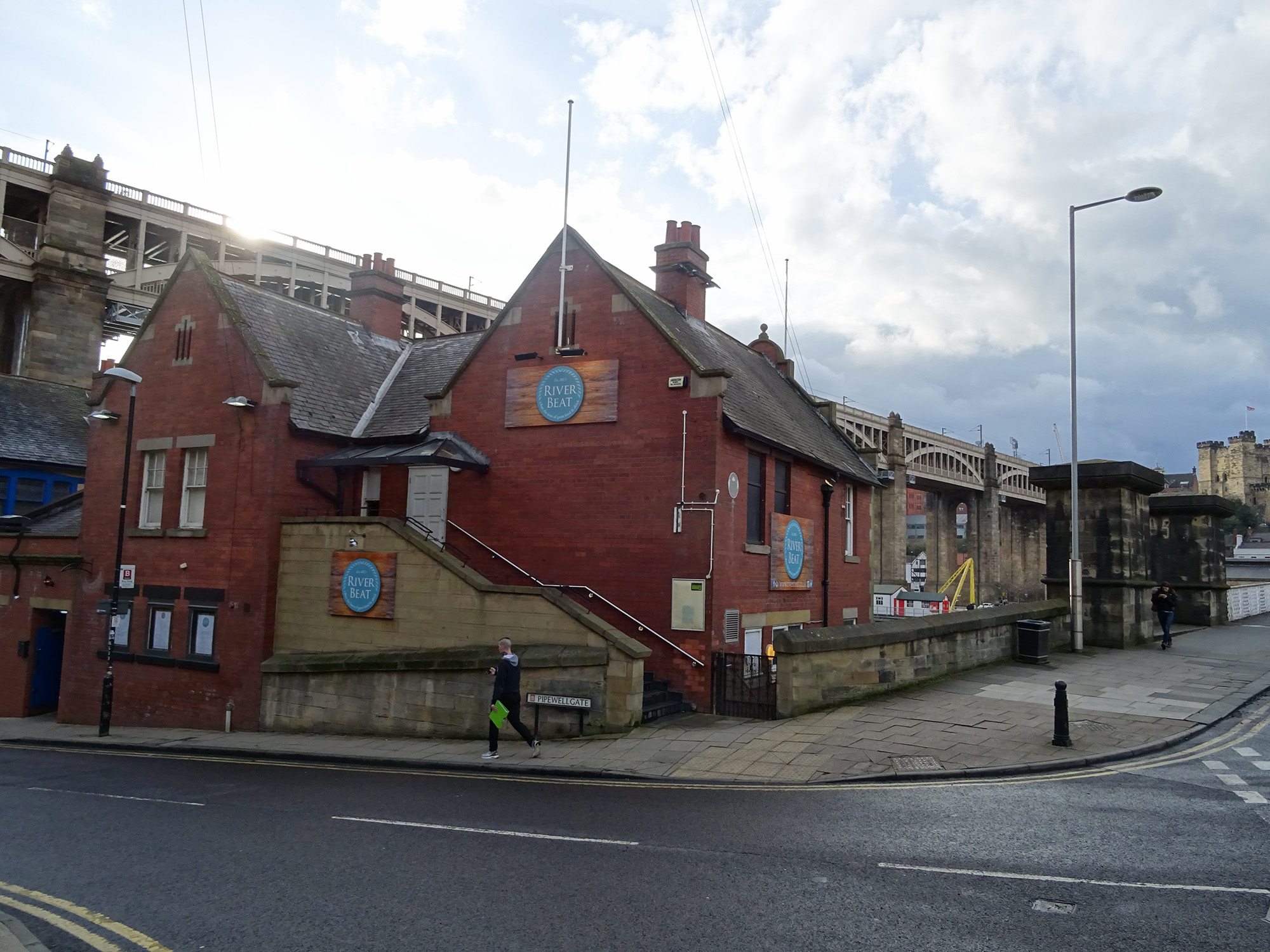
The former Pipewellgate police station

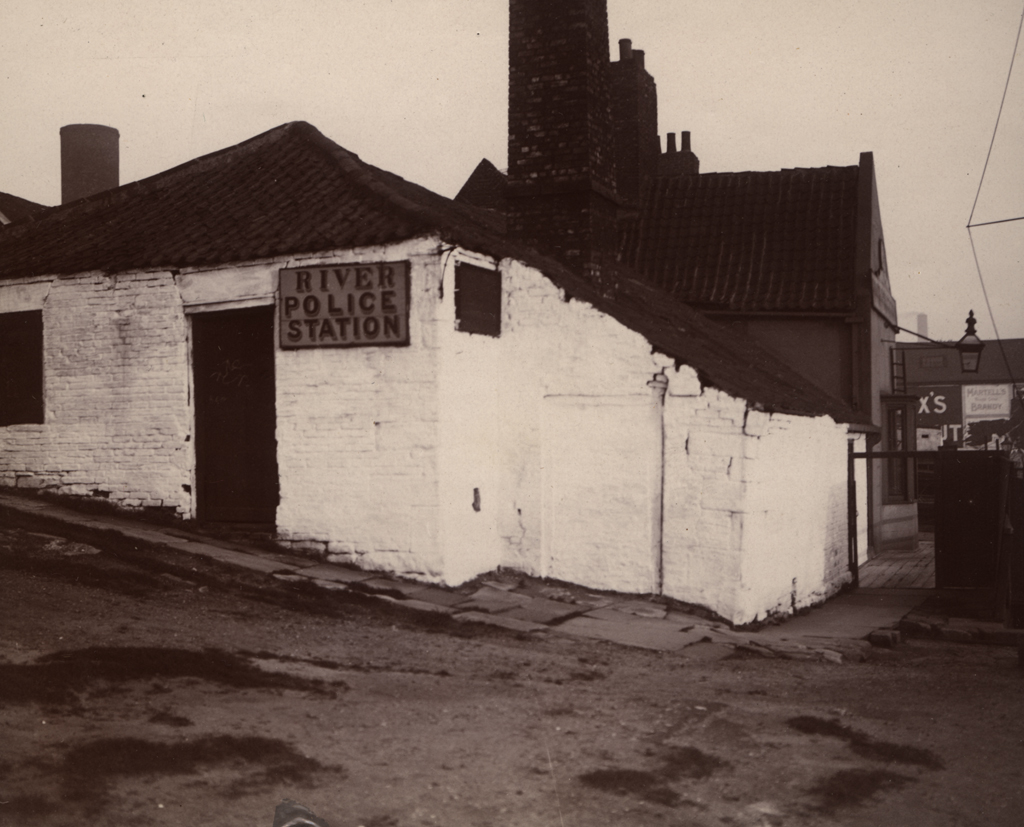
A police station of the River Police

The River Tyne Police was a police force established under the Newcastle-upon-Tyne Port Act 1845 which patrolled the River Tyne in England between 1845 and 1968.

== History ==
=== Establishment ===
The first attempt to establish a police force the river was made in May 1821, when a River Committee of the Common Council (of the Corporation of Newcastle) were requested by a group from coal merchants & ship owners from North Shields, South Shields and Newcastle to form a police force to prevent crime on the river. The Committee appointed a Superintendent, who identified 11 men to be sworn in as special constables on a trial basis, for a period of three months from June 1821. The Committee also ordered four boats for the men to use.

It seems that this effort was not entirely successful: by 1844, ship owners repeated the request. Speaking during a meeting of the Council in February 1845, Councillor Rayne said: "Twenty years ago this river police was tried at a considerable expense, he believed not less than £600 a year but it turned out not only that it was impractical for the purposes for which it was established but that those who were sent to detect thieves were often the depredators themselves".

In response to the second request, the former chief constable of Newcastle upon Tyne City Police, John Stephens, was appointed as Superintendent in August 1845, with 20 officers. The Tyne Improvement Commission was created in 1852, and the River Police were absorbed by them. The force was based at Ouseburn until a purpose built police station was eventually built at Mill Dam, South Shields in 1906. By 1910, there were two police stations in Newcastle: a floating police station off Burrell Road and another police station and 'dead house' in Wincomblee, each commanded by an inspector.

Robert Farmer was appointed as Chief Officer of the River Police in 1884, and held this position until 1902.

=== 20th century ===
The force was not included in the recommendations made by the Desborough Committee and the subsequent Police Act 1919, because it was not funded from public funds, nor was it subject to inspection by Her Majesty's Inspectorate of Constabulary. This was a matter of some consternation for local politicians: Member of Parliament for Wallsend Matt Simm asked in 1920 whether the improvements to police terms and conditions would be applied to the River Police, but Home Secretary Edward Shortt noted that although the force fell within the provisions of the Police Act 1890 in respect of police pensions, pay was a matter for the force itself and not subject to national rules. Newcastle upon Tyne East MP Harry Barnes pressed the government to apply the national regulations to the River Police, but Shortt declined.

A similar question was asked ten years later, when Leslie Hore-Belisha drew attention to the fact that the River Tyne Commissioners did not comply with the requirements of the regulations under the Police Act 1919, and the Home Office minister Alfred Short described the force as being in an "exceptional position" as it was not subject to Government inspection and did not receive a grant from the Treasury, and so recognised that it was not within the scope of the Home Office to take any further action.

=== World War II ===
During World War II, the police were involved in securing the ports and managing clearances with HM Customs and Excise. From 30 November 1949 it also took over responsibility for policing on the property of the Tyne Improvement Commission from the disbanded Tyne Improvement Commission Docks and Piers Police.

In 1956, the force had 78 officers, and an annual budget of £52,642. In 1965, the force policed the River Tyne, Albert Edward and Tyne docks and the Shields ferry. It had three stations: the headquarters at Mill Dam, South Shields, a station at Pipewellgate on the Gateshead side of the Swing Bridge, and others at Albert Edward Dock, Tyne Dock and on the North Shields Ferry Landing. The force also had a Criminal Investigation Department, who were based in the former Custom House on the Mill Dam. The strength of the force was one Chief Constable, one Chief Inspector, four Inspectors, ten uniformed Sergeants, a Detective Sergeant, 40 Constables and two Detective Constables.

In 1966, in response to a question from the Member of Parliament for Wallsend Ted Garrett, then-Home Secretary Roy Jenkins stated that he was in favour of merging the River Police with the local police force, under the Police Act 1964. On 1 August 1968, the force became part of South Shields Borough Police under the Port of Tyne Reorganisation Scheme 1967 Confirmation Order 1968, at which point it numbered 57 officers. The Borough Police merged with Durham County Constabulary on 1 October 1968 to form Durham Constabulary. In April 1974, this area came under the auspices of Northumbria Police.
