= Shore Porters Society =

Scottish moving and warehousing company

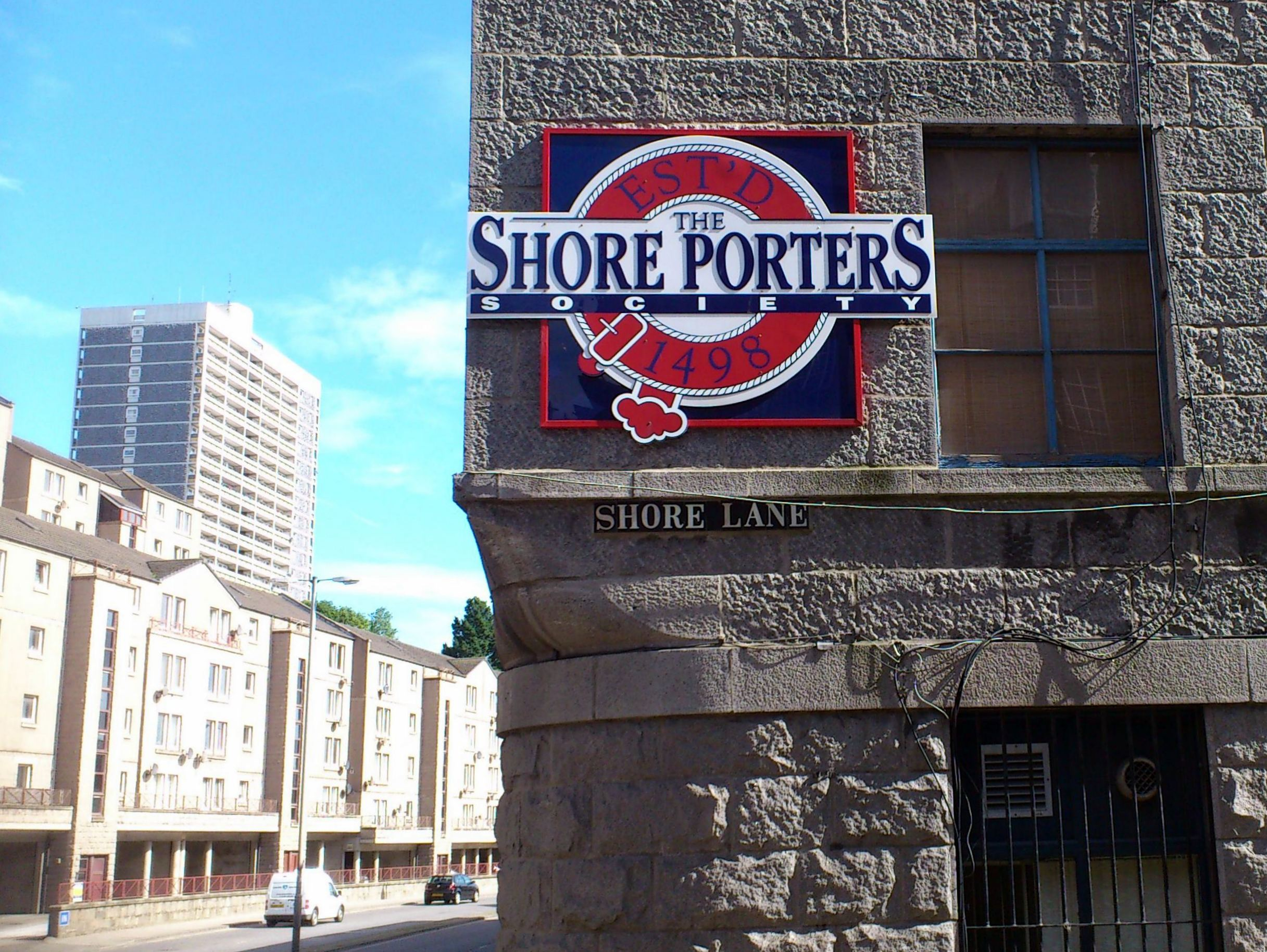
- Founded: 1498; 527 years ago
- Headquarters: Aberdeen, Scotland
- Services: Haulage, removals and storage
- Website: www.shoreporters.com

The Shore Porters Society is a removals, haulage and storage company based in Aberdeen, Scotland, established by a minute of the local council dated 22 June 1498.

The company originated as a group or co-operative of porters working in Aberdeen Harbour. In 1666, two trading units were founded, the General Haulage Department or Horse and Van Department, and the Property and Warehousing Department which provided for retired and sick members. Until the mid 19th century the society was controlled by Aberdeen Town Council. It is now an unincorporated association controlled by four partners, nine retired members and one widow.

The Society also operates under the trading name of Rumsey & Son from Richmond-upon-Thames, which was originally a family business founded in 1921. The Shore Porters Society acquired the firm in 1992 as a domestic remover in Southwest London.
