= Trust port =

UK port operated by an independent statutory authority

In the United Kingdom, a trust port is a port that is administrated as a trust by an independent statutory body set up by an act of Parliament and governed by its own set of rules and statutes. This is in contrast to a private port, which is privately owned, and a municipal port, which is owned by the local authority.

Although there are 52 trust ports in England and Wales the UK government's web page for trust ports has closed. An example of a Scottish trust port is Aberdeen Harbour Board.

Modernising Trust Ports: A Guide to Good Governance notes that:

Many of the local Acts governing the conduct of trusts and appointment of board members have remained basically unchanged since their inception and, in many cases, fall far short of what might, today, be considered open and accountable. Many boards adhere to the basic principles of the trust, discharging their duties in a conscientious open and accountable manner. However, much depends on the integrity of individual board members for, unlike a private company where the board is accountable to its shareholders, in the final analysis trust boards only need to be accountable to themselves."

A number of trust ports have been privatized under the provisions of the Ports Act 1991. The British government is considering further privatizations of trust ports in the future.

== List of trust ports ==
- Aberdeen Harbour Board
- Berwick Harbour Commissioners
- Bridlington Pier and Harbour Commissioners
- Brightlingsea Harbour Commissioners
- Caernarfon Harbour Trustees
- Cattewater Harbour Commissioners
- Chichester Harbour Conservancy
- Cowes Harbour Commissioners
- Crouch Harbour Authority
- Dart Harbour and Navigation Authority
- Falmouth Harbour Commissioners
- Flamborough North Sea Landing Harbour Commissioners
- Fowey Harbour Commissioners
- Gloucester Harbour Trustees
- Great Yarmouth Port Authority
- Harwich Haven Authority
- Hope Cove Harbour Commissioners
- King's Lynn Conservancy Board
- Lancaster Port Commissioners
- Langstone Harbour Board
- Littlehampton Harbour Board
- Lymington Harbour Commissioners
- Maldon Harbour Improvement Commissioners
- Maryport Harbour Commissioners
- Mevagissey Harbour Trustees
- Milford Haven Port Authority
- Mousehole Harbour Commissioners
- Neath Harbour Commissioners
- Newlyn Pier and Harbour Commissioners
- Newport Harbour Commissioners
- North Sunderland Harbour Commissioners
- Orford Town Trustees
- Padstow Harbour Commissioners
- Polperro Harbour Trustees
- Poole Harbour Commissioners
- Port Isaac Harbour Commissioners
- Port of Blyth
- Port of Dover
- Port of London Authority
- Port of Tyne
- Portloe Harbour Commissioners
- River Yealm Harbour Commissioners
- Sandwich Port and Haven Commissioners
- Saundersfoot Harbour Commissioners
- Shoreham Port Authority
- Sennen Cove Harbour Commissioners
- Staithes Harbour Commissioners
- Teignmouth Harbour Commissioners
- Warkworth Harbour Commissioners
- Wells Harbour Commissioners
- Whitehaven Harbour Commissioners
- Yarmouth (IOW) Harbour Commissioners

== See also ==
- Port authority
