= National Register of Historic Places listings in Parke County, Indiana =

Location of Parke County in Indiana

This is a list of the National Register of Historic Places listings in Parke County, Indiana.

This is intended to be a complete list of the properties and districts on the National Register of Historic Places in Parke County, Indiana, United States. Latitude and longitude coordinates are provided for many National Register properties and districts; these locations may be seen together in a map.

There are 47 properties and districts listed on the National Register in the county, including one National Historic Landmark. Another three properties were once listed but have been removed.

Properties and districts located in incorporated areas display the name of the municipality, while properties and districts in unincorporated areas display the name of their civil township. Properties and districts split between multiple jurisdictions display the names of all jurisdictions.

This National Park Service list is complete through NPS recent listings posted September 26, 2025.

== Current listings ==
| | Name on the Register | Image | Date listed | Location | City or town | Description |
|---|---|---|---|---|---|---|
| 1 | Arch in the Town of Marshall | Arch in the Town of Marshall | December 26, 1985 (#85003127) | Main and Guion Sts. 39°50′51″N 87°11′15″W | Marshall | |
| 2 | Beeson Bridge | Beeson Bridge | December 22, 1978 (#78003447) | East of Rockville at Billie Creek Village; 39°45′48″N 87°12′23″W | Adams Township | |
| 3 | Big Rocky Fork Bridge | Big Rocky Fork Bridge | December 22, 1978 (#78000383) | Southeast of Mansfield on Greencastle Rd. 39°40′32″N 87°06′06″W | Jackson Township | |
| 4 | Billie Creek Bridge | Billie Creek Bridge | December 22, 1978 (#78000384) | East of Rockville off U.S. Route 36 at Billie Creek Village; 39°45′41″N 87°12′23″W | Adams Township | |
| 5 | Bowsher Ford Bridge | Bowsher Ford Bridge | December 22, 1978 (#78000385) | North of Rockville; 39°55′47″N 87°21′06″W | Liberty Township | |
| 6 | Bridgeton Bridge | Bridgeton Bridge | December 22, 1978 (#78000386) | North of Bridgeton; 39°38′58″N 87°10′34″W | Raccoon Township | Arsoned in 2005 |
| 7 | Bridgeton Historic District | Bridgeton Historic District | September 4, 1992 (#92001167) | Roughly bounded by the northern bank of Big Raccoon Creek, George and Clark Sts., Mill Alley, and the alley east of Main St. at Bridgeton; 39°38′54″N 87°10′35″W | Raccoon Township | |
| 8 | Catlin Bridge | Catlin Bridge | December 22, 1978 (#78000387) | North of Rockville off U.S. Route 41; 39°47′30″N 87°14′18″W | Adams Township | |
| 9 | Conley's Ford Bridge | Conley's Ford Bridge | December 22, 1978 (#78000388) | East of Bridgeton; 39°39′34″N 87°07′59″W | Raccoon Township | |
| 10 | Cox Ford Bridge | Cox Ford Bridge | December 22, 1978 (#78000390) | North of Rockville off U.S. Route 41; 39°53′07″N 87°13′25″W | Penn Township | |
| 11 | Crooks Bridge | Crooks Bridge | December 22, 1978 (#78000391) | North of Bridgeton; 39°43′26″N 87°11′22″W | Adams Township | |
| 12 | William E. and Carolyn Davis House | | February 14, 2022 (#100007446) | 411 Jackson St. 39°45′59″N 87°13′44″W | Rockville | |
| 13 | Lancelot C. Ewbank House | Lancelot C. Ewbank House | September 26, 1988 (#88001578) | County Road 102E between 1200N and 300E, east of Tangier; 39°55′24″N 87°12′58″W | Sugar Creek Township | |
| 14 | Joseph Finney House | Joseph Finney House | December 20, 2002 (#02001564) | County Road 217, northwest of Bloomingdale; 39°51′35″N 87°16′18″W | Penn Township | |
| 15 | William B. & Laura Guthrie House | | March 4, 2020 (#100005041) | 7459 North US 41; 39°52′22″N 87°14′03″W | Bloomingdale vicinity | |
| 16 | Harry Evans Bridge | Harry Evans Bridge | December 22, 1978 (#78000392) | Southeast of Mecca off Old Greencastle Rd. 39°39′43″N 87°17′40″W | Florida Township | |
| 17 | William Hill Polygonal Barn | William Hill Polygonal Barn | April 2, 1993 (#93000186) | Academy St. 39°49′48″N 87°15′05″W | Bloomingdale | |
| 18 | Jackson Bridge | Jackson Bridge | December 22, 1978 (#78000393) | North of Rockville; 39°52′48″N 87°16′57″W | Penn Township | Longest single span covered bridge in Indiana |
| 19 | Jeffries Ford Bridge | Jeffries Ford Bridge | December 22, 1978 (#78000394) | Southwest of Bridgeton; 39°37′49″N 87°12′30″W | Raccoon Township | |
| 20 | Leatherwood Station Bridge | Leatherwood Station Bridge | December 22, 1978 (#78000397) | East of Rockville at Billie Creek Village; 39°48′54″N 87°17′56″W | Adams Township | |
| 21 | Richard Lieber Log Cabin | Richard Lieber Log Cabin | May 4, 2001 (#01000403) | Turkey Run State Park, north of Marshall; 39°53′06″N 87°12′25″W | Sugar Creek Township | |
| 22 | Lusk Home and Mill Site | Lusk Home and Mill Site | October 29, 1974 (#74000017) | Off State Road 47 in Turkey Run State Park, north of Marshall; 39°53′29″N 87°11′08″W | Sugar Creek Township | |
| 23 | Mansfield Bridge | Mansfield Bridge | December 22, 1978 (#78000399) | Off State Road 59 at Mansfield; 39°40′32″N 87°06′06″W | Jackson Township | |
| 24 | Mansfield Roller Mill | Mansfield Roller Mill | December 7, 1990 (#90001788) | Mansfield Rd. at Big Raccoon Creek at Mansfield; 39°40′37″N 87°06′06″W | Jackson Township | |
| 25 | Marshall Bridge | Marshall Bridge | December 22, 1978 (#78000400) | North of Rockville; 39°53′00″N 87°19′35″W | Liberty Township | |
| 26 | McAllister Bridge | McAllister Bridge | December 22, 1978 (#78000398) | North of Bridgeton; 39°42′34″N 87°11′30″W | Adams Township | |
| 27 | Mecca Bridge | Mecca Bridge | December 22, 1978 (#78000401) | Off U.S. Route 41; 39°43′45″N 87°19′29″W | Mecca | |
| 28 | Melcher Bridge | Melcher Bridge | December 22, 1978 (#78000402) | East of Montezuma; 39°47′20″N 87°20′06″W | Reserve Township | |
| 29 | Mill Creek Bridge | Mill Creek Bridge | December 22, 1978 (#78000403) | North of Rockville; 39°54′30″N 87°21′38″W | Liberty Township | |
| 30 | Narrows Bridge | Narrows Bridge | December 22, 1978 (#78000404) | North of Rockville off State Road 47; 39°53′28″N 87°11′07″W | Sugar Creek Township | |
| 31 | Neet Bridge | Neet Bridge | December 22, 1978 (#78000405) | North of Bridgeton; 39°42′06″N 87°11′52″W | Adams Township | |
| 32 | Nevins Bridge | Nevins Bridge | December 22, 1978 (#78000406) | Northwest of Bridgeton; 39°41′04″N 87°12′45″W | Raccoon Township | |
| 33 | Phillips Bridge | Phillips Bridge | December 22, 1978 (#78000407) | Southeast of Montezuma off U.S. Route 36; 39°46′20″N 87°19′21″W | Wabash Township | |
| 34 | Portland Mills Bridge | Portland Mills Bridge | December 22, 1978 (#78000408) | East of Marshall off State Road 47; 39°51′39″N 87°05′20″W | Greene Townshuip | Oldest covered bridge in Parke County |
| 35 | Rockville Chautauqua Pavilion | Rockville Chautauqua Pavilion | March 12, 1999 (#99000301) | College St. and Mecca Rd. 39°45′35″N 87°14′06″W | Rockville | |
| 36 | Rockville Historic District | Rockville Historic District | May 27, 1993 (#93000471) | Roughly bounded by Howard Ave. and Jefferson, High, and College Sts. 39°45′47″N 87°13′51″W | Rockville | |
| 37 | Roseville Bridge | Roseville Bridge | December 22, 1978 (#78000409) | Southeast of Mecca off Old Greencastle Rd. 39°39′09″N 87°17′37″W | Florida Township | |
| 38 | Rush Creek Bridge | Rush Creek Bridge | December 22, 1978 (#78000410) | North of Rockville; 39°53′56″N 87°18′53″W | Liberty Township | |
| 39 | Sim Smith Bridge | Sim Smith Bridge | December 22, 1978 (#78000411) | Southeast of Montezuma off U.S. Route 36; 39°46′24″N 87°19′52″W | Wabash Township | |
| 40 | State Sanitorium Bridge | State Sanitorium Bridge | December 22, 1978 (#78000412) | East of Rockville off U.S. Route 36; 39°46′52″N 87°08′42″W | Adams and Washington Townships | |
| 41 | Thorpe Ford Bridge | Thorpe Ford Bridge | December 22, 1978 (#78000413) | Southeast of Mecca on Rosedale Catlin Rd. 39°38′13″N 87°15′59″W | Florida Township | |
| 42 | Turkey Run State Park | Turkey Run State Park | March 14, 2019 (#100003505) | Roughly bounded by IN 47, Narrows, Coxford & the E-W leg of Smedley Rds. 39°43′30″N 87°19′54″W | Marshall | |
| 43 | Wabash Township Graded School | Wabash Township Graded School | June 22, 1987 (#87000950) | S. Montezuma St. 39°43′30″N 87°19′54″W | Mecca | |
| 44 | West Union Bridge | West Union Bridge | December 22, 1978 (#78000414) | North of Montezuma; 39°51′18″N 87°20′09″W | Union Township | |
| 45 | Wilkins Mill Bridge | Wilkins Mill Bridge | December 22, 1978 (#78000415) | North of Rockville off U.S. Route 41; 39°53′54″N 87°13′59″W | Sugar Creek Township | |
| 46 | W. H. York Round Barn | W. H. York Round Barn | September 16, 1993 (#93000949) | County Road 249, 0.5 miles southeast of Lodi; 39°56′39″N 87°23′44″W | Liberty | |
| 47 | Zacke Cox Bridge | Zacke Cox Bridge | December 22, 1978 (#78000416) | Southeast of Mecca off U.S. Route 41; 39°41′43″N 87°17′09″W | Florida Township | |

== Former listings ==
| | Name on the Register | Image | Date listed | Date removed | Location | City or town | Description |
|---|---|---|---|---|---|---|---|
| 1 | Coal Creek Bridge | | December 22, 1978 (#78000389) | November 30, 1992 | East of Cayuga | Cayuga | Destroyed by arsonist, June 27, 1992 |
| 2 | Jessup Bridge | | December 22, 1978 (#78000395) | February 20, 1990 | East of Rockville | Rockville | Destroyed in a storm in 1989. |
| 3 | J. H. Russell Bridge | | December 22, 1978 (#78000396) | February 20, 1990 | North of Rockville | Rockville | Torn down in 1983. |

== See also ==
- List of National Historic Landmarks in Indiana
- National Register of Historic Places listings in Indiana
- Listings in neighboring counties: Clay, Fountain, Montgomery, Putnam, Vermillion, Vigo
- List of Indiana state historical markers in Parke County
