= List of Indiana state historical markers in Parke County =

Location of Parke County in Indiana

This is a list of the Indiana state historical markers in Parke County.

This is intended to be a complete list of the official state historical markers placed in Parke County, Indiana, United States by the Indiana Historical Bureau. The locations of the historical markers and their latitude and longitude coordinates are included below when available, along with their names, years of placement, and topics as recorded by the Historical Bureau. There are 14 historical markers located in Parke County.

== Historical markers ==
| Marker title | Image | Year placed | Location | Topics |
|---|---|---|---|---|
| Wabash & Erie Canal | | 1966 | Median between U.S. Route 36 and Crawford Street near the Wabash River bridge in Montezuma; 39°47′33.6″N 87°22′22″W | Transportation, Business, Industry, and Labor |
| Armiesburg | | 1966 | Western side of Lafayette Road (County Road 600W) south of U.S. Route 36 and north of Armiesburg; 39°46′13″N 87°21′4.5″W | Military, Historic District, Neighborhoods, and Towns, Early Settlement and Exploration |
| Roseville | | 1966 | Along the Mecca-Roseville Road by the Roseville Covered Bridge near Coxville; 39°39′6.6″N 87°17′39″W | Historic District, Neighborhoods, and Towns, Early Settlement and Exploration |
| Boyhood home of J.G. "Uncle Joe" Cannon | | 1966 | County Road 50W at the southern edge of Annapolis, 1 mile north of Bloomingdale; 39°51′0″N 87°14′59.6″W | Politics |
| 10 O'Clock Line | | 1968 | Along U.S. Route 41, 4 miles south of Rockville at a church and the junction of W. Mecca Road and County Road 325W; 39°43′51″N 87°18′0″W | American Indian/Native American, Early Settlement and Exploration |
| 10 O'Clock Line | | 1968 | Northern side of the covered bridge and dam in northern Bridgeton; 39°39′2″N 87°10′34″W | American Indian/Native American, Early Settlement and Exploration |
| Mansfield circa 1820 | | 1968 | West of the covered bridge in Mansfield; 39°40′35″N 87°6′9″W | Historic District, Neighborhoods, and Towns |
| Turkey Run | | 1968 | Southern side of State Road 47 at the entrance to Turkey Run State Park; 39°52′55″N 87°12′7″W | Nature and Natural Disasters, Early Settlement and Exploration |
| Dennis Hall | | 1970 | Across from the Quaker meetinghouse on the southern edge of Bloomingdale; 39°49′50.7″N 87°15′6″W | Education, Religion |
| [Parke County Museum] | | 1975 | Southern side of Ohio Street, 2 blocks east of the intersection of U.S. Routes 36 and 41 in Rockville; 39°45′44″N 87°14′0″W | Arts and Culture, Buildings and Architecture |
| Portland Mills Covered Bridge | | 1998 | Along County Road 650N southwest of Waveland; 39°51′39″N 87°5′20″W | Transportation, Buildings and Architecture |
| Rockville Chautauqua Pavilion | | 2001 | Beechwood Park at the junction of W. Pennsylvania and S. College Streets in southwestern Rockville; 39°45′34″N 87°14′6″W | Buildings and Architecture, Special Events |
| Christmas (Noel) Dagenet | | 2004 | Western side of Lafayette Road (County Road 600W), 0.25 miles north of Armiesburg; 39°45′47″N 87°21′4.6″W | Politics, American Indian/Native American |
| Juliet V. Strauss | | 2012 | 514 N. College St., Rockville; 39°46′02″N 87°14′03″W | Arts & Culture; Newspaper & Media |

== See also ==
- List of Indiana state historical markers
- National Register of Historic Places listings in Parke County, Indiana
