= Mansfield Village =

Mansfield Village may refer to:

- Mansfield Center, Connecticut
- Mansfield, Indiana
