= Jackson Township, Parke County, Indiana =

Jackson Township
- Township
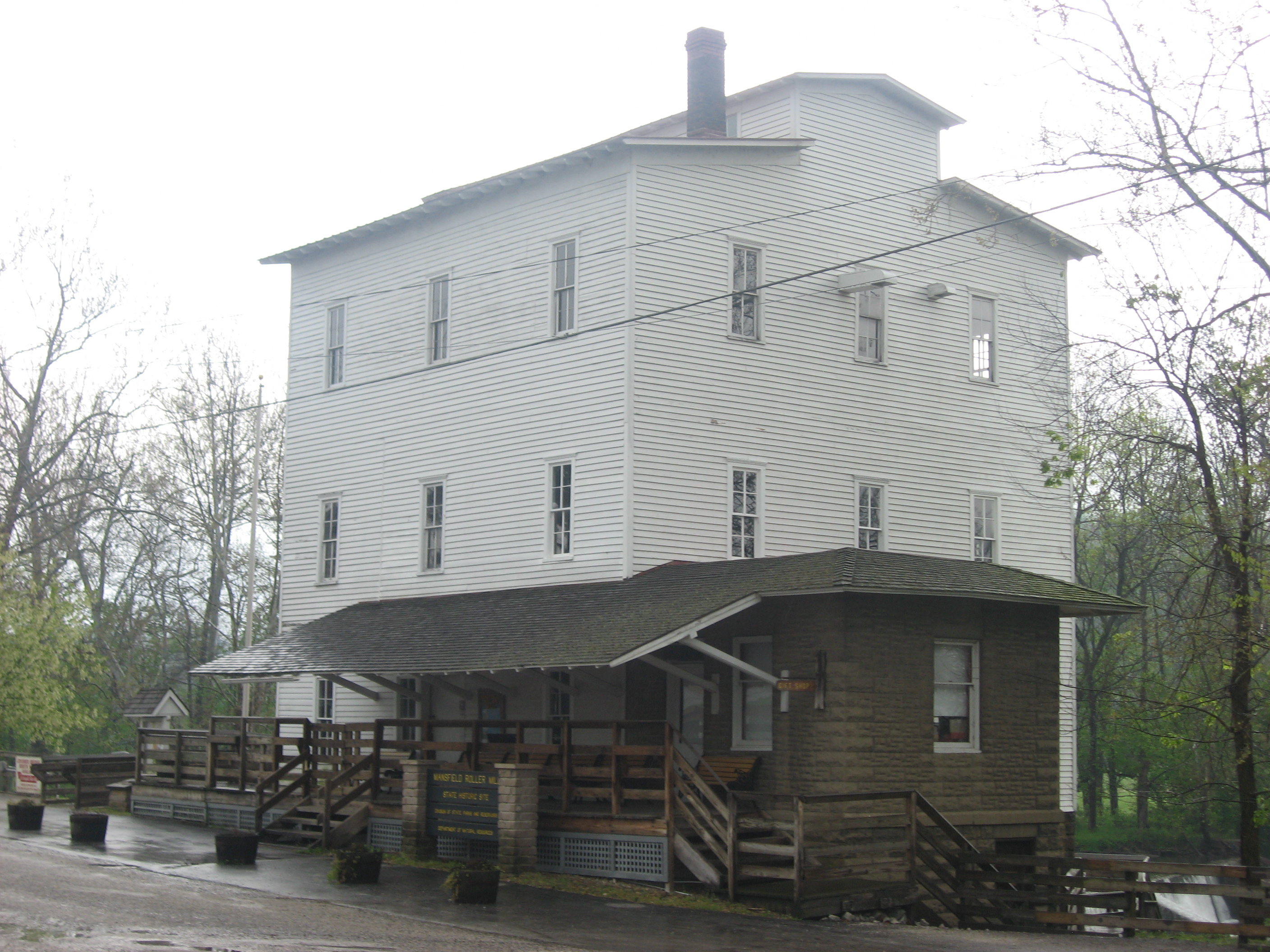
- The historic roller mill in Mansfield

- Location in Parke County
- Coordinates: 39°38′57″N 87°03′39″W
- Country: United States
- State: Indiana
- County: Parke

Government
  - Type: Indiana township

Area
  - Total: 35.76 sq mi (92.6 km^{2})
  - Land: 35.57 sq mi (92.1 km^{2})
  - Water: 0.19 sq mi (0.49 km^{2}) 0.53%
- Elevation: 614 ft (187 m)

Population (2020)
  - Total: 711
  - Density: 20.0/sq mi (7.72/km^{2})
- Time zone: UTC-5 (Eastern (EST))
  - Summer (DST): UTC-4 (EDT)
- ZIP codes: 46135, 47834, 47837, 47872
- Area code: 765
- GNIS feature ID: 453460

Jackson Township is one of thirteen townships in Parke County, Indiana, United States. As of the 2020 census, its population was 711 and it contained 427 housing units.

Historical population
Census	Pop.	Note	%±
1890	1,506		—
1900	1,442		−4.2%
1910	1,157		−19.8%
1920	1,038		−10.3%
1930	771		−25.7%
1940	855		10.9%
1950	712		−16.7%
1960	580		−18.5%
1970	549		−5.3%
1980	669		21.9%
1990	667		−0.3%
2000	758		13.6%
2010	737		−2.8%
2020	711		−3.5%
Source: US Decennial Census

== History ==
Jackson Township was named for Andrew Jackson, 7th President of the United States.

The Big Rocky Fork Covered Bridge, Mansfield Covered Bridge, and Mansfield Roller Mill are listed on the National Register of Historic Places.

== Geography ==
According to the 2010 census, the township has a total area of 35.76 square miles (92.6 km^{2}), of which 35.57 square miles (92.1 km^{2}) (or 99.47%) is land and 0.19 square miles (0.49 km^{2}) (or 0.53%) is water.

=== Unincorporated towns ===
- Lena at 39.6050417°N 87.1072365°W
- Mansfield at 39.676431°N 87.102236°W

(This list is based on USGS data and may include former settlements.)

=== Cemeteries ===
The township contains these two cemeteries: Jacks and Moore.

=== Major highways ===
- Indiana State Road 59

=== Lakes ===
- Alma Lake
- Rocky Fork Lake

== School districts ==
- Clay Community Schools

== Political districts ==
- State House District 44
- State Senate District 38
