= Nevins Covered Bridge =

Place in Indiana listed on National Register of Historic Places

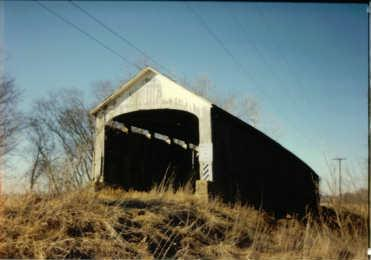
- Nevins Covered Bridge
- Coordinates: 39°41′4.82″N 87°12′44.43″W
- Carries: C.R. 130E
- Crosses: Little Raccoon Creek
- Locale: Parke County, Indiana, United States
- Official name: Nevins Covered Bridge
- Named for: Thomas Levi Nevins
- Maintained by: Parke County
- NBI Number: 6100028

Characteristics
- Design: National Register of Historic Places
- Total length: 169 ft (52 m)155ft +7ft overhangs on each end
- Width: 16 ft (4.9 m)
- Height: 13 ft (4.0 m)

History
- Constructed by: Britton, J.A.
- Built: 1920
- Nevins Covered Bridge
- U.S. National Register of Historic Places
- MPS: Parke County Covered Bridges TR
- NRHP reference No.: 78000406
- Added to NRHP: Dec 22, 1978

Location
- Interactive map of Nevins Covered Bridge

The Nevins Covered Bridge is a single span Burr Arch Truss covered bridge that crosses Little Raccoon Creek on County Road 130 East, just southeast of Catlin, Indiana. It was built in 1920 by Joseph A. Britton and Son. Prior to the reconstruction of the Bridgeton Bridge in 2006, the Nevins Bridge was the newest covered bridge in Parke County.

It was added to the National Register of Historic Places in 1978.

== History ==
The bridge was built at Gilkerson's Ford. Thomes Gilkerson had moved to the area in 1821 from Mercer County, Kentucky. In 1823 he built a mill near the ford that would later bear his name. The Gilkersons worked as blacksmiths, carpenters, farmers and millers and a small community soon sprang up around their business. In 1824 the Gilkerson's community, near the ford, was nominated for the county seat of Parke County but lost out to Rockville. From 1839 to 1846 they built several flatboats that would be sent down the Little Raccoon to the Big Raccoon and eventually to the Wabash during the spring freshets. Thomas Levi Nevins, born in 1869, later bought the Gilkerson property in 1897. This is who the Nevins Bridge is named for. He studied the mill and preserved the relics from the mill. By 1906 he was part owner of the Bloomingdale Mill and in 1910 he rebuilt the flour mill in Rosedale on the foundations of the older mill that had burned down. However, in 1911, after only 18 months of operation, this mill burned down too. He is also remembered as a school teacher in the nearby village of Minshall.

Elmer Gerard had won the bid in 1915 to build the Bowsher Ford Covered Bridge but he actually had J.A. Britton's son Eugene Britton build the bridge. Joseph A. Britton and Elmer Gerard had both submitted bids for this bridge. Britton won the contract for the Nevins bridge, but again, Eugene was probably the major contributor much like he might have been if Elmer Gerard had won the bid. The building of the Nevins Covered Bridge closed an era in covered bridge building. This bridge was the last bridge built to be credited to Joseph A. Britton, he was 83, he would live to be 91. It was also the last of the historical covered bridges built in Parke County.

== See also ==
- List of Registered Historic Places in Indiana
- Parke County Covered Bridges
- Parke County Covered Bridge Festival
