= Sugar Creek Township, Parke County, Indiana =

Sugar Creek Township
- Township
- Location in Parke County
- Coordinates: 39°55′32″N 87°12′29″W
- Country: United States
- State: Indiana
- County: Parke

Government
  - Type: Indiana township

Area
  - Total: 24.91 sq mi (64.5 km^{2})
  - Land: 24.89 sq mi (64.5 km^{2})
  - Water: 0.02 sq mi (0.052 km^{2}) 0.08%
- Elevation: 679 ft (207 m)

Population (2020)
  - Total: 308
  - Density: 12.4/sq mi (4.78/km^{2})
- Time zone: UTC-5 (Eastern (EST))
  - Summer (DST): UTC-4 (EDT)
- ZIP codes: 47832, 47859, 47952
- Area code: 765
- GNIS feature ID: 453884

Sugar Creek Township is one of thirteen townships in Parke County, Indiana, United States. As of the 2020 census, its population was 308 and it contained 139 housing units. The township includes the north half of Turkey Run State Park.

Historical population
Census	Pop.	Note	%±
1890	789		—
1900	830		5.2%
1910	680		−18.1%
1920	554		−18.5%
1930	399		−28.0%
1940	496		24.3%
1950	350		−29.4%
1960	350		0.0%
1970	265		−24.3%
1980	292		10.2%
1990	300		2.7%
2000	349		16.3%
2010	322		−7.7%
2020	308		−4.3%
Source: US Decennial Census

== History ==
Sugar Creek Township was established in 1855.

The Lancelot C. Ewbank House, Richard Lieber Log Cabin, Lusk Home and Mill Site, Narrows Covered Bridge, and Wilkins Mill Covered Bridge are listed on the National Register of Historic Places.

== Geography ==
According to the 2010 census, the township has a total area of 24.91 square miles (64.5 km^{2}), of which 24.89 square miles (64.5 km^{2}) (or 99.92%) is land and 0.02 square miles (0.052 km^{2}) (or 0.08%) is water.

=== Unincorporated towns ===
- Grange Corner at 39.940042°N 87.185844°W
- Lusks Mills at 39.893930°N 87.181400°W

(This list is based on USGS data and may include former settlements.)

=== Cemeteries ===
The township contains these two cemeteries: Bristleridge and Cashatt.

=== Major highways ===
- U.S. Route 41

== School districts ==
- North Central Parke Community School Corporation
- Formerly: Turkey Run Community School Corporation

== Political districts ==
- State House District 42
- State Senate District 38
