= J. A. Britton =

American architect

Joseph Albert Britton
- Born: 1839; Rockville, Indiana
- Died: 1929 (aged 89–90)
- Occupation: Bridge builder

Joseph Albert Britton (1839–1929), most commonly known as J.A. Britton, was a builder of bridges in Indiana. He created many works that survive and are listed on the U.S. National Register of Historic Places.

== Biography ==
According to a Historic American Engineering Record record, Britton was born in 1839 near Rockville, Indiana. He learned carpentry from his father, but began his career as an attorney with a practice in Lawrence, Kansas. In 1879 he returned to Parke County and switched his focus to carpentry and bridgebuilding. After Britton's primary regional competitor J. J. Daniels retired in 1904, Britton was engaged to build most of the bridges in Parke County between 1904 and 1917.

Throughout his 33-year bridgebuilding career Britton built approximately 40 bridges in three Indiana counties: Parke, Putnam, and Vermillion.

=== Work credits ===
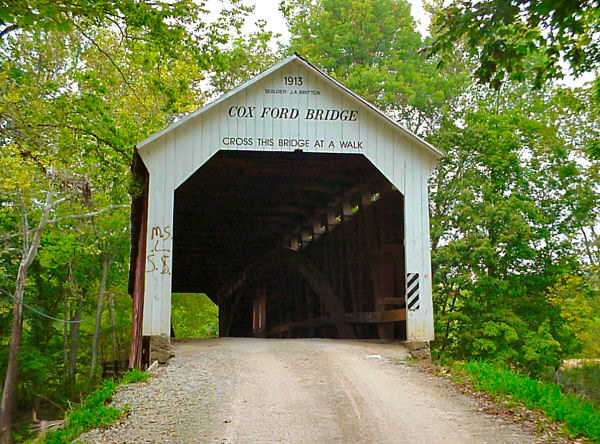
Cox Ford Bridge

Works (credit) include:

- Cox Ford Bridge, N of Rockville off US 41, Rockville, IN (Britton, J. A.), NRHP-listed
- Harry Evans Bridge, SE of Mecca off Old Greencastle Rd., Mecca, IN (Britton, J. A.), NRHP-listed
- Jeffries Ford Bridge, SW of Bridgeton, Bridgeton, IN (Britton, J. A.), NRHP-listed
- Leatherwood Station Bridge, E of Montezuma, Montezuma, IN (Britton, J. A.), NRHP-listed
- Lusk Home and Mill Site, Off IN 47 in Turkey Run State Park, Marshall, IN (Britton, J.A.), NRHP-listed
- Marshall Bridge, N of Rockville, Rockville, IN (Britton, J. A.), NRHP-listed
- McAllister Bridge, N of Bridgeton, Bridgeton, IN (Britton, J. A.), NRHP-listed

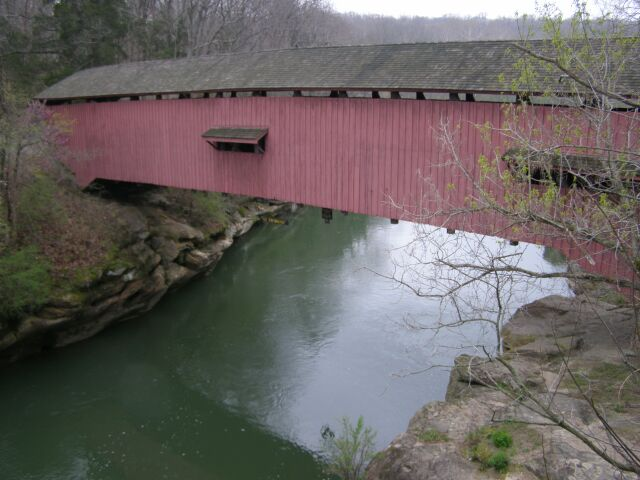
Narrows Bridge (Indiana)

- Narrows Bridge (Indiana), N of Rockville Off IN 47, Rockville, IN (Britton, J. A.), NRHP-listed
- Nevins Bridge, NW of Bridgeton, Bridgeton, IN (Britton, J. A. & Son), NRHP-listed
- Phillips Bridge, SE of Montezuma off US 36, Montezuma, IN (Britton, J. A.), NRHP-listed
- Sim Smith Bridge, SE of Montezuma off US 36, Montezuma, IN (Britton, J. A.), NRHP-listed
- State Sanitorium Bridge, E of Rockville off US 36, Rockville, IN (Britton, J. A.), NRHP-listed
- Thorpe Ford Bridge, SE of Mecca on Rosedale Catlin Rd., Mecca, IN (Britton, J. A.), NRHP-listed
- Zacke Cox Bridge, SE of Mecca off US 41, Mecca, IN (Britton, J. A.), NRHP-listed

== Family ==
J. A. Britton's son, Eugene Britton, built the Bowsher Ford Covered Bridge, a single span Burr Arch truss covered bridge structure, in 1915. On February 18, 1909, Eugene Britton was elected a director of the newly formed National Reserve Bank of the City of New York.
