= Mansfield Covered Bridge =

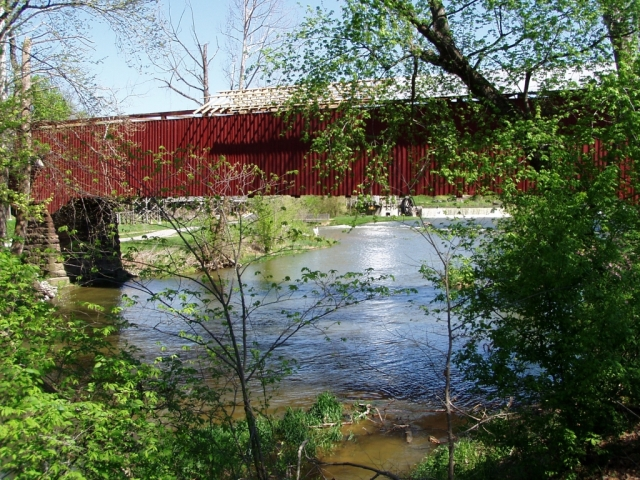
- Mansfield Covered Bridge
- Coordinates: 39°40′32.25″N 87°6′6.4″W
- Carries: Martin Road (C.R. 145)
- Crosses: Big Raccoon Creek
- Locale: Mansfield, Indiana, United States
- Official name: Mansfield Covered Bridge
- Named for: Mansfield, Indiana
- Maintained by: Parke County
- NBI Number: 6100089

Characteristics
- Design: National Register of Historic Places
- Total length: 279 ft (85 m)247ft +16ft overhangs on each end
- Width: 16 ft (4.9 m)
- Height: 14 ft (4.3 m)
- Load limit: 10 tons

History
- Constructed by: J. J. Daniels
- Built: September 4, 1867
- Rebuilt: 1990
- Mansfield Covered Bridge
- U.S. National Register of Historic Places
- MPS: Parke County Covered Bridges TR
- NRHP reference No.: 78000399
- Added to NRHP: Dec 22, 1978

Location
- Interactive map of Mansfield Covered Bridge

The Mansfield Covered Bridge is a double Burr Arch double span truss bridge located on Mansfield Road (historic) and Big Raccoon Creek in Mansfield southeast of Rockville in Parke County, Indiana. Built by Joseph J. Daniels in 1867 at a cost of $12,200, it is the second longest covered bridge still standing in Parke County, at 279 ft (85 m). Designated as a historic site by the National Register of Historic Places, the bridge rests on land provided by the Indiana Department of Natural Resources of Parke County and is open to the public all year.

== History ==
Built for a time during which only wagons, horses and pedestrians used the bridge, the Mansfield Bridge has a 10-short-ton (9.1 t) load limit. The bridge had been used for State Route 59 and in one recorded story, three loaded oil trucks approached the bridge together. The first truck stalled out just before leaving the bridge, and all three trucks came to a stop on the two spans. There was no apparent damage to the strong structure. The arches combined with the truss are able to support more weight than needed so the limit is in the decking and material used for it.

Mansfield Bridge was closed in 1980 for repair to the abutments, roof and decking. The roof and decks were replaced again in October 1990 by the Parke County Highway Department.

It was added to the National Register of Historic Places in 1978.

== Gallery ==
The Mansfield Covered Bridge

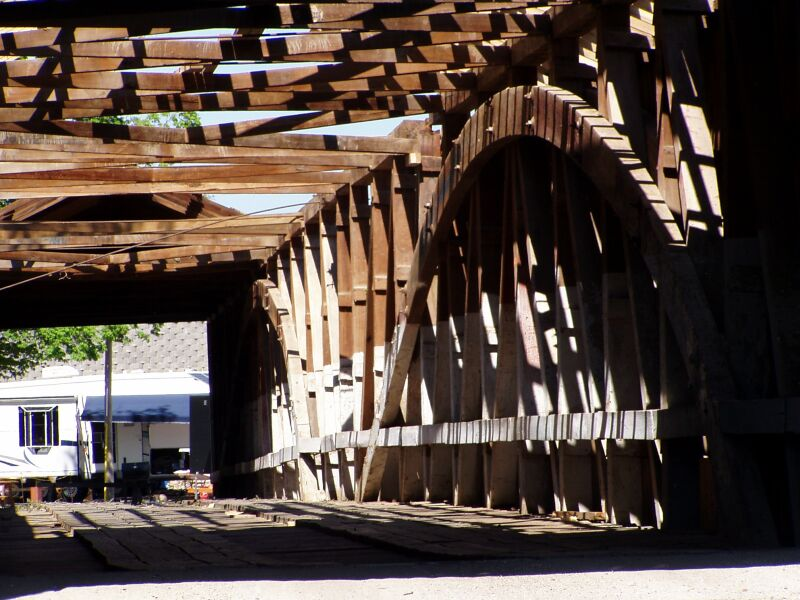
Detail of Burr Arches and double span are visible because of the sunlight coming through the missing roof after 2006 storm

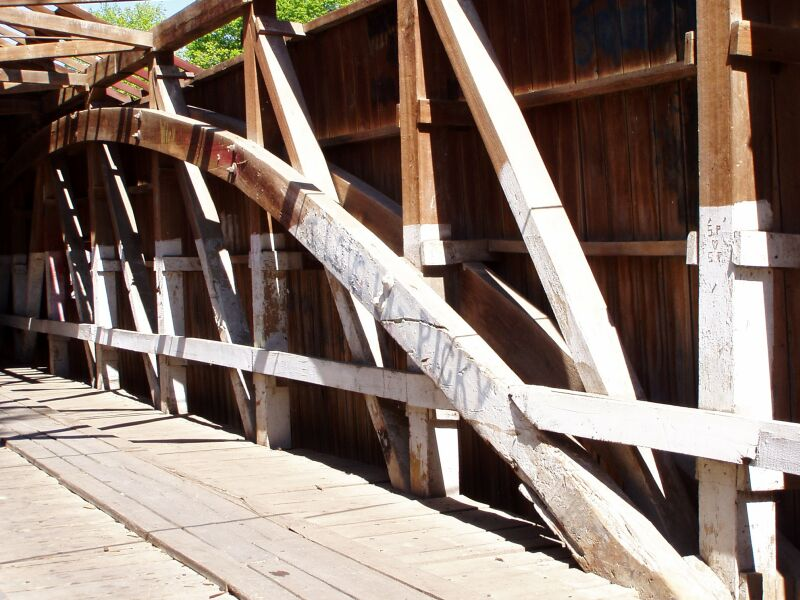
Close-up of Double Burr Arches with roof missing after 2006 storm

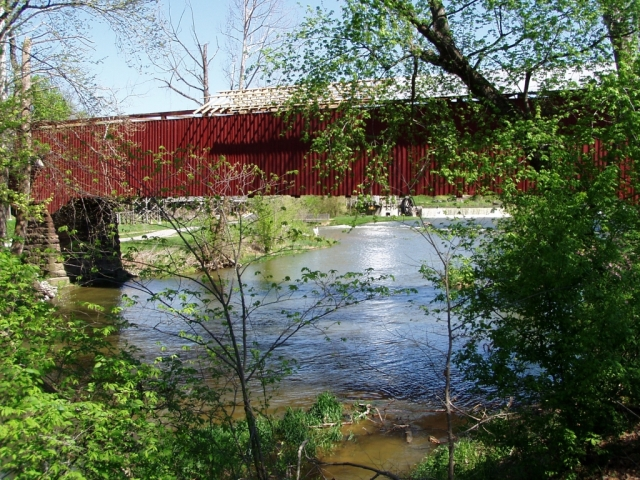
Roof restoration has begun after a spring 2006 storm removed over 50% of the roof

== See also ==
- Big Rocky Fork Covered Bridge
- Mansfield Roller Mill
- Pleasant Valley Cemetery
- Parke County Covered Bridges
- List of bridges documented by the Historic American Engineering Record in Indiana
- List of Registered Historic Places in Indiana
- Parke County Covered Bridge Festival
