= Big Rocky Fork Covered Bridge =

Place in Indiana listed on National Register of Historic Places

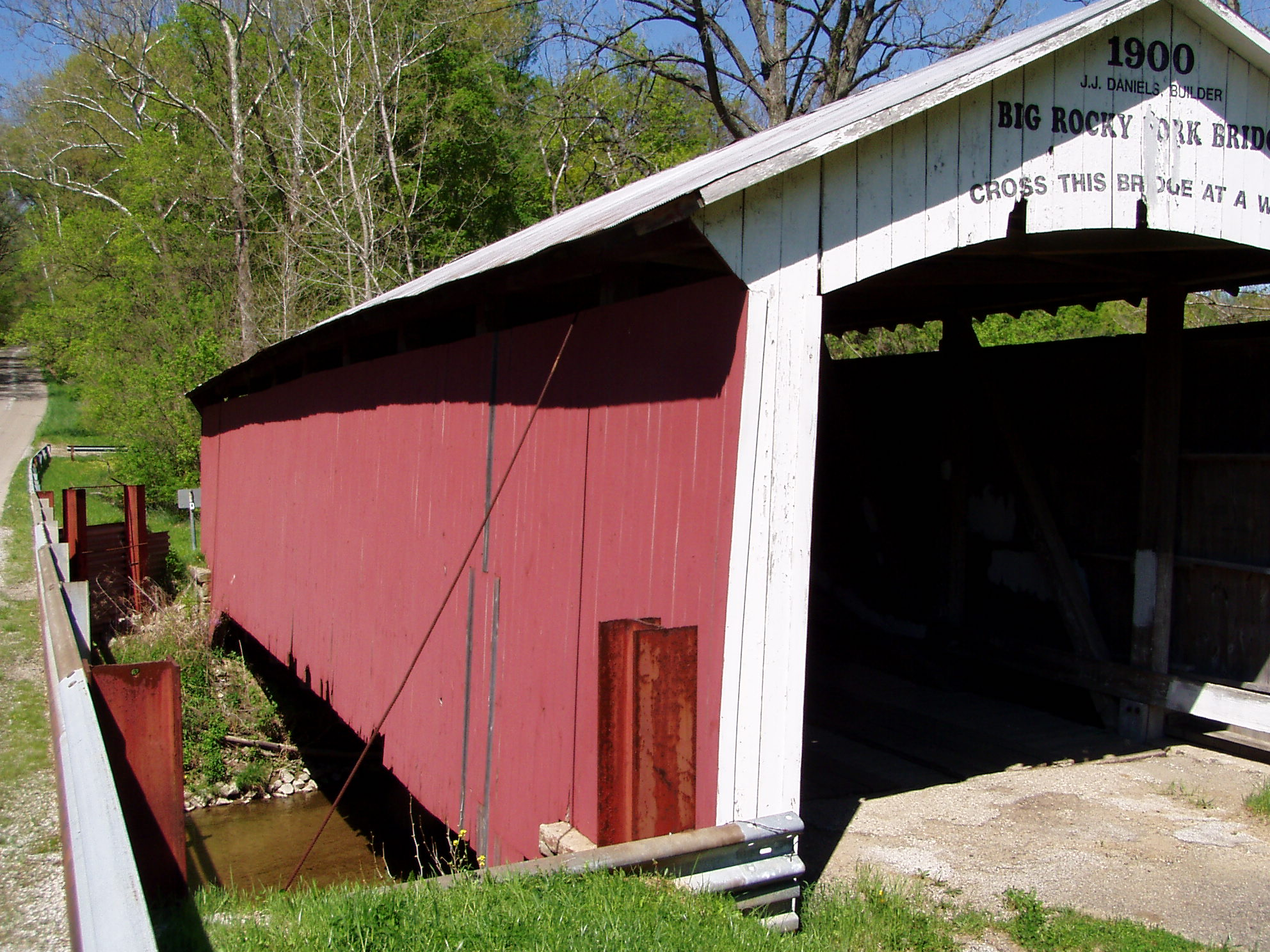
- Big Rocky Fork Covered Bridge
- Coordinates: 39°39′46.5″N 87°4′50.5″W
- Carries: C.R. 720 (Greencastle Road) (Bypassed 1987)
- Crosses: Big Rocky Fork Creek
- Locale: 1 mi (1.6 km) southeast of Mansfield in Jackson Township, Parke County, Indiana
- Official name: Big Rocky Fork Bridge
- Other name: Murphy Bridge
- Named for: Big Rocky Fork Creek
- Maintained by: Parke County Park Department
- WGCB #: 14-61-01

Characteristics
- Design: Burr arch truss bridge
- Material: Hewn limestone block (foundations)
- Trough construction: Wood
- Total length: 88 ft (26.8 m) (includes 8 ft (2.4 m) overhang on each end)
- Width: 16 ft (4.9 m)
- Longest span: 72 ft (21.9 m)
- No. of spans: 1
- Clearance above: 13 ft (4.0 m)

History
- Construction cost: $1,475
- Big Rocky Fork Covered Bridge (#6)
- U.S. National Register of Historic Places
- U.S. Historic district – Contributing property
- Location within Parke County, Indiana Location within Indiana Location within the United States
- Built: 7 September 1900
- Built by: J. J. Daniels
- Website: Big Rocky Fork Covered Bridge
- Part of: Parke County Covered Bridges TR (ID64000193)
- NRHP reference No.: 78000383
- Added to NRHP: December 22, 1978

Location
- Interactive map of Big Rocky Fork Covered Bridge

The Big Rocky Fork Covered Bridge is located 1 mile (1.6 km) southeast of Mansfield, Indiana, on County Road 720 and about 2 miles (3.2 km) east of State Road 59, in Parke County.

== Construction ==
The length of the bridge is 88 feet (27 m) which includes the 8-foot (2.4 m) overhang at each end. This single span Burr Arch Truss structure was finished on September 7, 1900, by J. J. Daniels, for $1,475.50, and named for the creek that it crosses. The foundations is built from hewn limestone blocks.

== History ==
The road bypassed this structure in 1987. Though no historical marker is in place, the Big Rocky Fork Covered Bridge was added to the National Register of Historic Places in 1978. The area around this bridge was known to be a favorite hideout for the infamous John Dillinger.

== See also ==
- Mansfield Covered Bridge
- Mansfield Roller Mill
- Pleasant Valley Cemetery
- Parke County Covered Bridges
- List of Registered Historic Places in Indiana
- Parke County Covered Bridge Festival
