= Grange Corner, Parke County, Indiana =

Unincorporated community in Indiana, United States

Grange Corner
- Unincorporated community
- Parke County's location in Indiana

- Location in Parke County
- Coordinates: 39°56′24″N 87°11′09″W
- Country: United States
- State: Indiana
- County: Parke
- Township: Sugar Creek
- Elevation: 702 ft (214 m)
- Time zone: UTC-5 (Eastern (EST))
  - Summer (DST): UTC-4 (EDT)
- ZIP code: 47859
- Area code: 765
- GNIS feature ID: 435312

Grange Corner is an unincorporated community in Sugar Creek Township, Parke County, in the U.S. state of Indiana.

== History ==
The community derives its name from the National Grange.

== Geography ==
Grange Corner is located at 39°56′24″N 87°11′09″W at an elevation of 702 feet.
