= Lena, Indiana =

Unincorporated town in Indiana, United States

- Unincorporated town
- Parke County's location in Indiana

- Location in Parke County
- Coordinates: 39°36′22.6″N 87°2′11.5″W
- Country: United States
- State: Indiana
- County: Parke
- Township: Jackson
- Elevation: 750 ft (230 m)
- Time zone: UTC-5 (Eastern (EST))
  - Summer (DST): UTC-4 (EDT)
- ZIP code: 47834
- Area code: 765
- GNIS feature ID: 437775

Lena is an unincorporated town in southern Jackson Township, Parke County, in the U.S. state of Indiana. A portion of Lena also extends into Clay County, just north of Carbon. This portion of Lena is referred to as Marysville.

== History ==
Lena was platted in 1870 when the railroad was extended to that point; by 1913 it had a population of around 300. A post office was established at Lena in 1880, and remained in operation until it was discontinued in 1936.
