= Mecca, Indiana =

- Town
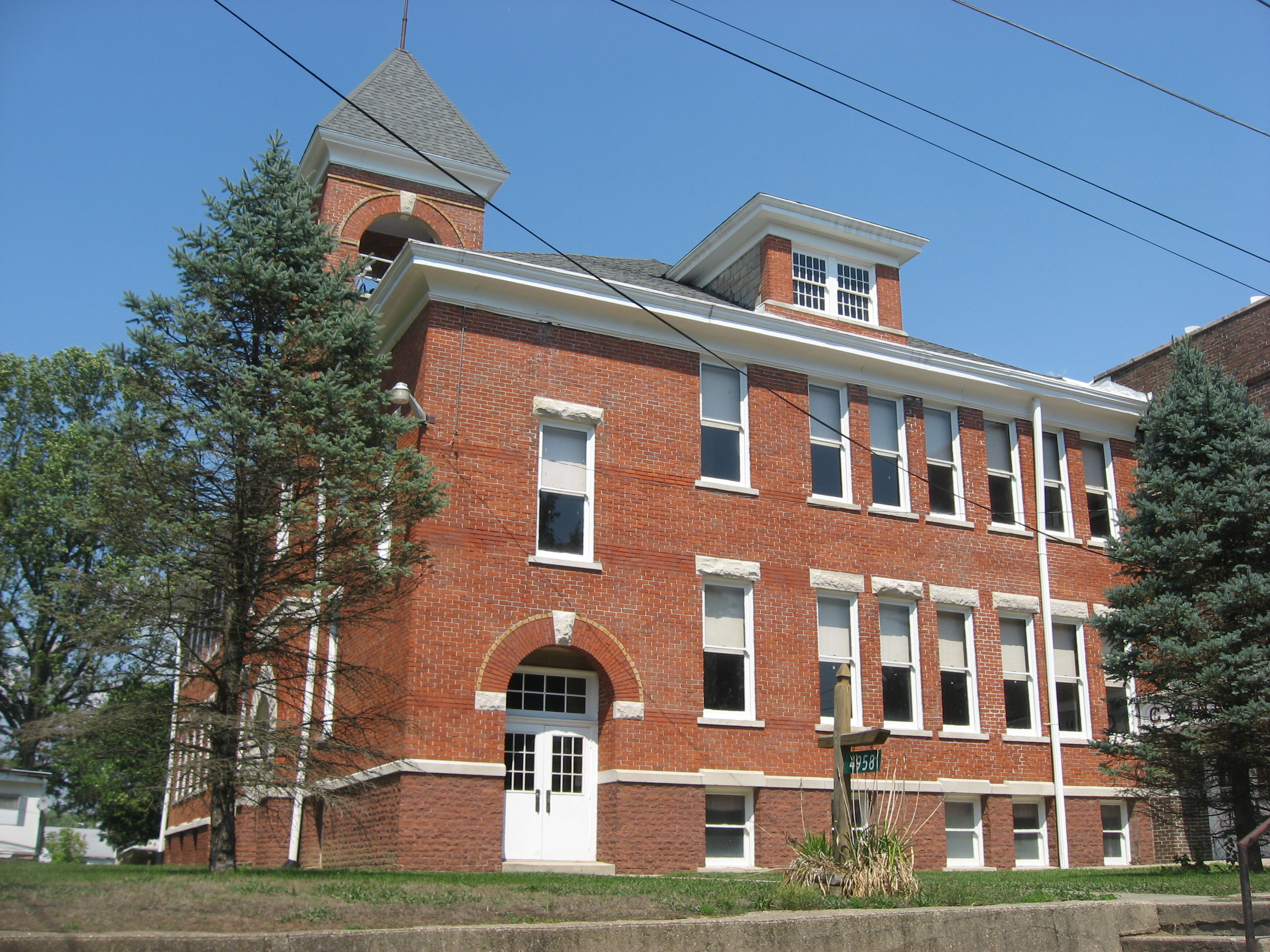
- The town's historic Wabash Township Graded School

- Location of Mecca in Parke County, Indiana.

- Detailed map of Mecca
- Coordinates: 39°43′38″N 87°19′54″W
- Country: United States
- State: Indiana
- County: Parke
- Township: Wabash

Area
  - Total: 0.39 sq mi (1.02 km^{2})
  - Land: 0.39 sq mi (1.02 km^{2})
  - Water: 0 sq mi (0.00 km^{2})
- Elevation: 525 ft (160 m)

Population (2020)
  - Total: 263
  - Density: 669.5/sq mi (258.51/km^{2})
- Time zone: UTC-5 (Eastern (EST))
  - Summer (DST): UTC-4 (EDT)
- ZIP code: 47860
- Area code: 765
- FIPS code: 18-48132
- GNIS feature ID: 2396746

Mecca is a town in Wabash Township, Parke County, in the U.S. state of Indiana. As of the 2020 census, Mecca had a population of 263.

== History ==
The town of Mecca was platted on August 7, 1890, by Samuel Hixon and his friend Tom L. McCune. As of 1913, its population was about 1,400.

A post office has been in operation at Mecca since 1888.

The Mecca Covered Bridge and Wabash Township Graded School are listed on the National Register of Historic Places.

== Geography ==
Mecca is located along the Big Raccoon Creek in the southeastern part of the county, about 6 miles (9.7 km) west-southwest of the county seat of Rockville. The main part of the town is on the west side of the creek, but a portion is on the east side; the Mecca Covered Bridge crosses the creek here. The Wabash River lies about 2 miles (3.2 km) to the west. U.S. Route 41 passes with 0.5 miles (0.80 km) of the town, to the southeast.

According to the 2010 census, Mecca has a total area of 0.39 square miles (1.01 km^{2}), all land.

== Demographics ==
Historical population
Census	Pop.	Note	%±
1980	482		—
1990	331		−31.3%
2000	355		7.3%
2010	335		−5.6%
2020	263		−21.5%
U.S. Decennial Census

=== 2010 census ===
As of the census of 2010, there were 335 people, 124 households, and 93 families living in the town. The population density was 859.0 inhabitants per square mile (331.7/km^{2}). There were 140 housing units at an average density of 359.0 per square mile (138.6/km^{2}). The racial makeup of the town was 97.6% White, 0.3% Asian, 0.9% from other races, and 1.2% from two or more races. Hispanic or Latino of any race were 0.9% of the population.

There were 124 households, of which 41.9% had children under the age of 18 living with them, 49.2% were married couples living together, 15.3% had a female householder with no husband present, 10.5% had a male householder with no wife present, and 25.0% were non-families. 20.2% of all households were made up of individuals, and 9.6% had someone living alone who was 65 years of age or older. The average household size was 2.70 and the average family size was 3.06.

The median age in the town was 35.5 years. 30.1% of residents were under the age of 18; 6.7% were between the ages of 18 and 24; 26.1% were from 25 to 44; 21.9% were from 45 to 64; and 15.5% were 65 years of age or older. The gender makeup of the town was 53.1% male and 46.9% female.

=== 2000 census ===
As of the census of 2000, there were 355 people, 136 households, and 96 families living in the town. The population density was 884.1 inhabitants per square mile (341.4/km^{2}). There were 156 housing units at an average density of 388.5 per square mile (150.0/km^{2}). The racial makeup of the town was 98.03% White, 0.28% Native American, and 1.69% from two or more races.

There were 136 households, out of which 36.8% had children under the age of 18 living with them, 46.3% were married couples living together, 16.9% had a female householder with no husband present, and 29.4% were non-families. 25.0% of all households were made up of individuals, and 8.8% had someone living alone who was 65 years of age or older. The average household size was 2.61 and the average family size was 3.08.

In the town, the population was spread out, with 30.7% under the age of 18, 6.5% from 18 to 24, 28.7% from 25 to 44, 26.8% from 45 to 64, and 7.3% who were 65 years of age or older. The median age was 33 years. For every 100 females, there were 92.9 males. For every 100 females age 18 and over, there were 90.7 males.

The median income for a household in the town was $31,375, and the median income for a family was $35,000. Males had a median income of $24,886 versus $20,938 for females. The per capita income for the town was $12,094. About 10.2% of families and 8.6% of the population were below the poverty line, including 7.4% of those under age 18 and 8.3% of those age 65 or over.

== Education ==
It is in the Southwest Parke Community School Corporation.
