= Mansfield Roller Mill =

- U.S. National Register of Historic Places
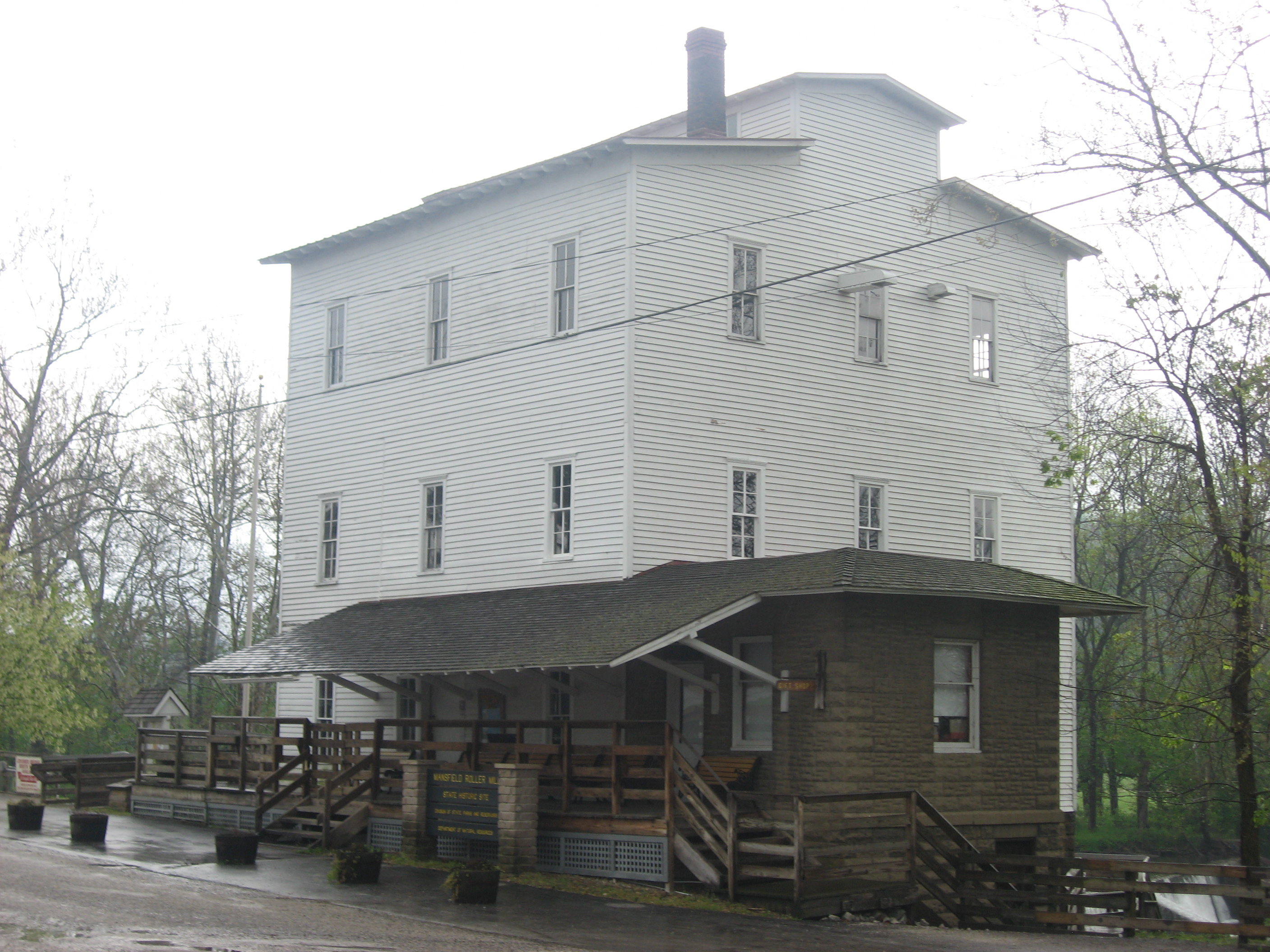

- Location within Parke County, Indiana Location within Indiana Location within the United States
- Location: Mansfield, Indiana
- Coordinates: 39°40′36.75″N 87°6′6.03″W
- Architect: Jacob Rohm
- MPS: Grain Mills in Indiana MPS
- NRHP reference No.: 90001788
- Added to NRHP: December 7, 1990

The Mansfield Roller Mill or Mansfield Mill is a gristmill that was built in Mansfield, Indiana, United States by Jacob Rohm in 1875. This building replaced an older mill that dates back to 1821 built by James Kelsey and Francis Dickson;

The mill is a state historic site owned by the Indiana Department of Natural Resources, Division of State Parks. It is operated by the Raccoon Lake Interpretive Services from nearby Raccoon State Recreation Area. Much of the original water powered equipment still operates.

== History ==
=== Original Mill ===
In 1821 James Kelsey and Francis Dickson partnered up to build a small mill along the banks of the Big Raccoon Creek. The spot they chose was ideal as it stood on firm sandstone bedrock near a sandstone ford in the creek. Plenty of virgin timber in the uncut wilderness provided materials for the original 30 X 20 log structure. In 1828, after a lengthy lawsuit, James Kelsey sells his half of the mill to Francis Dickson for $500. later that year Dickson sells 2/3 of an interest in the mill to James and Joseph Strain for $1,500. He then sells 1/3 of an interest in the mill for $1,800 to Joseph Pots. in 1831 Pots sells his interest in the mill to the Strain brothers in 1839 for $2,000. The Strain brothers are believed to be responsible for adding a sash mill sometime in the 1830s. In 1845 they sell the mill and surrounding land to Senator George Kirkpatrick Steele. Steele was a local store owner who had come to the area from nearby Portland Mills in 1829. During Steele's ownership it is believed that the original structure was added on and enlarged until it reached a size of 50' x 60'.

The mill was sold in 1846 to George W Crosby who died shortly thereafter. Leaving his heirs with significant debt the mill's ownership was sold at auction to Judge Samuel B Gookins for $4,714. Judge Gookins is responsible for platting the town of Mansfield during his ownership of the Mill. Peter and Nancy Bird bought the mills from Mr Gookin for $8,000 in 1861. The Mill changed hands 3 more times in the next 5 years, eventually coming into the hands of James Murphy in 1866 for $8,000. He then sold the mill to who perhaps may have been the most influential owners of the Mill, Jacob and Mary Rohm in 1875.

=== Jacob Rohm ===
In 1875 a local mill entrepreneur by the name of Jacob Rohm bought the Mansfield Mill. Being a veteran miller he made some impressive changes to the structure. first he tore down the mill in 1880 and redesigned it from the ground up. He replaced the previous tub wheels with two new water powered turbines, the 85 HP Rodney Hunt installed in 1886 and the 65 HP Lefel installed in 1889. He also modeled the mill entirely off of the latest Oliver Evans design with bucket elevators and spouts replacing bag and shoulder methods. He also added in a corn mill on the south wall in addition to the 4 operating flour mills. In 1884 he removed the antiquated Buhr stones and replaced them with top-of-the-line metal roll-stands. The new mill was valued at $18,000 in 1891.

=== End of Commercial Operations ===
In 1929, Jacob Rohm's two sons sold the mill to Walter Ferguson. He in turn sold the Mill to Clarence Reeves in 1933 for $2,000. R.L. Reeves inherited the mill from his father and ran the mill as R.L. Reeves and Son up until his death in 1967. The mill then sold in 1969 for $1.00 to Edward (Tex) Terry and his wife Isabell.

Between 1973 and 1978 Tex Kelly (Edward Earl Terry (actor)) "The Bad Man of the movies" purchased the Mansfield Roller Mill and several other buildings and attempted to fulfill his dream of turning the town into Frontier City. His efforts failed and in 1979, Tex and Isabel returned to Tex's hometown of Coxville, Indiana and opened "Tex's Longhorn Tavern".

in 1978 the mill was sold to Robert Twell.

Owners Jack & Shirley Dalton and Frank & Sharon Hutcheson donated the mill to the Indiana Department of Natural Resources, Division of State Museums and Historic Sites in 1995. In 2002 the mill was traded from The Division of Historic Sites to the Division of State Parks and Reservoirs, and is now owned, maintained and operated by Raccoon State Recreation Area.

In 1998 significant restoration work was started that took several years to complete. The overhaul was started by Indiana Division of Historic Sites in the 1990s and completed by Raccoon State Recreation Area in 2005. The mill does equipment demonstrations for festivals and special events using its original Rodney Hunt Turbine installed in 1886.

The Mansfield Roller Mill is located at the corner of Mansfield Rd. (historic) and Big Raccoon Creek in Mansfield IN 47872, just southeast of Rockville, Indiana.

Mansfield Road (historic) is now called by several names depending on the map date:

- Country Road-37 (CR-37) (Most maps)
- Green Castle Road
- East 700 South

== Geographic Coordinates ==
  - Latitude: 39° 40' 35" N Longitude: 87° 6' 7.99" W
  - Google Map

== See also ==
- List of Registered Historic Places in Indiana
- Mansfield Indiana
- Mansfield Covered Bridge
- Parke County Covered Bridges
- Pleasant Valley Cemetery
- Parke County Covered Bridge Festival
