= Mecca Covered Bridge =

Place in Indiana listed on National Register of Historic Places

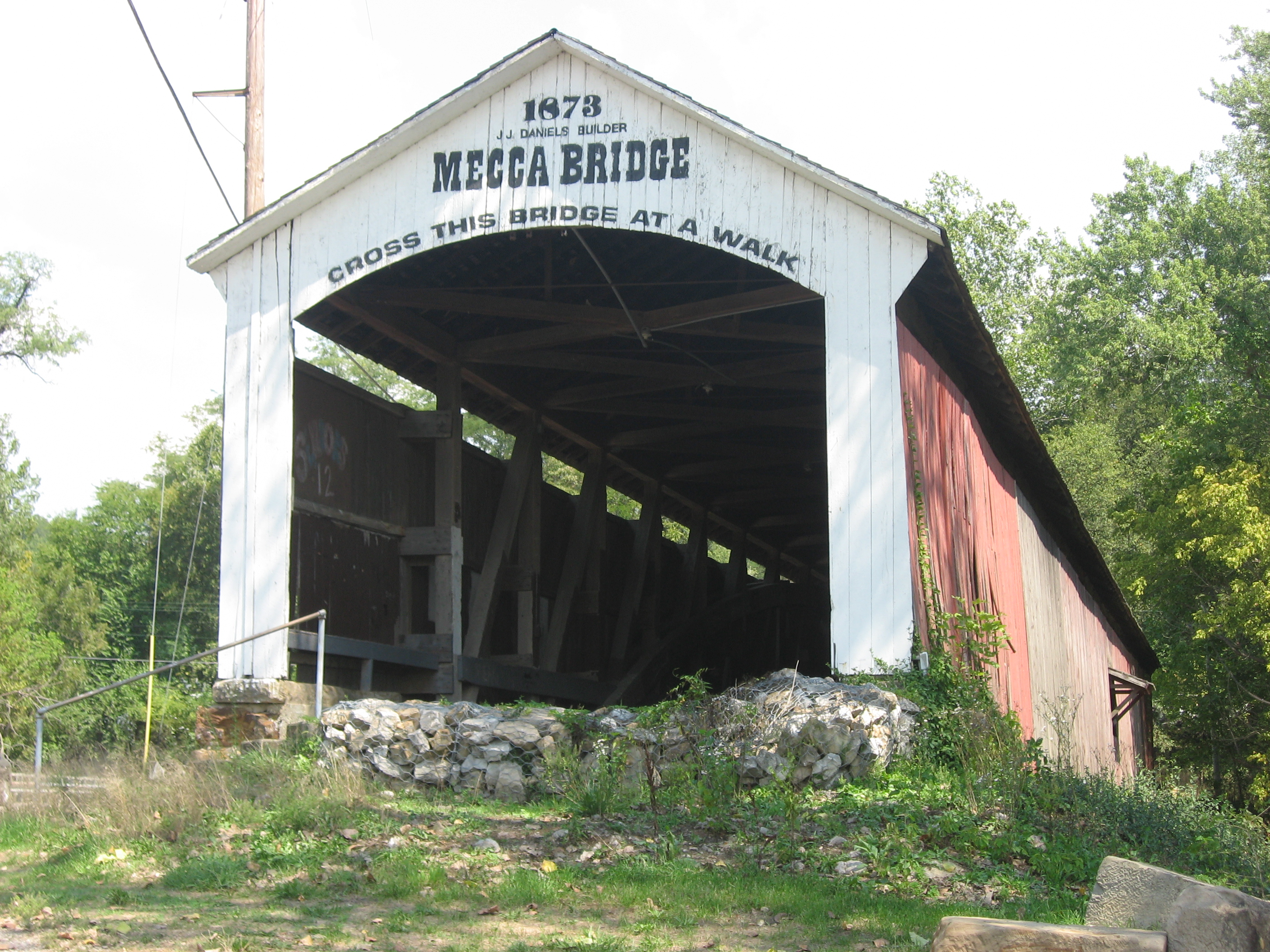
- Coordinates: 39°43′44.71″N 87°19′29.5″W
- Carries: Closed to vehicle traffic
- Crosses: Big Raccoon Creek, Indiana
- Locale: Mecca, Indiana, United States
- Official name: Mecca Covered Bridge
- Named for: Mecca, Indiana
- Maintained by: Parke County
- WGCB Number: 1. 14-61-13

Characteristics
- Design: National Register of Historic Places
- Total length: 176 ft (54 m)150ft +13ft overhangs on each end
- Width: 17 ft (5.2 m)
- Height: 12.5 ft (3.8 m)

History
- Constructed by: J. J. Daniels
- Built: 1873
- Construction cost: Original Cost $7,650
- Rebuilt: 1980
- Mecca Covered Bridge
- U.S. National Register of Historic Places
- MPS: Parke County Covered Bridges TR
- NRHP reference No.: 78000401
- Added to NRHP: Dec 22, 1978

Location
- Interactive map of Mecca Covered Bridge

The Mecca Covered Bridge crossing Big Raccoon Creek East of Mecca, Indiana is a single span Burr Arch Truss covered bridge structure that was built by J. J. Daniels in 1873. The bridge is 176 feet (54 m) long, 17 feet (5.2 m) wide, and 12.5 feet (3.8 m) high.

It was added to the National Register of Historic Places in 1978.

== Gallery ==
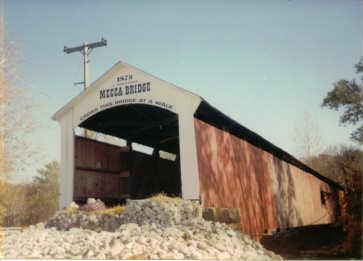

== See also ==
- List of Registered Historic Places in Indiana
- Parke County Covered Bridges
- Parke County Covered Bridge Festival
