= Wabash Township Graded School =

- U.S. National Register of Historic Places
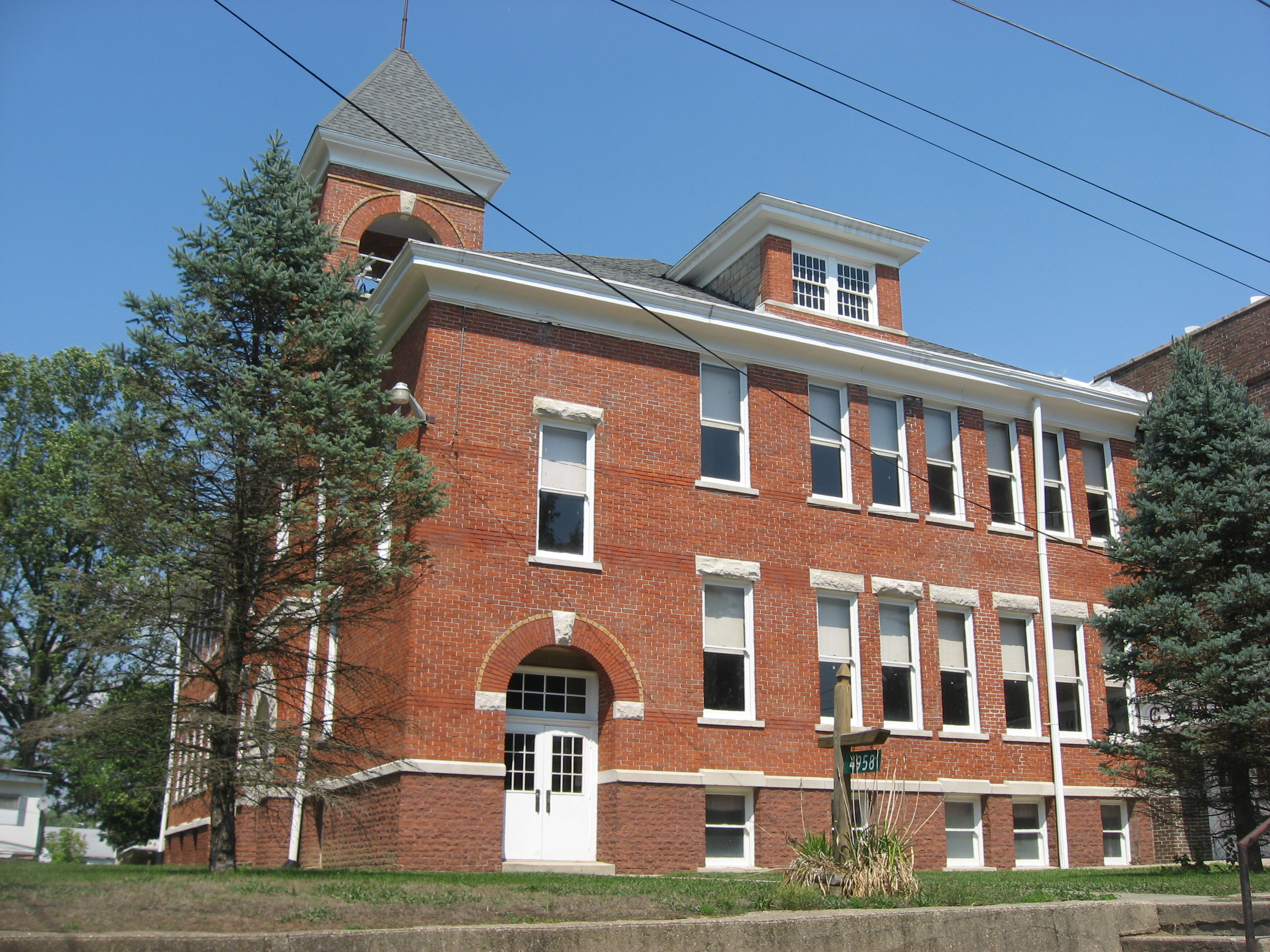
- Wabash Township Graded School, August 2012

- Location within Parke County, Indiana Location within Indiana Location within the United States
- Location: S. Montezuma St., Mecca, Indiana
- Coordinates: 39°43′30″N 87°19′55″W
- Area: 1 acre (0.40 ha)
- Built: 1901, 1910, 1923
- Architect: Allen, Layton; Boswell, J.T.
- Architectural style: Romanesque, Richardsonian Romanesque
- NRHP reference No.: 87000950
- Added to NRHP: June 22, 1987

Wabash Township Graded School, also known as Mecca High School and Mecca Grade School, is a historic school building located at Mecca, Indiana. The main section was built in 1901 and expanded in 1910, and is a two-story, Richardsonian Romanesque style red brick building on a raise basement. It has a hipped roof and limestone trim. The main building features a bell tower over the main entrance. A gymnasium was added in 1923. The school closed in 1986.

It was added to the National Register of Historic Places in 1987.

A fire on November 9, 2022, caused serious damage to the building.

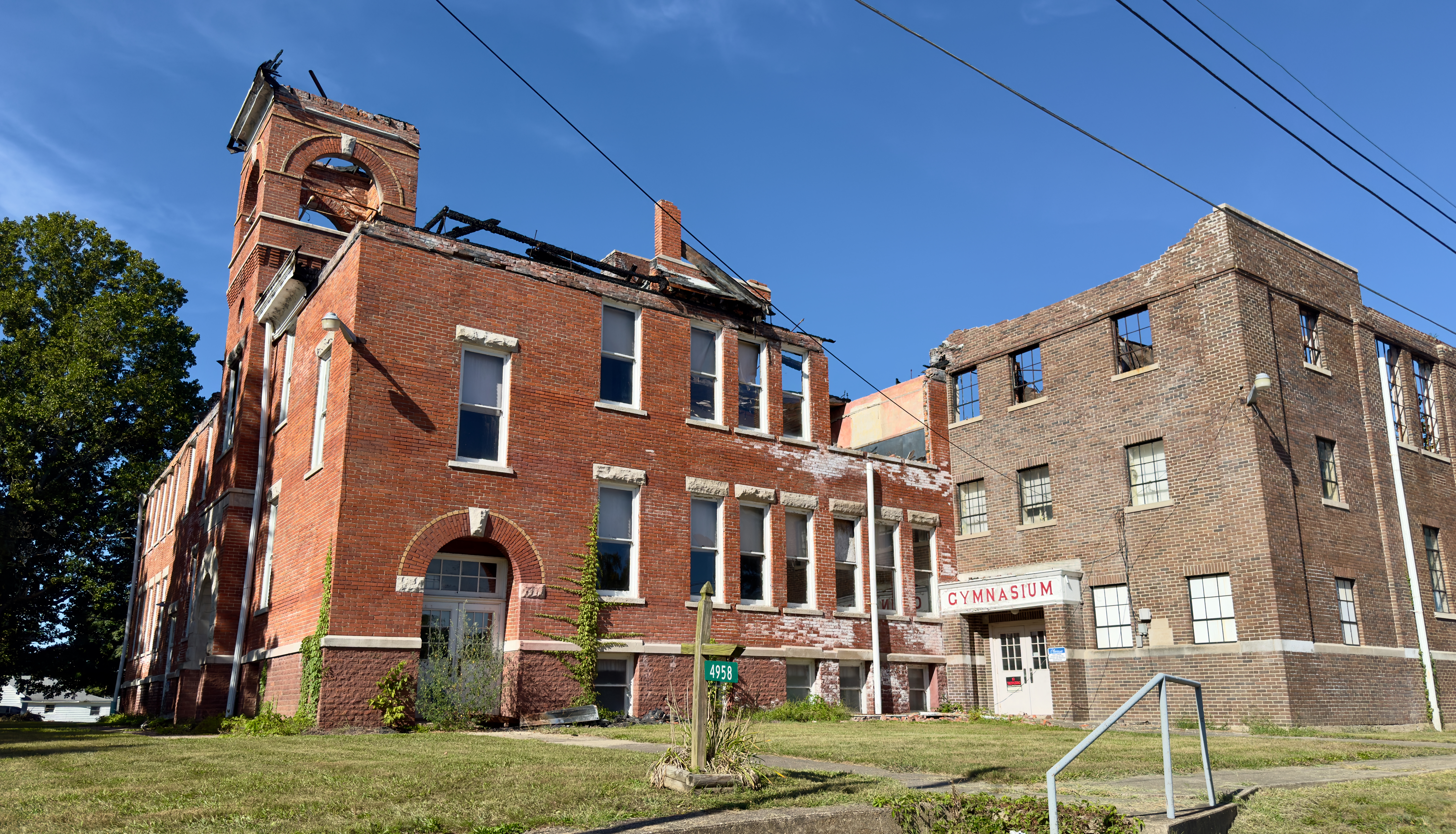
The historic Wabash Township Graded School building in Mecca, Indiana, three years after a fire.
