= Richard Lieber Log Cabin =

Historic house in Indiana, United States

- U.S. National Register of Historic Places
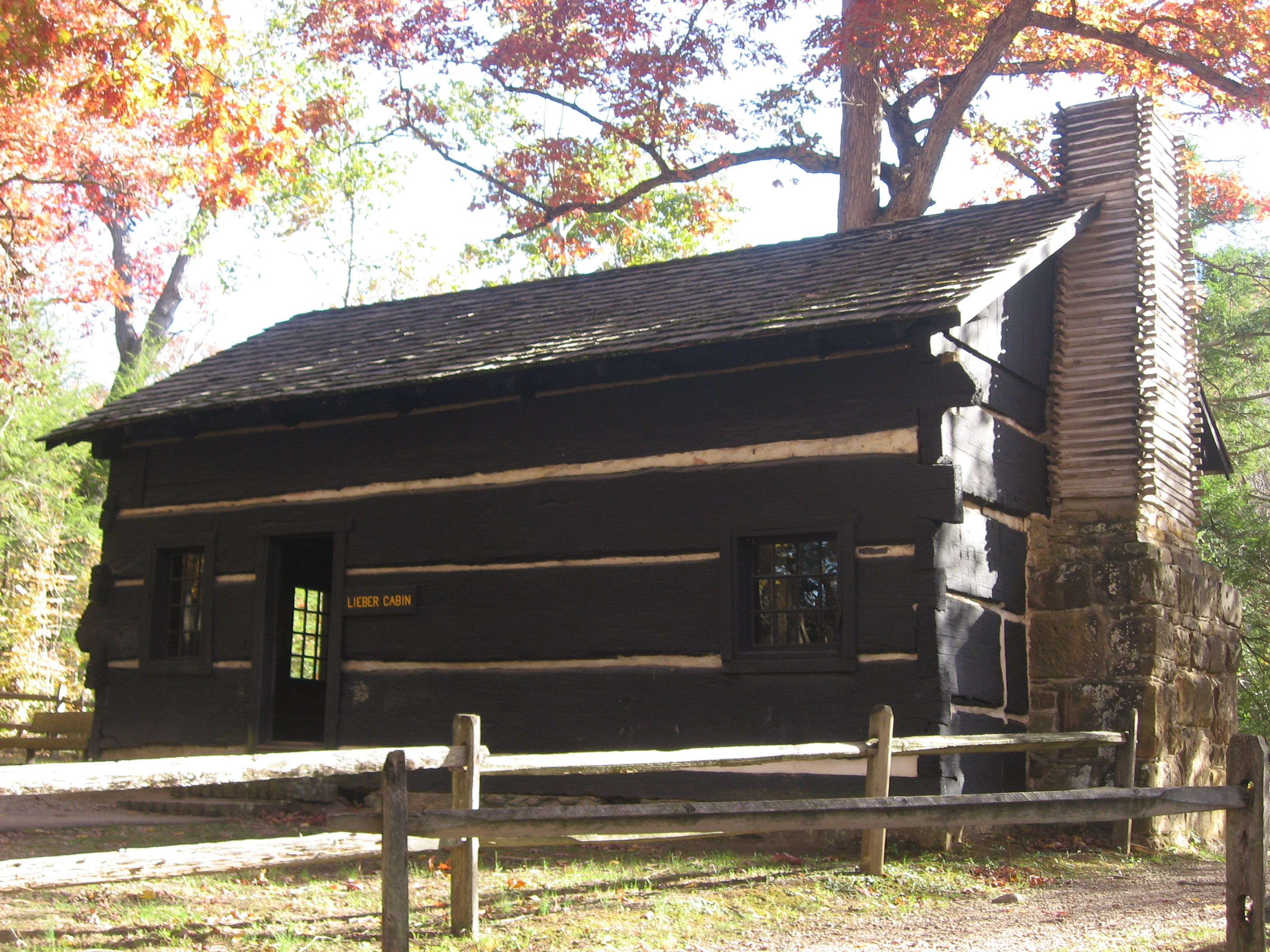
- Richard Lieber Log Cabin, October 2012

- Location within Parke County, Indiana Location within Indiana Location within the United States
- Location: Turkey Run State Park, north of Marshall in Sugar Creek Township, Parke County, Indiana
- Coordinates: 39°53′4″N 87°12′24″W
- Area: less than one acre
- Built: 1848
- Built by: Gay, Daniel; Lieber, Richard
- Architectural style: Split-log cabin
- NRHP reference No.: 01000403
- Added to NRHP: May 4, 2001

Richard Lieber Log Cabin, also known as the Old Log Cabin, is a historic log cabin located at Turkey Run State Park in Sugar Creek Township, Parke County, Indiana. It was built in 1848, and completely rebuilt in 1918. It is a one-story, hewn poplar log structure with a side-gable roof. It has a frame ell. The original log structure measures 30 feet wide and 20 feet deep and features a cat and clay chimney.

It was added to the National Register of Historic Places in 2001.
