= Rockville Historic District (Rockville, Indiana) =

Historic district in Indiana, United States

- U.S. National Register of Historic Places
- U.S. Historic district
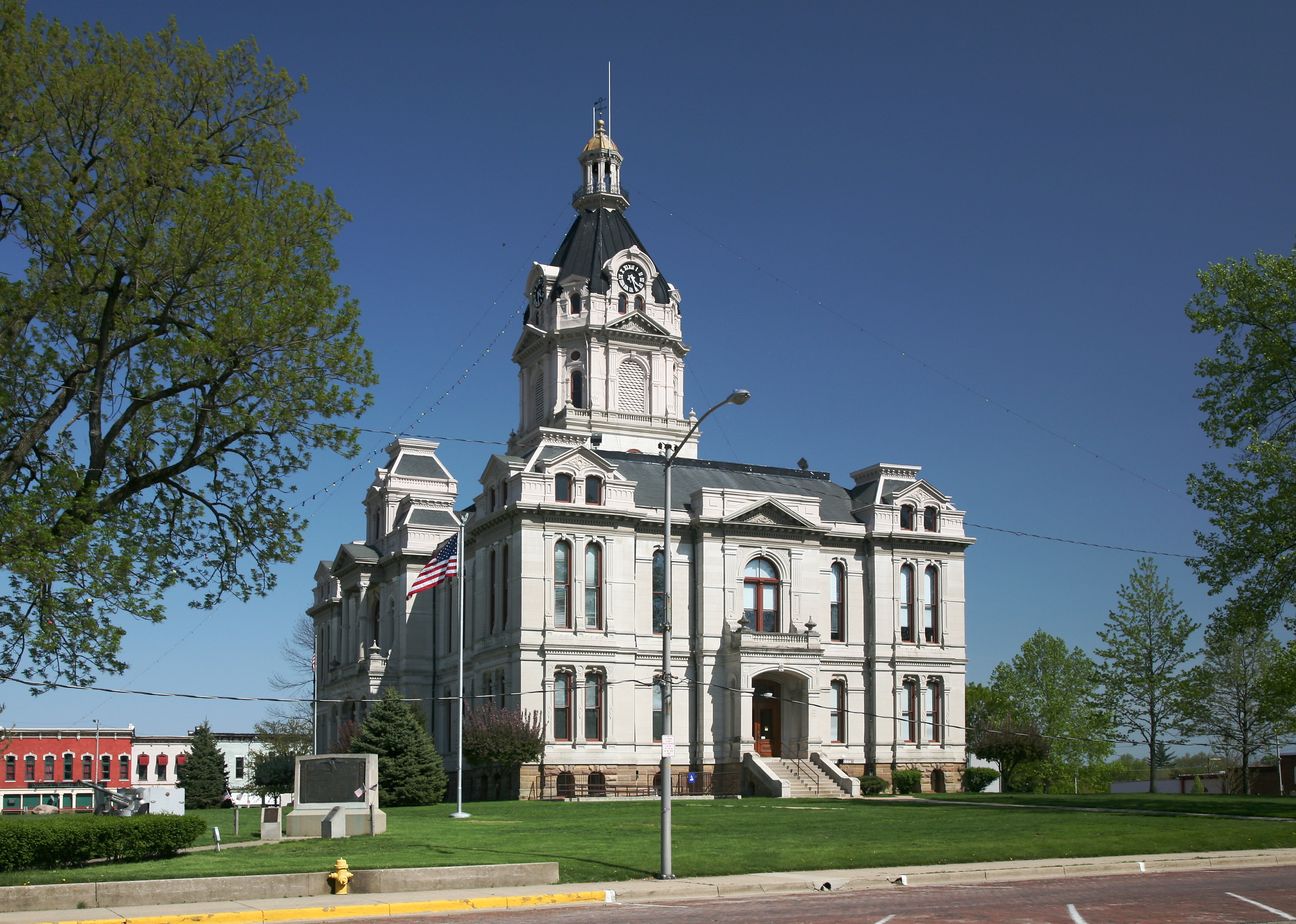
- Parke County Courthouse, May 2008

- Location within Indiana Location within the United States
- Location: Roughly bounded by Howard Ave. and Jefferson, High and College Sts., Rockville, Indiana
- Coordinates: 39°45′47″N 87°13′51″W
- Area: 70 acres (28 ha)
- Architect: Beeson, Carroll O. et al.; Tolan, T.J. & Son
- Architectural style: Colonial Revival, Italianate, Queen Anne
- NRHP reference No.: 93000471
- Added to NRHP: May 27, 1993

Rockville Historic District is a national historic district located at Rockville, Indiana. The district encompasses 210 contributing buildings, three contributing structures, and one contributing object in the central business district and surrounding residential sections of Rockville. It developed between about 1826 and 1942, and includes notable examples of Italianate, Colonial Revival, and Queen Anne style architecture. Notable contributing resources include the Parke County Courthouse (1882), Memorial Presbyterian Church (1891), Sheriff' Residence and Jail, U.S. Post Office (1938), Rockville Public Library (1916), Methodist Episcopal Church (1862, 1892, 1909), Rockville Grade School (1941), Parke County Seminary (1839), Rockville Opera House (1912), First National Bank (1907), Judge Samuel Maxwell House (c. 1830), Dr. P.Q. Stryker House (1838), Dr. Harrison J. Rice House (1880), and Dr. Marion Goss House (1907).

It was listed on the National Register of Historic Places in 1993.
