= Cox Ford Covered Bridge =

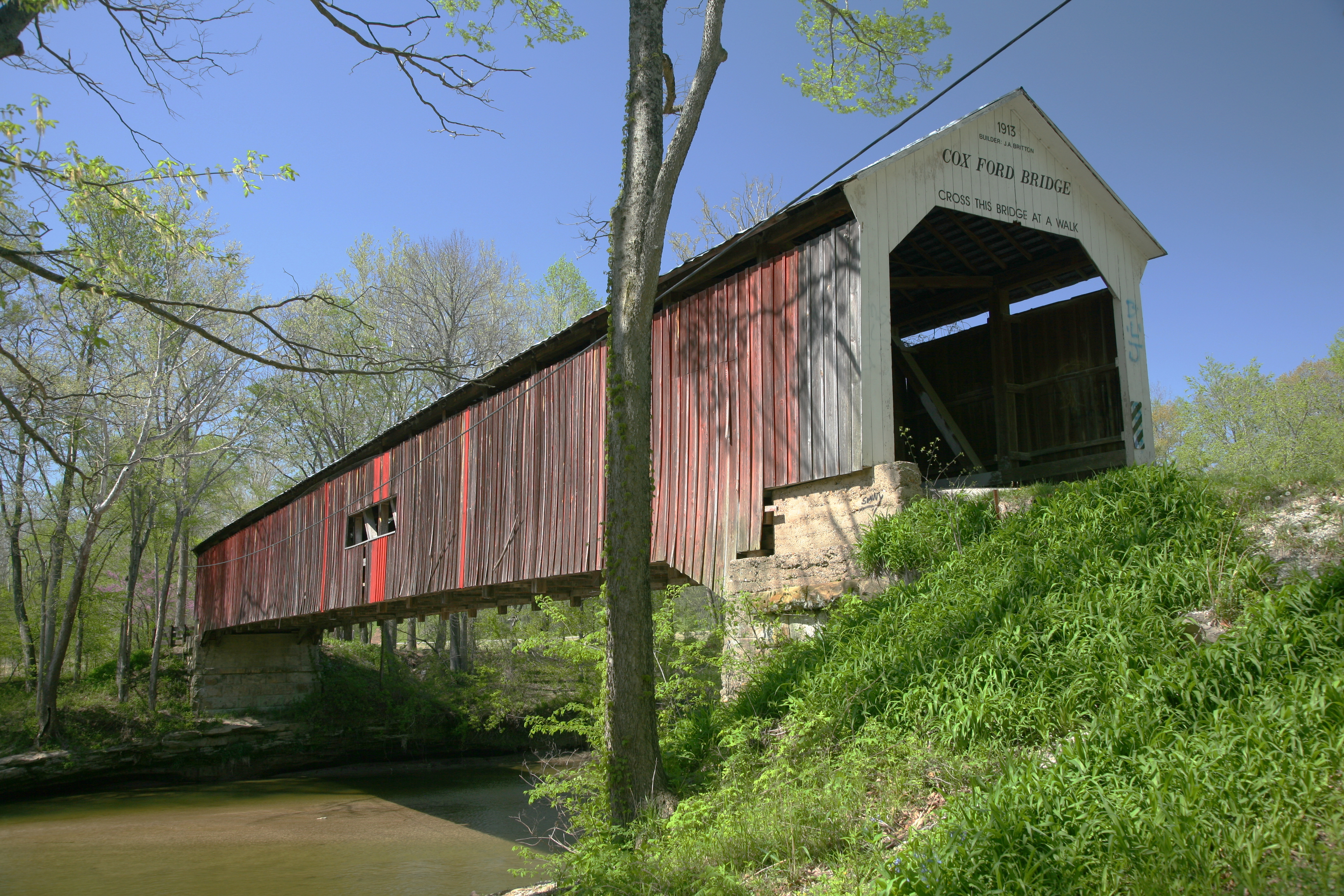
- Cox Ford Bridge
- Coordinates: 39°53′7.6″N 87°13′25.64″W
- Carries: Cox Ford Road
- Crosses: Sugar Creek
- Locale: Parke County, Indiana, United States
- Official name: Cox Ford Covered Bridge
- Named for: Cox Ford
- Maintained by: Parke County Commissioners; Parke County
- WGCB #: 14-61-34

Characteristics
- Design: Burr arch truss bridge
- Material: Concrete on top of stone block (foundations)
- Trough construction: Wood
- Total length: 176 ft (53.6 m) (includes 8 ft (2.4 m) overhangs on each end)
- Width: 16 ft (4.9 m)
- Longest span: 160 ft (48.8 m)
- No. of spans: 1
- Clearance above: 13 ft (4.0 m)
- Cox Ford Covered Bridge (#7)
- U.S. National Register of Historic Places
- U.S. Historic district – Contributing property
- Location within Parke County, Indiana Location within Indiana Location within the United States
- Built: 1913
- Built by: Joseph A. Britton
- Website: Conley's Ford Bridge
- Part of: Parke County Covered Bridges TR (ID64000193)
- NRHP reference No.: 78000390
- Added to NRHP: December 22, 1978

Location
- Interactive map of Cox Ford Covered Bridge

The Cox Ford Covered Bridge is a covered bridge that crosses Sugar Creek along the western edge of Turkey Run State Park in Parke County, Indiana.

== History ==
This single span Burr Arch truss structure has a length of 160 ft (49 m), or 176 ft (54 m) including the 8 ft (2.4 m) overhang at each end, with a portal clearance 16 ft (4.9 m) wide by 13 ft (4.0 m) in height. Built in 1913 by Joseph A. Britton, the Cox Ford Covered Bridge has a rather unusual distinction as it was built to replace a steel bridge lost in the 1913 flood; the arches used to construction this structure were from the Armiesburg Covered Bridge, built 60 years earlier and also washed out during the 1913 flood.

During the Great Depression, the Cox Ford Covered Bridge received a new coat of paint that was applied by a Works Progress Administration group, and though no historical marker is present, the bridge was listed on the National Register of Historic Places in 1978. It is listed in the 1989 World Guide to Covered Bridges, published by The National Society for the Preservation of Covered Bridges, Inc., as #14-61-34; however, the designation used by Parke County officials is #14-61-36. In the February 1938 Indiana History Bulletin, Robert B. Yule and Richard C. Smith assigned the designation 'sg' to this Covered Timber Bridge located in Section 28, Township 17 North, and Range 7 West, about 1/2 a mile west of Turkey Run State Park.

== Gallery ==
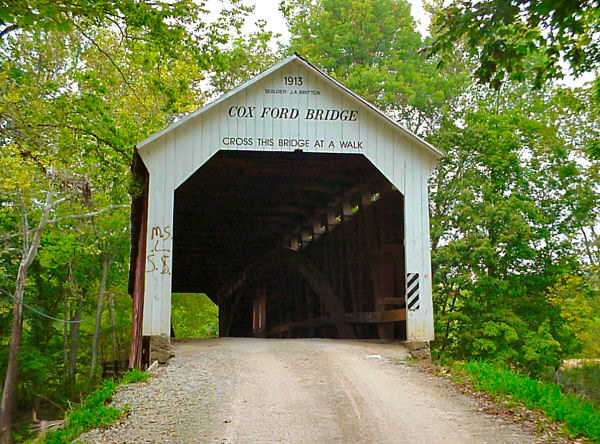
Portal detail

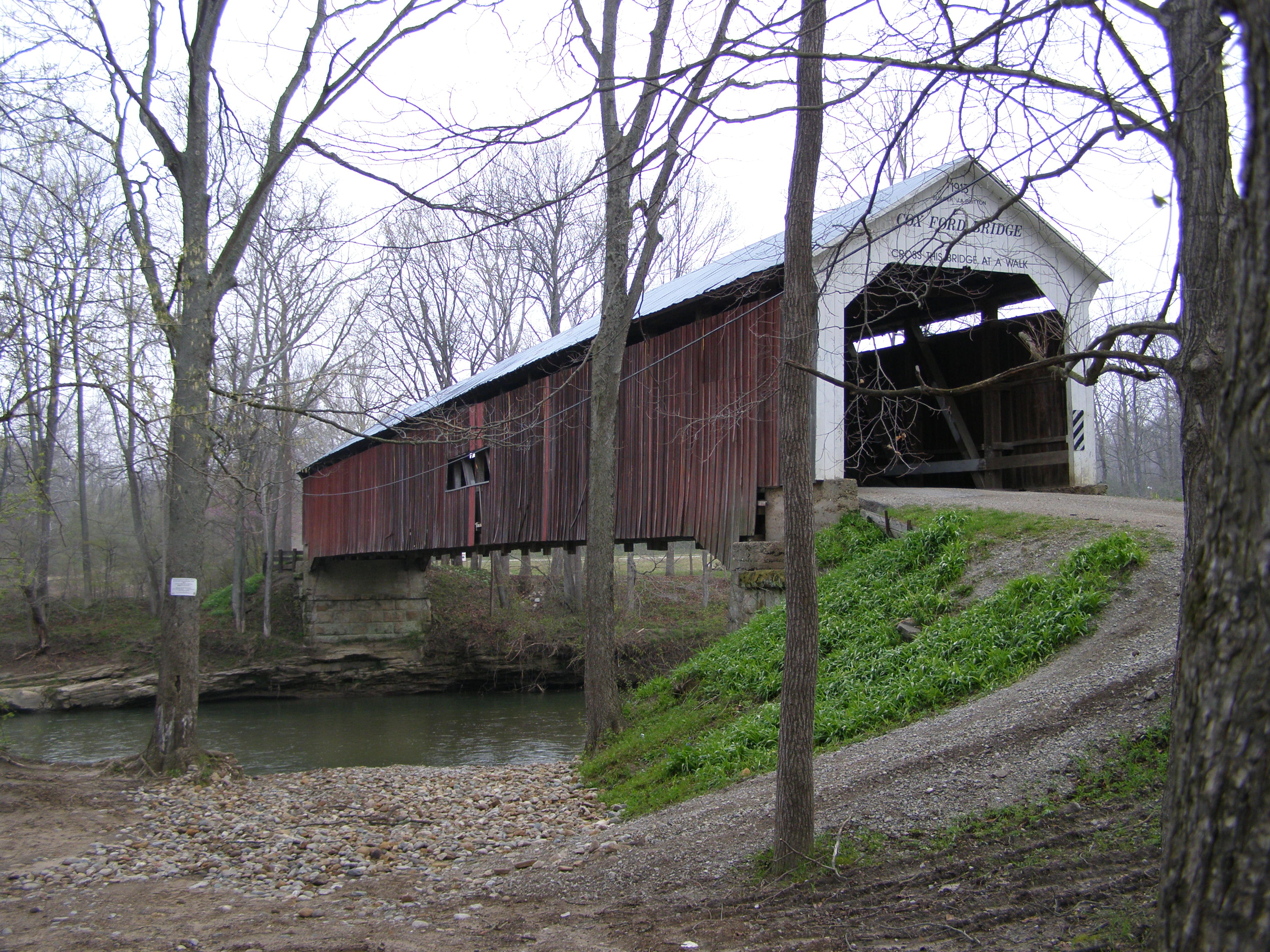

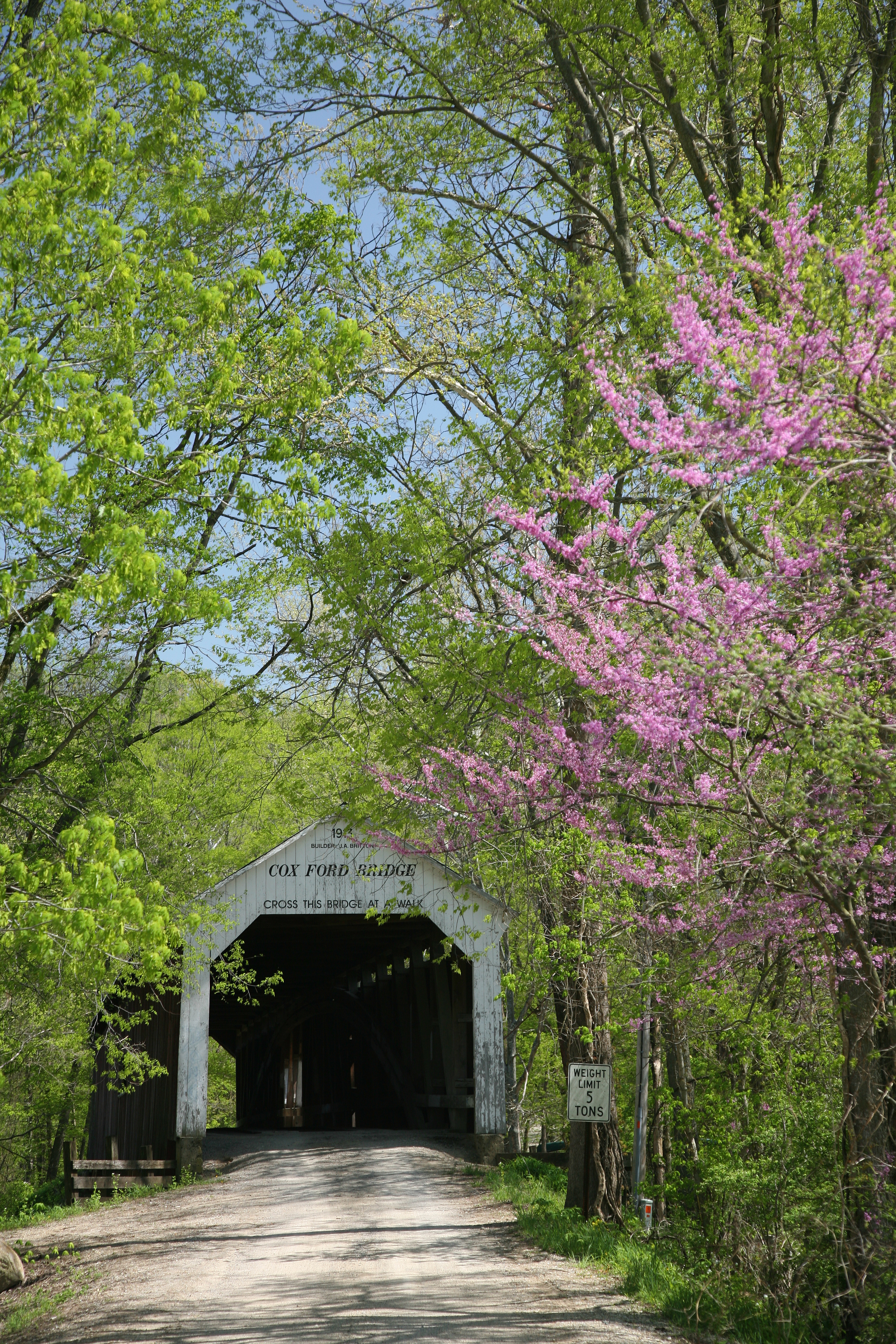

== See also ==
- List of Registered Historic Places in Indiana
- Parke County Covered Bridges
- Parke County Covered Bridge Festival
