= Lancelot C. Ewbank House =

Historic house in Indiana, United States

- U.S. National Register of Historic Places
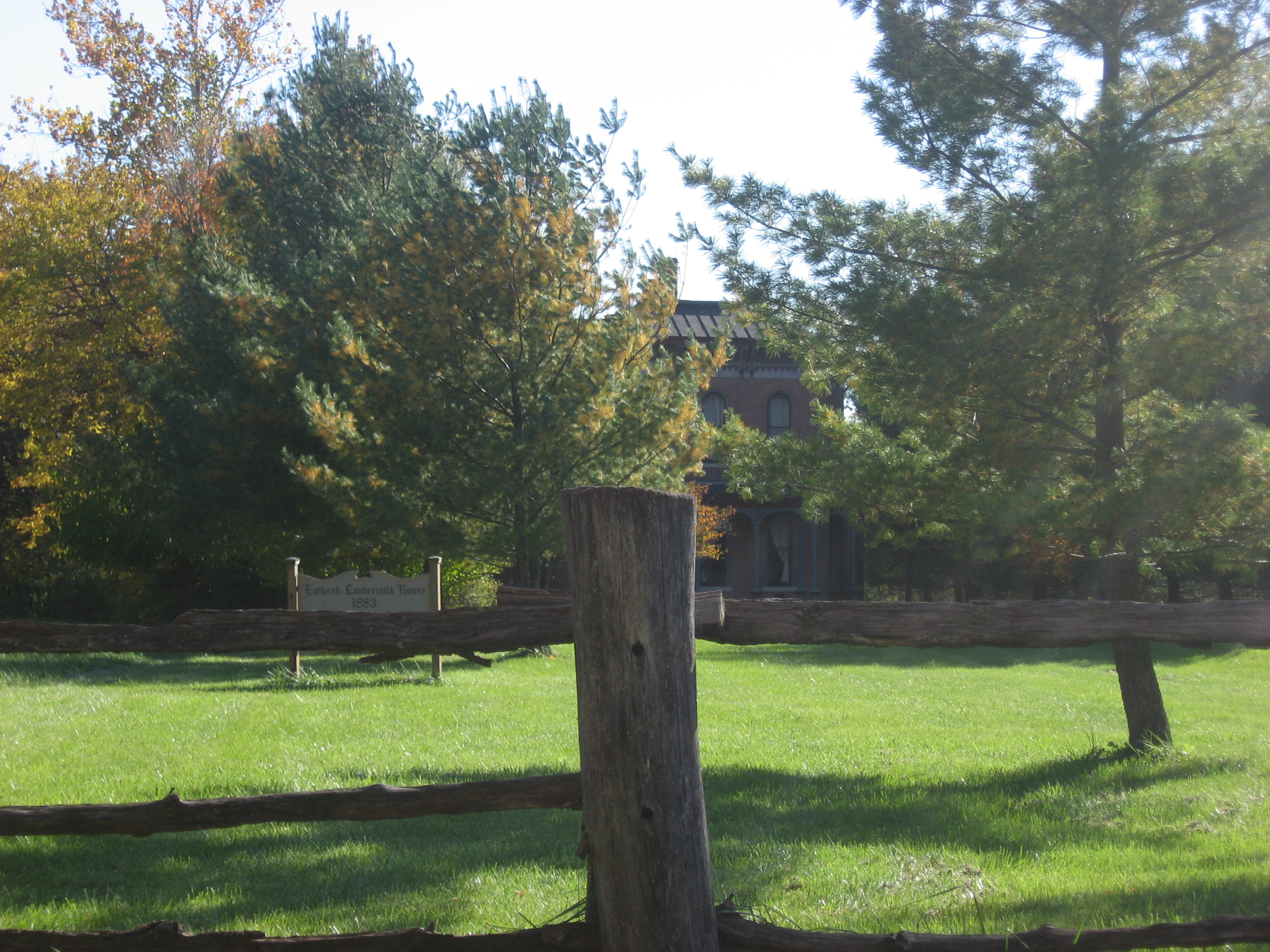
- Lancelot C. Ewbank House, October 2012

- Location within Parke County, Indiana Location within Indiana Location within the United States
- Location: County Road 102E between 1200N and 300E, east of Tangier in Penn Township, Parke County, Indiana
- Coordinates: 39°55′23″N 87°12′57″W
- Area: less than one acre
- Built: 1883
- Architectural style: Stick/eastlake, Italianate
- NRHP reference No.: 88001578
- Added to NRHP: September 26, 1988

Lancelot C. Ewbank House, also known as the Ewbank-Loudermilk House, is a historic home located in Penn Township, Parke County, Indiana. It was built in 1883, and is a two-story, "T"-plan, high-style Italianate style brick dwelling with a truncated hipped roof. It features round-arched windows, decorative scroll brackets, and a wooden porch with intricate decorative elements. Also on the property is a contributing summer kitchen.

It was added to the National Register of Historic Places in 1988.
