= Mansfield, Indiana =

Unincorporated community in Indiana, United States

- Unincorporated community
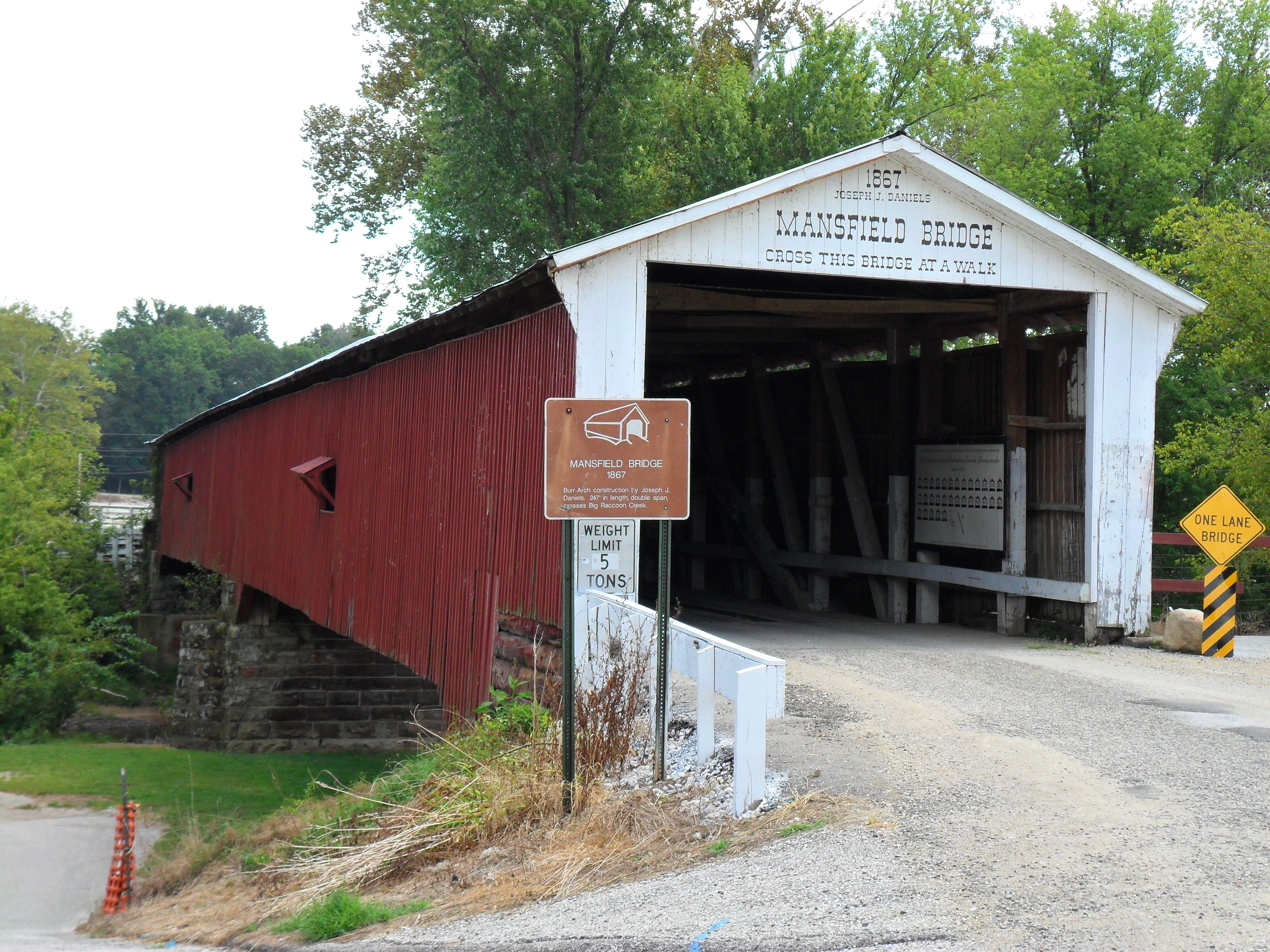
- Mansfield Covered Bridge

- Parke County's location in Indiana

- Location in Parke County
- Coordinates: 39°40′35″N 87°06′08″W
- Country: United States
- State: Indiana
- County: Parke
- Township: Jackson
- Elevation: 590 ft (180 m)
- Time zone: UTC-5 (Eastern (EST))
  - Summer (DST): UTC-4 (EDT)
- ZIP code: 47837
- Area code: 765
- GNIS feature ID: 438533

Mansfield (also called Mansfield Village, Dicksons Mills, Dixons Mills, Dublin or New Dublin) is an unincorporated community in Jackson Township, Parke County, in the U.S. state of Indiana.

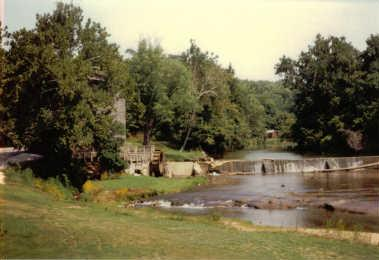
The Mansfield Mill

== History ==
The village was originally named New Dublin by James Kelsey in 1820. Within a couple of years, it was called Dickson's Mills, and then Strain's Mills, before it became known as Mansfield in the 1830s.

The village prospered when a roller mill was built by James Kelsey and Francis Dickson in 1820. As the milling industry expanded, the village grew to a thriving town of more than 300. A sash mill and carding mill were added, and the little town gained a general store, blacksmith, cooperage and wagon maker, and a church and school were organized.

== See also ==
- List of Registered Historic Places in Indiana
- Mansfield Roller Mill
- Big Rocky Fork Covered Bridge
- Mansfield Covered Bridge
- Parke County Covered Bridges
- Pleasant Valley Cemetery
- Parke County Covered Bridge Festival
