= Narrows Covered Bridge =

Place in Indiana listed on National Register of Historic Places

The Narrows Covered Bridge
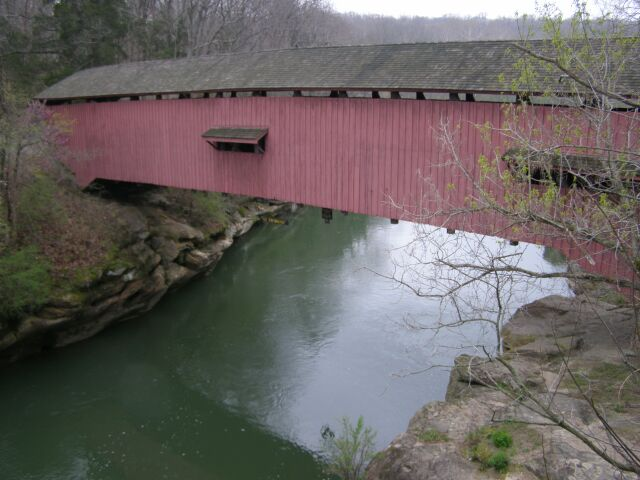
- The Narrows of Sugar Creek (Turkey Run State Park)
- Coordinates: 39°53′27.68″N 87°11′8.46″W
- Carries: Narrows Road
- Crosses: Sugar Creek, Parke County, Indiana
- Locale: Turkey Run State Park, Parke County, Indiana, United States
- Official name: The Narrows Covered Bridge
- Named for: nearby "Narrows" on Sugar Creek.
- Maintained by: State of Indiana Department of Natural Resources
- WGCB Number: 1. 14-61-36

Characteristics
- Design: National Register of Historic Places
- Total length: 137 ft (42 m)121ft +8ft overhangs on each end
- Width: 16.5 ft (5.0 m)
- Height: 12.5 ft (3.8 m)

History
- Constructed by: J. A. Britton
- Built: 1882
- Construction cost: Original Cost $3,400
- Rebuilt: 1977
- Narrows Covered Bridge
- U.S. National Register of Historic Places
- MPS: Parke County Covered Bridges TR
- NRHP reference No.: 78000404
- Added to NRHP: Dec 22, 1978

Location
- Interactive map of The Narrows Covered Bridge

The Narrows Covered Bridge crosses Sugar Creek at the eastern edge of Turkey Run State Park in Parke County, Indiana and is a single span Burr Arch Truss covered bridge structure that was built by Joseph A. Britton in 1882.

It was added to the National Register of Historic Places in 1978.

== History ==
The Narrows Covered Bridge was built to replace the previous bridge that Salmon Lusk had built in 1847, which itself had been built to replace the bridge he'd built in 1840. The first bridge was destroyed in 1847 and the second in 1875.

The Parke County Commissioners didn't decide to replace the bridge for several years and by then iron bridges were becoming popular. Finally, on August 24, 1882, the first bids opened. These included: Smith Iron Works (iron, $6,680), Wrought Iron Bridge Co. (iron, $5,706), King Iron Bridge Co. (iron, $2,904), Columbia Bridge Works (iron, $3,288), G. F. Haynes (wood, $2,704), and J. A. Britton (wood, $3,750 total). Except for Mr. Britton's bid, the others may or may not include the cost for the abutments or other costs. At any rate, all of the bids were rejected.

J. A. Britton was later awarded the contract for $3,400. This bridge has been acclaimed as the first in J. A. Britton's illustrious covered bridge career. Some purists though have criticized the pointed arch joints and it can be noted that J. A. Britton built a Billie Creek Bridge in 1880, but it was probably an open bridge.

Joseph A. Britton's first wife died while he was working on the Narrows Bridge. He later met his second wife, who was living at a farm not far from the narrows, while working on the bridge.

== Gallery ==
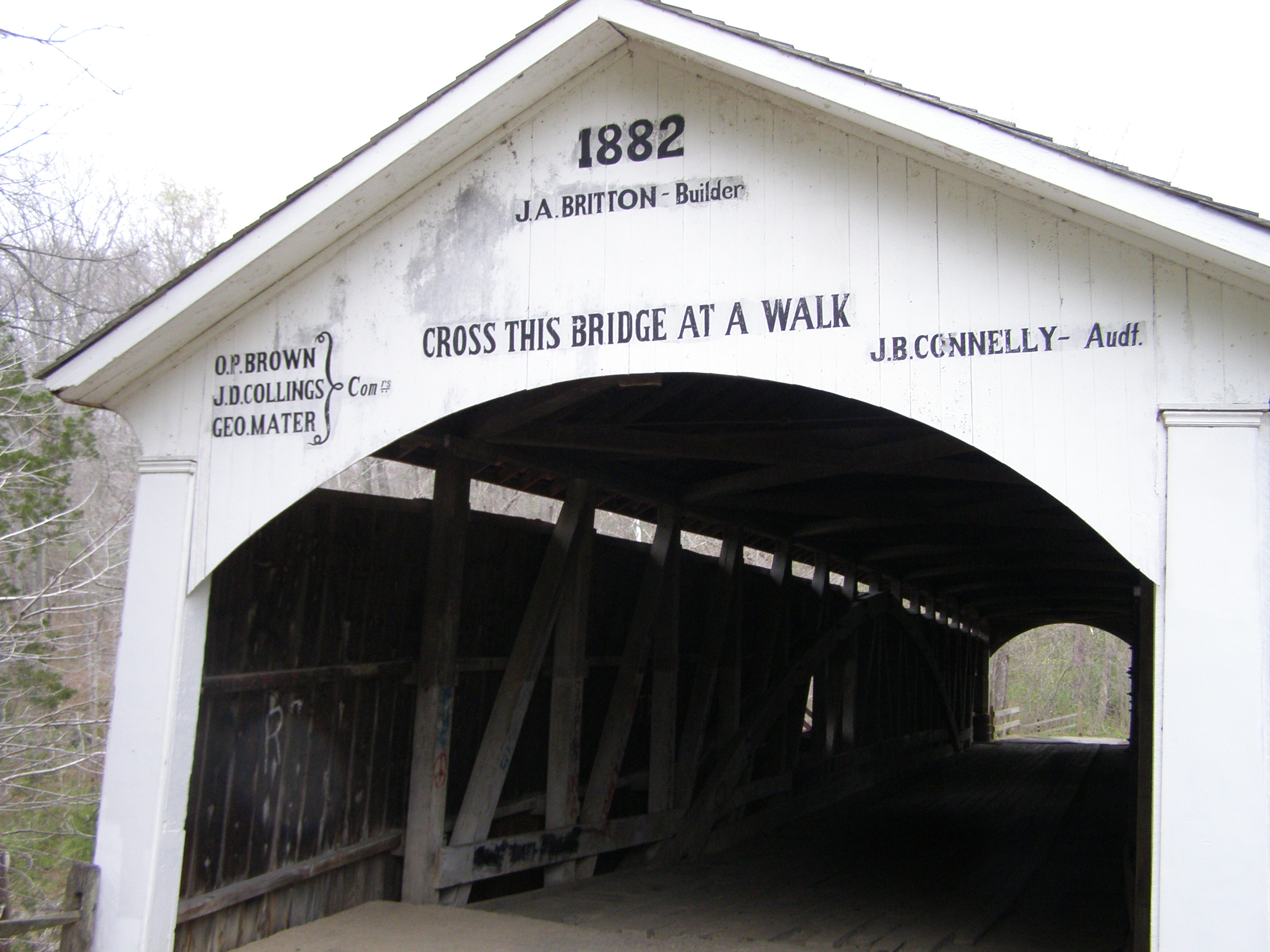
South portal includes information about the bridge

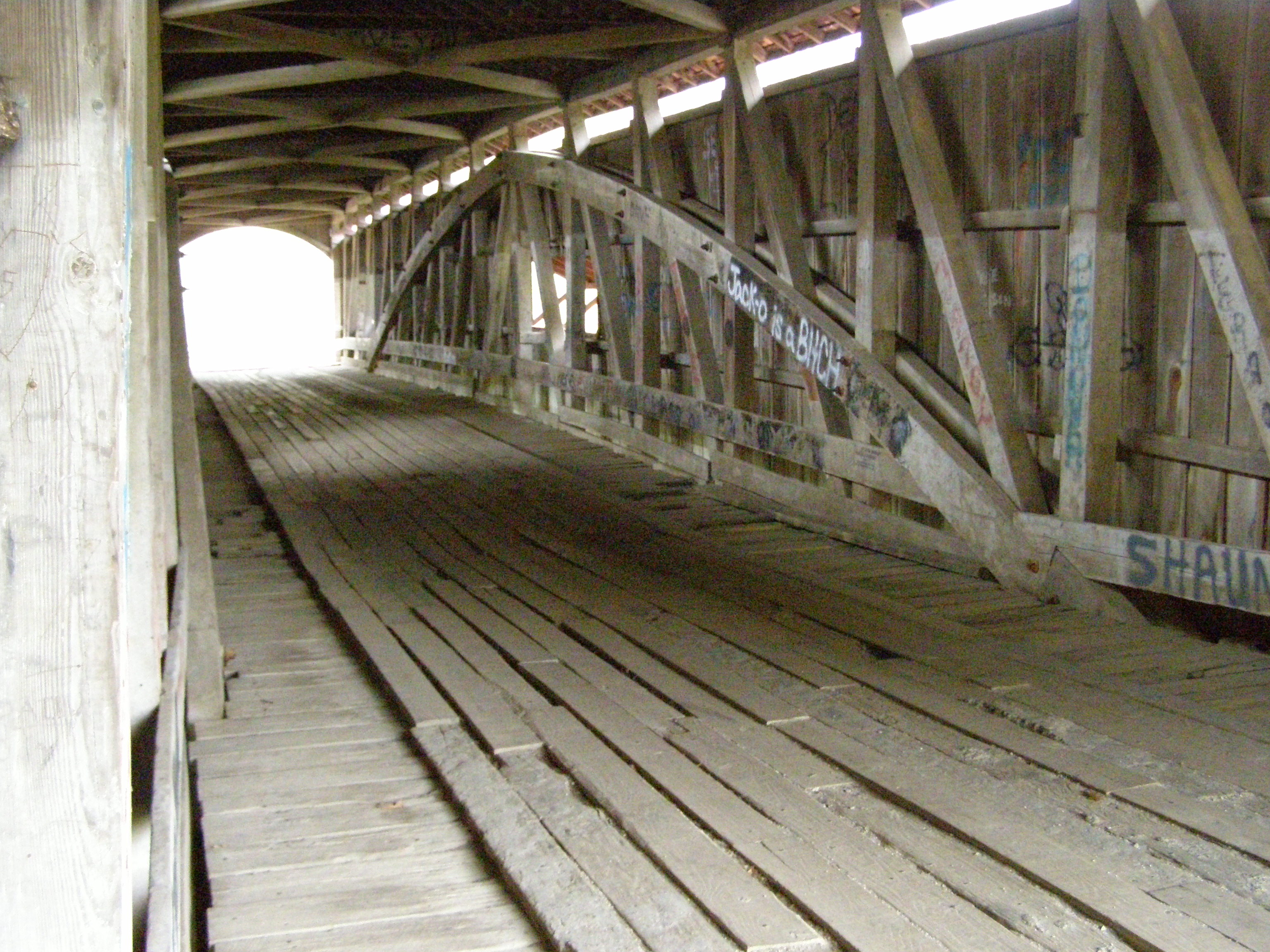
Here the arch is clearly visible

== See also ==
- List of bridges documented by the Historic American Engineering Record in Indiana
- List of Registered Historic Places in Indiana
- Parke County Covered Bridges
- Parke County Covered Bridge Festival
