= Bowsher Ford Covered Bridge =

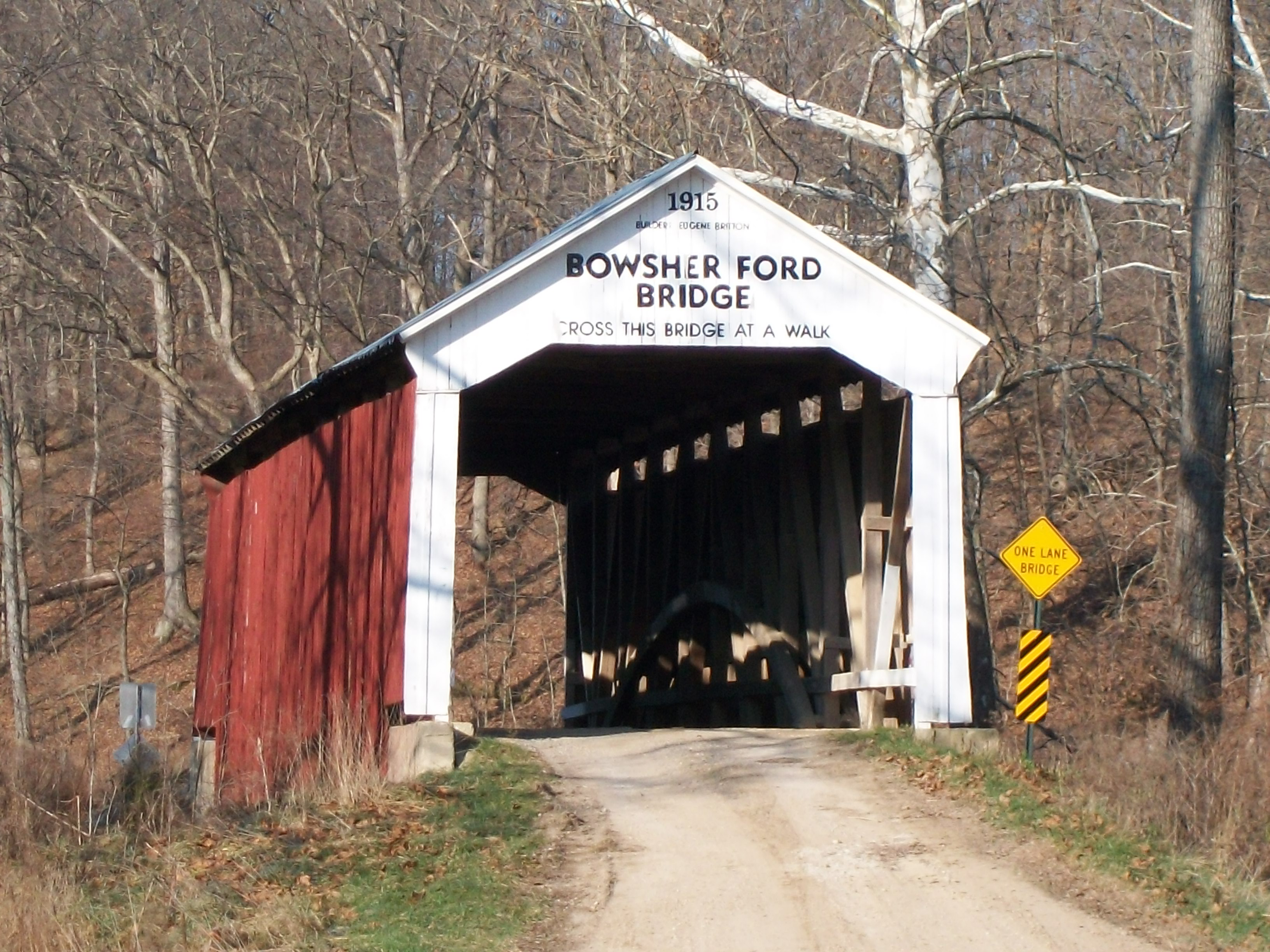
- East portal Bowsher Ford Covered Bridge
- Coordinates: 39°55′47.17″N 87°21′6.38″W
- Carries: Bowsher Road
- Crosses: Mill Creek
- Locale: 2 miles (3.2 km) northwest of Tangier in Liberty Township, Parke County, Indiana
- Official name: Bowsher Ford Bridge
- Named for: Bowsher Ford
- Maintained by: Parke County
- WGCB #: 14-61-33

Characteristics
- Design: Burr arch truss bridge
- Material: Concrete (foundations)
- Trough construction: Wood
- Total length: 92 ft (28.0 m) (includes 10 ft (3.0 m) overhangs on each end)
- Width: 16 ft (4.9 m)
- Longest span: 72 ft (21.9 m)
- No. of spans: 1
- Clearance above: 13.5 ft (4.1 m)
- Bowsher Ford Covered Bridge (#39)
- U.S. National Register of Historic Places
- U.S. Historic district – Contributing property
- Location within Parke County, Indiana Location within Indiana Location within the United States
- Built: 1915
- Built by: Eugene Britton
- Website: Bowsher Ford Covered Bridge (#32)
- Part of: Parke County Covered Bridges TR (ID64000193)
- NRHP reference No.: 78000385
- Added to NRHP: December 22, 1978

Location
- Interactive map of Bowsher Ford Covered Bridge

The Bowsher Ford Covered Bridge is a single span Burr Arch truss covered bridge structure in Liberty Township, Parke County, Indiana that was built by J.A. Britton's son, Eugene Britton, in 1915.

== History ==
Elmer Garrard won the bid to build this bridge but needed the Britton families expertise. Eugene Britton was contracted and credited as the builder.

It was added to the National Register of Historic Places in 1978.

== Gallery ==
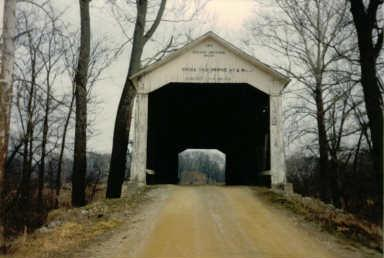
Bowsher Ford Bridge in the mid-1990s.

== See also ==
- List of Registered Historic Places in Indiana
- Parke County Covered Bridges
- Parke County Covered Bridge Festival
