= Rockville Chautauqua Pavilion =

- U.S. National Register of Historic Places
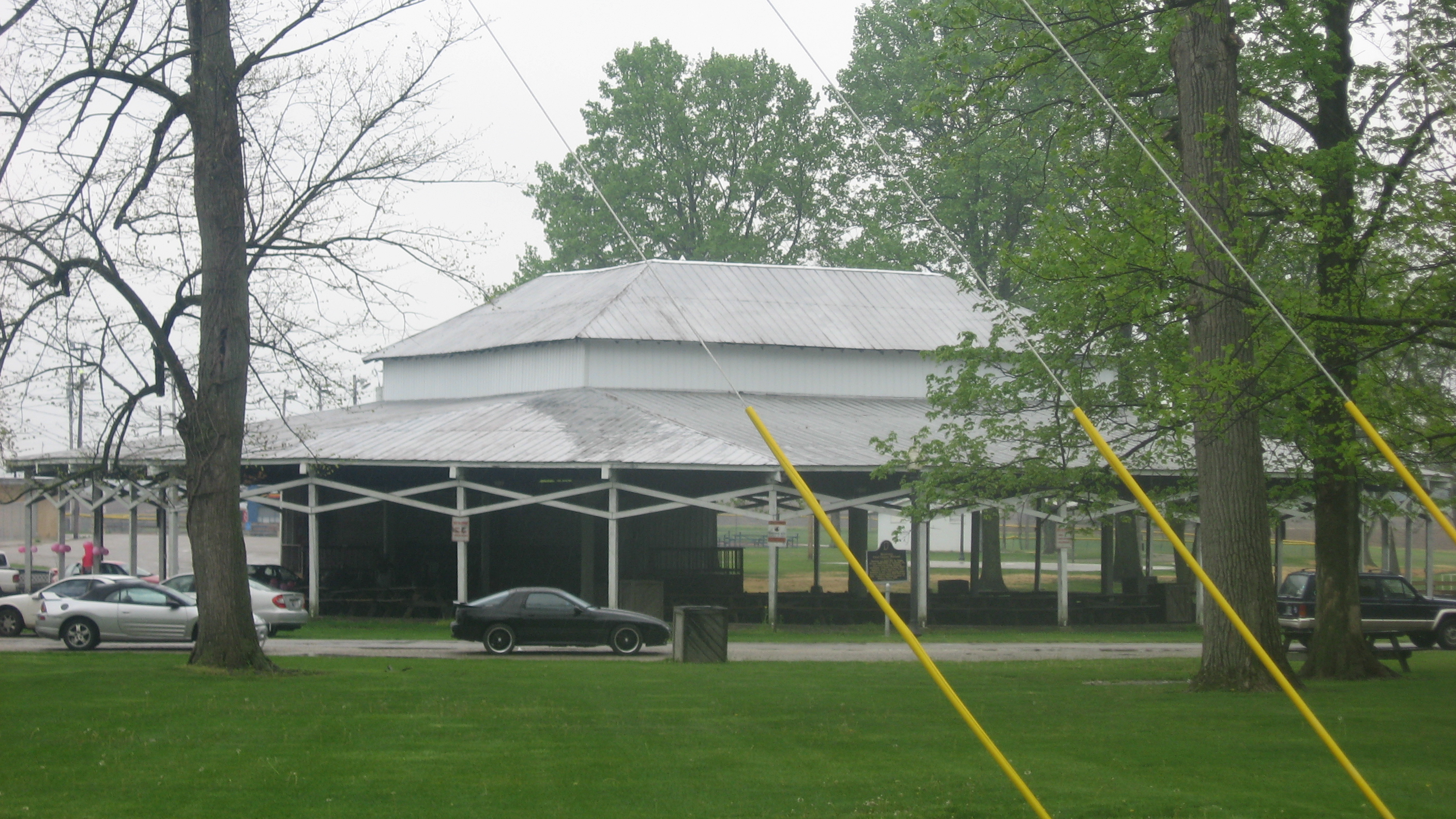
- Rockville Chautauqua Pavilion, April 2012

- Location within Parke County, Indiana Location within Indiana Location within the United States
- Location: College St. and Mecca Rd., Rockville, Indiana
- Coordinates: 39°45′35″N 87°14′6″W
- Area: 5 acres (2.0 ha)
- Built: 1913, 1928
- Architect: Edgar Jerome
- Architectural style: Howe truss
- NRHP reference No.: 99000301
- Added to NRHP: March 12, 1999

Rockville Chautauqua Pavilion, also known as Beechwood Park Pavilion, is a historic Chautauqua pavilion located at Rockville, Indiana, United States. The pavilion was built in 1913, and is a roughly octagonal heavy timber-frame building. It has a raised 1 1/2-story, clerestory square section with a decked hipped roof. Also on the property are the contributing park entry gates (1928), a picnic shelter, and a water fountain. The property hosted annual summer chautauquas from 1913 to 1930.

It was listed on the National Register of Historic Places in 1999.
