= Pleasant Valley Cemetery =

Indianan Cemetery and Church

- Interactive map of Pleasant Valley Cemetery

Details
- Location: Parke County, Indiana
- Coordinates: 39°40′10″N 87°9′5″W
- Find a Grave: Pleasant Valley Cemetery

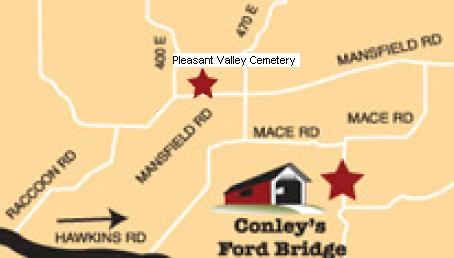
Map of Pleasant Valley Cemetery

Map of Pleasant Valley Cemetery in 1874

Pleasant Valley Cemetery and Pleasant Valley Methodist Church were formed in 1805 and are located in Parke County, Indiana.

== History ==
The house was located in Raccoon Township, Parke County, Indiana. The first pastor of the church was William Taylor. Some of the first historical members were James Strange, brother of John Strange, the noted pioneer Methodist Circuit Rider; Bliss Kalley, a native of Massachusetts; Tobias Miller; Jacob Overpeck, a native of Virginia; and Daniel Kalley. The families of these pioneers constituted a large part of the membership in the second generation. The member-ship increased to more than one hundred, and a new frame house was built about 1855. During the American Civil War, the house deteriorated, and services were stopped. In 1885 a new house was built, and services started again.

The church and cemetery are located on Mansfield Rd. 2.8 miles East of Mansfield, IN. 47872. Pleasant Valley Cemetery adjoins the church lot. It is difficult to locate this attraction, because many or the road names have been changed many times over the years and Mansfield Road is now called Country Road 37 (CR-37) on many mapping programs or GPS systems. It is also called East 700 South on some maps.

== Graves ==
Many pioneers are buried at Pleasant Valley Cemetery, Parke County, Indiana

- BENSON, MARJORIE ETHEL (b. 26 APR 1791, d. 3 JUN 1835)
- DEMPSEY, SEYBOLD
- DOWNEY, ASENATH (b. OCT 1783, d. 17 MAR 1864)
- GARRIGUS, ELIZABETH CATHERINE (b. 2 FEB 1853, d. 20 APR 1864)
- GARRIGUS, LAFAYETTE (b. 8 NOV 1840, d. 5 JAN 1842)
- GARRIGUS, LYDIA EVELINE (b. 11 MAY 1852, d. 10 MAR 1905)
- GARRIGUS, MARY LUCINDA (b. 4 NOV 1842, d. 5 SEP 1848)
- GARRIGUS, SOLOMAN BEACH (b. 7 AUG 1803, d. 3 MAY 1879)
- KERR, ELIZABETH (b. 18 SEP 1793 d. 2 FEB 1868)
- MCARTY, ROBERT LANGFORD
- MCARTY, MARGARET JANE
- NEVINS, GEORGE MARION (b. 6 AUG 1851, d. 11 MAR 1942)
- NEVINS, ROSCOE
- OVERPECK, JACOB (b. JAN 1774, d. DEC 1839)
- OVERPECK, MAGDALENA (b. 9 AUG 1781, d. 14 OCT 1854)
- SEYBOLD, DEMPSEY (b. 26 APR 1791, d. 3 JUN 1835)
- SEYBOLD, JOHN NELSON (b. 27 May 1846, d. 22 MAR 1922)
- STRANGE, JAMES (b. 18 OCT 1787, d. 1 MAY 1864)
- SNOW, CUSHING (b14 AUG 1790, d. 17 JAN 1849)
- THOMPSON, EMILY JANE (b. 25 MAY 1855, d. 1 JUN 1936)
- THOMPSON, ARTHUR C. (b. 11 FEB 1870, d. 3 JUN 1873)

== See also ==
- Mansfield, Indiana
