= Rockville, Indiana =

- Town
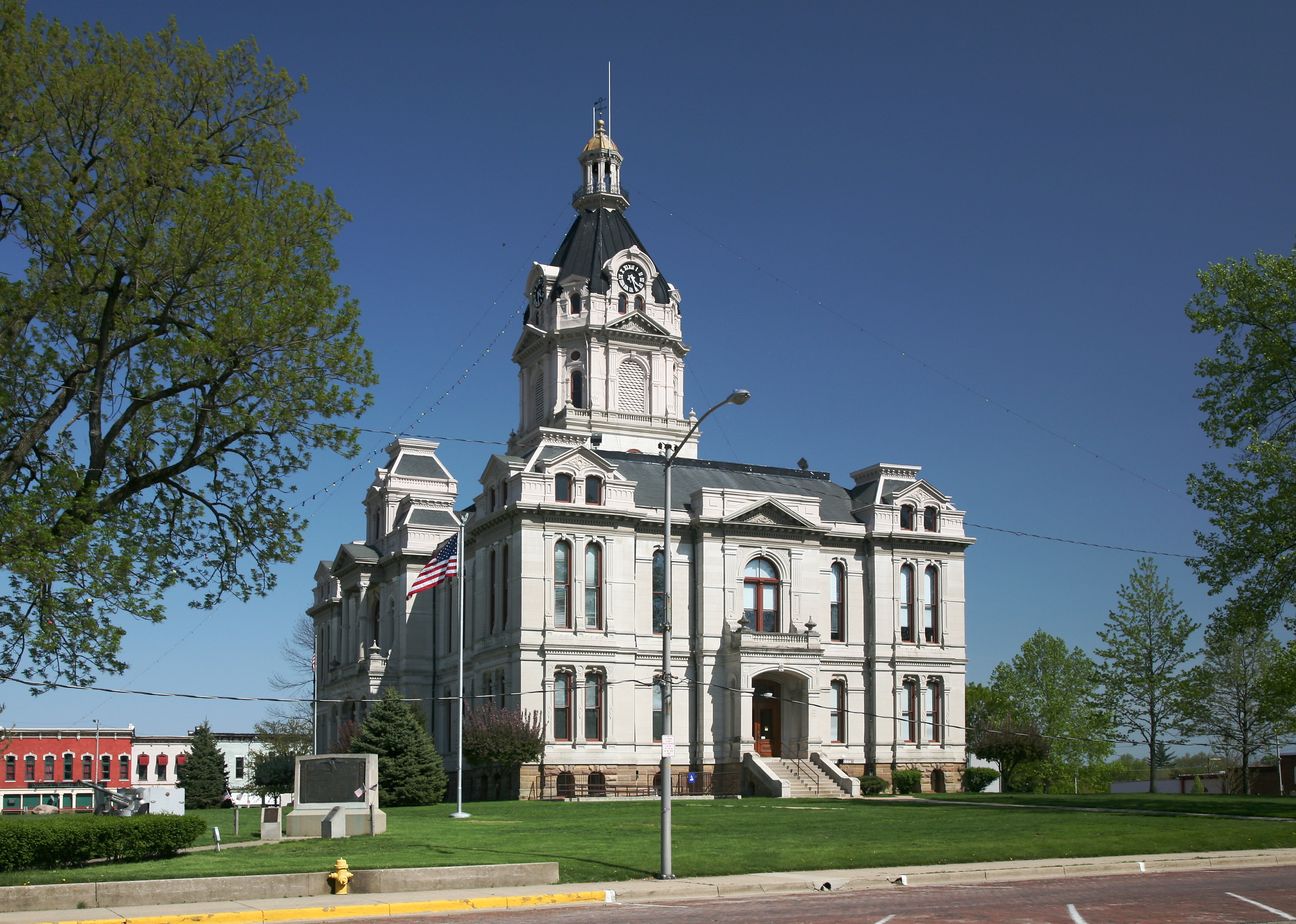

- Logo
- Nickname: Covered Bridge Capital of the World
- Location of Rockville in Parke County, Indiana.

- Location in Parke County
- Coordinates: 39°45′59″N 87°13′46″W
- Country: United States
- State: Indiana
- County: Parke
- Township: Adams
- Founded: 1824
- Incorporated: 1854

Area
  - Total: 1.49 sq mi (3.87 km^{2})
  - Land: 1.49 sq mi (3.87 km^{2})
  - Water: 0 sq mi (0.00 km^{2})
- Elevation: 692 ft (211 m)

Population (2020)
  - Total: 2,510
  - Density: 1,681.8/sq mi (649.35/km^{2})
- Time zone: UTC-5 (EST)
  - Summer (DST): UTC-4 (EDT)
- ZIP code: 47872
- Area code: 765
- FIPS code: 18-65520
- GNIS feature ID: 2396886
- Website: www.in.gov/towns/rockville/

Rockville is a town in Adams Township, Parke County, in the U.S. state of Indiana. As of the 2020 census, Rockville had a population of 2,510. The town is the county seat of Parke County. It is known as "The Covered Bridge Capital of the World".

== History ==
Rockville was laid out in 1824, three years after the county was founded, and became the county seat. In 1825, its population was between 500 and 600. The residents voted to incorporate the town in July 1854.

The Rockville Chautauqua Pavilion and Rockville Historic District are listed on the National Register of Historic Places.

An earthquake measuring 3.8 on the moment magnitude scale was recorded in the city and confirmed by the USGS on June 17, 2021, with numerous aftershocks reported in cities around the state and Illinois

== Geography ==
Map of Rockville

Rockville is located at the intersection of U.S. Route 36 and U.S. Route 41, about 30 miles (48 km) southwest of Crawfordsville.

According to the 2010 census, Rockville has a total area of 1.49 square miles (3.86 km^{2}), all land.

=== Climate ===
The climate in this area is characterized by hot, humid summers and generally mild to cool winters. According to the Köppen Climate Classification system, Rockville has a humid subtropical climate, abbreviated "Cfa" on climate maps.

Climate data for Rockville, Indiana (1991–2020)
Month	Jan	Feb	Mar	Apr	May	Jun	Jul	Aug	Sep	Oct	Nov	Dec	Year
Mean daily maximum °F (°C)	35.7 (2.1)	41.1 (5.1)	52.3 (11.3)	65.8 (18.8)	75.6 (24.2)	83.5 (28.6)	85.8 (29.9)	84.6 (29.2)	79.2 (26.2)	66.9 (19.4)	52.1 (11.2)	39.8 (4.3)	63.5 (17.5)
Daily mean °F (°C)	26.5 (−3.1)	30.9 (−0.6)	40.8 (4.9)	52.8 (11.6)	62.7 (17.1)	71.0 (21.7)	73.9 (23.3)	72.3 (22.4)	65.9 (18.8)	54.2 (12.3)	41.7 (5.4)	31.0 (−0.6)	52.0 (11.1)
Mean daily minimum °F (°C)	17.2 (−8.2)	20.6 (−6.3)	29.3 (−1.5)	39.7 (4.3)	49.7 (9.8)	58.4 (14.7)	62.0 (16.7)	60.0 (15.6)	52.7 (11.5)	41.6 (5.3)	31.4 (−0.3)	22.2 (−5.4)	40.4 (4.7)
Average precipitation inches (mm)	3.38 (86)	2.60 (66)	3.32 (84)	4.96 (126)	5.02 (128)	5.45 (138)	4.70 (119)	3.84 (98)	3.14 (80)	3.87 (98)	3.90 (99)	3.25 (83)	47.43 (1,205)
Average snowfall inches (cm)	5.1 (13)	2.8 (7.1)	1.1 (2.8)	0.1 (0.25)	0.0 (0.0)	0.0 (0.0)	0.0 (0.0)	0.0 (0.0)	0.0 (0.0)	0.0 (0.0)	0.3 (0.76)	3.6 (9.1)	13 (33.01)
Source: NOAA

== Demographics ==
Historical population
Census	Pop.	Note	%±
1850	726		—
1860	728		0.3%
1870	1,187		63.0%
1880	1,684		41.9%
1890	1,689		0.3%
1900	2,045		21.1%
1910	1,943		−5.0%
1920	1,908		−1.8%
1930	1,832		−4.0%
1940	2,208		20.5%
1950	2,467		11.7%
1960	2,756		11.7%
1970	2,820		2.3%
1980	2,785		−1.2%
1990	2,706		−2.8%
2000	2,765		2.2%
2010	2,607		−5.7%
2020	2,510		−3.7%
U.S. Decennial Census

=== 2020 census ===
As of the 2020 census, Rockville had a population of 2,510. The median age was 45.0 years. 22.4% of residents were under the age of 18 and 23.0% of residents were 65 years of age or older. For every 100 females there were 89.9 males, and for every 100 females age 18 and over there were 86.0 males age 18 and over.

0.0% of residents lived in urban areas, while 100.0% lived in rural areas.

There were 1,157 households in Rockville, of which 23.9% had children under the age of 18 living in them. Of all households, 37.9% were married-couple households, 20.8% were households with a male householder and no spouse or partner present, and 34.3% were households with a female householder and no spouse or partner present. About 38.4% of all households were made up of individuals and 17.6% had someone living alone who was 65 years of age or older.

There were 1,303 housing units, of which 11.2% were vacant. The homeowner vacancy rate was 3.6% and the rental vacancy rate was 9.1%.

Racial composition as of the 2020 census
Race	Number	Percent
White	2,396	95.5%
Black or African American	18	0.7%
American Indian and Alaska Native	9	0.4%
Asian	2	0.1%
Native Hawaiian and Other Pacific Islander	0	0.0%
Some other race	14	0.6%
Two or more races	71	2.8%
Hispanic or Latino (of any race)	41	1.6%

=== 2010 census ===
As of the census of 2010, there were 2,607 people, 1,212 households, and 679 families living in the town. The population density was 1,749.7 inhabitants per square mile (675.6/km^{2}). There were 1,394 housing units at an average density of 935.6 units per square mile (361.2 units/km^{2}). The racial makeup of the town was 98.7% White, 0.1% African American, 0.5% Native American, 0.2% Asian, 0.1% from other races, and 0.5% from two or more races. Hispanic or Latino of any race were 0.7% of the population.

There were 1,212 households, of which 24.6% had children under the age of 18 living with them, 39.9% were married couples living together, 12.8% had a female householder with no husband present, 3.3% had a male householder with no wife present, and 44.0% were non-families. 39.5% of all households were made up of individuals, and 20.1% had someone living alone who was 65 years of age or older. The average household size was 2.14 and the average family size was 2.82.

The median age in the town was 44.8 years. 20.9% of residents were under the age of 18; 8.1% were between the ages of 18 and 24; 21.2% were from 25 to 44; 27.4% were from 45 to 64; and 22.3% were 65 years of age or older. The gender makeup of the town was 46.8% male and 53.2% female.

=== 2000 census ===
As of the census of 2000, there were 2,765 people, 1,286 households, and 735 families living in the town. The population density was 1,924.4 inhabitants per square mile (743.0/km^{2}). There were 1,390 housing units at an average density of 967.4 units per square mile (373.5 units/km^{2}). The racial makeup of the town was 98.16% White, 0.14% African American, 0.47% Native American, 0.29% Asian, 0.22% from other races, and 0.72% from two or more races. Hispanic or Latino of any race were 0.83% of the population.

There were 1,286 households, out of which 24.4% had children under the age of 18 living with them, 43.5% were married couples living together, 10.8% had a female householder with no husband present, and 42.8% were non-families. 39.4% of all households were made up of individuals, and 23.0% had someone living alone who was 65 years of age or older. The average household size was 2.11 and the average family size was 2.82.

In the town, the population was spread out, with 21.5% under the age of 18, 6.9% from 18 to 24, 27.0% from 25 to 44, 20.9% from 45 to 64, and 23.7% who were 65 years of age or older. The median age was 42 years. For every 100 females, there were 81.1 males. For every 100 females age 18 and over, there were 77.0 males.

The median income for a household in the town was $27,813, and the median income for a family was $36,066. Males had a median income of $30,909 versus $21,745 for females. The per capita income for the town was $18,431. About 14.8% of families and 15.4% of the population were below the poverty line, including 28.0% of those under age 18 and 9.7% of those age 65 or over.

== Education ==
It is in the North Central Parke Community School Corporation. Formerly it was in the Rockville Community Schools school district.

The town has a lending library, the Rockville Public Library.

== Arts and culture ==
Rockville hosts the Parke County Covered Bridge Festival.

== Media ==
The earliest newspaper in the town was the Rockville Republican, a weekly that had gone by several names in its early years. The Rockville Republican had many editors over the years, eventually coming into the hands of the Hargrave family, who sold it to the Harneys in 1971. The Harneys had recently purchased The Rockville Tribune, and before the decade was out, they merged the two papers to form The Parke County Sentinel, which was still in operation as a weekly newspaper as of 2025.

In 1870, the Indiana Patriot was founded.

== Notable people ==
- Mark L. De Motte, U.S. representative from Indiana
- Morris K. Jessup, ufologist
- James T. Johnston, U.S. representative from Indiana
- Don Lash, long-distance runner and Indiana state representative
- J. Howard Moore, zoologist, philosopher, educator, and social reformer
- Joseph A. Wright, governor of Indiana and U.S. senator
