= List of lost covered bridges in Parke County, Indiana =

The "lost" covered bridges of Parke County covers the covered bridges of Parke County, Indiana, United States, that have been destroyed, either through floods, arson, or demolition.

Parke County is the self-proclaimed "Covered Bridge Capital of the World". It claims to have more covered bridges than any other county in the United States. At one time as many as 52 1/2 covered bridges existed in Parke County. The half bridge comes from a shared bridge with Vermillion County that crossed the Wabash River. Today 31 of those bridges survive, 10 of which have been closed to vehicle traffic. Because of the numerous streams and creeks meandering through the county and the ready natural resources to build the bridges, Parke County has many covered bridges.

== Construction ==
Almost all of the bridges exteriors were built of poplar wood, with interiors, trusses, arches and planking built of oak. The majority of the bridges were built using a Burr Arch or a double Burr Arch design.

Parke County had two bridge builders who built most of the bridges in the county. The first of these was J.J. Daniels. Born in 1826, in Marietta, Ohio, he built railroad bridges in Ohio and Indiana and 60 covered bridges in Indiana. Of these 60 bridges, 27 alone were in Parke County, with 11 of those still standing. The second was J.A. Britton. He was born just three miles east of Rockville, in 1838. Britton would built 17 covered bridges in Parke County, with 12 of those still standing.

== Bridgeton bridge arson ==
The Bridgeton bridge was burned by an arsonist in 2004, but the community rallied to raise funds for local craftsmen to build a new bridge in 2006, based on the original blueprints.

== List of bridges ==
Name	Image	Year built	Year destroyed	Design and length^{[A]}	Body of water crossed	Cause of destruction
Adams Covered Bridge		1907	1969	Burr Truss, 170 feet (52 m) long	Little Raccoon Creek	Flood
Armiesburg Covered Bridge		1854	1913	Long Truss, unknown feet long	Big Raccoon Creek	Flood
Bridgeton Covered Bridge		1868	2005	Burr Truss, 267 feet (81 m) long	Big Raccoon Creek	Arson, April 28, 2005
Clinton Covered Bridge		1853	1899	Long Truss, 790 feet (240 m) long	Wabash River	Dismantled using high voltage wires to cut through the trusses.
Coal Creek Covered Bridge		1869	1992	Burr Truss, 194 feet (59 m) long	Coal Creek	Arson, June 28, 1992
Dooley Station Covered Bridge		1917	1960	Burr Truss, 95 feet (29 m) long	Little Raccoon Creek	Arson, December 4, 1960
Grange Corner Covered Bridge		1899	1968	Burr Truss, 113 feet (34 m) long	Sugar Mill Creek	Flood
Greencastle Road Covered Bridge		1863 (before)	1863	Unknown, unknown feet long	Little Raccoon Creek	Dismantled
Harbison Covered Bridge		1916	1943	Burr Truss, unknown feet long	Big Raccoon Creek	Fire
Hargrave Covered Bridge		1847	1913	Burr Truss, unknown feet long	Big Raccoon Creek	Flood
Harrison Covered Bridge		1866	1876	Burr Truss, 250 feet (76 m) long	Sugar Creek	Dismantled
Hollandsburg Covered Bridge		1866	1930	Burr Truss, unknown feet long	Big Raccoon Creek	Dismantled
Howard Covered Bridge		1913	1931 or 1932	Burr Truss, unknown feet long	Sugar Creek	Dismantled
Jeffries Ford Covered Bridge		1915	2002	Burr Truss, 222 feet (68 m) long	Big Raccoon Creek	Arson, April 2, 2002
Jessup Covered Bridge		1910	1989	Burr Truss, 175 feet (53 m) long	Little Raccoon Creek	Flood
JH Russell Covered Bridge		1897	1983	Queen Truss, 50 feet (15 m) long	Sugar Creek, Square Rock Branch	Dismantled
Lusk Covered Bridge #1		1840	1847	Lattice Truss (unconfirmed), unknown feet long	Sugar Creek	Flood, January 1, 1847
Lusk Covered Bridge #2		1847	1875	Lattice Truss (unconfirmed), unknown feet long	Sugar Creek	Unknown
Moore Covered Bridge		1909	1957	Burr Truss, 81 feet (25 m) long	Little Raccoon Creek, South Fork	Flood
Plank Road Covered Bridge		1854 or 1859	1913	Burr Truss, unknown feet long	Little Raccoon Creek	Flood
Red Covered Bridge		1880	1976	Burr Truss, 276 feet (84 m) long	Big Raccoon Creek	Arson, October 13, 1976
Roaring Creek Covered Bridge		1863 (unconfirmed)	1923 and 1925	Unknown, unknown feet long	Roaring Creek	Dismantled
Roseville Covered Bridge		1866	1910	Burr Truss, 250 feet (76 m) long	Big Raccoon Creek	Arson, April 10, 1910
Star Mill Covered Bridge		1861	1866	Burr Truss, 250 feet (76 m) long	Sugar Creek	Flood
Turkey Run Covered Bridge		1865, 1866, or 1884	1914	Queen Truss, 50 feet (15 m) long	Turkey Run	Dismantled
Union Township Covered Bridge		1851	1872	Burr Truss, unknown feet long	Big Raccoon Creek	Dismantled
Weisner Covered Bridge		1908	1957	King Post, 63 feet (19 m) long	Weisner Creek	Flood

=== Notes ===
^{A} Sorting this column will result in bridges being listed in order by length.

== See also ==
- List of Registered Historic Places in Indiana
- List of Indiana covered bridges

== Bibliography ==
- "Parke County Past Bridges".
- "Bridge Builders and Plans". Archived from the original on February 19, 2015.
- McKee, Deb (April 15, 2006). "Parke County residents begin reconstructing Bridgeton landmark". tribstar.com.
