= Union Township Covered Bridge =

Bridge in United States of America

- Coordinates: 39°45′13.7″N 87°3′15.9″W
- Carries: Plank Road
- Crosses: Big Raccoon Creek
- Locale: Union Township, Indiana
- Other name(s): Hollandsburg Covered Bridge #1
- Named for: Union Township, Parke County

History
- Constructed by: J. J. Daniels
- Construction end: 1851
- Closed: 1872 Torn Down

The Union Township Covered Bridge was southeast of Hollandsburg, Indiana. The single-span Burr Arch covered bridge structure was built by J. J. Daniels in 1851 and torn down in 1872 during the rebuilding of the Plank Road into a toll-free road.

== History ==
=== Construction ===
This bridge was built when the Plank Road between Indianapolis and Montezuma was put in. The planks soon rotted however and the Parke County Commissioners purchased the road, graveled it, and made it a free road.

=== Destruction ===
As part of the renovation of the Plank Road the Parke County Commissioners had the bridge torn down and a new bridge, the Hollandsburg Covered Bridge, built to replace it.

== See also ==
- Parke County Covered Bridges
- Parke County Covered Bridge Festival
