= Lusk Covered Bridge =

Bridge in United States of America

- Coordinates: 39°53′28.74″N 87°11′7.15″W
- Crossed: Sugar Creek
- Locale: Parke, Indiana, United States
- Official name: Lusk Covered Bridge
- Named for: Salmon Lusk

History
- Constructed by: Salmon Lusk
- Built: 1840 (first); 1847 (second)
- Rebuilt: 1866 by William Blackledge
- Destroyed: 1847 (old); 1875 (new)

The Lusk Covered Bridge was once located north of Marshall, Indiana, United States. Two single-span dual lane Lattice Truss covered bridges were located at the site, one of which replaced the other. Salmon Lusk constructed the first bridge in 1840, and after its destruction by flood in 1847, Lusk constructed the second. Both bridges were located on private land; the only other such covered bridges in Parke County were the State Sanitorium Covered Bridge, the JH Russell Covered Bridge, and the Clinton Toll Bridge.

== First bridge ==
Vermont native, Captain Salmon Lusk, had been part of General William Henry Harrison's expedition in 1811. Being sent out to scout a Route to Prophet's Town he traveled up the east side of the Wabash River to the mouth of Sugar Creek, which he followed to the Narrows.

Eleven years later, his military service complete, he moved to this area with his wife Polly Beard Lusk. In 1825 he would use the one thousand acre grant that he had received for his military service to claim the land around the Narrows. In 1826 Lusk built a grist mill at the Narrows, where a small community would soon pop up. By 1840 a sturdy bridge was needed to cross Sugar Creek. At least two open bridges had already been built in the area. Records show that Salmon Lusk probably built a two lane covered bridge just upstream from the current bridge. The materials for the bridge would have probably came from his land.

On New Years Day, 1847, the Lusk Bridge, Lusk Mill, Prior Wright's Store and other buildings associated with these were washed away by a freshet on Sugar Creek.

== Second bridge ==
With the destruction of his first covered bridge at this spot on New Year's Day, 1847, Salmon Lusk would go on to rebuild the bridge that same year. This would be the fourth bridge built at this spot. The mill would not be rebuilt though and Prior Wright moved his business to Rockport, future site of the Jackson Covered Bridge.

Record for Parke County show that William Blacklege was hired to conduct repairs on the bridge in 1866 for $800. These were the same flooding waters that also damaged the Harrison Covered Bridge.

Little is known of its destruction; the only surviving details are the year (1875) and the time elapsed before its replacement. No bridge spanned Sugar Creek at the site until the Narrows Covered Bridge was built in 1882.

== See also ==
- Parke County Covered Bridges
- Parke County Covered Bridge Festival
- Lusk Home and Mill Site
