= Roseville-Coxville Covered Bridge =

Bridge southeast of Mecca, Indiana

Roseville Covered Bridge
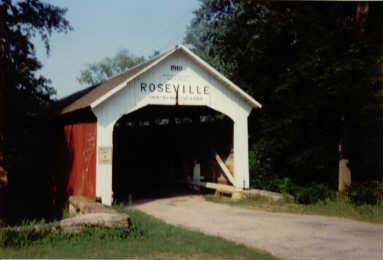
- Roseville Covered Bridge
- Coordinates: 39°39′8.03″N 87°17′37.8″W
- Carries: C.R. 325W
- Crosses: Big Raccoon Creek
- Locale: Parke County, Indiana, United States
- Official name: Roseville Covered Bridge
- Other name: Coxville Covered Bridge
- Named for: Roseville, Indiana
- Maintained by: Parke County
- NBI Number: 6100042

Characteristics
- Design: National Register of Historic Places
- Total length: 281 ft (86 m)263ft +9ft overhangs on each end
- Width: 16 ft (4.9 m)
- Height: 12.66 ft (3.86 m)

History
- Constructed by: J. J. Daniels
- Built: 1910
- Rebuilt: 1977
- Roseville-Coxville Covered Bridge
- U.S. National Register of Historic Places
- MPS: Parke County Covered Bridges TR
- NRHP reference No.: 78000409
- Added to NRHP: Dec 22, 1978

Location
- Interactive map of Roseville Covered Bridge

The Roseville Covered Bridge, also known as the Coxville covered bridge, is southeast of Mecca, Indiana. The double span Burr Arch covered bridge structure was built by Joseph J. Daniels in 1910. This is the third bridge at this location.

It was added to the National Register of Historic Places in 1978.

== History ==
When the 1865 J. J. Daniels Roseville Covered Bridge was destroyed by fire in 1910 the Parke County Commissioners thought that the bridge should be replaced with a concrete bridge. However, the bids must have come back prohibitively high because the bridge was replaced with the current covered bridge. This would later seem to be a good choice when the downstream Armiesburg Covered Bridge, that was replaced with a concrete bridge in 1917, would later collapse in 1930 after only 13 years while the Roseville Covered Bridge still stands.

Jefferson P. Van Fossen won the bid the replace the bridge. J. P. Van Fossen, together with his brother J. L. Van Fossen, were both being associated with the county road department and involved in constructing at least four Parke County covered bridges and foundations. J. P. also won the bid to construct the Jessup Covered Bridge in 1910. While witnesses from the construction site claim that the on-site foreman was J. J. Daniels, who would have been 84 years old at the time, a photograph of the nearly completed bridge shows the bridge portal lettering crediting J. P. Van Fossen as the Contractor and J. Brooks as the Builder. However, the on-site witnesses also claim to not remember Mr. Brooks and later portal lettering photographs show J. J. Daniels listed as builder, the bridge painted white and the portal opening are the trademark "Daniels Arches."

There may be other clues as to who the builder was but some of these just bring up more questions. The first would be that through the years in photographs and postcards the bridge portals have been repainted many times, at times red, brown, white, or even knocked away. This may very well explain the reason why the portals have transitioned into "Daniels Arches." The fact that the engraved sign boards were mounted too low caused them to be damaged and so the arches were flattened to their present shape. However, there is a picture of the first stone for the abutment loaded on a horse-drawn wagon. The Van Fossens tended to use poured concrete on their bridges while Daniels favored stone abutments.

== See also ==
- List of Registered Historic Places in Indiana
- Parke County Covered Bridges
- Parke County Covered Bridge Festival
