= Adams Covered Bridge, Indiana =

Adams Covered Bridge
- Coordinates: 39°46′52″N 87°8′42″W
- Carried: C.R. 100N
- Crossed: Little Raccoon Creek
- Locale: Adams Township
- Official name: Adams Covered Bridge
- Named for: The Adams Family
- WGCB Number: 14-61-23

Characteristics
- Total length: 170 ft (52 m)154ft +8ft overhangs on each end
- Width: 16 ft (4.9 m)
- Height: 12.5 ft (3.8 m)

History
- Constructed by: Adams Construction
- Opened: 1907
- Collapsed: 1969 Flood

The Adams Covered Bridge was east of Rockville, Indiana. The single-span Burr Arch covered bridge structure was built by Adams Construction in 1907 and destroyed by flood in 1969.

== History ==
Philip Adams, who was an Ohio veteran of the War of 1812, purchased 80 acres of land in Parke County in 1835. His son, Harvey Adams, continued to farm and by 1893 had acquired 2300 acres in Parke County. By 1959 Roy Adams still owned over 1500 acres and as late as 1990 Adams Farms Inc. owned the same acreage. The bridge was built on land owned by the Adams Family.

The bridge got its "Ray's Bridge" name from the fact that the crossing had earlier been called Ray's Ford from the grist mill that Mr. Ray owned upstream from the ford.

Even though the Adams Construction was awarded the contract to build the bridge apparently they subcontracted the Frankfort Construction Company to actually build it. J.P. Van Fossen, in turn, was the onsite foreman for the project.

After the bridge was destroyed in 1969 the Jessup Covered Bridge was moved to replace it. This bridge was also destroyed by a flood in 1989 when it washed downstream under the State Sanitorium Covered Bridge and then over the U.S. 36 concrete bridge at the Plank Road Covered Bridge site.

== See also ==
- Parke County Covered Bridges
- Parke County Covered Bridge Festival
