= Neet Covered Bridge =

Place in Indiana listed on National Register of Historic Places

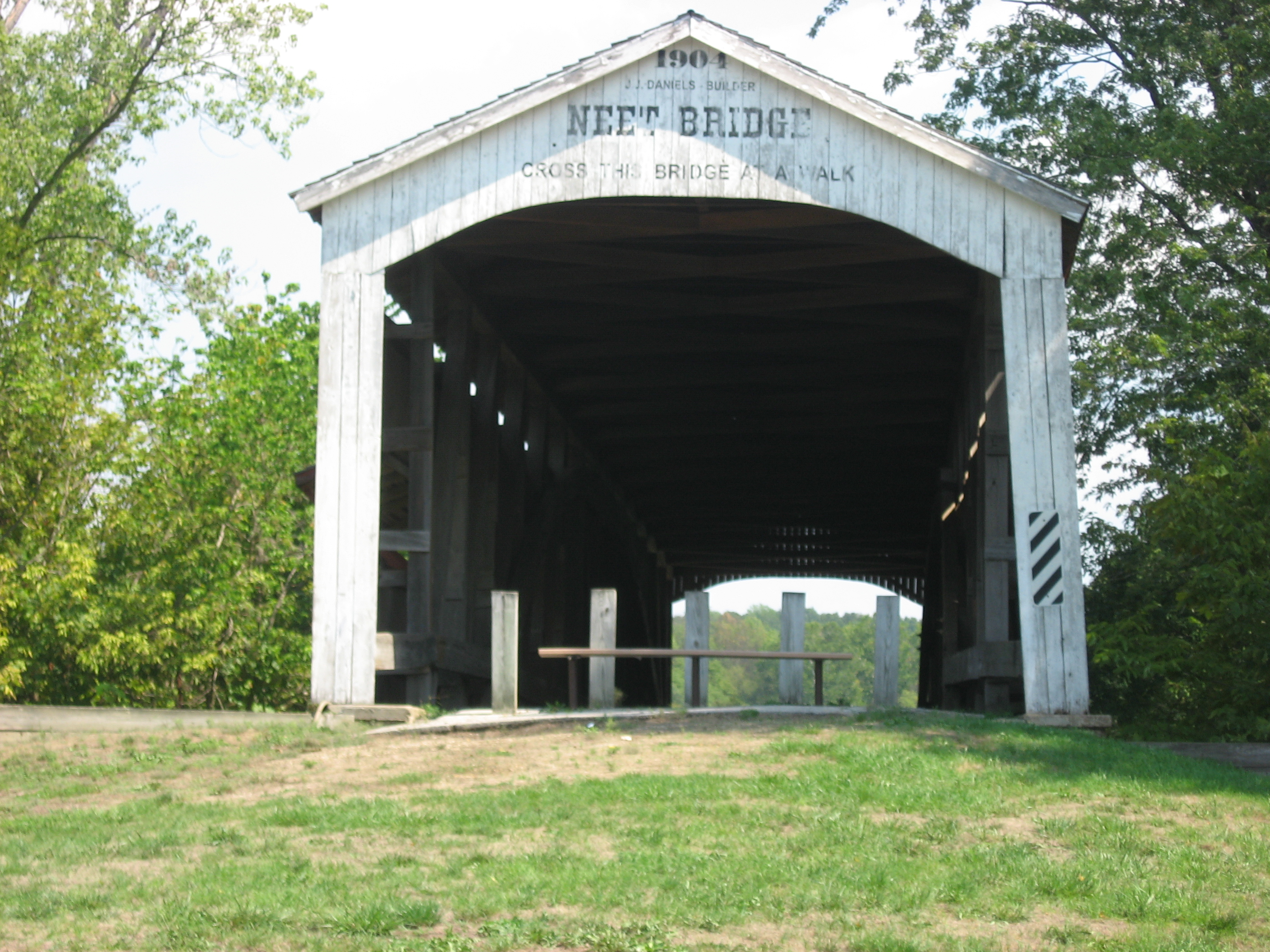
- Western Portal
- Coordinates: 39°42′6.2″N 87°11′52.75″W
- Crosses: Little Raccoon Creek
- Locale: Parke County, Indiana, United States
- Official name: Neet Covered Bridge
- Other name: Dietrich Bridge
- Named for: Joseph W. Neet or Robert E. Detrich
- Maintained by: Parke County
- WGCB Number: 14-61-18

Characteristics
- Design: National Register of Historic Places
- Total length: 144 ft (44 m)126ft +9ft overhangs on each end
- Width: 16 ft (4.9 m)
- Height: 14 ft (4.3 m)

History
- Constructed by: J. J. Daniels
- Built: 1904
- Neet Covered Bridge
- U.S. National Register of Historic Places
- MPS: Parke County Covered Bridges TR
- NRHP reference No.: 78000405
- Added to NRHP: Dec 22, 1978

Location
- Interactive map of Neet Covered Bridge

The Neet Covered Bridge is a Burr Arch single span structure that was built by Joseph J. Daniels in 1904 over Little Raccoon Creek southwest of Rockville, Indiana.

It was added to the National Register of Historic Places in 1978.

== History ==
This was the last bridge contracted by Joseph J. Daniels. He was 78 at the time, though he may have been the builder of the Roseville-Coxville Covered Bridge built 6 years later that had been contracted by J.P. Van Fossen. He would have been 84 years old by this time.

The 1908 Atlas of Parke County doesn't show any property near the bridge being owned by anyone in the Neet family while Enoch Shrigley referred to it as the Joe Neet Bridge. Joseph W. Neet had been born in 1862 and owned 176 acres in section 33, and the bridge is on the west side of section 33. George M. Neet, born in 1869, rented 20 acres north of the bridge. Robert E. Detrich later owned property at the bridge through 1959 and by 1990 owned 40 acres further from the bridge which is listed as Detrich Tree Farm.

The Central Indiana Railroad crossed Little Raccoon Creek just north of the bridge.

On March 25, 1989, Rockville Boy Scout Troop 469 repainted the bridge with 4 gallons of paint. A note on the bridge credits Ted Gahimer, Bruce Girdler, Matt Garrett, and Shawn Taylor as the painters. As of 2010, the bridge and the area around it were being maintained by neighbors Bob Lowdermilk and John Tilton.

== See also ==
- List of Registered Historic Places in Indiana
- Parke County Covered Bridges
- Parke County Covered Bridge Festival
