= J. H. Russell Covered Bridge =

- Coordinates: 39°52′29.26″N 87°15′28.08″W
- Crosses: Square Rock Branch of Sugar Creek
- Locale: Parke County, Indiana, United States
- Official name: J. H. Russell Covered Bridge
- Other name: Jordan Covered Bridge
- Named for: J. H. Russell
- WGCB Number: 14-61-39

Characteristics
- Total length: 50 ft (15 m)42ft +4' overhangs on each end
- Width: 12 ft (3.7 m)
- Height: 12 ft (3.7 m)

History
- Constructed by: Pearly Weaver and George Weaver
- Built: 1897

The J. H. Russell Covered Bridge was north of Annapolis, Indiana. The single-span Modified Queen Truss covered bridge structure was built by Pearly Weaver and George Weaver in 1897 and destroyed by deterioration. It was one of five bridges in Parke County to be on private land. The others were the State Sanitorium Covered Bridge, Lusk Covered Bridge 1840, Lusk Covered Bridge 1847, and the Clinton Toll Bridge. It was also one of two Queen Truss tupe covered bridges, the other being the Turkey Run Covered Bridge

== History ==
=== Construction ===
In 1897, at the age of 24, Pearly Weaver and his brother George agreed to build the bridge, at $2.50/day, for J. H. Russell. Securing a book, because he had no experience building bridges, he drew up the plans himself. He hired a craftsman, who had just finished a similar job nearby, to construct the abutments. A derrick was set up and stones from the stream bed were lifted into place. The stones, being uniform in thickness, were where the creek got its name, Square Rock Branch. Most of the materials for the bridge were secured from resources on the Russell Farm. Looking through the woods Pearly was able to find two oak trees that were tall enough and straight enough to make the stringer beams. The oaks were 2 1/2' in diameter at the base, 50' long, and squaring 12" at the top. An old cabin, located nearby, was the source of the clear poplar used for the joists, side posts, and the nail ties on the bridge. For the trusses, again, maple and oak trees found on the farm were used. All of this helped keep the final cost of the bridge down.

=== Destruction ===
Ralph Jordan would later buy the farm and the bridge. In 1944 he built an airport called Port O' the Woods. In 1970 the bridge would be moved to dry ground to be used as a barn, but it deteriorated and had to be torn down in 1983.

== See also ==
- Parke County Covered Bridges
- Parke County Covered Bridge Festival
