= Hollandsburg Covered Bridge =

- Coordinates: 39°45′13.7″N 87°3′15.9″W
- Carried: Plank Road
- Crossed: Big Raccoon Creek
- Locale: Hollandsburg, Indiana, Parke, Indiana, United States
- Official name: Hollandsburg Covered Bridge
- Named for: Hollandsburg, Indiana

History
- Constructed by: J. J. Daniels
- Built: 1866
- Destroyed: 1930 Torn Down

Location
- Interactive map of Hollandsburg Covered Bridge

The Hollandsburg Covered Bridge was southeast of Hollandsburg, Indiana. The single-span Burr Arch covered bridge structure was built by J. J. Daniels in 1872 and torn down in 1930 during the expansion of U.S. Route 36 (US 36).

== History ==
=== Construction ===
This bridge replaced the previous Union Township Covered Bridge. The original bridge was built when the Plank Road between Indianapolis and Montezuma was put in. The planks soon rotted, however, and the Parke County Commissioners purchased the road, graveled it, and made it a free road. The new bridge was put in when the Plank Road was rebuilt.

In early 1872 the Parke County Commissioners put out advertisements for bids for the Hollandsburg Bridge. On April 9, 1872, the bids were opened. They included a bid from Joseph J. Daniels for $7,000 and William Blackledge and James Moyers for $7,300. Blackledge and Moyers also had competitive bids with Daniels for the Mecca Covered Bridge in 1873.

=== Destruction ===
When it was decided that the new US 36 would go through Parke County, they picked the old Plank Road as the route. Around 1930, during the construction of US 36 going through this section of the county and despite worker intimidation, the bridge was torn down. Upset over the towage rate scale and hiring practices, a truck load of angry men drove out to the bridge site and made threats. The Parke County Sheriff in turn deputized a posse of 15 men who were stationed at the Rockville jail and two Indiana State Policemen patrolled the area. The U.S. Marshal would later issue subpoenas to 15 people in Clinton and Montezuma. Despite more threats along the route and in Motezuma, no trouble ever came.

In 1961, US 36 east of Hollandsburg was straightened and a new bridge built in preparations for the new Mansfield Reservoir. The area of the Hollandsburg Bridge, and the Hargrave, Harbison, Harrison, and Portland Mills Bridges, was flooded.

== See also ==
- Parke County Covered Bridges
- Parke County Covered Bridge Festival
