= Star Mill Covered Bridge =

- Coordinates: 39°51′17.75″N 87°20′8.75″W
- Carried: Tow Path Road
- Crossed: Sugar Creek
- Locale: West Union, Indiana, Parke, Indiana, United States
- Official name: Star Mill Covered Bridge
- Other name: Harrison Covered Bridge
- Named for: The Star Mill

Characteristics
- Total length: 250 ft (76 m)

History
- Constructed by: J. J. Daniels
- Built: 1861
- Destroyed: 1866 J. J. Daniels paid $286.66 to remove from creek

Location
- Interactive map of Star Mill Covered Bridge

The Star Mill Covered Bridge was north of West Union, Indiana. The double-span Burr Arch covered bridge structure was built by J. J. Daniels in 1861 and destroyed by flood waters in 1866.

== History ==
=== Construction ===
This was the first of three bridges to be built at this location in a fifteen-year span. The second bridge, the Harrison Covered Bridge, would be built five years later and only last ten years before the West Union Covered Bridge would be built, which is still standing as of 2015.

Joseph J. Daniels wrote a letter to the Parke County Commissioners in 1859, acting as an agent for his brother, William D. Daniels, seeking the contracts to build two bridges over Sugar Creek. One at Star Mill, north of West Union, and one at west of Rockport, the Jackson Covered Bridge.

The Parke County Commissioners called a special meeting on December 28, 1860, on behalf of Dr. Hobbs, who was representing several citizens, to present a petition for a covered bridge at Rockport. John Scott presented a petition and subscriptions at the same meeting for a bridge at Star Mill.

On January 1, 1861, another special session was call by the County Commissioners where $8,000 was approved for both location provided that the citizens would provide subscriptions to make up for the total cost. James Johnson and Henry Wolf were appointed to select suitable locations for the bridges along with specifications and costs.

By the summer of 1861, the West Union site had raised $2,747 with eight men agreeing to make up the difference to $8,000. The Rockport site had raised $3,037 with six men agreeing to make up the difference to $8,000. William D. Daniels was awarded the contracts for both bridges with the provision that they must be completed by the end of the year, 1861.

=== Repair and destruction ===
The bridge was inspected and the rods tightened in 1863 by J. J. Daniels and, although this bridge probably had the same design and was tied down like the Jackson Covered Bridge, upstream, it did not withstand the flood of 1866.

== See also ==
- Parke County Covered Bridges
- Parke County Covered Bridge Festival
