= Grange Corner Covered Bridge =

- Coordinates: 39°56′23.17″N 87°12′31.46″W
- Carries: C.R. 1200N
- Crosses: Sugar Mill Creek
- Locale: Parke, Indiana, United States
- Official name: Grange Corner Covered Bridge
- Other name: Delp Covered Bridge
- Named for: Grange Corner, Indiana
- WGCB Number: 14-61-37

Characteristics
- Total length: 113 ft (34 m)

History
- Constructed by: J. J. Daniels
- Built: 1899

Location
- Interactive map of Grange Corner Covered Bridge

The Grange Corner Covered Bridge was west of Grange Corner, Indiana. The single-span Burr Arch covered bridge structure was built by the J. J. Daniels in 1899 and destroyed by flood in 1968.

== History ==
=== Construction ===
J. J. Daniels had placed two bids for the construction of the bridge. The first was for $1,485 for just the superstructure and the second was $2,520 for the superstructure and the abutments. Meanwhile, Thomas Alward had placed a bid for $945 for the abutments. With Daniels bid of $1,485 and Alward's for $945 totaling $2,430 the contract was split between the two contractors. This was a common practice to award the bridge and abutments separately and even when awarded to one bidder the abutments sometimes were subcontracted anyway.

=== Destruction ===
Even though the Grange Corner Covered Bridge was eventually lost to a flood in 1968 when one of the abutments washed away the real reason can be traced back to politics. It could be said that the bridge was lost to a bureaucratic game of "chicken." The abutments had been inspected and declared unsafe, but with the Parke County Highway Department trying to maintain county roads with a limited budget often conflicting with Parke County Incorporated's goal of maintaining covered bridge, Grange Corner Covered Bridge was stuck in the middle. Repairs had to be deferred while funding for the repairs was sought. However, the flood came before the funds and the bridge fell into the creek bed.

Witnesses would later claim that the bridge was not destroyed and they felt the bridge could have been jacked out of the creek bed and removed as a complete unit in hopes of preserving or moving the bridge. Conflicting photographs show that the bridge was in much worse conditions though. But with no funds available to do this the County would only release enough funds to demolish the bridge.

== See also ==
- Parke County Covered Bridges
- Parke County Covered Bridge Festival
