= Harbison Covered Bridge =

- Coordinates: 39.774728°N 87.039186°W
- Crosses: Big Raccoon Creek
- Locale: Union Township, Indiana
- Official name: Harbison Covered Bridge
- Named for: The Harbison Family
- WGCB Number: 12-61-22

Characteristics
- Design: Burr Arch truss single-span bridge
- Material: Wood
- Traversable?: No

History
- Constructed by: J.A. Britton
- Opening: 1847
- Rebuilt: 1916 (flood)
- Closed: 1943 (fire)
- Replaces: Hargrave Covered Bridge

The Harbison Covered Bridge was west of Portland Mills, Indiana. The single-span Burr Arch covered bridge structure was built by J.A. Britton in 1916 and destroyed by a fire in 1943.

== History ==
The bridge was named after the Harbison family that owned land around the Portland Mills area. It replaced the earlier 1847 Hargrave Covered Bridge that had been lost in the Great Flood of 1913.

This bridge would be lost though on December 22, 1943, when a truck wrecked and ruptured an oil pipeline. The oil that leaked from the pipeline saturated the bridge and ignited. The bridge burned down very quickly and was unable to be saved.

The Harbison Bridge site is now flooded by the creation of the Cecil B. Harden Lake during most of the year.

== See also ==
- Parke County Covered Bridges
- Parke County Covered Bridge Festival
