= Melcher Covered Bridge =

Historic site in Indiana, US

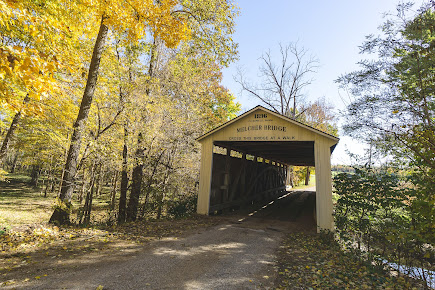
- Coordinates: 39°47′20.76″N 87°20′6.35″W
- Carries: Strawberry Road
- Crosses: Leatherwood Creek, Indiana
- Locale: Parke County, Indiana, United States
- Official name: Melcher Covered Bridge
- Other name(s): Klondyke Bridge, Marion Bridge, and Leatherwood Bridge
- Named for: Melcher Railroad Station
- Maintained by: Parke County
- NBI Number: 6100140

Characteristics
- Design: National Register of Historic Places
- Total length: 97 ft (30 m)83ft +7ft overhangs on each end
- Width: 16 ft (4.9 m)
- Height: 12.5 ft (3.8 m)

History
- Constructed by: J. J. Daniels
- Built: 1896
- Rebuilt: 1977
- Melcher Covered Bridge
- U.S. National Register of Historic Places
- MPS: Parke County Covered Bridges TR
- NRHP reference No.: 78000402
- Added to NRHP: Dec 22, 1978

Location
- Interactive map of Melcher Covered Bridge

The Melcher Covered Bridge, also known as the "Klondyke Covered Bridge", "Marion Covered Bridge", or the "Leatherwood Covered Bridge" crosses Leatherwood Creek east of Montezuma, Indiana, and is a single-span Burr Arch Truss covered bridge structure that was built by Joseph J. Daniels in 1896.

It was added to the National Register of Historic Places in 1978.

== History ==
The name "Melcher Covered Bridge" comes from the nearby Melcher Station which was originally on the Cincinnati, Hamilton and Dayton Railway (1846–1917). The CH&D and the Chicago and Eastern Illinois Railroad crossed just west of the bridge.

The name "Marion Covered Bridge" comes from the Marion Brick Company which was south and west of the bridge. The bridge may have been built to provide road access to Montezuma located two miles west.

The name "Klondyke Covered Bridge" comes from the nearby community of Klondyke, named after the Klondike Gold Rush, but in this case it was clay for bricks.

The name "Leatherwood Covered Bridge" was used but would cause confusion with Leatherwood Station Covered Bridge and Leatherwood Ford.

While the bridge was built by J. J. Daniels the portals no longer have his trademark portal arches. The portals have been modified to closer resemble those built by William Hendricks and Joseph A. Britton on their shorter bridges.

The original shale of the shale and hewn limestone abutments, which matches stone in the creek, has crumbled so cement was poured around the original stone.

== See also ==
- List of Registered Historic Places in Indiana
- Parke County Covered Bridges
- Parke County Covered Bridge Festival
