= Coal Creek Covered Bridge =

- Coordinates: 39°56′53.42″N 87°24′10.6″W
- Carries: C.R. 1200N
- Crosses: Coal Creek, Parke County, Indiana
- Locale: Lodi, Indiana, United States
- Other name: Lodi Covered Bridge
- Named for: Coal Creek
- WGCB Number: 14-61-30

Characteristics
- Total length: 194 ft (59 m)170ft +12ft overhangs on each end
- Height: 13 ft (4.0 m)

History
- Constructed by: J. J. Daniels
- Construction end: 1869
- Closed: June 28, 1992 Arson

The Coal Creek Covered Bridge was on the east side of Lodi, Indiana. The Burr Arch single span style bridge crossed Coal Creek and was built by J. J. Daniels in 1869. It was destroyed by arson on June 28, 1992.

== History ==
The Parke County Commissioners paid J. J. Daniels $2.25 in 1873 to inspect the bridge. In 1874 the embankment was repaired. He would later return in 1898 to do further repairs to the bridge after it had received some major damage. He said that it was harder to do the repairs the bridge than it had been to build it originally.

== See also ==
- Parke County Covered Bridges
- Parke County Covered Bridge Festival
