= Turkey Run Covered Bridge =

- Coordinates: 39°53′0.74″N 87°1′34.54″W
- Carries: State Road 49
- Crosses: Turkey Run (Indiana)
- Locale: Parke, Indiana, United States
- Official name: Turkey Run Covered Bridge
- Other name(s): Turkey Run Hollow Covered Bridge
- Named for: Turkey Run

Characteristics
- Total length: 50 ft (15 m)

History
- Constructed by: J. J. Daniels
- Built: 1865, 1866, or 1884

The Turkey Run Covered Bridge was north of Marshall, Indiana. The single-span Modified Queen Truss covered bridge structure was built by Joseph J. Daniels in 1865, 1866 or 1884, according to several conflicting sources, and dismantled in 1914 by order of the Parke County Commissioners, the abutments remain. It was one of two Queen Truss type covered bridges, the other being the JH Russell Covered Bridge.

== History ==
George E. Gould, author of Indiana Covered Bridges Thru the Years, states the Turkey Run Covered Bridge had been built by J. J. Daniels in 1866. However, another source seems to contend that the bridge was built in 1884. A photograph of the bridge clearly shows a Britton Portal with its flat top and corners at 130 degree angles. This could be evidence of a second bridge being built here by J. A. Britton in 1884, or that Britton had made extensive repairs to the bridge at some point.

== See also ==
- Parke County Covered Bridges
- Parke County Covered Bridge Festival
