= Greencastle Road Covered Bridge =

- Coordinates: 39°38′35.54″N 87°16′25.72″W
- Carries: Greencastle Road
- Crosses: Little Racoon Creek
- Locale: Parke, Indiana, United States
- Official name: Greencastle Road Covered Bridge
- Named for: Greencastle Road

History
- Constructed by: Henry Wolf (unconfirmed)
- Built: Before 1863

Location
- Interactive map of Greencastle Road Covered Bridge

The Greencastle Road Covered Bridge is a "lost" bridge in the truest of senses, not only is it gone, but the exact records of where, if at all, it existed have been lost to history. Henry Wolf probably built it sometime before 1863 on a section of Greencastle Road that no longer exists.

== History ==
=== Construction ===
There are Parke County records showing that in 1863 J.J. Daniels was paid $40 to repair the Greencastle Road Covered Bridge and that later that year he was also contracted to dismantle the bridge. After dismantling the bridge the pieces were piled nearby with the intention of rebuilding the bridge at another location. In 1865 the County Commissioners considered a location 300 yards upstream, "in line with a certain dead oak tree," to be a fitting location to move the bridge to. However, Dan Chamberlain's research would indicate that the bridge was never moved and relocated to this spot and that it probably went on to rot where it had been piled by Daniels. Another theory though, by Juliet Snowden, is that the actual bridge referred to is the bridge on the Rockville-Greencastle Road, now call the New Discovery Road, and that Daniels used the parts from the bridge to build the Crooks Covered Bridge in 1867.

== See also ==
- Parke County Covered Bridges
- Parke County Covered Bridge Festival
