= Portland Mills Covered Bridge =

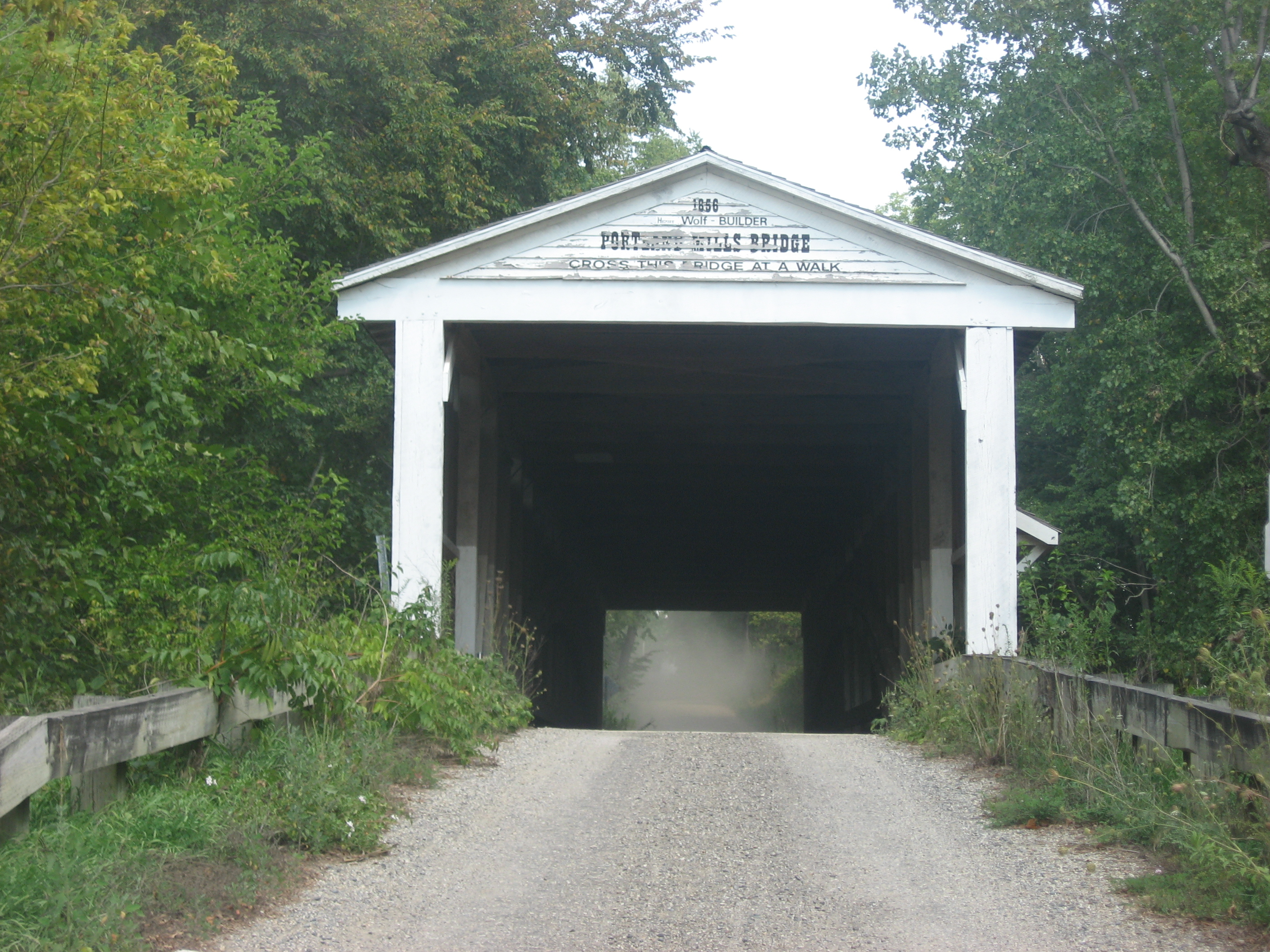
- Portland Mills Covered Bridge
- Coordinates: 39°51′38.67″N 87°5′19.66″W
- Carries: C.R. E650N
- Crosses: Little Raccoon Creek
- Locale: Parke County, Indiana, United States
- Official name: Portland Mills Covered Bridge
- Named for: Portland Mills
- Maintained by: Parke County
- NBI Number: 6100112

Characteristics
- Design: National Register of Historic Places
- Total length: 146 ft (45 m)130ft +8ft overhangs on each end
- Width: 16 ft (4.9 m)
- Height: 13 ft (4.0 m)

History
- Constructed by: Wolf, Henry
- Built: 1856
- Portland Mills Covered Bridge
- U.S. National Register of Historic Places
- MPS: Parke County Covered Bridges TR
- NRHP reference No.: 78000408
- Added to NRHP: Dec 22, 1978

Location
- Interactive map of Portland Mills Covered Bridge

The Portland Mills Covered Bridge is the second oldest covered bridge in Parke County, Indiana, being built the same year as the Crooks Covered Bridge. It is a single span Burr Arch Truss covered bridge that was built by Henry Wolf in 1856.

It was added to the National Register of Historic Places in 1978.

== History ==
The village of Portland Mills was settled in 1821 by Samuel Steele on the Parke-Putnam county line. Working to clear the land for farming he later built a mill in 1825 on Big Raccoon Creek. The grain mill had a water turbine (as opposed to a water wheel) and a sawmill. The mill would go through several owners, including William Butcher, Jesse Thompson, and Wesley Holman. Holman would build a new three story mill on a solid sandstone foundation and obtained modern machinery. This mill would go through several owners, including Hirem Hocker, John Blake, Jacob Culver, James Williams, and a Mr. Williams.

Although the Parke County Covered Bridge website claims the bridge was originally located in Union Township, 1874 plat maps suggest the bridge may have stood in the southeast corner of Greene Township. The exact location was lost after Big Raccoon Creek was flooded in 1961 to create Mansfield Lake (now Cecil M. Harden Lake); the bridge appears to have been near 39°46′44.22″N 87°0′54.43″W.

Because of that flooding, the bridge was moved in January 1961 to replace Dooley Station Covered Bridge, which had been destroyed by arson in 1960. After relocation it suffered neglect: roof and siding damage allowed rain in, and the northeast corner sustained fire damage. The bridge was closed in 1982 and bypassed by a ford; by the 1990s it was at serious rick of collapse. Grant funding and help from local organizations and donations allowed it to be restored in 1996, and the bridge was reopened to traffic until around November 2025, when it was closed due to damage from powder beetles.

== Gallery ==
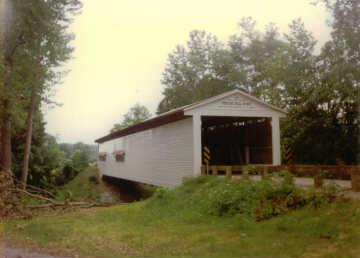

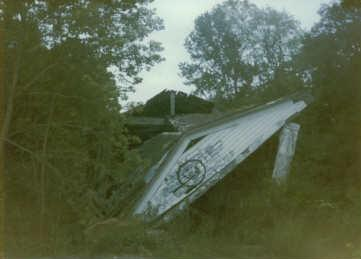
Collapsed portal prior to the 1996 renovation

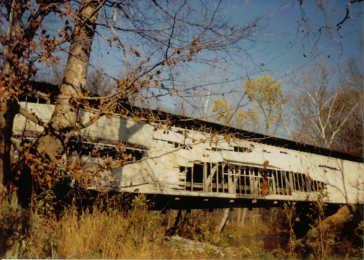
Extensive missing siding prior to the 1996 renovation

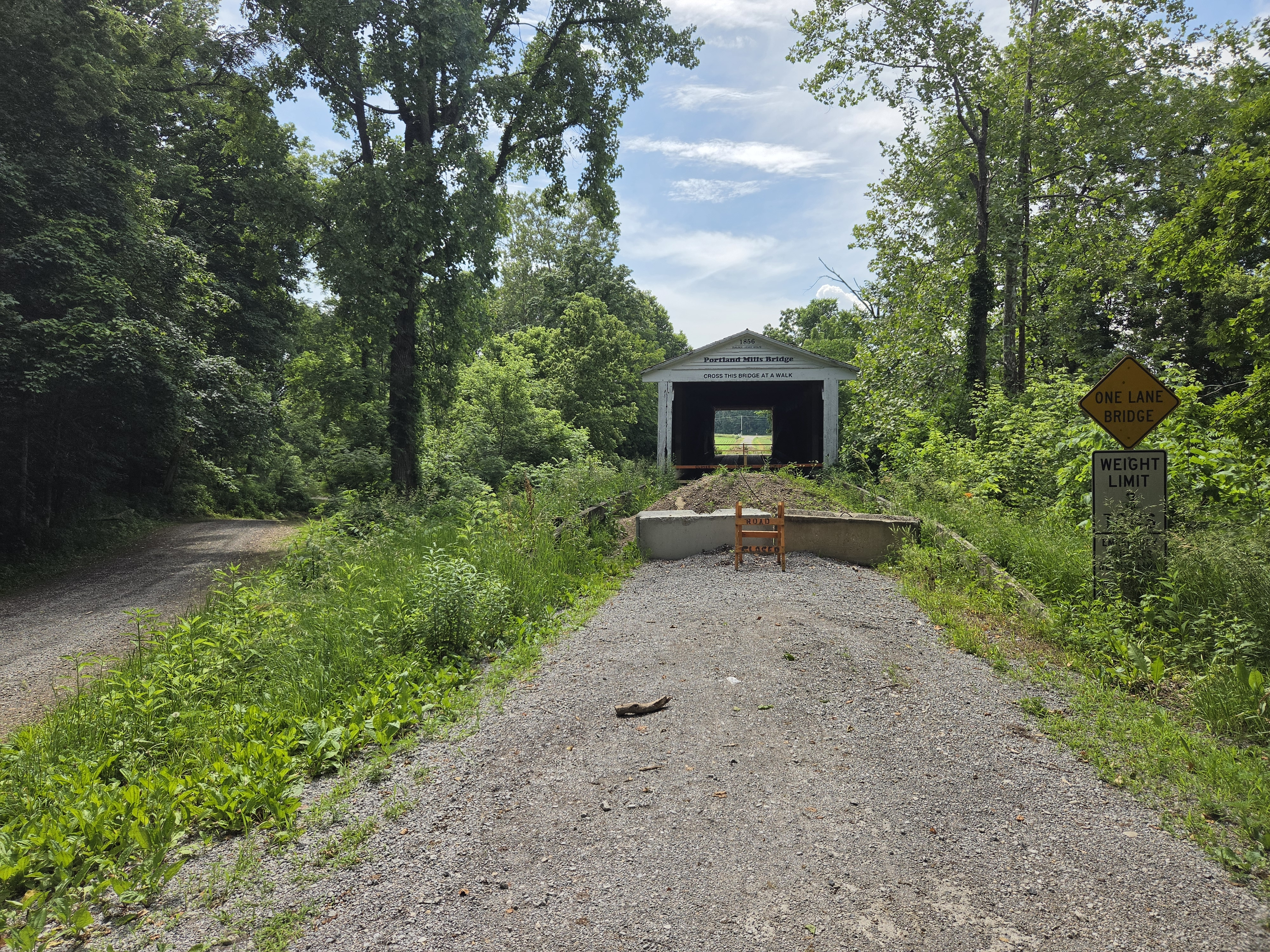
The closed bridge as of June 2026

== See also ==
- List of Registered Historic Places in Indiana
- Parke County Covered Bridges
- Parke County Covered Bridge Festival
