= Moore Covered Bridge =

- Coordinates: 39°49′37.39″N 87°5′16.48″W
- Crossed: South Fork Little Raccoon Creek
- Locale: Parke, Indiana, United States
- Official name: Moore Covered Bridge
- Named for: The Moore Farm

Characteristics
- Total length: 81 ft (25 m)65ft +8ft overhangs on each end
- Width: 16 ft (4.9 m)

History
- Constructed by: Britton, J.A.
- Built: 1909
- Destroyed: 1957 Flood

Location
- Interactive map of Moore Covered Bridge

The Moore Covered Bridge was a bridge northeast of Judson, Indiana. The single-span Burr Arch covered bridge structure was built by Joseph A. Britton in 1909 and destroyed by a flood in 1957.

== History ==
=== Construction ===
Joseph A. Britton built this bridge the same year that he built the Phillips Covered Bridge. The location listed is an estimate of where the bridge was actually located. It appears from comparing modern satellite photos to an old Parke County Atlas the location of the bridge may be flooded by a lake now.

=== Destruction ===
In 1957, when this bridge and the Weisner Covered Bridge were both destroyed in the same flood, the idea for a Parke County Covered Bridge Festival was born.

== See also ==
- Parke County Covered Bridges
