= Harrison Covered Bridge =

- Coordinates: 39°51′17.75″N 87°20′8.75″W
- Carries: Tow Path Road
- Crosses: Sugar Creek
- Locale: West Union, Indiana, Parke, Indiana, United States
- Official name: Harrison Covered Bridge
- Named for: William Henry Harrison

Characteristics
- Total length: 250 ft (76 m)

History
- Constructed by: J. J. Daniels
- Built: 1866
- Construction cost: $5,725
- Closed: September 1876

Location
- Interactive map of Harrison Covered Bridge

The Harrison Covered Bridge was north of West Union, Indiana. The double-span Burr Arch covered bridge structure was built by J. J. Daniels in 1866 and damaged by flood waters in December 1875.

== History ==
=== Construction ===
The bridge was built to replace the Star Mill Covered Bridge that had been destroyed by flood waters in 1866. J. J. Daniels was paid $269.66 by the Parke County Commissioners to remove the destroyed bridge from the creek bed.

On July 14, 1866, the County Commissioners awarded Daniels with the contract to replace the bridge for $5,725. The bridge would be completed in 1866 and named the Harrison Bridge in honor of the Indiana Territorial Governor and later President William Henry Harrison. Because of the name change the Star Mills Covered Bridge has sometimes been referred to as the Harrison #1 Bridge.

With no photographs available it is unclear if the Harrison Bridge resembled the Jackson Covered Bridge or the later West Union Covered Bridge. It is known though that an earlier bid for the bridge was $18,000 so it may be that Daniels was able to reuse some of the materials that he had recovered from the earlier bridge, also the same abutments.

=== Repair and destruction ===
The bridge and its abutments were damaged in December 1875, much like the earlier bridge, it seems that span over the creek at this point were too narrow and that the bridge was too low to withstand the flood waters. The West Union Covered Bridge that would later replace it has a 65' wider span and is probably higher to allow more water to pass during the spring thaws and recurring freshets.

Daniels was able to complete what must have been some temporary repairs for $600 because by September 1876 the West Union Covered Bridge was completed. There are references that would seem to indicate that the Harrison Bridge was still in use during construction of the new bridge

== See also ==
- Parke County Covered Bridges
- Parke County Covered Bridge Festival
