= Hargrave Covered Bridge =

Bridge in Portland Mills, Indiana, US

- Coordinates: 39°46′29.02″N 87°2′21.07″W
- Crosses: Big Raccoon Creek
- Locale: Parke, Indiana, United States
- Official name: Hargrave Covered Bridge
- Named for: A. A. Hargrave

History
- Constructed by: J. J. Daniels (unconfirmed)
- Built: 1847

Location
- Interactive map of Hargrave Covered Bridge

The Hargrave Covered Bridge was west of Portland Mills, Indiana. The single-span Burr Arch covered bridge structure was built by J. J. Daniels in 1847 and destroyed by a flood in 1913.

== History ==
The bridge was named after A. A. Hargrave, a Rockville editor who lived to be over 100 years old. Exact record of the bridges construction have been lost. A photo of the bridge before it was destroyed show the construction date of 1847 but the builder's name is too blurry to make out. The portals are of the same style as the Jackson Covered Bridge built by Daniels. The Great Flood of 1913 that also claimed and damaged several other bridges in the county claimed this bridge also. It was later replaced with the Harbison Covered Bridge in 1916.

== See also ==
- Parke County Covered Bridges
- Parke County Covered Bridge Festival
