= Howard Covered Bridge =

Bridge in United States of America

- Coordinates: 39°45′36.06″N 87°10′2.6″W
- Carried: Plank Road
- Crossed: Little Raccoon Creek
- Locale: Parke, Indiana, United States
- Official name: Howard Covered Bridge
- Named for: General Tilghman Ashurst Howard

History
- Constructed by: Britton, J.A.
- Built: 1913
- Destroyed: 1931 or 1932 Torn Down

Location
- Interactive map of Howard Covered Bridge

The Howard Covered Bridge was east of Rockville, Indiana. The single-span Burr Arch covered bridge structure was built by J. A. Britton in 1913 and torn down in 1931 or 1932 during the expansion of U.S. Route 36 (US 36).

== History ==
This bridge replaced the previous Plank Road Covered Bridge. The original bridge was built when the Plank Road between Indianapolis and Montezuma was put in. The planks soon rotted however and the Parke County Commissioners purchased the road, graveled it, and made it a free road. The new bridge was put in when the old bridge was destroyed during the Great Flood of 1913. Britton was able to retain the unique look of the squared off opening and rounded false front that hid the normal peak roof that resembled the earlier Plank Road Covered Bridge, unlike his normal "Britton Portal."

The road that used the bridge would go through would go through a couple of name change over the years. In 1918 the state of Indiana went through and numbered certain roads as state roads. Then when the U.S. Highway System came into Indiana in 1926, some of the state roads went through another number change. That meant that in 1918 the Plank Road was changed to Indiana State Road 31 (SR 31). When the U.S. Highways were designated in the area, "31" was already in use on the north–south U.S. Route 31 (US 31). So, old SR 31 became new US 36. With the new road though came a straightening out of the old road and with this the bridge was bypassed with the new road going to the north of the bridge.

== See also ==
- Parke County Covered Bridges
- Parke County Covered Bridge Festival
