= Dooley Station Covered Bridge =

- Coordinates: 39°51′38.67″N 87°5′19.66″W
- Carries: C.R. E650N
- Crosses: Little Raccoon Creek
- Locale: Parke, Indiana, United States
- Official name: Dooley Station Covered Bridge
- Named for: The Dooley Family
- WGCB Number: 14-61-22

Characteristics
- Total length: 95 ft (29 m)73ft +11ft overhangs on each end
- Width: 16 ft (4.9 m)

History
- Constructed by: W.C. Carty
- Built: 1917

Location
- Interactive map of Dooley Station Covered Bridge

The Dooley Station Covered Bridge was east of Dooley Station, Indiana. The Burr arch truss style single span covered bridge crossed Little Raccoon Creek and was built by W.C. Carty in 1917 and destroyed by arson in 1960.

== History ==
=== Destruction ===
On December 4, 1960, around 9:30 at night, Sam Link and Joe Long discovered the Dooley Station Covered Bridge on fire. They also noted a car fleeing the area with its lights turned off. Running to the home of Mr. and Mrs. Albert Dooley they phoned the Waveland and Bellmore fire departments and the Parke County Sheriff. The same night as the fire it was reported that heavy equipment, parked nearby being used in the construction of its replacement, was moved onto the Thorpe Ford Covered Bridge in an attempt to overload it.

Six young men, David Bousman, 17, Rockville; James Wheatfill, 21, Judson; Donald Fisher, 17, R.R.3, Rockville; Lance Peffley, 19, R.R.4, Rockville; Daniel Furr, 20, Rockville; and Billy Norton, 18, Judson, were eventually arrested and held in the Parke County Jail for suspicion of starting the fire. The next Tuesday they were arraigned before Judge Clarence J. Powel who continued the case until Saturday December 17 setting bond at $2,000. The suspects reported that they drove to the bridge and sprinkled kerosene on it before setting it on fire. They gave no reason for setting the fire. Peffley, Bousman, and Wheatfill were ordered to pay $25/week for 50 weeks to the Parke County clerk, Norton had to pay $25/week for 46 weeks, and Furr and Fisher had to pay $25/week for 42 weeks. They were also all sentenced to 12 months in jail, but the judge suspended the sentences down to two-day weekend terms, Friday 6pm to Sunday 6pm which was 104 days in jail and an 8pm curfew every evening. They were permitted to drive their cars only to and from work and were forbidden to drink intoxicating beverages. The Parke County commissioners also consented to give any of the young men jobs with the Parke County Highway Department at $1.35/hour to help pay their fines. Bousman, Wheatfill, and Fisher took the county highway jobs.

=== Replacement ===
In January 1961 the Portland Mills Covered Bridge was moved to the Dooley Station Covered Bridge's location to replace it. The Portland Mills Covered Bridge needed moved because the location it was at was going to be flooded with the creation of Lake Mansfield.

== See also ==
- Parke County Covered Bridges
- Parke County Covered Bridge Festival
