= West Union Covered Bridge (Indiana) =

Place in Indiana listed on National Register of Historic Places

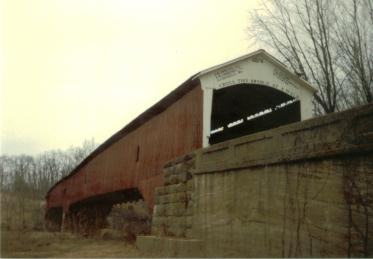
- West Union Covered Bridge
- Coordinates: 39°51′17.75″N 87°20′8.75″W
- Carries: Tow Path Road (C.R. 525W)
- Crosses: Sugar Creek, Parke County, Indiana
- Locale: Parke County, Indiana, United States
- Official name: West Union Covered Bridge
- Named for: West Union, Indiana
- Maintained by: Parke County
- WGCB Number: 1. 14-61-27

Characteristics
- Design: National Register of Historic Places
- Total length: 337 ft (103 m)310ft +10ft +17ft overhangs on each end
- Width: 17 ft (5.2 m)
- Height: 14.5 ft (4.4 m)

History
- Constructed by: J. J. Daniels
- Built: 1876
- West Union Covered Bridge
- U.S. National Register of Historic Places
- U.S. National Historic Landmark
- MPS: Parke County Covered Bridges TR
- NRHP reference No.: 78000414, 100000869

Significant dates
- Added to NRHP: December 22, 1978
- Designated NHL: December 23, 2016

Location
- Interactive map of West Union Covered Bridge

The West Union Covered Bridge formerly carried Tow Path Road over Sugar Creek north-northeast of Montezuma, Indiana. The two-span Burr Arch Truss covered bridge structure was built by Joseph J. Daniels in 1876. It is notable for being the longest standing covered bridge in Parke County, and one of the nation's best-preserved examples of the Burr truss.

It was added to the National Register of Historic Places in 1978 and was named a National Historic Landmark in 2016.

== History ==
The West Union Covered Bridge is the third bridge to stand at this location. The Star Mill Covered Bridge was the first and then the Harrison Covered Bridge replaced it but was damaged in 1876 prompting the West Union Covered Bridge to be built. The bridge was finished in September 1876. The road was originally part of the "Indiana State Highway", established with Legislature in 1827, which connected Fort Wayne with Terre Haute. Along with the Armiesburg Covered Bridge it hosted stage coach traffic to Lafayette.

Not much is left of West Union today, only a handful of houses. Gone are the school, post office, and the railroad. The Wabash Erie Canal ran just west of town with a feeder canal running south of Sugar Creek and connecting to the west of the bridge. The Chicago & Eastern Illinois Railroad crossed Sugar Creek to the east of the bridge and past West Union on the west side. Little is left of evidence of the railroad or the canal today. Farmers reclaimed the land and farm most of it today.

== Gallery ==
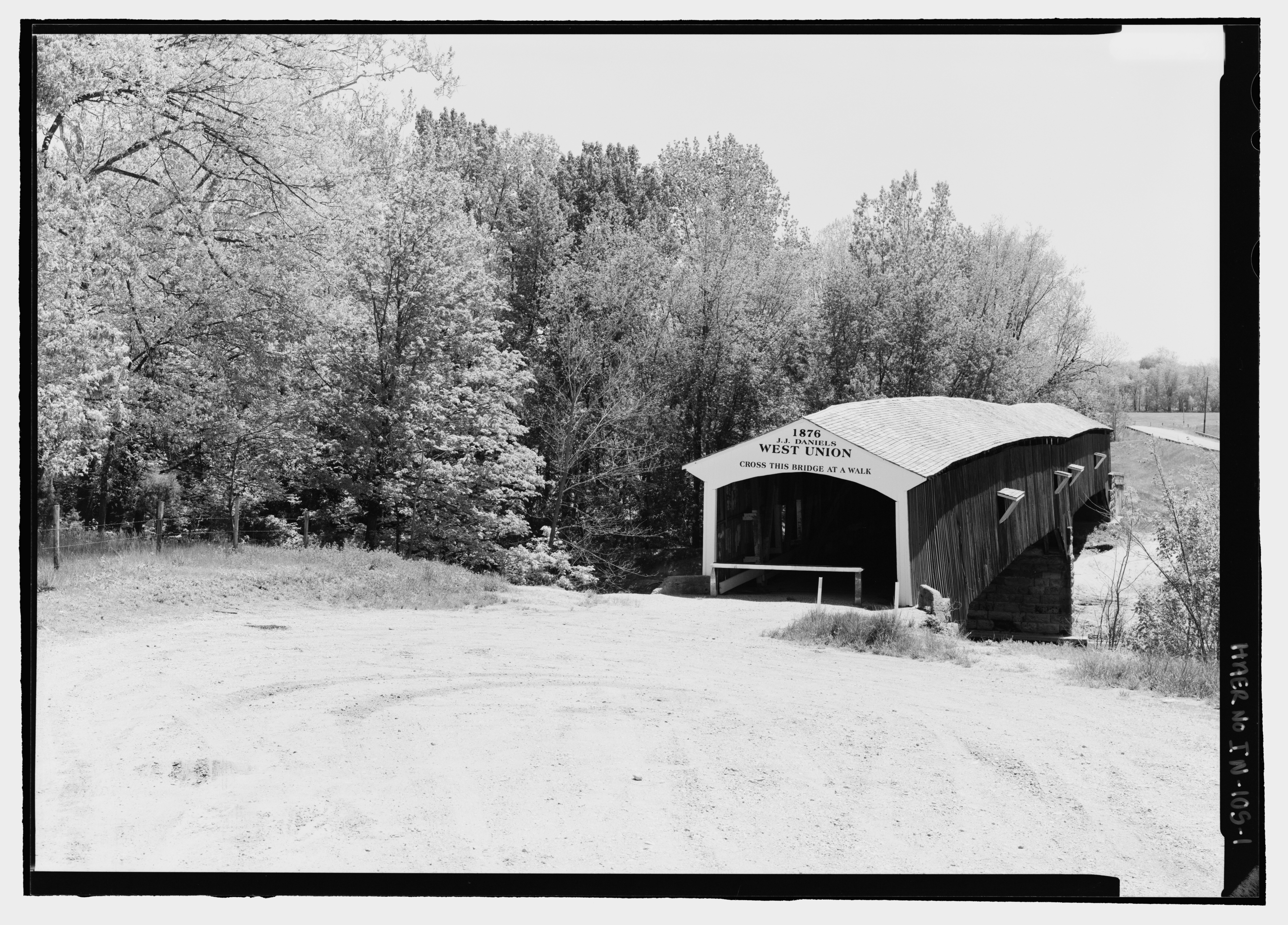
View of Northwest portal.

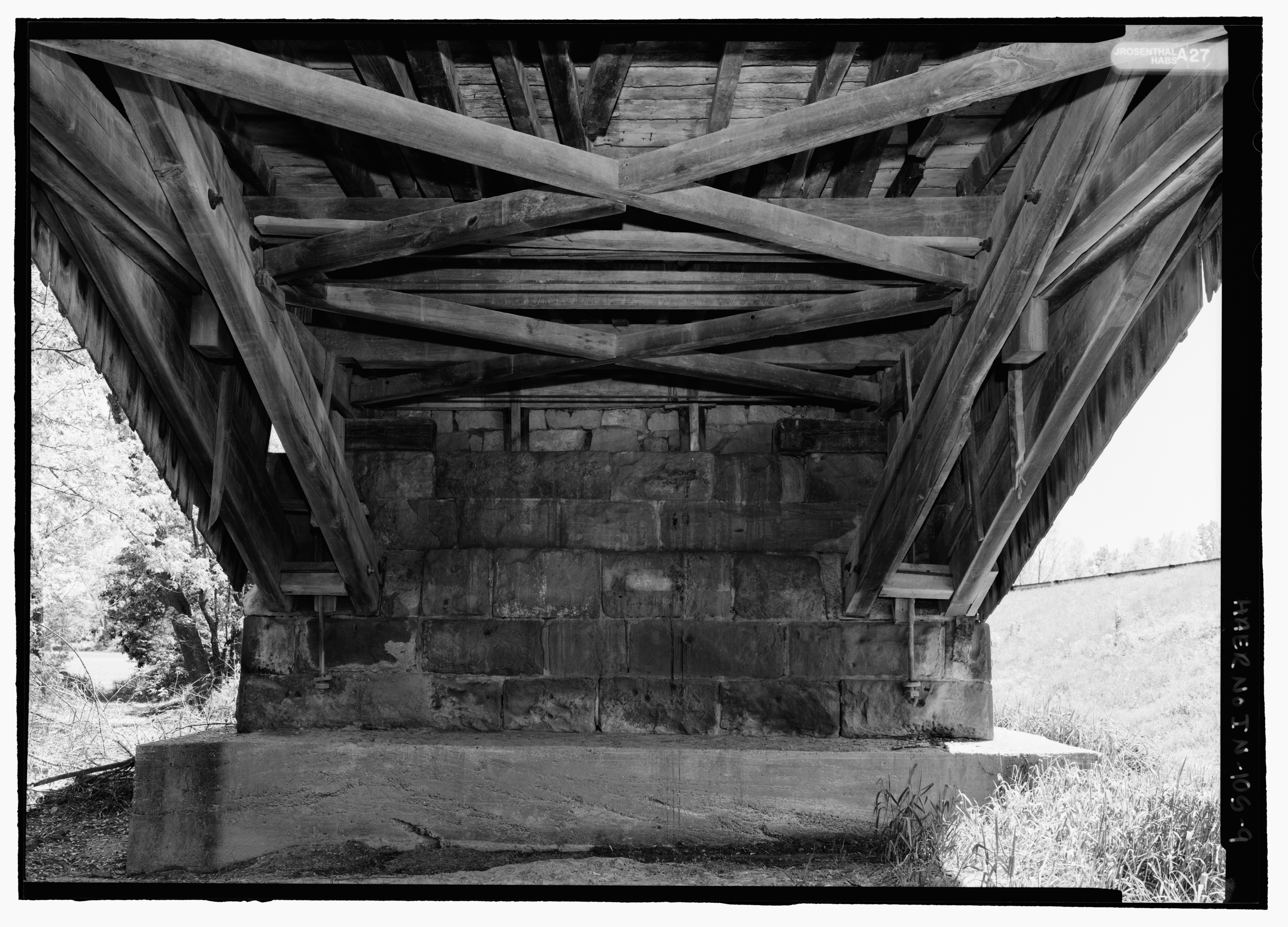
Detail of Southeast abutment with view of double Burr Arch rings bearing on abutment and lower truss details.

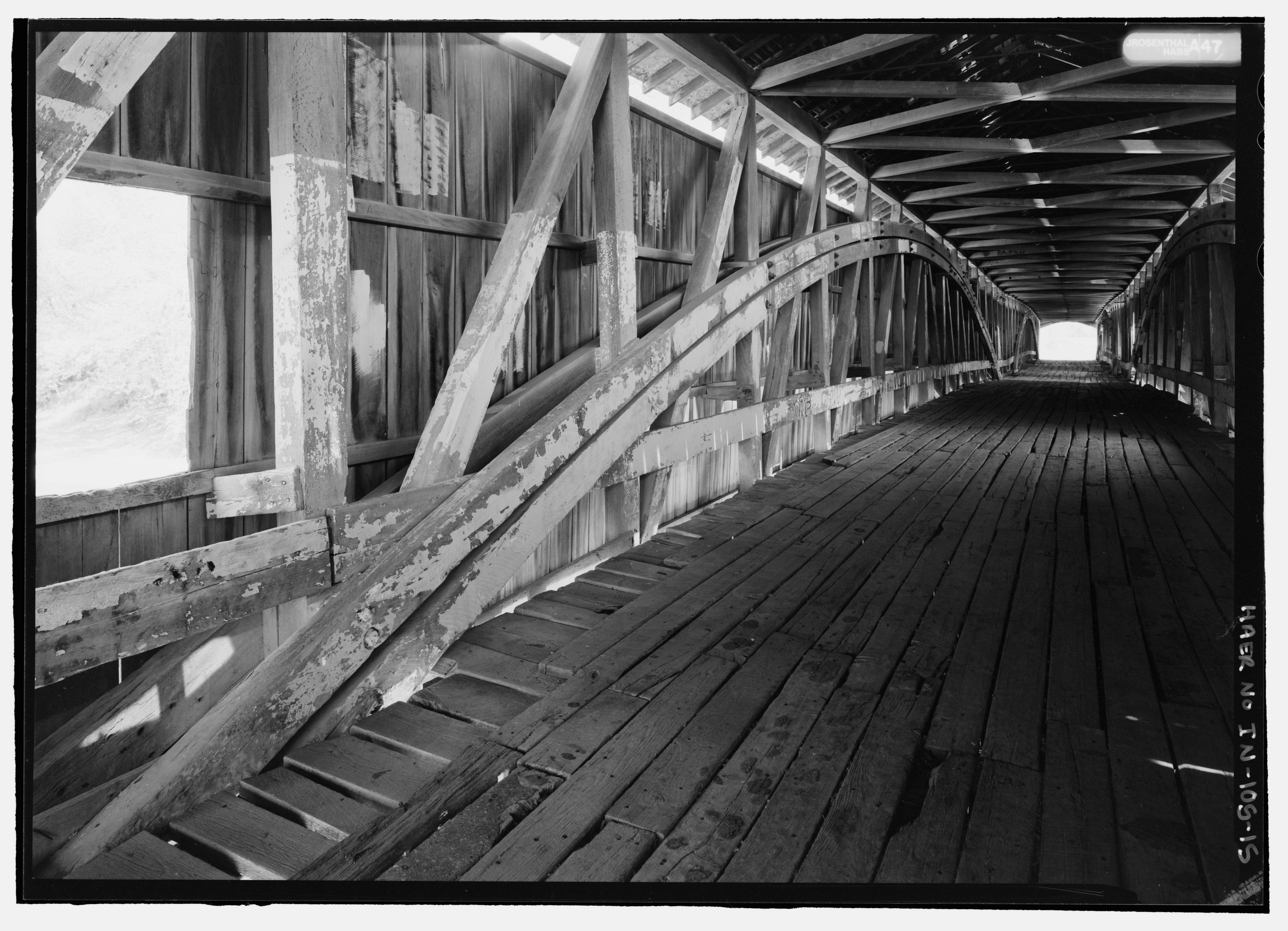
Interior view of double Burr Arches, Kings Posts, and upper truss.

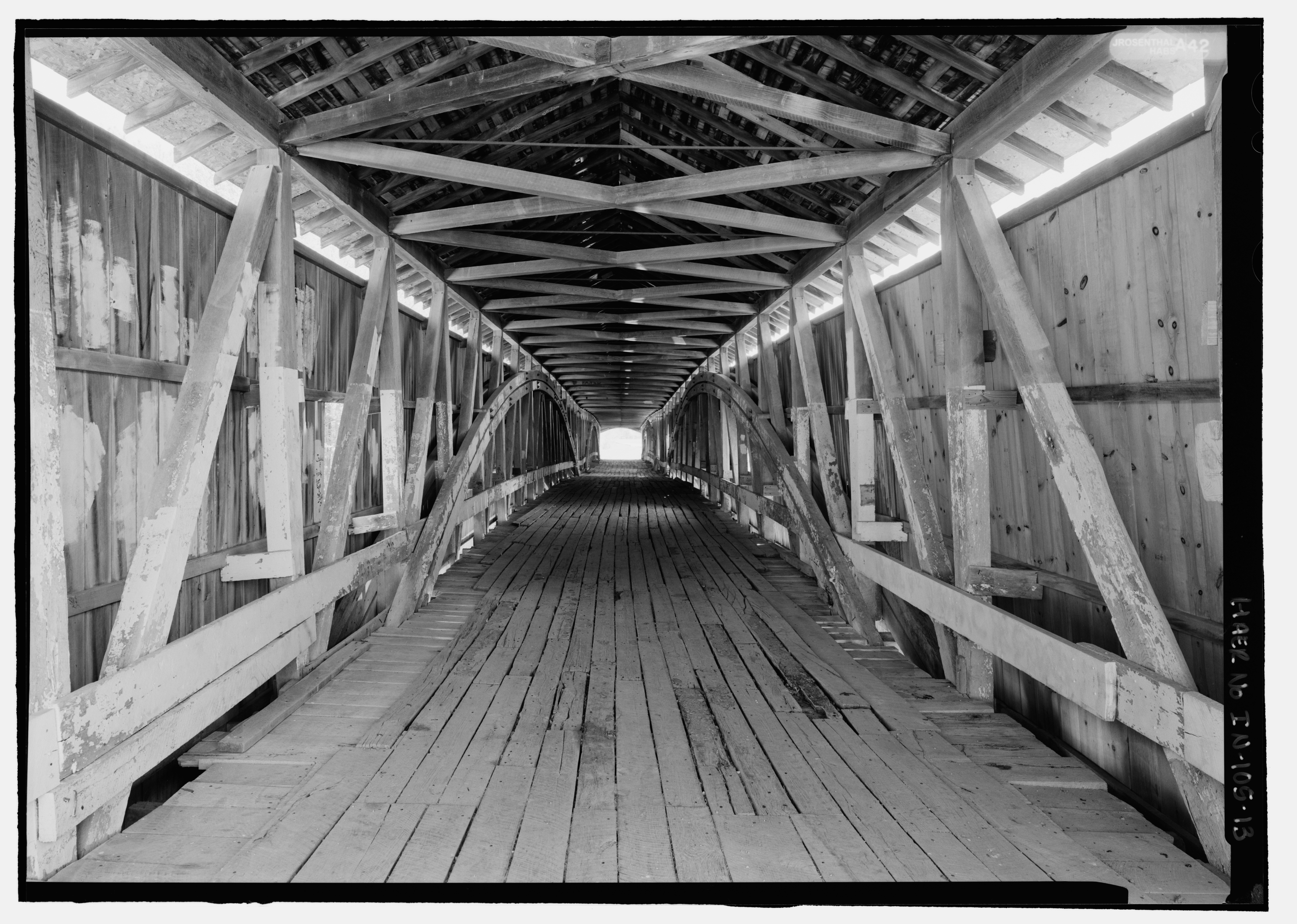
View looking Southeast of interior of bridge.

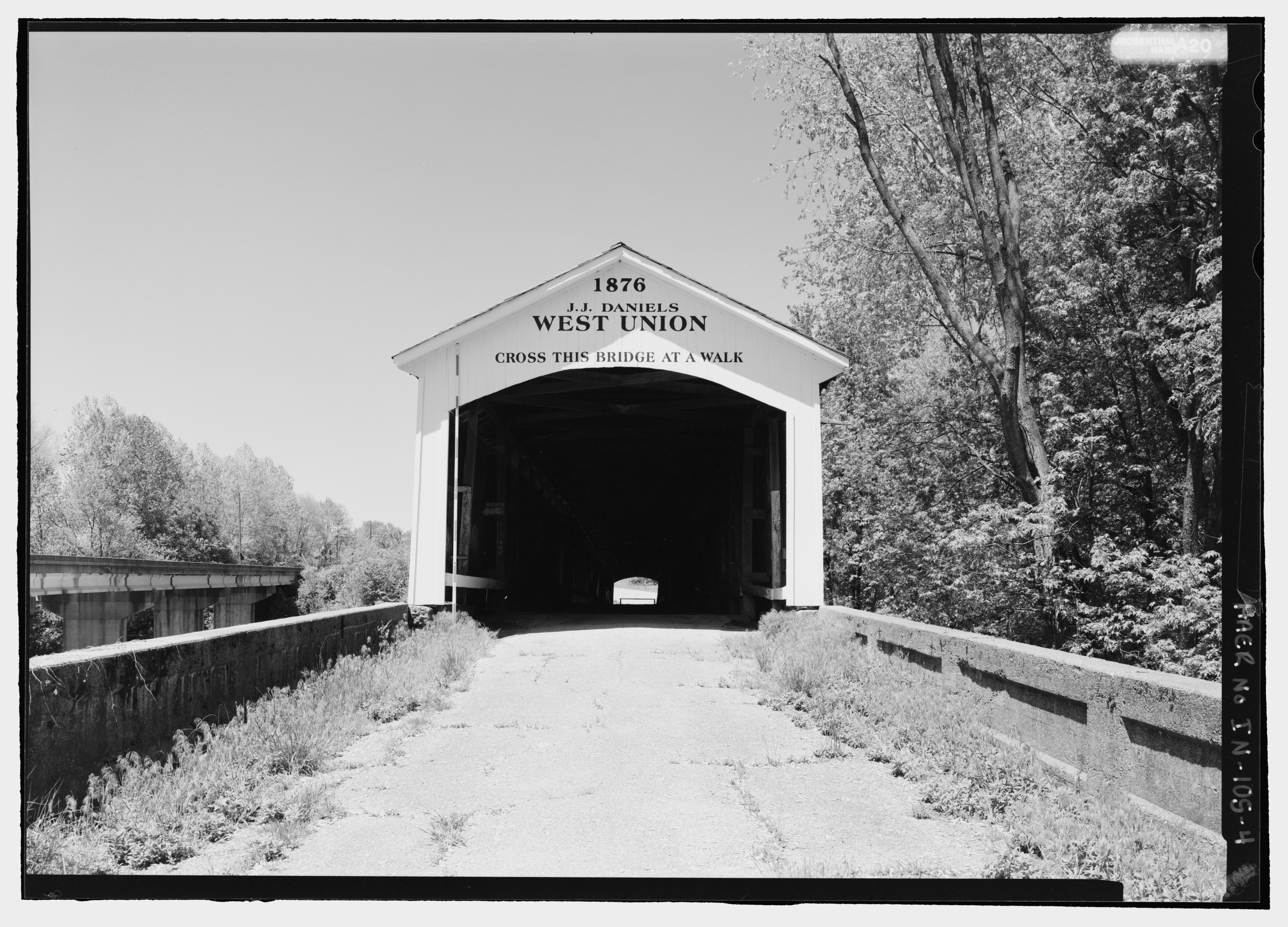
View of Southeast portal. (Note new bridge to far left)

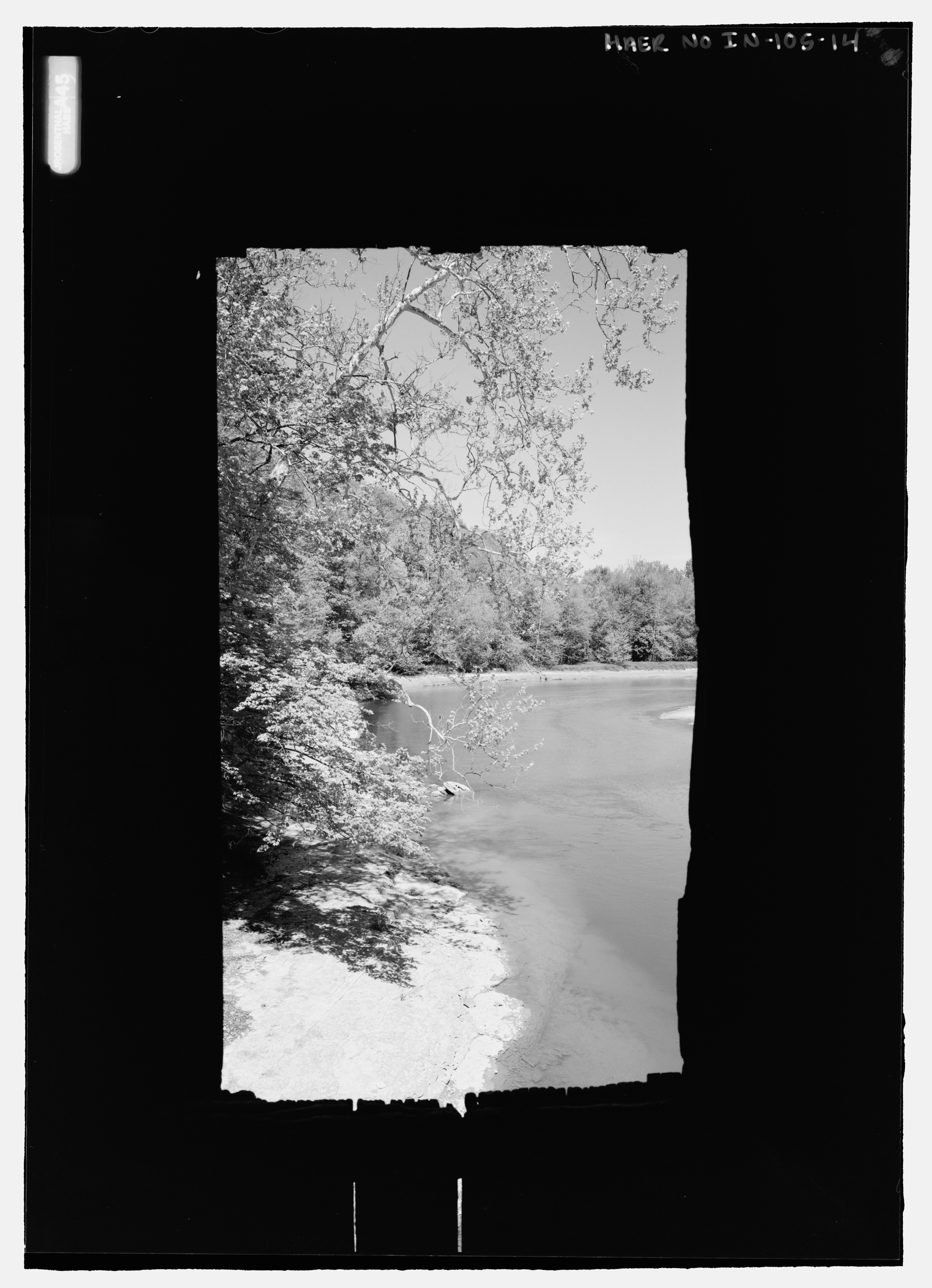
View out of east window looking east.

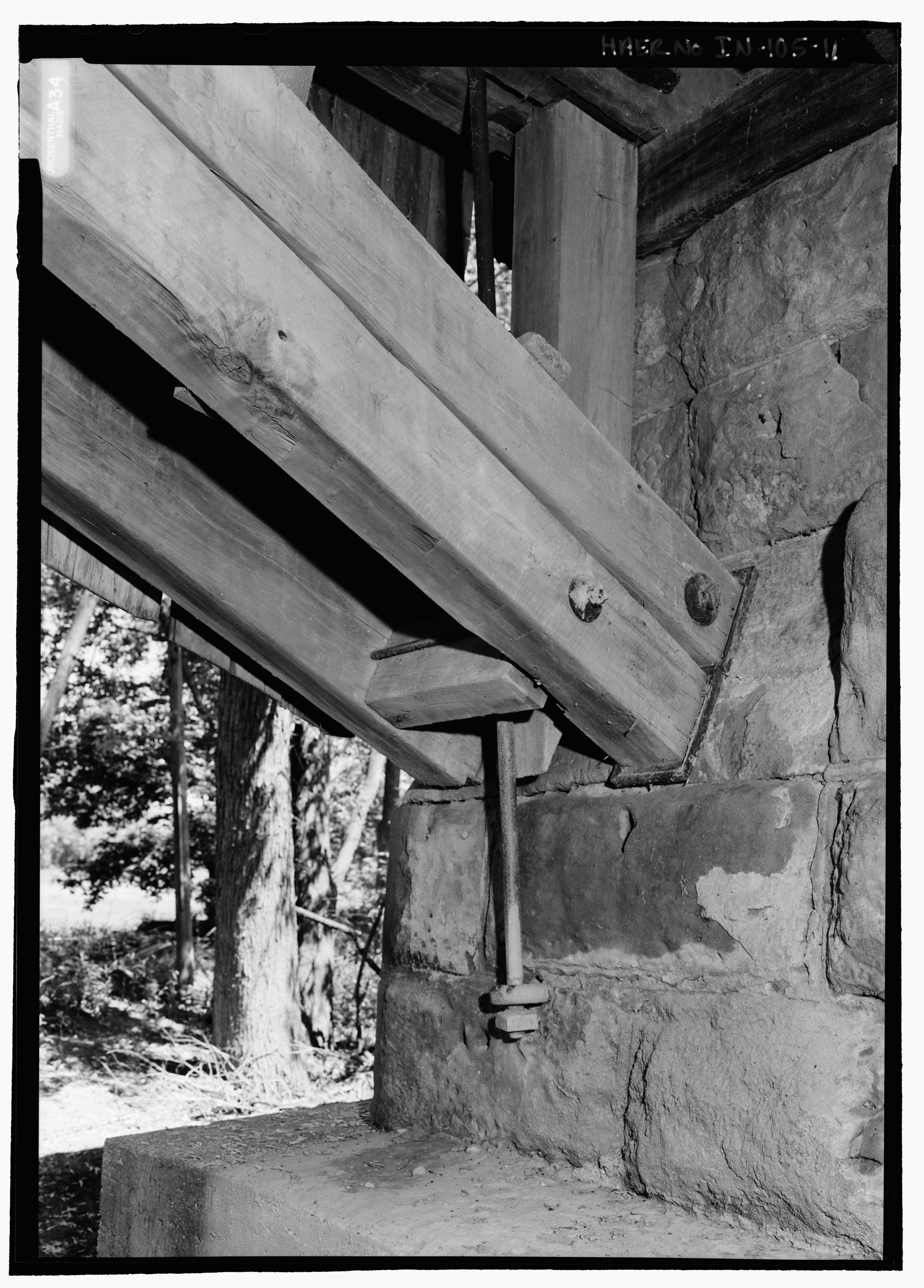
Detail of Southeast of abutment.

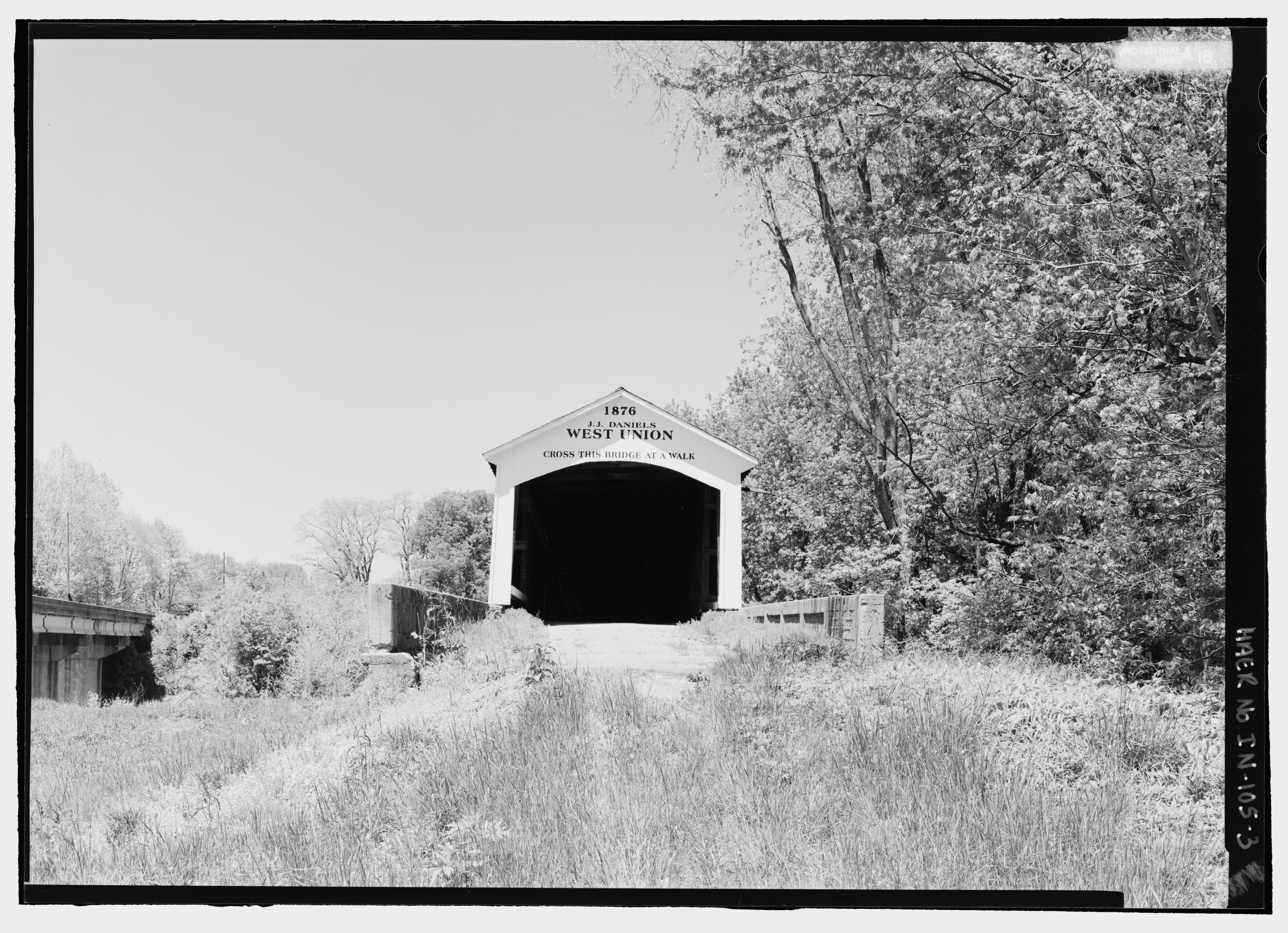
View of Southeast portal.

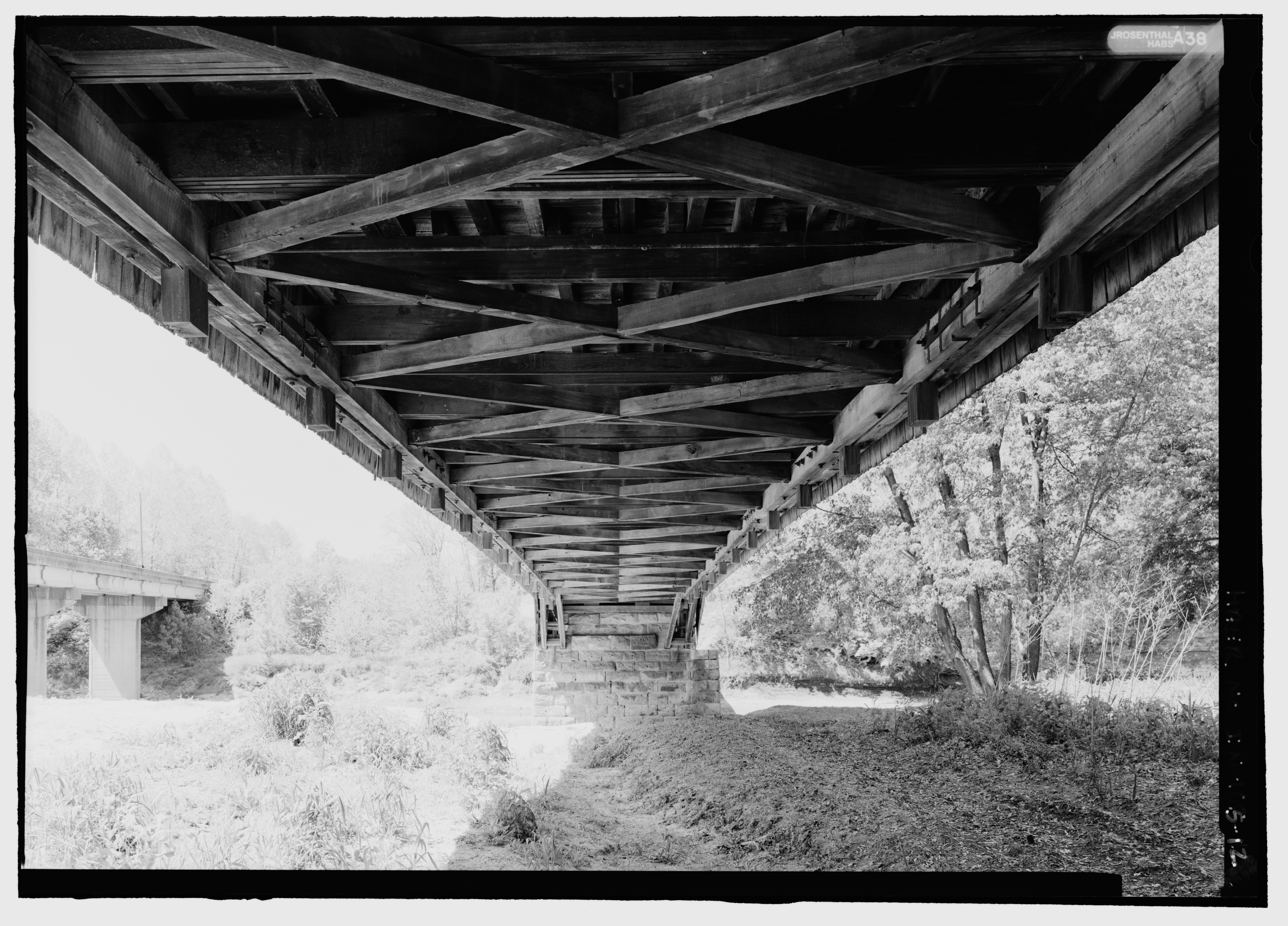
View of center abutment from Southeast abutment.

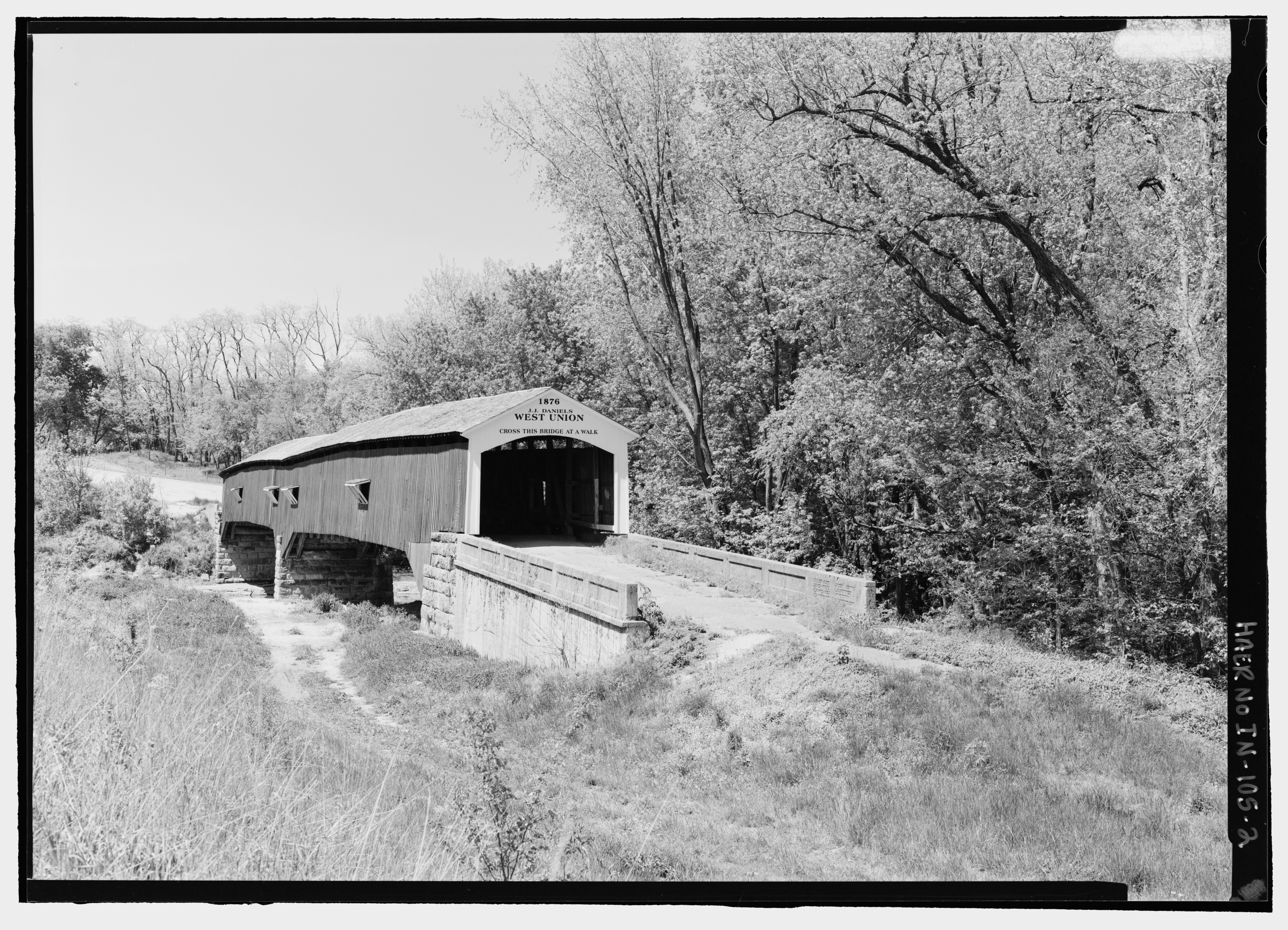
View of Southwest side of bridge from South.

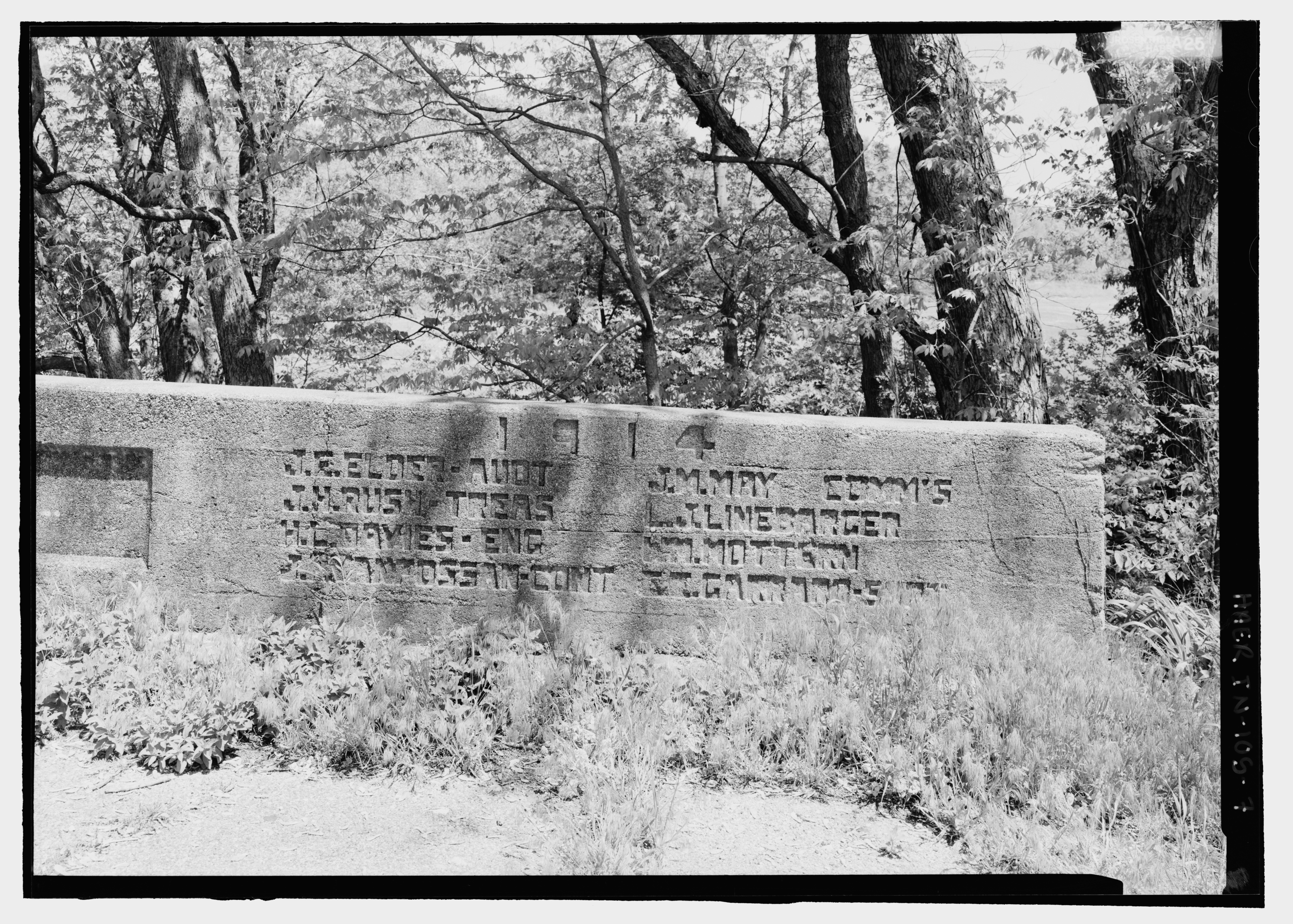
Detail of wall inscription showing 1914 date and names of county officials at time of building.

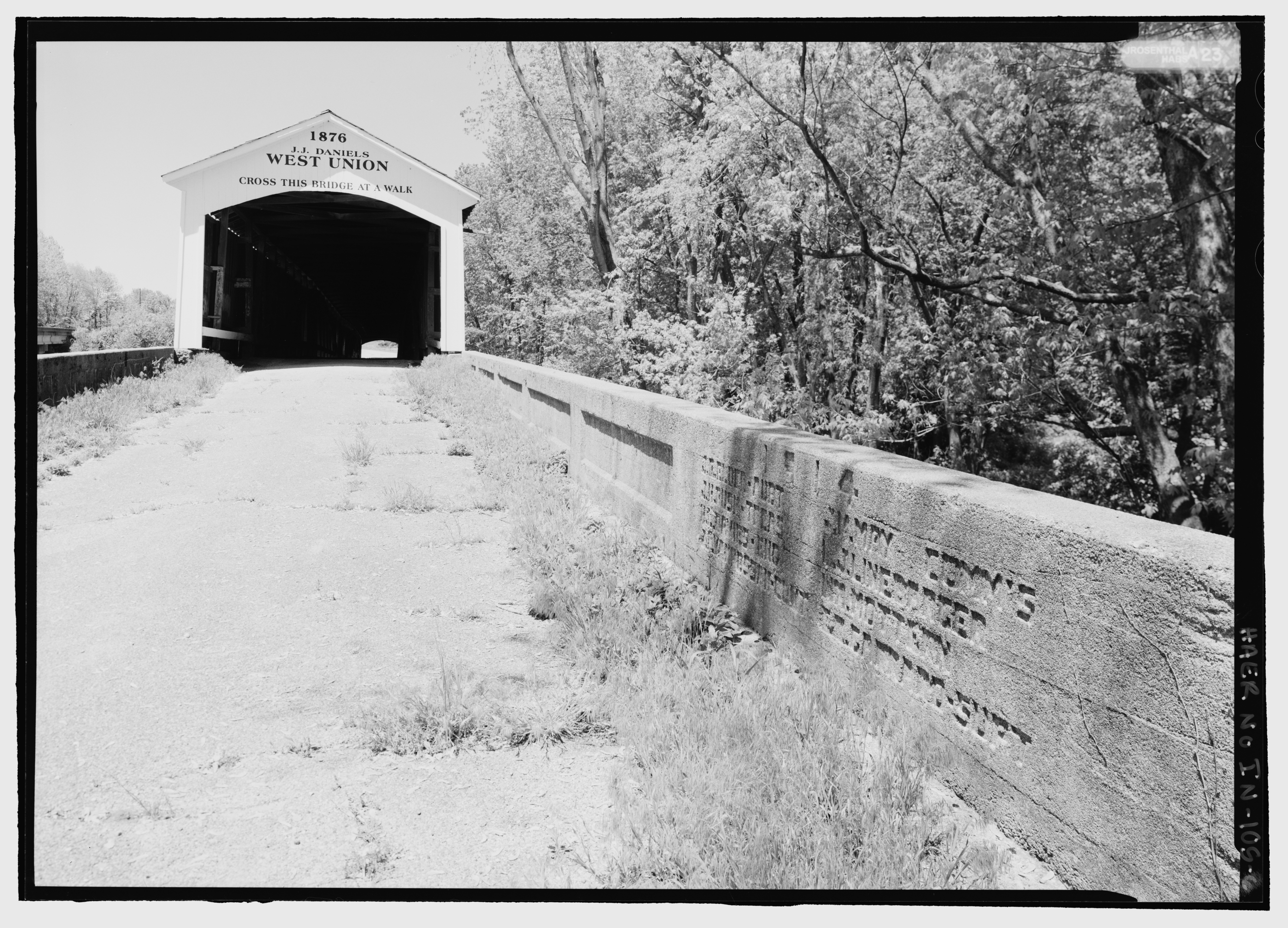
View of wall, built in 1914 after flood damaged original walls, and Southeast portal.

== See also ==
- List of bridges documented by the Historic American Engineering Record in Indiana
- National Register of Historic Places listings in Parke County, Indiana
- List of National Historic Landmarks in Indiana
- Parke County Covered Bridges
- Parke County Covered Bridge Festival
