= Phillips Covered Bridge =

Place in Indiana listed on National Register of Historic Places

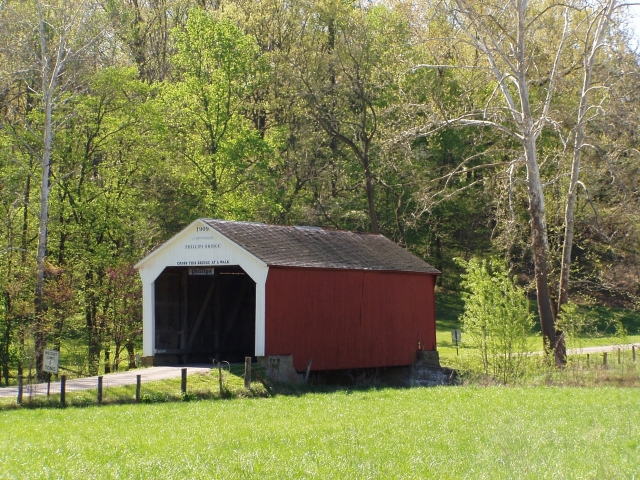
- Coordinates: 39°46′20.17″N 87°19′20.71″W
- Crosses: Rocky Run
- Locale: Wabash Township, Parke County, Indiana
- Other name: Arabia Bridge
- Named for: The Phillips family
- Owner: Parke County
- ID number: 6100057

Characteristics
- Design: Multiple King Posts (no arch) single span
- Material: Wood
- Total length: 43 ft (13 m)
- Width: 16 ft (4.9 m)
- Clearance above: 14 ft (4.3 m)

History
- Constructed by: Britton, J.A.
- Opened: 1909
- Rebuilt: 1991
- Phillips Covered Bridge
- U.S. National Register of Historic Places
- MPS: Parke County Covered Bridges TR
- NRHP reference No.: 78000407
- Added to NRHP: Dec 22, 1978

Location
- Interactive map of Phillips Covered Bridge

The Phillips Covered Bridge is southeast of Montezuma, Indiana in Parke County, Indiana and crosses Rocky Run, also known as Big Pond Creek. Unlike the rest of the bridges of Parke County, it is a single span King Post bridge structure, having no arches, that was built by Joseph A. Britton in 1909.

It was added to the National Register of Historic Places in 1978.

== History ==
The Phillips Covered Bridge is often known as the Arabia Covered Bridge because the surrounding area was known as "Little Arabia." This name may of came from the Syrian Muslims immigrants that had settled nearby or maybe as a term of derision for the residents of the area who were thought of as little more than cattle thieves. The Arabia Church had been built on the hill south of the covered bridge. The only remains of the church now though are a step, foundation and some broken stained glass. However, the church's cemetery, Arabia Cemetery, remains and many of the headstones are inscribed with the "Phillips" name showing that the Phillips family had been prominent to the area near the bridge. The 1908 Parke County Atlas shows that the Phillips owned all the land west and south of the bridge.

The bridge also holds the distinction of not only being the shortest covered bridge in Parke County but also the only bridge left that is not of Burr Arch construction, it is a four-segment Kings Post truss bridge. It took these honors in 1957 when its sister bridge, the Weisner Covered Bridge, was washed out. The Weisner Covered Bridge had been built the year before the Phillips Covered Bridge by J.A. Britton also using a four-segment Kings Post truss but was shorter than the Phillips Bridge.

== Gallery ==
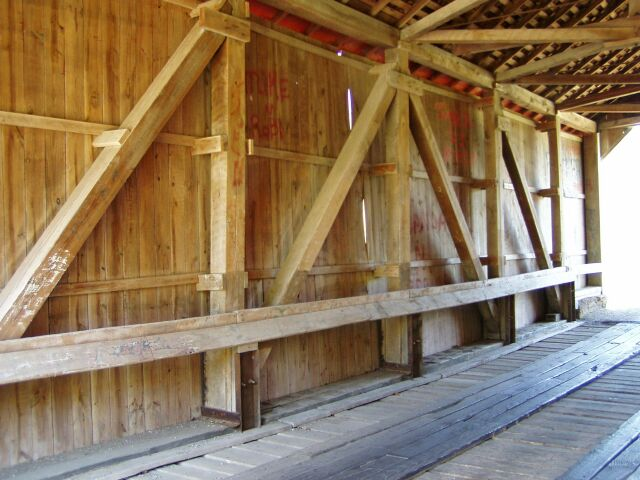
View of the King Post construction with addition bracing added to lengthen the span

== See also ==
- List of Registered Historic Places in Indiana
- Parke County Covered Bridges
- Parke County Covered Bridge Festival
