= Roaring Creek Covered Bridge =

- Coordinates: 39°52′16.43″N 87°13′59.56″W
- Crossed: Roaring Creek
- Locale: Parke, Indiana, United States
- Official name: Roaring Creek Covered Bridge
- Named for: Roaring Creek

Characteristics
- Total length: 40–60 ft (12–18 m)

History
- Constructed by: Henry Wolf, Indiana (Unconfirmed)
- Built: 1863 (Unconfirmed)
- Destroyed: Between 1923 and 1925 Dismantled

The Roaring Creek Covered Bridge was northeast of Annapolis, Indiana. The single-span covered bridge structure was built by Henry Wolf in 1863 and dismantled in 1923–25.

== History ==
=== Construction ===
Very little recorded history remains for this bridge. According to an early account, though, the bridge may have been the second bridge at this location, the first being of an open design. According to legend, in 1863, a group of young people set out from Bloomingdale in a wagon to visit Turkey Run. While crossing the bridge it collapsed and sent the horses, wagon, and the young people into the water, which because of the nearby mill dam, was around six to seven feet deep. The horse team was unable to be saved but all of the passengers were. However, the truth of this story is unknown because records of the earlier open bridge and its covered bridge replacement have not been found in the Parke County Commissioners' records. Even information on the mill is very limited. There is a photograph of a bicyclist at the Roaring Creek Covered Bridge, from 1912, showing the bridge had squared off portals in the style of Henry Wolf, indicating that he could have been the builder. The bridge also appears to be around 40 to 60 feet in length.

=== Destruction ===
The bridge was dismantled and removed sometime between 1923 and 1925 when the new US 41 was constructed. The mill dam is even still visible from the US 41 bridge.

== See also ==
- Parke County Covered Bridges
- Parke County Covered Bridge Festival
