= Red Covered Bridge (Rosedale, Indiana) =

Bridge in United States of America

- Coordinates: 39°37′34.38″N 87°15′1.15″W
- Carried: C.R. 75W
- Crossed: Big Raccoon Creek
- Locale: Parke, Indiana, United States
- Official name: Red Covered Bridge
- Other name(s): Newcombs Ford and Gallatin Mill
- Named for: The color of the bridge
- WGCB Number: 14-61-08

Characteristics
- Total length: 276 ft (84 m)248ft +14ft overhangs on each end
- Width: 16 ft (4.9 m)
- Height: 13 ft (4.0 m)

History
- Constructed by: J. J. Daniels
- Built: 1880
- Destroyed: October 13, 1976 Arson

The Red Covered Bridge was east of Rosedale, Indiana. The double-span Burr Arch covered bridge structure was built by J. J. Daniels in 1880 and destroyed by arson on October 13, 1976.

== History ==
=== Construction ===
On March 10, 1880, the Parke County Commissioners advertised that they would be taking bids for a bridge to be built at Newcombs Ford in Florida Township. On May 14, 1880, the bids that had been turned in were opened. Richard Epperson had placed a bid for $8,700 and J. J. Daniels had placed two bids with different plans, plan #1 was for $7,600 and plan #2 was for $7,300. Daniels plan #1 won the contract. The Final inspection was completed on October 13, 1880.

=== Name ===
Early on, most covered bridges weren't painted, and when they were, they were usually painted white. This bridge was painted red and also had its ends painted red, most bridges had their ends painted white for improved visibility. Another benefit to painting the bridges may have been that it aided in the horses not being leery of entering them, thinking that the bridge was only a long barn rather than a bridge crossing over running water.

=== Destruction ===
Shortly after the bridge was damaged by arson in 1969, William Hargrave, former publisher of the Rockville Republican, established a fund, the Covered Bridge Arson Reward Fund, in an effort to discourage arsonists.

However, seven years later, on October 13, 1976, 96 years to the day that it passed its final inspection, the Red Bridge was burnt down by arson. Three people were charged with second degree arson and conspiracy to commit a felony. All three were soon arrested separately. One was apprehended by an Indiana State Police detective at a service station. Another was arrested at home by Parke County deputies. The last was picked up by West Terre Haute police near another service station. On October 15, 1976, they were arraigned before Judge Dowd with their cases being continued to October 29. Over the objections of the prosecutors the defense attorneys asked for and were granted continuances to study the charges and detailed information. They were later released on $50,000 bail each and the venue was moved to Vermillion County with Judge Peter J. Marietta presiding.

Torch Newspapers would start a campaign to collect funds to rebuild the bridge but as of 2015 the Red Bridge has not been rebuilt or replaced. The stones in the three abutments may have been used on the new Bridgeton Covered Bridge and the road is closed.

== See also ==
- Parke County Covered Bridges
- Parke County Covered Bridge Festival
