= Weisner Covered Bridge =

Bridge in United States of America

- Coordinates: 39°41′11.88″N 87°15′54.95″W
- Crossed: Weisner Creek
- Locale: Parke, Indiana, United States of America
- Official name: Weisner Covered Bridge
- Named for: Weisner Creek

Characteristics
- Total length: 63 ft (19 m)43ft +10ft overhangs on each end
- Width: 16 ft (4.9 m)

History
- Constructed by: Britton, J.A.
- Built: 1908
- Destroyed: 1957 Flood

The Weisner Covered Bridge was southwest of Catlin, Indiana. The single-span King Post covered bridge structure was built by Joseph A. Britton in 1908 and destroyed by flood in 1957.

== History ==
=== Construction ===
Joseph A. Britton built this bridge the same year that he also built the nearby Zacke Cox Covered Bridge and Harry Evans Covered Bridges. It would hold the title as the shortest covered bridge in Parke County until a year later when the Phillips Covered Bridge would tie it for the title.

During construction, teams of horses and wagons would bog down in quicksand that lay along the creek bed. To fix this, small herds of cattle were led back and forth across these areas to pack the sand down and make it firm enough to support the horses and wagons.

=== Destruction ===
On June 27 and 28, 1957, the remnants of Hurricane Audrey met up with a front that laid across central Indiana. The resulting rain, 6 to 10 inches, produces record floods across central Indiana and east-central Illinois. Rockville reported 10.15 inches. Big Raccoon Creek report the highest levels since the floods of 1875. Across the area six people were drowned, 1,282 dwellings damaged, 125 businesses were flooded, dozens of highway and railroad bridges were washed out and a million acres of crops were flooded, with thousands of acres of already cultivated land flooded to a depth of 6 feet or more.

The Weisner Covered Bridge was washed away when a small dam above the bridge gave way in this massive rainstorm. This quickly filled the Weisner Creek valley with flood water, washing the bridge away and threatening the residents of a nearby house that feared the flood waters would sweep it away also.

Since then a larger flood control dam, constructed by the Corps of Engineers, has been constructed upstream from the former site of the Weisner Covered Bridge. However, a study of the new dam reports that if it were to fail and collapse the resulting flood waters would sweep down the Little Raccoon Creek valley and damage houses in Jessup.

With this bridge and the Moore Covered Bridge both destroyed in the same flood and an economic downturn in the county, the idea for the Parke County Covered Bridge Festival was born as a way to increase county income and preserve the county's unique covered bridges.

== See also ==
- Parke County Covered Bridges
