= Red Covered Bridge =

Red Covered Bridge may refer to:

- Red Covered Bridge (Princeton, Illinois), listed on the National Register of Historic Places in Bureau County, Illinois
- Red Covered Bridge (Rosedale, Indiana)
- Red Covered Bridge (Liverpool, Pennsylvania), listed on the National Register of Historic Places in Perry County, Pennsylvania
- Red Covered Bridge (Morristown, Vermont), listed on the National Register of Historic Places in Lamoille County, Vermont
