= Plank Road Covered Bridge =

- Coordinates: 39°45′36.06″N 87°10′2.6″W
- Carried: Plank Road
- Crossed: Little Raccoon Creek
- Locale: Parke, Indiana, United States
- Official name: Plank Road Covered Bridge
- Named for: The Plank Road

History
- Constructed by: Wolf, Henry, Indiana
- Built: 1854 or 1859
- Destroyed: 1913 Flood

The Plank Road Covered Bridge was east of Rockville, Indiana. The single-span Burr Arch covered bridge structure was built by Henry Wolf in either 1854 or 1859 and destroyed in the Great Flood of 1913.

== History ==
=== Construction ===
The bridge was originally built by Henry Wolf on the Plank Road, that had been constructed between Rockville and Bellmore around 1850. The Plank Road was a toll road that would stretch from Indianapolis, in the east, to the Wabash River, in the west. However, the planking didn't hold up and they soon started to rot. The boards were removed and the road was graveled. In 1867 or 1877 the Parke County Commissioners bought the companies stock and opened the road as a free road.

=== Repairs and Destruction ===
The bridge would suffer from damaging flood a couple of times in its life before finally succumbing to the Great Flood of 1913, which would go on to claim several bridges in Parke County.

The first record is that J.J. Daniels had to make repairs in 1863 to the bridge. Again, in 1875, flood waters damaged the east abutment this time which would require $900 in repairs.

After being damaged in the 1913 flood it was replaced with the Howard Covered Bridge.

== See also ==
- Parke County Covered Bridges
- Parke County Covered Bridge Festival
