= Ferndale, Indiana =

Unincorporated community in Indiana, United States

Ferndale
- Unincorporated community
- Parke County's location in Indiana

- Location in Parke County
- Coordinates: 39°42′26″N 87°04′01″W
- Country: United States
- State: Indiana
- County: Parke
- Township: Union
- Elevation: 617 ft (188 m)
- Time zone: UTC-5 (Eastern (EST))
  - Summer (DST): UTC-4 (EDT)
- ZIP code: 47872
- Area code: 765
- GNIS feature ID: 434459

Ferndale is an unincorporated community in Union Township, Parke County, in the U.S. state of Indiana.

== History ==
A post office was established at Ferndale in 1884, and remained in operation until it was discontinued in 1904. The community was so named on account of the ferns near the original town site.

== Geography ==
Ferndale is located at 39°42′26″N 87°04′01″W at an elevation of 617 feet.
