= Knute Cauldwell =

American football player (1896–1952)

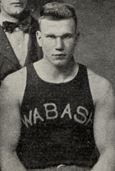
- Cauldwell with the Wabash basketball team

No. 18
- Position: Tackle

Personal information
- Born: July 14, 1896; Bellmore, Indiana, U.S.
- Died: October 30, 1952 (aged 56); California, U.S.
- Listed height: 6 ft 1 in (1.85 m)
- Listed weight: 210 lb (95 kg)

Career information
- College: Wabash (1913–1916)

Career history
- Akron Pros/Indians (1925–1926); Canton Bulldogs (1929)*
- * Offseason or practice squad member only
- Stats at Pro Football Reference

Harold Paul "Knute" Cauldwell (July 14, 1896 – October 30, 1952), sometimes misspelled as Caldwell, was an American professional football tackle who played two seasons with the Akron Pros/Indians of the National Football League (NFL). He played college football at Wabash College.

== Early life and college ==
Harold Paul Cauldwell was born on July 14, 1896, in Bellmore, Indiana. He was a four-year letterman for the Wabash Little Giants of Wabash College from 1913 to 1916. He also played basketball for the Little Giants.

== Professional career ==
Cauldwell played in five games, all starts, for the Akron Pros of the National Football League (NFL) in 1925 as a 29-year-old rookie and made five extra points. He appeared in seven games, all starts, for the newly renamed Akron Indians in 1926. He wore jersey number 18 while with Akron. Cauldwell stood 6'1" and weighed 210 pounds.

Cauldwell later signed with the independent Canton Bulldogs in 1929 but did not appear in any games that year.

== Personal life ==
Cauldwell served in the United States Army. He died on October 30, 1952, in California.
