= Clinton Covered Bridge =

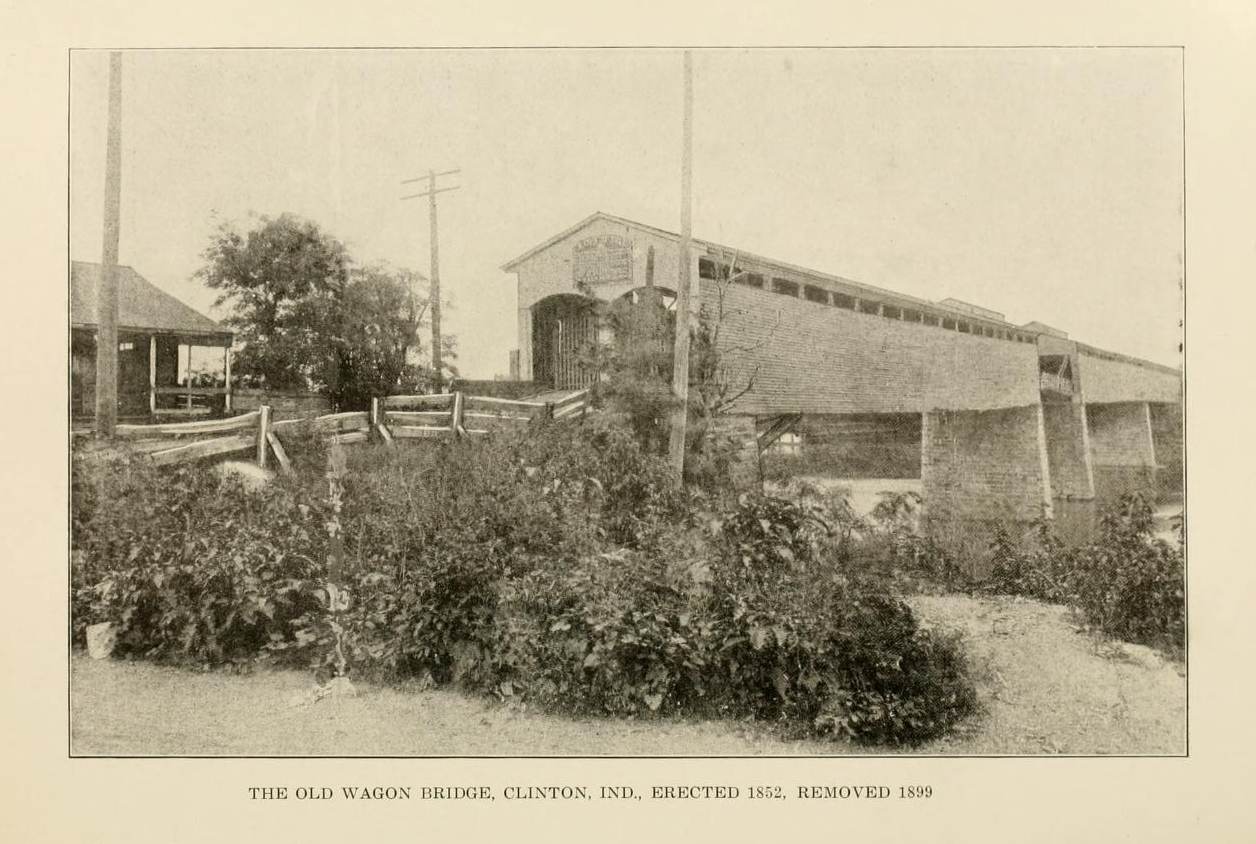
- Double lane covered bridge in Clinton, Indiana
- Coordinates: 39°39′25.28″N 87°23′43.66″W
- Carries: Elm Street
- Crosses: Wabash River
- Locale: Parke, Indiana, United States
- Official name: Clinton Covered Bridge
- Named for: Clinton, Indiana

Characteristics
- Total length: 790 ft (240 m)including draw span

History
- Constructed by: Hirem Bishop
- Construction end: 1853

Location
- Interactive map of Clinton Covered Bridge

The Clinton Covered Bridge was on the east side of Clinton, Indiana. The Long Truss style bridge with double lanes, triple covered spans and one 70 foot draw span was built by Hirem Bishop in 1852-53 and destroyed by electric cutting wire in 1899.

== History ==
=== Construction ===
This is the "1/2" bridge of Parke County. It crossed the Wabash River at Clinton, In, located in Vermillion County, Indiana. The bridge had originally been proposed by the Wabash and Erie Canal to connect Clinton with Clinton Locks, now Lyford. Canal Engineer T.L. Williams had estimated that the bridge would cost between $25,000 and $30,000, the Wabash & Erie Canal even gave $16,700 towards the bridge with the balance to be paid by the farms and citizens of Clinton.

In a letter dated September 10, 1851 to Joseph J. Daniels there is indication that he and A.B. Condit intended to bid on the contract for the bridge under the name of Daniels and Condit Bridge Builders. However, in 1852 the contract was awarded to a Mr. Bishop; this could be the same C.W. Bishop that is credited with building Irishman's Bridge in Vigo County in 1845. He in turn hired his brother, Hirem Bishop, as foreman. Hirem was also credited as the builder. Bishop purchased two lots located north of the bridge site which he used to build the bridge frames starting in 1852. In June 1853 the frames were dismantled and reassembled on the piers already built in the Wabash River.

It can be noted that the two lots stayed in the Bishop family for years with Hirem building a "home place" on one lot with his son building a house on the other lot. Today these lots are occupied by Mike's Motors.

=== Use ===
To partially recover the costs of construction and maintenance, also to earn a profit, the Clinton Covered Bridge was a toll bridge, because of this it would also be considered a private bridge. The toll keepers lived and worked out of the toll house located on the north corner of the Clinton side of the bridge. Francis Cunningham would be the toll keeper from around 1870 until his death in 1880. A.T. Patterson, who worked for J.J. Daniels building the Terre Haute Ohio Street Covered Bridge and Hirem Bishop building the Clinton Covered Bridge, worked as a toll keeper in his retirement years. There is a source that claims a Mr. Weber was the last toll keeper, but another source states that John H. Birt was actually the last toll keeper. Mr. Birt lived in the toll house and maintained a shoe shop there where he made and repaired shoes. Dr. J.H. Bogart was the last private owner of the bridge. In February 1892 he sold it to the Vermillion County Commissions for $4,500 with a few stipulations. First, he wanted to retain possession and continue collecting tolls until the bridge was destroyed, and, second, he would be the one to destroy it, in a safe and acceptable manner.

=== Destruction ===
It was felt by the newly formed Businessmen's Association of Clinton that the bridge needed to be replaced by a free bridge because Clinton had transformed from pork packing houses on the river to a downtown business financed and frequented by coal miners from Parke County. The association claimed that the toll bridge was keeping the miners out of Clinton and keeping them from spending money in their stores.

It's claimed that the deadline for the original contract to dismantle the bridge was not met and that the idea for the eventual destruction of the bridge came to Dr. Bogart while he sat on his Mulberry Street office's porch in August 1899. Seeing a bolt of lightning convinced Dr. Bogart that electricity could be used. There was a young electrician across the street named Henry Mills, along with Roscoe Russel and Carl F. Balmer, that would wire the bridge for electrocution. According to Balmer they drilled holes through the spans and threaded the wires through, they then hung weights on the wires to pull them through the timbers and drop the spans into the Wabash River below. Using this method would avoid the dangers of a dynamite blast or dismantling the bridge piece by piece and allow the lumber to be reused.

The town generator, later to be owned by [Public Service of Indiana], was run by Balmer, but only capable of 1100 volts. Because of this they "reversed the currant to increase the amperage"(sic). No details were published the day of the demolition and the whole town had turned out by early morning to watch. By lunch time nothing had happened and they began to laugh and make fun of Dr. Bogart. The draw span had already been removed and the east end was wired to burn first. It wasn't until the afternoon that a thin smoke without any noticeable flame was finally seen. Then pieces of the spans began to drop into the water below which men in boats began to gather. With the success the remaining spans were wired and dismantled in the same way. The amazing method was talked about all over the county.

== See also ==
- Parke County Covered Bridges
- Parke County Covered Bridge Festival
