= Jessup Covered Bridge =

Bridge in United States of America

- Coordinates: 39°39′49.87″N 87°15′23.68″W
- Crossed: Little Raccoon Creek
- Locale: Parke County, Indiana, United States
- Official name: Jessup Covered Bridge
- Named for: Jessup, Indiana
- WGCB Number: 14-61-06x

Characteristics
- Total length: 175 ft (53 m)155ft +10ft overhangs on each end
- Width: 16 ft (4.9 m)
- Height: 13 ft (4.0 m)

History
- Constructed by: Jefferson P. Van Fossen
- Built: 1910
- Destroyed: 1989 Flood

Location
- Interactive map of Jessup Covered Bridge

The Jessup Covered Bridge was north of Jessup, Indiana. The single-span Burr Arch covered bridge structure was built by the Jefferson P. Van Fossen in 1910 and destroyed by flood in 1989.

== History ==
=== Construction ===
Originally the main road to Rockville from Terre Haute was through Coxville, with this bridge it was shorter to go through what was originally Jessup Station. By 1969 though the bridge had been bypassed and closed by a new bridge. However, a December flood in 1969 would give the bridge a new leese on life.

=== Move ===
It was decided, after the Adams Covered Bridge was destroyed by flood waters in 1969, that the Jessup Covered bridge could replace it. Elmer Buchta of Buchta Trucking was contracted for the 12-mile move to the Adams Bridge.

After several days of removing the south abutment, the bridge was jacked onto two sets of multi-wheeled dollies. On Tuesday, February 3, 1970, the Jessup Covered Bridge started its road trip to what would be its home for the next 20 years, until it would meet the same fate as its predecessor. The bridge was first pulled to Catlin where it took 3 1/2 hours to get around the two 90-degree turns. That night it was held at Catlin before making its way to Rockville on Wednesday. The trip was slowed because of three county bridges it had to pass over. The Highway Department had already applied a foot and a half of dirt on the bridge deck to lift the bridge over the concrete rails but additional cribbing was needed to allow the bridge to clear. That night the bridge was parked in front of Ferguson Lumber on S. Market Street on the south side of Rockville. On Thursday the bridge moved uphill to the courthouse square. The traffic lights had already been moved and the bridge made its right-hand turn onto U.S. 36. From there it probably traveled down U.S. 36 to Adams Road, which leads to the Adams Farm and the new location for the bridge.(39°46′52″N 87°8′42″W) Over the weekend, however, disaster struck in the form of warming weather which allowed to ground to thaw, which brought the move to a halt until temperatures dropped on Monday so that by Wednesday the ground had refroze. On Wednesday the bridge was able to be pulled across a big field and jacked into its new location 12 miles upstream from its original location.

=== Destruction ===
In 1989 a large tree broke the arches and collapsed the bridge. Again, like the Adams Covered Bridge before it, it was washed downstream, under the Sanitorium Covered Bridge and over the U.S. 36 concrete bridge, the former site of the Plank Road Covered Bridge, and jammed further downstream. By September 1990, Parke County Incorporated was attempting to acquire the Cedar Ford Covered Bridge from Shelby County, Indiana. Meanwhile, the County Highway Superintendent, Tom Martin, stated that the laminated floor boards, which is the major recurring maintenance performed on the covered bridges, had been recovered from the bridge but because the bridge would be too hard to recover from the creek bed and it was unneeded for other bridge repairs that it evidently wouldn't be removed intact.

== See also ==
- Parke County Covered Bridges
- Parke County Covered Bridge Festival
