= Sanitorium Covered Bridge =

Place in Indiana listed on National Register of Historic Places

State Sanitorium Covered Bridge
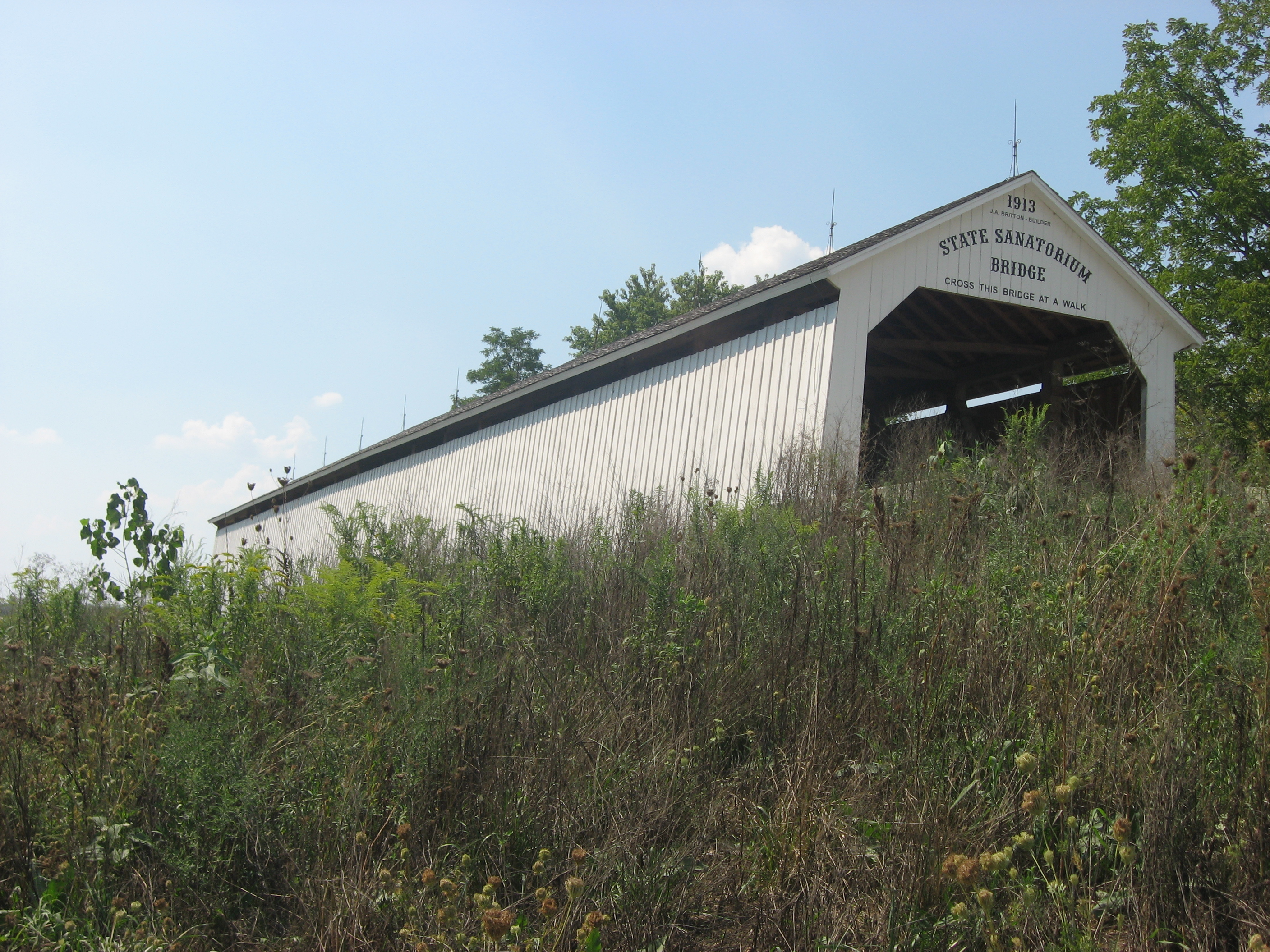
- Southern Side and Eastern Portal
- Coordinates: 39°46′52″N 87°8′42″W
- Carries: C.R. 100N
- Crosses: Little Raccoon Creek
- Locale: Parke County, Indiana, United States
- Official name: State Sanitorium Covered Bridge
- Named for: The State Sanitorium
- Maintained by: Parke County
- NBI Number: 6100240

Characteristics
- Design: National Register of Historic Places
- Total length: 170 ft (52 m)154ft +8ft overhangs on each end
- Width: 16 ft (4.9 m)
- Height: 12.5 ft (3.8 m)

History
- Constructed by: Britton, J.A.
- Built: 1913
- Rebuilt: 2008
- Sanitorium Covered Bridge
- U.S. National Register of Historic Places
- MPS: Parke County Covered Bridges TR
- NRHP reference No.: 78000412
- Added to NRHP: Dec 22, 1978

Location
- Interactive map of State Sanitorium Covered Bridge

The Sanitorium Covered Bridge is a bridged located east of Rockville, Indiana. The single-span Burr Arch covered bridge structure was built by Joseph A. Britton in 1913.

It was added to the National Register of Historic Places in 1978.

== History ==
On March 8, 1907, the 65th Indiana General Assembly approved funding to establish and fund a State Tuberculosis Hospital or Sanitorium. By 1908 the State had appropriated land east of Rockville for the use of the State Tuberculosis Hospital. The Sanitorium was soon up and running in 1910.

Originally built on the property of the State Sanitorium, located a mile or so downstream (39°45′57.6″N 87°9′40.7″W) from its current site, for hauling coal to the Sanitorium. The Sanitorium used coal, mined only a couple of miles away near Nyesville, for both heat and for its powerplant. This coal would have been hauled to Rockville and then east across the Plank Road Bridge to the Sanitorium before the bridge being built. The Plank Road Bridge was washed out in the flood of 1913 and was replaced with the Howard Bridge, also built by Britton the same year.

Being on private property after the State sold the Sanitorium the bridge fell into disrepair. On July 30, 2008, the $1.34 million project to move the bridge to the former site of the Adams Covered Bridge was started. The Adams Bridge had been located about a mile upstream and had been built in 1907 by J.P. Van Fossen. In 1969 the bridge was destroyed by a flood where it washed downstream and under the Sanitorium Bridge. During February 3–11, 1970, the Jessup Covered Bridge was moved to replace it. Again in 1989 flood waters would wash this bridge downstream and under the Sanitorium Bridge and over the U.S. 36 bridge. By December 29, 2008, the bridge was open to traffic.

== See also ==
- List of Registered Historic Places in Indiana
- Parke County Covered Bridges
- Parke County Covered Bridge Festival
