= Bellmore, Indiana =

Unincorporated community in Indiana, United States

- Unincorporated community
- Parke County's location in Indiana

- Location in Park County
- Coordinates: 39°45′33″N 87°06′19″W
- Country: United States
- State: Indiana
- County: Parke
- Township: Union
- Elevation: 741 ft (226 m)
- Time zone: UTC-5 (Eastern (EST))
  - Summer (DST): UTC-4 (EDT)
- ZIP code: 47830
- Area code: 765
- GNIS feature ID: 430781

Bellmore (also known as Belle Moore, North Hampton or Northampton) is an unincorporated community in Union Township, Parke County, in the U.S. state of Indiana. U.S. Route 36 and State Road 59 intersect in Bellmore.

== History ==
A post office has been in operation at Bellmore since 1852.

== Notable people ==
- Knute Cauldwell, NFL player
