= Grange Corner, Indiana =

- Unincorporated community
- Vigo County's location in Indiana

- location in Vigo County, Indiana
- Coordinates: 39°26′45″N 87°15′29″W
- Country: United States
- State: Indiana
- County: Vigo
- Township: Lost Creek
- Elevation: 587 ft (179 m)
- Time zone: UTC-5 (Eastern (EST))
  - Summer (DST): UTC-4 (EDT)
- ZIP code: 47802
- Area codes: 812, 930
- GNIS feature ID: 435311

Grange Corner is an unincorporated community in southeastern Lost Creek Township, Vigo County, in the U.S. state of Indiana.

It is part of the Terre Haute metropolitan area.

== Geography ==
Grange Corner is located at 39°26′45″N 87°15′29″W at an elevation of 587 feet.
