= Hollandsburg, Indiana =

Unincorporated community in Indiana, United States

- Unincorporated community
- Parke County's location in Indiana

- Location in Parke County
- Coordinates: 39°45′37″N 87°04′20″W
- Country: United States
- State: Indiana
- County: Parke
- Township: Union
- Elevation: 741 ft (226 m)
- Time zone: UTC-5 (Eastern (EST))
  - Summer (DST): UTC-4 (EDT)
- ZIP code: 47872
- Area code: 765
- GNIS feature ID: 449670

Hollandsburg or Hollandsburgh is an unincorporated community in Union Township, Parke County, in the U.S. state of Indiana.

== History ==
A post office was established at Hollandsburg in 1853, and remained in operation until it was discontinued in 1902. The community was named for a Kentucky minister named Holland who was a personal friend of John Collings, who built the first residence.

The town was the site of the 1977 St. Valentine's Day Massacre, in which four young men entered a trailer home and shot to death four brothers and wounded their mother.

Ralph Spencer (14), Reeve B. Spencer (16), Raymond M. Spencer (17), stepbrother Gregory B. Brooks (22) and their mother, Betty Spencer were victims of the attack. It was assumed that Betty Spencer likely only survived due to her wig being knocked off by a gun blast - the assailants likely believing it was a portion of her head. Betty Spencer pretended to be dead until the killers left.

Roger Drollinger, a 24 year old habitual criminal, expected to go to prison the next day on a drug charge, and decided to commit a thrill killing while he still had the opportunity. Drollinger and his followers – Daniel Stonebraker, Michael Wright, and David Smith – were all found guilty of murder and sentenced to life in prison. Roger Drollinger, then aged 60, died in prison on January 29, 2014.
