= West Union, Indiana =

Unincorporated community in Indiana, United States

- Unincorporated community
- Parke County's location in Indiana

- Location in Parke County
- Coordinates: 39°50′37″N 87°20′12″W
- Country: United States
- State: Indiana
- County: Parke
- Township: Reserve
- Elevation: 528 ft (161 m)
- Time zone: UTC-5 (Eastern (EST))
  - Summer (DST): UTC-4 (EDT)
- ZIP code: 47862
- Area code: 765
- GNIS feature ID: 445818

West Union (also called Delta or Union) is an unincorporated community in Reserve Township, Parke County, in the U.S. state of Indiana.

== History ==
West Union was platted in 1837. A post office was established at West Union in 1886, and remained in operation until it was discontinued in 1932.
