= Union Township, Parke County, Indiana =

Union Township
- Township
- Location in Parke County
- Coordinates: 39°44′05″N 87°03′42″W
- Country: United States
- State: Indiana
- County: Parke

Government
  - Type: Indiana township

Area
  - Total: 35.79 sq mi (92.7 km^{2})
  - Land: 32.7 sq mi (85 km^{2})
  - Water: 3.09 sq mi (8.0 km^{2}) 8.63%
- Elevation: 712 ft (217 m)

Population (2020)
  - Total: 1,482
  - Density: 45.3/sq mi (17.5/km^{2})
- Time zone: UTC-5 (Eastern (EST))
  - Summer (DST): UTC-4 (EDT)
- ZIP codes: 47834, 47837, 47872
- Area code: 765
- GNIS feature ID: 453928

Union Township is one of thirteen townships in Parke County, Indiana, United States. As of the 2020 census, its population was 1,482 and it contained 1,207 housing units.

Historical population
Census	Pop.	Note	%±
1890	1,211		—
1900	1,173		−3.1%
1910	948		−19.2%
1920	920		−3.0%
1930	754		−18.0%
1940	815		8.1%
1950	726		−10.9%
1960	551		−24.1%
1970	698		26.7%
1980	1,172		67.9%
1990	1,169		−0.3%
2000	1,569		34.2%
2010	1,562		−0.4%
2020	1,482		−5.1%
Source: US Decennial Census

== History ==
The West Union Covered Bridge was listed on the National Register of Historic Places in 1978.

== Geography ==
According to the 2010 census, the township has a total area of 35.79 square miles (92.7 km^{2}), of which 32.7 square miles (85 km^{2}) (or 91.37%) is land and 3.09 square miles (8.0 km^{2}) (or 8.63%) is water.

=== Unincorporated towns ===
- Bellmore at 39.759209°N 87.105291°W
- Ferndale at 39.707265°N 87.066957°W
- Hollandsburg at 39.760321°N 87.072235°W

(This list is based on USGS data and may include former settlements.)

=== Cemeteries ===
The township contains these five cemeteries: Blake, Burton, Martin, Roach and Thomas.

=== Major highways ===
- U.S. Route 36
- Indiana State Road 59

== School districts ==
- North Central Parke Community School Corporation
- Formerly: Rockville Community Schools

== Political districts ==
- State House District 44
- State Senate District 38
