= J. J. Daniels =

American bridge builder

Joseph J. Daniels (c. 1826–1916), most commonly known as J. J. Daniels, was an American bridge builder active in Indiana. A number of his works are listed on the U.S. National Register of Historic Places.

He was born in about 1826 in Marietta, Ohio and learned about bridges from his father, also a bridge builder. His last bridge was the Neet Bridge, built in 1904. He died in Rockville, Indiana at age 90.

Works (attribution) include:

- Big Rocky Fork Bridge, SE of Mansfield on Greencastle Rd., Mansfield, Indiana (Daniels, J. J.), NRHP-listed
- Billie Creek Bridge, E of Rockville off US 36, Billie Creek Village, Rockville, Indiana (Daniels, J. J.), NRHP-listed
- Bridgeton Bridge, N of Bridgeton, Bridgeton, Indiana (Daniels, J. J.), NRHP-listed
- Eugene Covered Bridge, Former Co. Rd. 00 over Big Vermillion R., Eugene, Indiana (Daniels, Joseph J.), NRHP-listed
- Jackson Bridge, N of Rockville, Rockville, Indiana (Daniels, J. J.), NRHP-listed
- Mansfield Covered Bridge, Off IN 59, Mansfield, Indiana (Daniels, J. J.), NRHP-listed
- Mecca Bridge, Off US 41, Mecca, Indiana (Daniels, J. J.), NRHP-listed
- Medora Covered Bridge, off IN 235, 0.5 miles (0.8 km) SE of Medora over the east fork of the White River, Medora, Indiana (Daniels, Joseph J.), NRHP-listed
- Melcher Bridge, E of Montezuma, Montezuma, Indiana (Daniels, J. J.), NRHP-listed
- Neet Bridge, N of Bridgeton, Bridgeton, Indiana (Daniels, J. J.), NRHP-listed
- Newport Covered Bridge, Co. Rd. 50N over Little Vermillion R., Newport, Indiana (Daniels, Joseph J.), NRHP-listed
- Possum Bottom Covered Bridge, US 36, N side, 0.2 miles (0.3 km) E of the jct. with East Rd., Dana, Indiana (Daniels, Joseph J.), NRHP-listed
- West Union Bridge, N of Montezuma, Indiana (Daniels, J. J.), NRHP-listed
- Williams Bridge, SW of Williams on CR 11, Williams, Indiana (Daniels, J. J.), NRHP-listed
