= Parke County Covered Bridges =

Infrastructure in Indiana, US

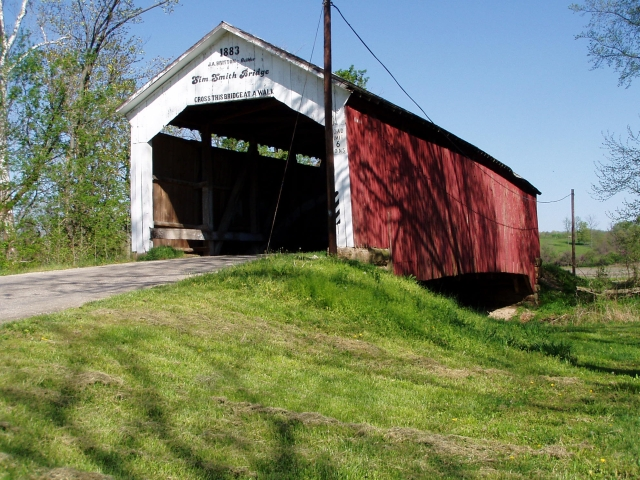
Sims Smith Covered Bridge, Parke County, Indiana

The covered bridges of Parke County are well-known tourist attractions in Parke County, Indiana, United States, which touts itself as the "Covered Bridge Capital of the World". The county claims to have more covered bridges than any other county in the United States. This is due to several reasons, mainly due to the numerous streams and creeks in the county, and having the natural resources and designers to build the bridges.

Most were built of poplar wood and built Burr Arch style. The main designers of the bridges were J.J. Daniels, J.A. Britton, William Hendricks, and Henry Wolf.

At one time, as many as 53 covered bridges existed (wholly or in part) in Parke County. Today, 31 of those bridges survive, 10 of which have been closed to vehicle traffic.

The Jackson Covered Bridge is the longest single span covered bridge in Indiana. The Portland Mills Covered Bridge is the oldest of the county's covered bridges.

On December 22, 1978, all covered bridges still standing within the county were part of the Parke County Covered Bridges TR Multiple Property Submission, and went on the National Register of Historic Places.

== Tourism ==
Tourists may view the historic bridges using five color-coded driving routes marked with roadside signs.

Every year there is a covered bridge festival in October to celebrate the covered bridges in Indiana. In 2005 it was voted "Big Secrets Local Finds" by Travelocity.

== See also ==
- List of Registered Historic Places in Indiana
- List of Indiana covered bridges
- Lost covered bridges of Parke County, Indiana
