= Parke County Covered Bridge Festival =

Annual fall festival in Indiana, US

Coordinates: 39°45′43.1″N 87°13′24.5″W

The Parke County Covered Bridge Festival is a fall festival which takes place in nine communities in Parke County, Indiana, United States. It celebrates the county's 31 covered bridges, and is attended by more than 2 million people each year. It begins on the second Friday in October and lasts 10 days.

Attractions include the Bridgeton Covered Bridge, Fox's Overlook, Boardwalk and Parke Place, waterfall, historic mill, and the beautiful covered bridge.

The festival began in 1957, when a group of local women decided to hold a three-day festival to accommodate the many interested tourists looking for information about the bridges. Now the festival is thriving and puts Parke County on the map 10 days of the year. The first festival was rather small and occurred only in Rockville. Bridgeton, Indiana is the largest gathering for the festival.

2020 saw no festival.

== See also ==
- Parke County Covered Bridges
