= Adams Township =

Adams Township may refer to:

== Illinois ==
- Adams Township, La Salle County, Illinois

== Indiana ==
- Adams Township, Allen County, Indiana
- Adams Township, Carroll County, Indiana
- Adams Township, Cass County, Indiana
- Adams Township, Decatur County, Indiana
- Adams Township, Hamilton County, Indiana
- Adams Township, Madison County, Indiana
- Adams Township, Morgan County, Indiana
- Adams Township, Parke County, Indiana
- Adams Township, Ripley County, Indiana
- Adams Township, Warren County, Indiana

== Iowa ==
- Adams Township, Dallas County, Iowa
- Adams Township, Delaware County, Iowa
- Adams Township, Keokuk County, Iowa
- Adams Township, Mahaska County, Iowa
- Adams Township, Wapello County, Iowa

== Kansas ==
- Adams Township, Nemaha County, Kansas

== Michigan ==
- Adams Township, Arenac County, Michigan
- Adams Township, Hillsdale County, Michigan
- Adams Township, Houghton County, Michigan

== Minnesota ==
- Adams Township, Mower County, Minnesota

== Missouri ==
- Adams Township, DeKalb County, Missouri
- Adams Township, Harrison County, Missouri

== Nebraska ==
- Adams Township, Nebraska

== North Dakota ==
- Adams Township, North Dakota

== Ohio ==
- Adams Township, Champaign County, Ohio
- Adams Township, Clinton County, Ohio
- Adams Township, Coshocton County, Ohio
- Adams Township, Darke County, Ohio
- Adams Township, Defiance County, Ohio
- Adams Township, Guernsey County, Ohio
- Adams Township, Lucas County, Ohio, defunct, incorporated into the city of Toledo
- Adams Township, Monroe County, Ohio
- Adams Township, Muskingum County, Ohio
- Adams Township, Seneca County, Ohio
- Adams Township, Washington County, Ohio

== Oklahoma ==
- Adams Township, Harper County, Oklahoma

== Pennsylvania ==
- Adams Township, Butler County, Pennsylvania
- Adams Township, Cambria County, Pennsylvania
- Adams Township, Snyder County, Pennsylvania

== South Dakota ==
- Adams Township, Grant County, South Dakota
- Adams Township, Miner County, South Dakota

== See also ==
- Adams (disambiguation)
