= Adams Township, Iowa =

Adams Township, Iowa may refer to the following places:

- Adams Township, Dallas County, Iowa
- Adams Township, Delaware County, Iowa
- Adams Township, Keokuk County, Iowa
- Adams Township, Mahaska County, Iowa
- Adams Township, Wapello County, Iowa

== See also ==
- Adams Township (disambiguation)
