= Adams Township, South Dakota =

Adams Township, South Dakota may refer to the following places:

- Adams Township, Grant County, South Dakota
- Adams Township, Miner County, South Dakota

== See also ==
- Adams Township (disambiguation)
