= Nebraska Highway 41 =

State highway in Nebraska, U.S.

State Highway 41

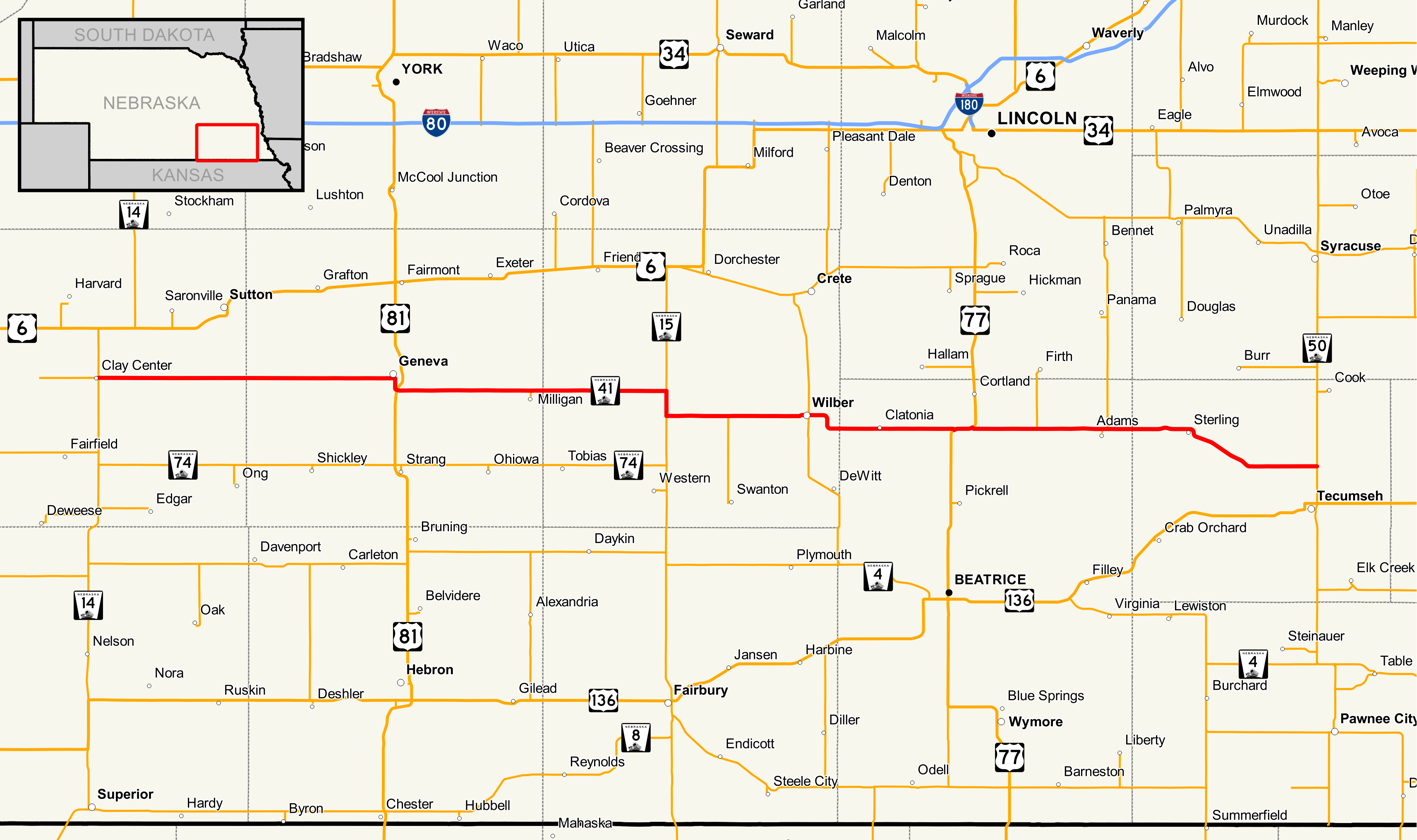
- Nebraska Highway 41 highlighted in red

Route information
- Maintained by NDOT
- Length: 103.57 mi (166.68 km)
- Existed: 1926–present

Major junctions
- West end: N-14 / S-18D in Clay Center
- US 81 southeast of Geneva; N-15 east of Milligan; US 77 southwest of Cortland
- East end: N-50 north of Tecumseh

Location
- Country: United States
- State: Nebraska
- Counties: Clay, Fillmore, Saline, Gage, Johnson

Highway system
- Nebraska State Highway System; Interstate; US; State; Link; Spur; State Spurs; Recreation
← N-40	→ N-43

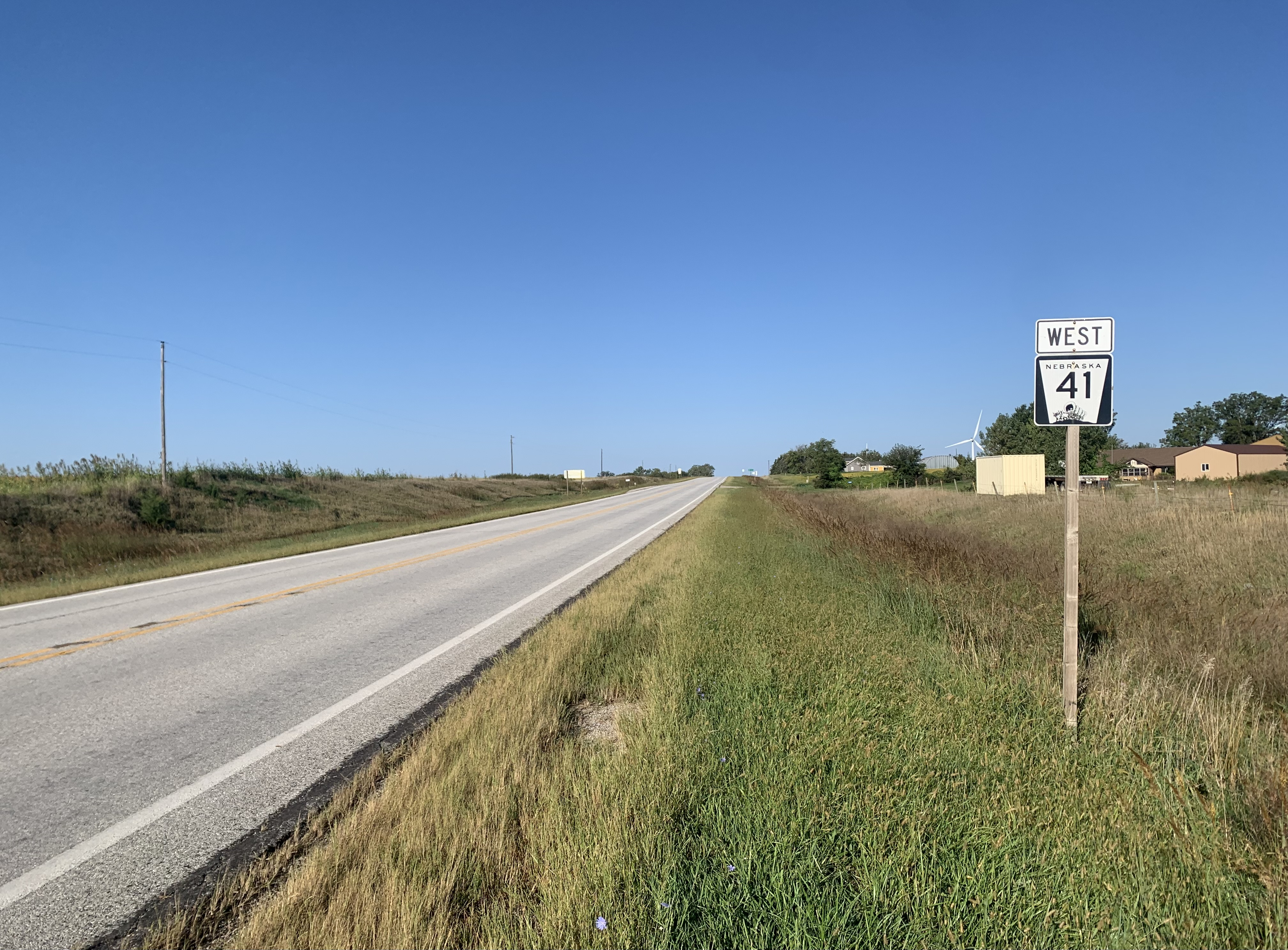
Nebraska Highway 41 in Saline County, Nebraska

Nebraska Highway 41 is a highway in Nebraska. It runs for a length of 103.53 miles (166.62 km) in a west-to-east direction. Its western terminus is in Clay Center at an intersection with Nebraska Highway 14 and Nebraska Spur 18D. Its eastern terminus is at an intersection with Nebraska Highway 50 north of Tecumseh.

== Route description ==
Nebraska Highway 41 begins in Clay Center at an intersection with Nebraska Highway 14 and Nebraska Spur 18D. It goes east out of Clay Center into farmland until Geneva. In Geneva, it runs on an old alignment of U.S. Highway 81. It meets US 81 just east of Geneva and continues east until meeting Nebraska Highway 15. The two highways overlap for 2 miles (3.2 km). It turns east and at Wilber, meets Nebraska Highway 103. It continues east through Clatonia and briefly overlaps U.S. Highway 77. It continues east and meets Nebraska Highway 43 at Adams. Highway 41 continues east until Sterling, where it then angles southeasterly until St. Mary. After St. Mary, the highway turns straight east again and ends at Nebraska Highway 50 north of Tecumseh.

== Major intersections ==
County	Location	mi	km	Destinations	Notes
Clay	Clay Center	0.00	0.00	N-14 (Center Street) / S-18D west (West Johnson Street)	Western terminus
Fillmore	Geneva	25.02	40.27	US 81	
Fillmore	Milligan	35.83	57.66	S-30H south	
Saline		46.82	75.35	N-15 north (County Road 1100)	West end of N-15 overlap
Saline		48.83	78.58	N-15 south (County Road 1100)	East end of N-15 overlap
Saline	Swanton	53.83	86.63	S-76D south (County Road 1600)	
Saline	Wilber	60.37	97.16	N-103 (South Main Street)	
Gage		73.04	117.55	US 77 south (Southwest 14th Road)	West end of US 77 overlap
Gage		74.54	119.96	US 77 north (South 12th Road)	East end of US 77 overlap
Gage	Firth	79.83	128.47	S-34B north (South 82nd Road)	
Gage	Adams	85.11	136.97	S-34C south	
Gage	Adams	85.55	137.68	N-43 north	
Johnson		103.57	166.68	N-50	Eastern terminus
1.000 mi = 1.609 km; 1.000 km = 0.621 mi: Concurrency terminus
