= Adams Township, Michigan =

Adams Township is the name of some places in the U.S. state of Michigan:

- Adams Township, Arenac County, Michigan
- Adams Township, Hillsdale County, Michigan
- Adams Township, Houghton County, Michigan

== See also ==
- Adams Township (disambiguation)
