= Adams Township, Parke County, Indiana =

Township in Indiana, United States

Adams Township
- Township
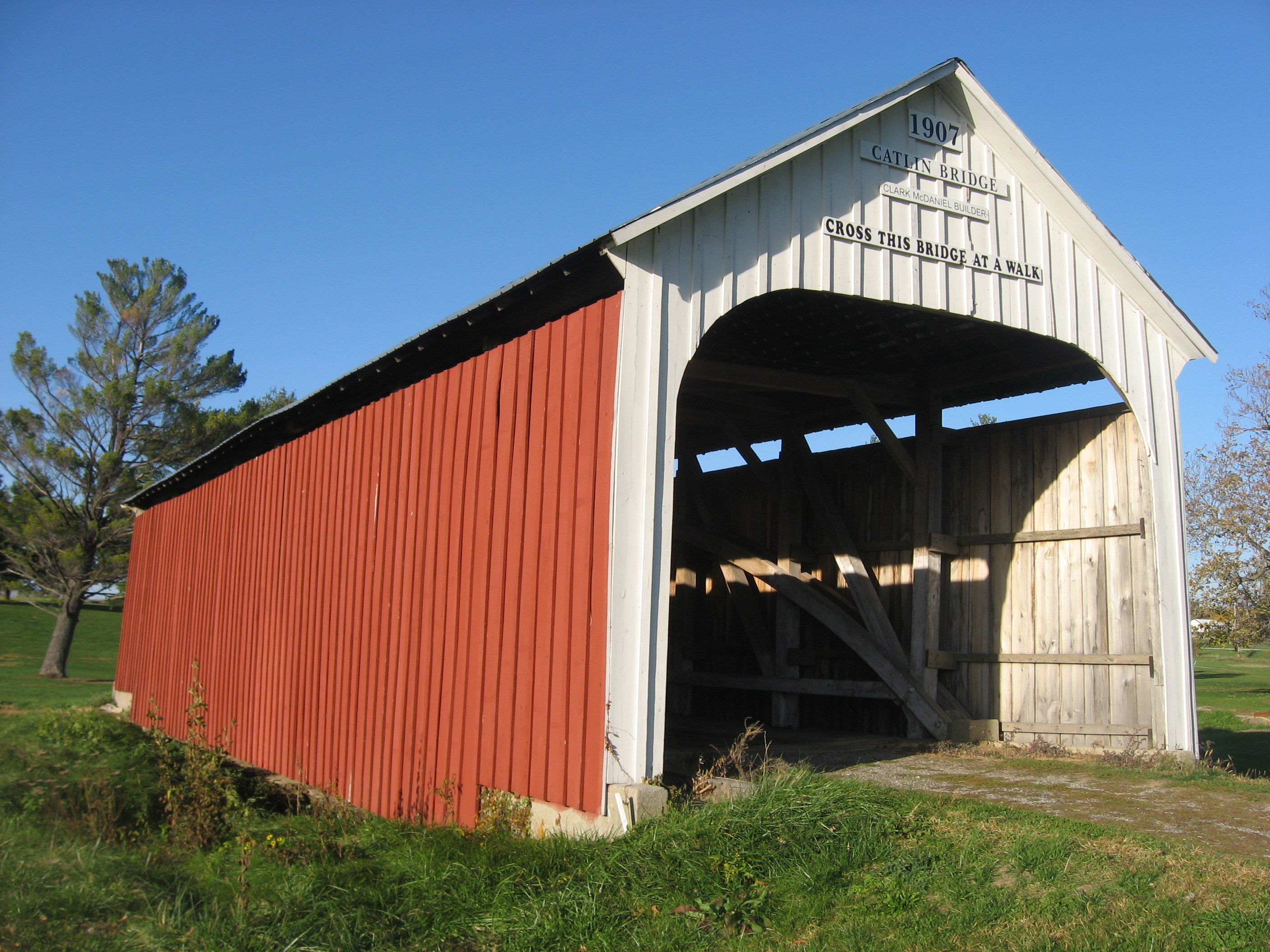
- The Catlin Covered Bridge in the township's north

- Location in Parke County
- Coordinates: 39°44′25″N 87°12′32″W
- Country: United States
- State: Indiana
- County: Parke

Government
  - Type: Indiana township

Area
  - Total: 56.07 sq mi (145.2 km^{2})
  - Land: 55.8 sq mi (145 km^{2})
  - Water: 0.27 sq mi (0.70 km^{2}) 0.48%
- Elevation: 571 ft (174 m)

Population (2020)
  - Total: 5,100
  - Density: 91/sq mi (35/km^{2})
- Time zone: UTC-5 (Eastern (EST))
  - Summer (DST): UTC-4 (EDT)
- ZIP codes: 47832, 47872
- Area code: 765
- GNIS feature ID: 453080

Adams Township is one of thirteen townships in Parke County, Indiana, United States. As of the 2020 census, its population was 5,100 and it contained 1,985 housing units.

Historical population
Census	Pop.	Note	%±
1890	3,278		—
1900	3,637		11.0%
1910	3,360		−7.6%
1920	3,501		4.2%
1930	3,379		−3.5%
1940	3,741		10.7%
1950	3,964		6.0%
1960	4,214		6.3%
1970	4,161		−1.3%
1980	4,535		9.0%
1990	4,628		2.1%
2000	5,399		16.7%
2010	5,825		7.9%
2020	5,100		−12.4%
Source: US Decennial Census

== History ==
Adams Township was named for James Adams, a pioneer settler, but the date of the township's organization is unknown because early records were lost.

The Beeson Covered Bridge, Billie Creek Covered Bridge, Catlin Covered Bridge, Crooks Covered Bridge, Leatherwood Station Covered Bridge, McAllister Covered Bridge, Neet Covered Bridge, and Sanitorium Covered Bridge were listed on the National Register of Historic Places in 1978.

== Geography ==
According to the 2010 census, the township has a total area of 56.07 square miles (145.2 km^{2}), of which 55.8 square miles (145 km^{2}) (or 99.52%) is land and 0.27 square miles (0.70 km^{2}) (or 0.48%) is water.

=== Cities, towns, villages ===
- Rockville (the county seat)

=== Unincorporated towns ===
- Billie Creek Village at 39.76143°N 87.201958°W
- Piattsville at 39.704486°N 87.125847°W

(This list is based on USGS data and may include former settlements.)

=== Cemeteries ===
The township contains these four cemeteries: Hatfield, Memory Garden, Rowe and Union.

=== Major highways ===
- U.S. Route 36
- U.S. Route 41

=== Airports and landing strips ===
- Butler Field

== School districts ==
- North Central Parke Community School Corporation
- Formerly: Rockville Community Schools

== Political districts ==
- State House District 42
- State House District 44
- State Senate District 38
