= Nebraska Highway 43 =

State highway in Nebraska, U.S.

State Highway 43

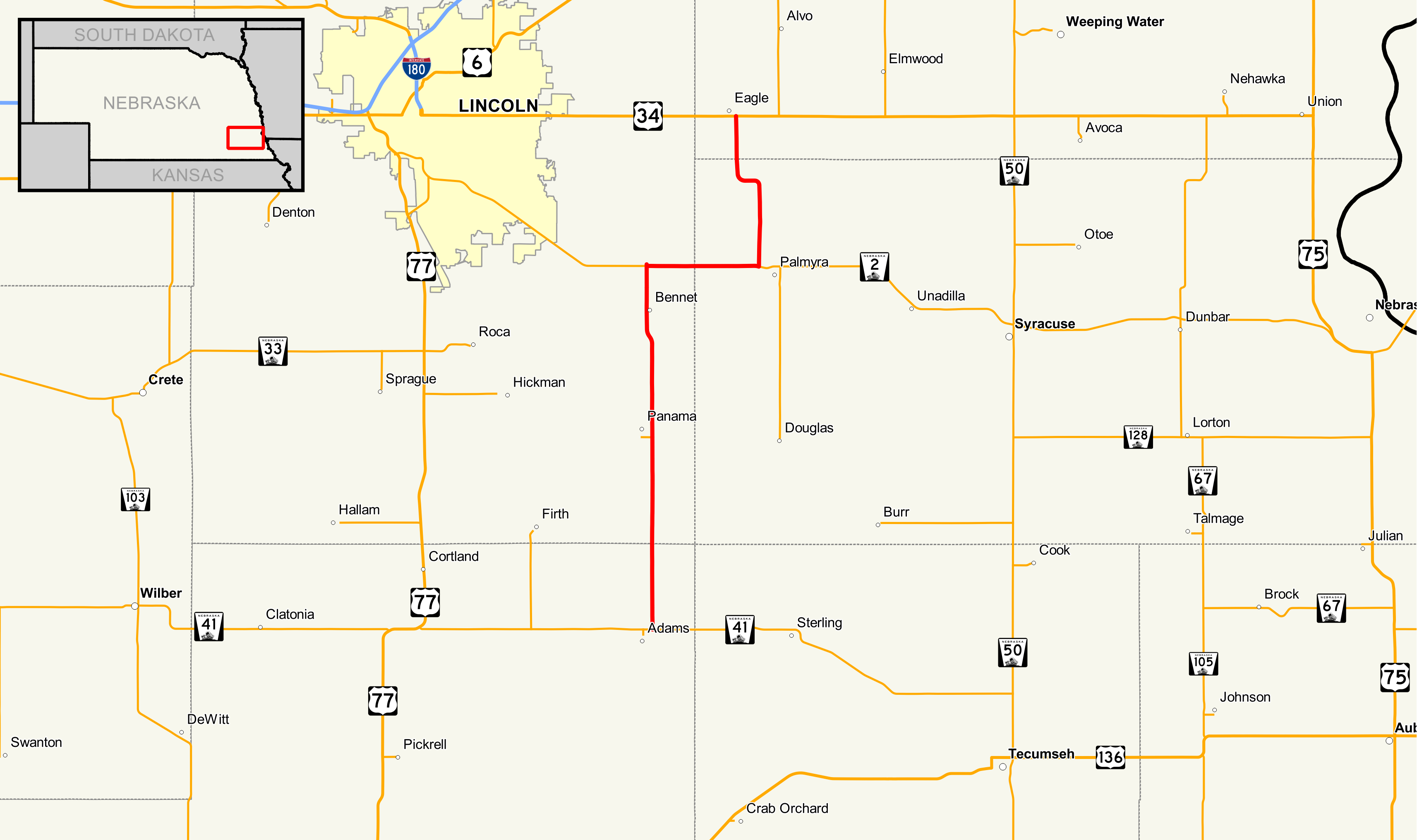
- Nebraska Highway 43 highlighted in red

Route information
- Maintained by NDOT
- Length: 30.22 mi (48.63 km)

Major junctions
- South end: N-41 northeast of Adams
- N-2 concurrent between Bennet and Palmyra
- North end: US 34 in Eagle

Location
- Country: United States
- State: Nebraska
- Counties: Gage, Lancaster, Otoe, Cass

Highway system
- Nebraska State Highway System; Interstate; US; State; Link; Spur; State Spurs; Recreation
← N-41	→ N-44

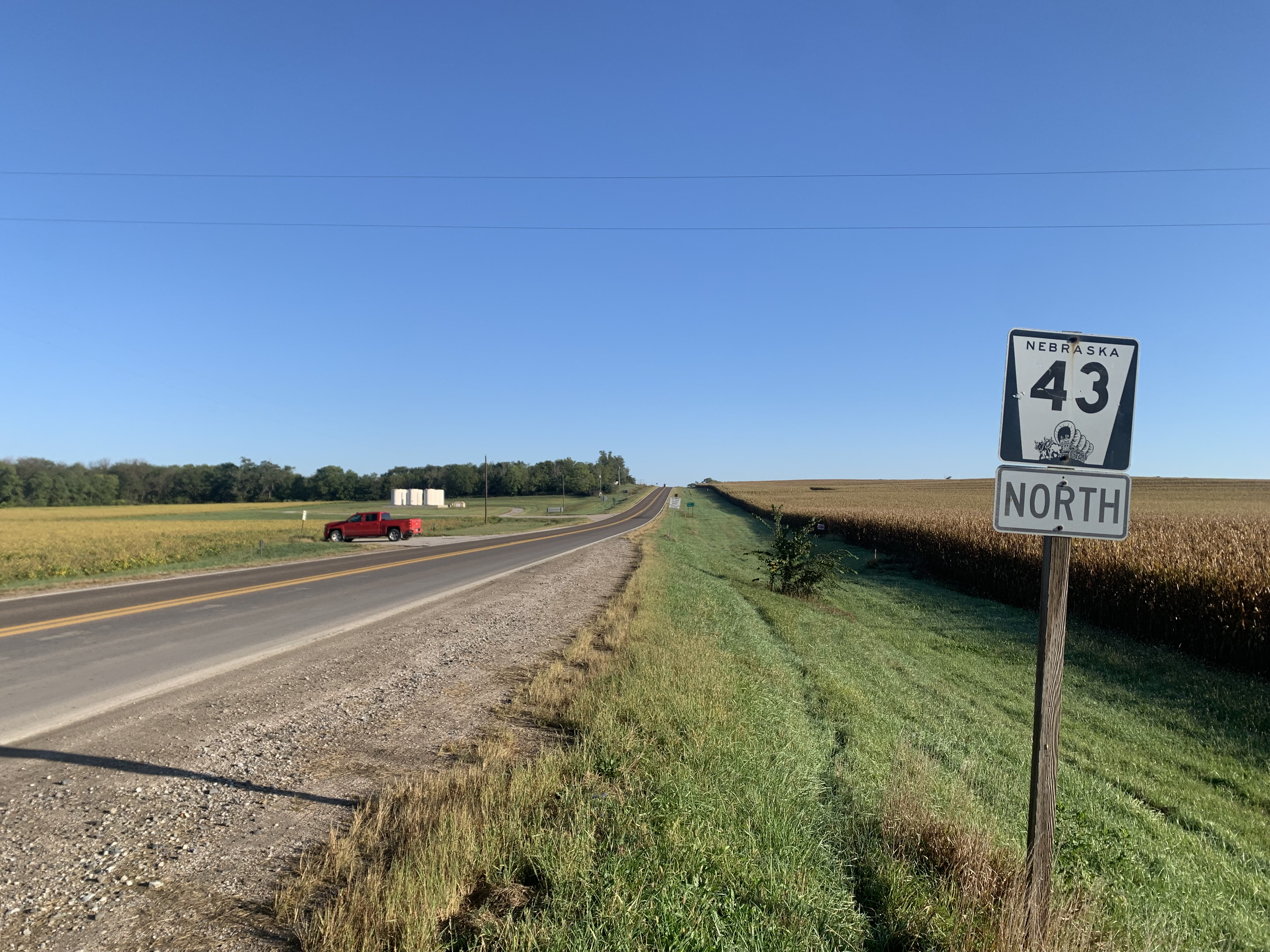
Nebraska Highway 43 in Gage County, Nebraska

Nebraska Highway 43 (N-43) is a highway in southeastern Nebraska. It runs for a length of 30 miles (48 km) in a south-to-north direction. Its southern terminus is near Adams at an intersection with N-41. Its northern terminus is at an intersection with U.S. Highway 34 (US 34) in Eagle.

== Route description ==
Nebraska Highway 43 begins near Adams at an intersection with N-41. The highway heads due north into farmland until Bennet. Shortly after Bennet, the highway meets N-2. N-2 and N-43 overlap until Palmyra, which is where N-43 turns north. N-43 goes north for four miles (6 km), west for one, and then north for three more miles, where it meets US 34 in Eagle and ends.

== Major intersections ==
County	Location	mi	km	Destinations	Notes
Gage		0.00	0.00	N-41	
Lancaster	Panama	9.01	14.50	S-55D west (Panama Road)	
Lancaster		17.07	27.47	N-2 west (Rokeby Road)	Interchange, southern end of N-2 overlap
Otoe	Palmyra	22.40	36.05	N-2 east	Northern end of N-2 overlap
Cass	Eagle	30.22	48.63	US 34 (East O Street)	
1.000 mi = 1.609 km; 1.000 km = 0.621 mi: Concurrency terminus
