= Piattsville, Indiana =

Unincorporated community in Indiana, United States

- Unincorporated community
- Parke County's location in Indiana

- Location in Parke County
- Coordinates: 39°42′16″N 87°07′33″W
- Country: United States
- State: Indiana
- County: Parke
- Township: Adams
- Elevation: 630 ft (192 m)
- Time zone: UTC-5 (Eastern (EST))
  - Summer (DST): UTC-4 (EDT)
- ZIP code: 47872
- Area code: 765
- GNIS feature ID: 452210

Piattsville is an unincorporated community in Adams Township, Parke County, Indiana, United States.

== History ==
A post office was established at Piattsville in 1856, and remained in operation until it was discontinued in 1862. According to Ronald L. Baker, the community bears the name of a settler or family of settlers.

== Geography ==
Piattsville is located at 39°42′16″N 87°07′33″W.
