= Billie Creek Covered Bridge =

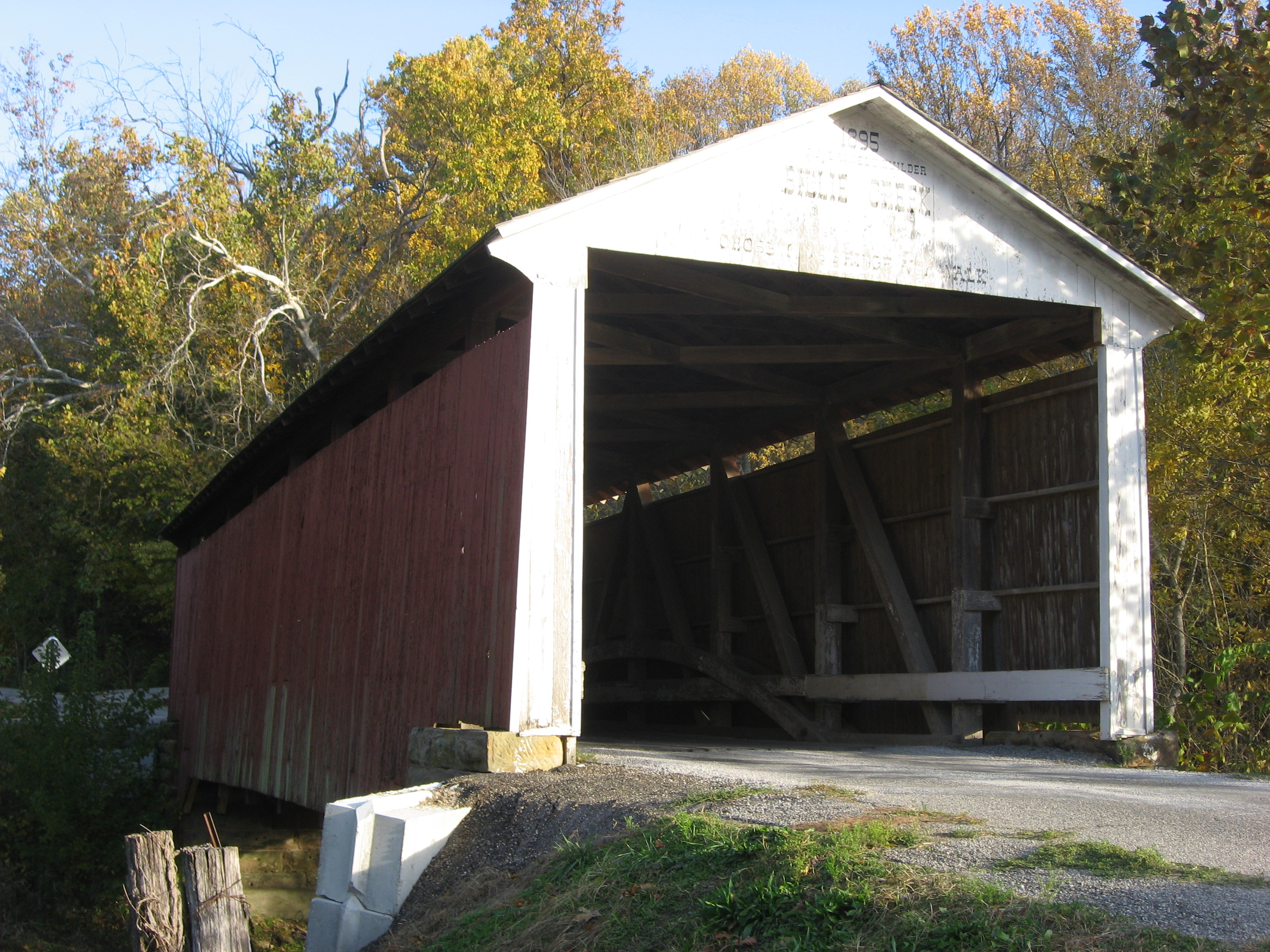
- Western portal and northern side
- Coordinates: 39°45′40.51″N 87°12′23.67″W
- Carries: Old U.S.36
- Crosses: William's Creek
- Locale: East of Rockville in Adams Township, Parke County, Indiana
- Official name: Billie Creek Bridge
- Named for: William's Creek
- Maintained by: Parke County Park Department
- WGCB #: 14-61-19

Characteristics
- Design: Burr arch truss bridge
- Material: Cut sandstone (foundations)
- Trough construction: Wood
- Total length: 78 ft (23.8 m) (includes 8 ft (2.4 m) overhangs on each end)
- Width: 15 ft (4.6 m)
- Longest span: 62 ft (18.9 m)
- No. of spans: 1
- Clearance above: 12.5 ft (3.8 m)

History
- Construction cost: $820
- Billie Creek Covered Bridge (#39)
- U.S. National Register of Historic Places
- U.S. Historic district – Contributing property
- Location within Parke County, Indiana Location within Indiana Location within the United States
- Built: 1895
- Built by: J. J. Daniels
- Website: Billie Creek Covered Bridge (#39)
- Part of: Parke County Covered Bridges TR (ID64000193)
- NRHP reference No.: 78000384
- Added to NRHP: December 22, 1978

Location
- Interactive map of Billie Creek Covered Bridge

The Billie Creek Covered Bridge is a Burr Arch structure in Adams Township, Parke County, Indiana that was built by Joseph J. Daniels in 1895. J.L. Van Fossen supplied the sandstone that makes up the abutments cut from A.E. Fuel's nearby quarry.

== History ==
This bridge was built to replace the open wooden bridge that had been built by famed bridge builder J.A. Britton, just 15 years earlier in 1880. It was built on what was then called the Pikes Peak Ocean to Ocean Highway, what would later become U.S. 36. The bridge was saved because it was later bypassed when the road was rebuilt.

Billie Creek covered bridge was added to the National Register of Historic Places in 1978.

After being bypassed by the main highway it would become a tourist attraction when it became part of Billie Creek Village where it is still open to vehicular traffic and only closed at busy times of the year for traffic control.

== See also ==
- List of Registered Historic Places in Indiana
- Parke County Covered Bridges
- Parke County Covered Bridge Festival
