= Crooks Covered Bridge =

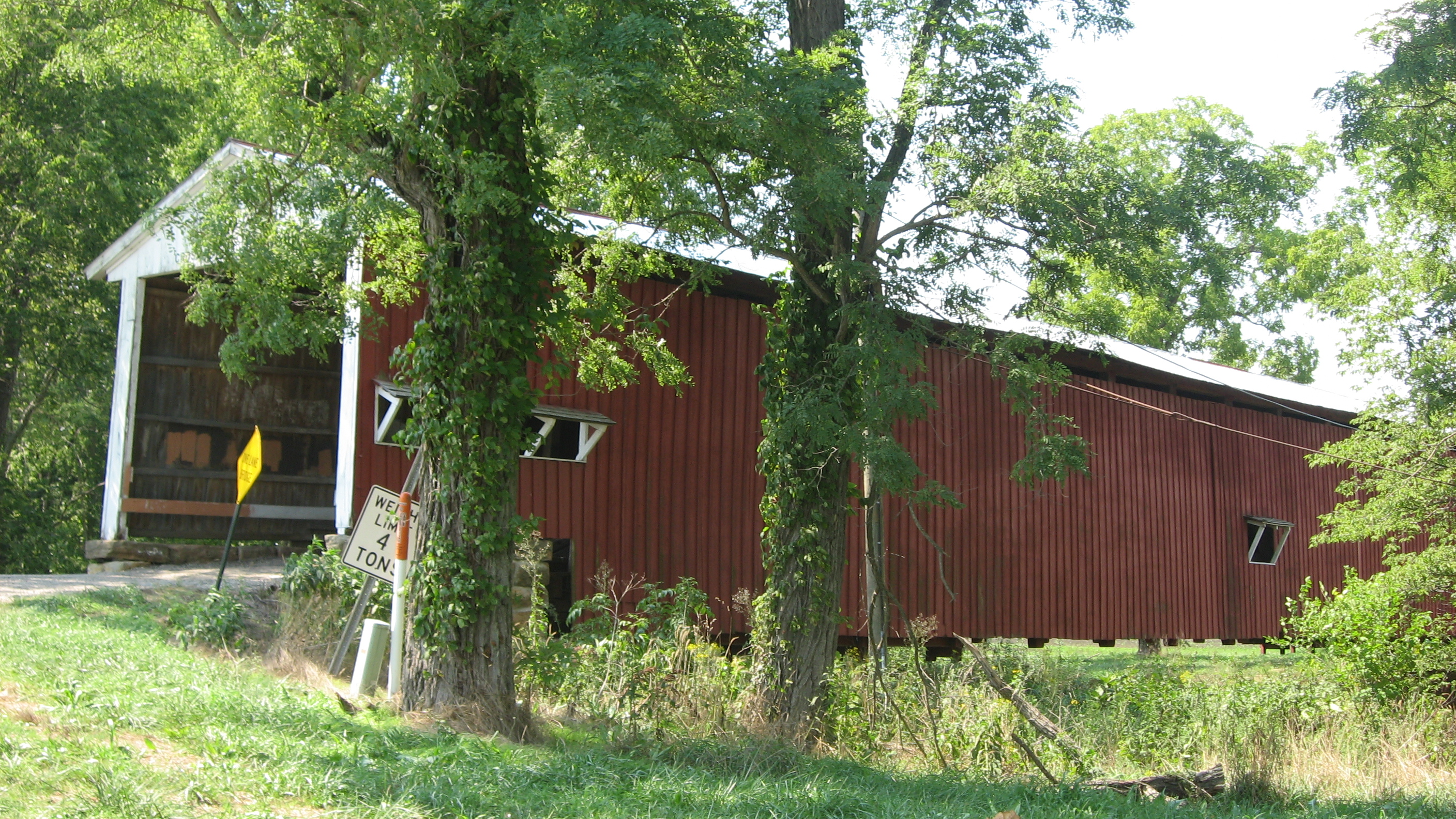
- Crooks Covered Bridge
- Coordinates: 39°43′26.75″N 87°11′22.5″W
- Carries: Crooks Bridge Road (Main road bypasses covered bridge, bridge open to traffic)
- Crosses: Little Raccoon Creek
- Locale: Adams Township, Parke County, Indiana
- Official name: Crooks Covered Bridge
- Other name(s): Walker Adams Bridge, Darroch's Lost Bridge
- Owner: Parke County
- Maintained by: Parke County
- WGCB #: 14-61-17

Characteristics
- Design: Burr arch truss bridge
- Material: Hewn stone (foundations)
- Trough construction: Wood
- Total length: 154 ft (46.9 m) (includes 11 ft (3.4 m) overhangs on each end)
- Width: 14 ft (4.3 m)
- Longest span: 132 ft (40.2 m)
- No. of spans: 1
- Load limit: 4 short tons (3.6 t; 8,000 lb)
- Clearance above: 13 ft (4.0 m)

History
- Construction cost: $1,200 or $5,900
- Rebuilt: 1867 or 1872
- Crooks Covered Bridge (#12)
- U.S. National Register of Historic Places
- U.S. Historic district – Contributing property
- Location within Parke County, Indiana Location within Indiana Location within the United States
- Built: 1856 or 1860
- Built by: Henry Wolf
- Website: Crooks Bridge
- Part of: Parke County Covered Bridges TR (ID64000193)
- NRHP reference No.: 78000391
- Added to NRHP: December 22, 1978

Location
- Interactive map of Crooks Covered Bridge

The Crooks Covered Bridge is a single span Burr Arch Truss structure that crosses Little Raccoon Creek built in 1855–1856 by Henry Wolf just southeast of Rockville, Indiana.

== History ==
The exact history of this bridge has become hazy with the passing of time. A couple of different sources give varying years as to when certain things may have happened; what is consistent is that the bridge was moved from its original location sometime after 1863 maybe due to the road being abandoned. Some claim that the bridge actually washed downstream to its new location where new abutments were put under it and a road built to it. Still others claim that because the creek changed its course the bridge had to be dismantled and moved. Yet another claim is that General Arthur Patterson, one of the founders of Rockville, had the bridge rebuilt by J.J. Daniels in 1867 after a viewing committee, which included Daniels, recommended it be rebuilt. Daniels also recommended moving the bridge to the Darroch's Site because it was thought to be safe from flooding. This proved false though when the bridge had to be repaired in 1875 after being damaged by flooding.

It was added to the National Register of Historic Places in 1978.

== Gallery ==
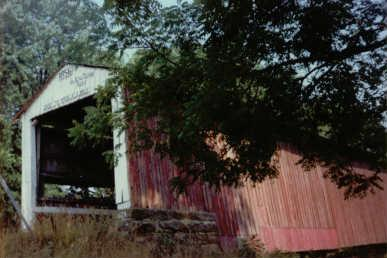

== See also ==
- List of Registered Historic Places in Indiana
- Parke County Covered Bridges
- Parke County Covered Bridge Festival
