= Billie Creek Village =

Living history museum and park in Parke County, Indiana, U.S.

Billie Creek Village is a 70-acre open-air living history museum and park, filled with 38 historical buildings and structures, and hundreds of antiques and artifacts. It is located at 39.7614298°N 87.2019582°W near Rockville, Adams Township, Parke County, Indiana in the area known as the "Covered Bridge Capital of the World" for the county's 31 covered bridges. It was formed in 1964/1965 by residents of Parke County, and opened its doors in 1969. The group Parke County, Inc. helped to form it, and a separate group, Billie Creek Village, Inc, was formed for operating it. The village took its name from nearby Williams Creek.

The buildings are from the turn of the century and range from an 1830s Log Cabin to the 1913 Schoolhouse.

The Billie Creek Inn sits across the road, and as of 2012, is separate from Billie Creek Village. It currently operates under the name Royal Inn.

== Covered bridges at Billie Creek Village ==
The three covered bridges are on the National Register of Historic Places

- Beeson Covered Bridge

Burr Arch design built in 1906

- Billie Creek Covered Bridge

Burr Arch design built in 1895

- Leatherwood Station Covered Bridge

Burr Arch design built in 1899

== Historical buildings at Billie Creek Village ==
- Beeson-DePlanty Cabin - built in 1830s
- Billie Creek Village General Store
- Billie Creek Village Bank - former pre-1900 post office
- Blacksmith shop
- Burr Mill
- Chautaqua Pavilion
- Covered Bridge Courier Office - print shop -
- Dr. Rice's Office - built mid-1800s
- Farmstead with log barn
- Gaebler Building - built pre-1904
- Governor Wright home
- Machinery Shed
- Maple Syrup Camp
- Refreshment Stand - built 1911
- Schoolhouse
- Sorghum Mill and Cider Shack
- St. Joseph's Catholic Church - built 1886
- Union Baptist Church

== Events at Billie Creek ==
- School Days In May
- Parke County Covered Bridge Bike Tour - May
- Parke County Covered Bridge Festival - October
- Civil War Days - July
- Ice Cream Social - 4 July
- Steam Harvest Days - sponsored by The Antique Power Association - September

== Demise and Reopening ==
Billie Creek Village had funding issues more than once, and for several years. In 2012, the site was offered for auction with a bid in the range of $800,000 - $1.5 million. The next step was to divide the site into multiple parcels and listings to sell it piece-meal.

In the summer of 2014, Billie Creek Village reopened with a Grand Reopening occurring on August 10, 2014. This revival did not last and it was again closed.

Operational Management was purchased by Gregg Larson in April 2022. It is under this new management that Billie Creek is yet again open to the public for events and daily exploration through the village.
