= Adams Township, Gage County, Nebraska =

Adams Township
- Township
- Location in Gage County
- Coordinates: 40°28′29″N 096°30′40″W
- Country: United States
- State: Nebraska
- County: Gage

Area
  - Total: 34.33 sq mi (88.91 km^{2})
  - Land: 34.08 sq mi (88.26 km^{2})
  - Water: 0.25 sq mi (0.65 km^{2}) 0.73%
- Elevation: 1,289 ft (393 m)

Population (2020)
  - Total: 937 ▲
  - Density: 27.5/sq mi (10.6/km^{2})
- GNIS feature ID: 0837843

Adams Township is one of twenty-four townships in Gage County, Nebraska, United States. The population was 937 at the 2020 census. A 2021 estimate placed the township's population at 950.

The Village of Adams lies within the Township.
