= Catlin Covered Bridge =

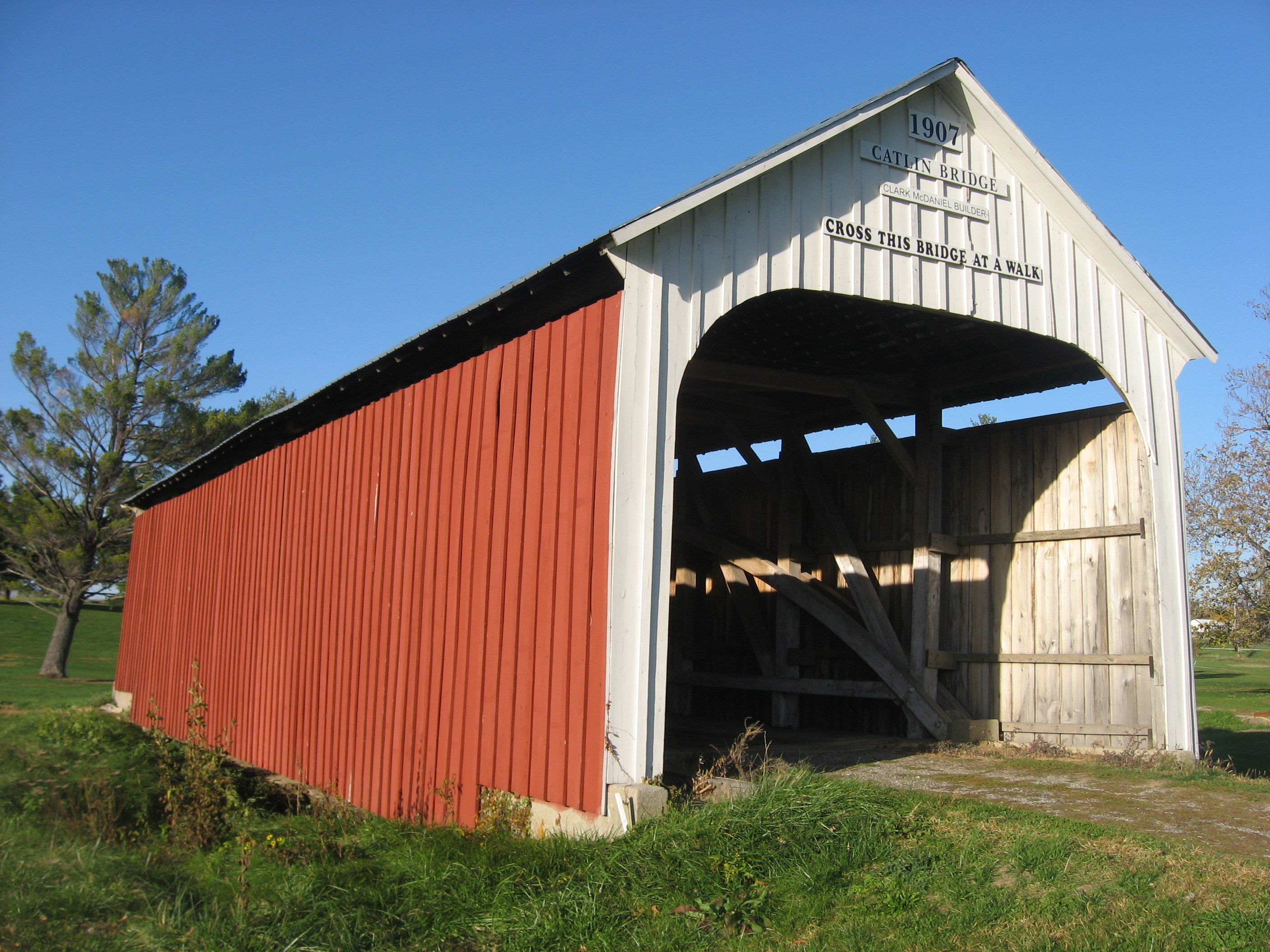
- Catlin Covered Bridge
- Coordinates: 39°47′29.93″N 87°14′17.31″W
- Carries: Pedestrian traffic (Not open to vehicular traffic)
- Crosses: Bill Diddle Creek
- Locale: Rockville Golf Course, Rockville, Indiana
- Official name: Catlin Bridge
- Named for: Catlin, Indiana
- WGCB #: 14-61-15

Characteristics
- Design: Burr arch truss bridge
- Material: Concrete (foundations)
- Trough construction: Wood
- Total length: 72 ft (21.9 m) (includes 9 ft (2.7 m) overhangs on each end)
- Width: 16 ft (4.9 m)
- Longest span: 54 ft (16.5 m)
- No. of spans: 1
- Clearance above: 13 ft (4.0 m)
- Catlin Covered Bridge (#13)
- U.S. National Register of Historic Places
- U.S. Historic district – Contributing property
- Location within Parke County, Indiana Location within Indiana Location within the United States
- Built: 1907
- Built by: Clark McDaniel
- Website: Catlin Bridge
- Part of: Parke County Covered Bridges TR (ID64000193)
- NRHP reference No.: 78000387
- Added to NRHP: December 22, 1978

Location
- Interactive map of Catlin Covered Bridge

The Catlin Covered Bridge is a single span Burr Arch truss covered bridge structure in Rockville, Indiana that was built by Clark McDaniel in 1907.

== History ==
Originally it was located on the Rockville–Rosedale Road on the north side of Caitlin crossing Sunderland Creek. This road had originally been a major route to Crawfordsville, even having the title the "Ben Hur Highway", for General Lew Wallace who was a famous Crawfordsville resident and author of the famous novel Ben Hur. Even after US Highway 41 was completed heavy agricultural truck traffic continued to use the bridge. This led the bridge being condemned in the late 1950s, and closed. After the bridge was closed, it fell into a severe state of disrepair. Funds were raised to save the valuable covered bridge and it was relocated to its present spot, at the Rockville Golf Course, in 1961 by Garrard Brothers Trucking where it crosses Bill Diddle Creek.

It was added to the National Register of Historic Places in 1978.

== Gallery ==
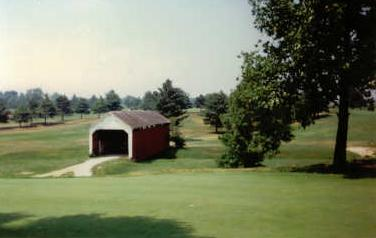

== See also ==
- List of Registered Historic Places in Indiana
- Parke County Covered Bridges
- Parke County Covered Bridge Festival
