= Leatherwood Station Covered Bridge =

Place in Indiana listed on National Register of Historic Places

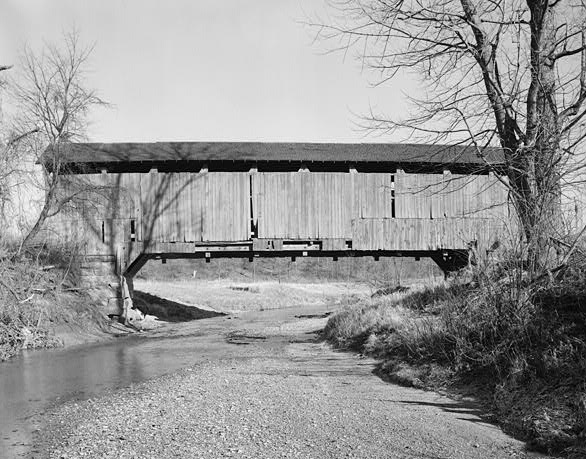
- Coordinates: 39°45′27.58″N 87°12′33.05″W
- Carries: Walking trail
- Crosses: Williams Creek (Indiana)
- Locale: Rockport, Parke County, Indiana, United States
- Official name: Leatherwood Station Covered Bridge
- Other name: Harry Wolf Bridge
- Named for: Leatherwood Station
- Maintained by: Parke County Commissioners; Parke County
- WGCB #: 14-61-25

Characteristics
- Design: Burr arch truss bridge
- Total length: 72 ft (21.9 m) (includes 9 ft (2.7 m) overhangs on each end)
- Width: 16 ft (4.9 m)
- No. of spans: 1
- Clearance above: 14 ft (4.3 m)

History
- Construction cost: <$680
- Leatherwood Station Covered Bridge (#25)
- U.S. National Register of Historic Places
- U.S. Historic district – Contributing property
- Location within Parke County, Indiana Location within Indiana Location within the United States
- Built: 1899
- Built by: Joseph A. Britton
- Website: Leatherwood Station Bridge
- Part of: Parke County Covered Bridges TR (ID64000193)
- NRHP reference No.: 78000397
- Added to NRHP: December 22, 1978

Location
- Interactive map of Leatherwood Station Covered Bridge

The Leatherwood Station Covered Bridge is a single span double Burr Arch Truss covered bridge structure that was built by Joseph A. Britton & Son in 1899. Originally it had sandstone abutments but when it was moved to Billie Creek Village they were replaced with concrete abutments with sandstone showing.

== History ==
The bridge was named after the nearby B&O Railroad station at its original location (39.815141°N 87.299085°W). It was also known as the "Harry Wolf Bridge." Wolf owned the land near the bridge. The portal was later modified into a J. J. Daniels Arch while the original angular Britton Arch framing is still visible from the inside.

A letter from J. J. Daniels dated May 18, 1899, says that he had made a bid to build the bridge for $680. Since J. A. Britton was awarded the contract it can be assumed that his bid was less than Daniels.

According to Historic American Engineering Record documentation of the bridge, it was repaired in 1940 by the Works Progress Administration. It was built by Britton who built approximately 40 bridges in three Indiana counties, Parke, Putnam, and Vermillion, during a 33-year period.

It was added to the National Register of Historic Places in 1978.

== Gallery ==
Images of Leatherwood Station Covered Bridge prior to being moved to Billie Creek Village.

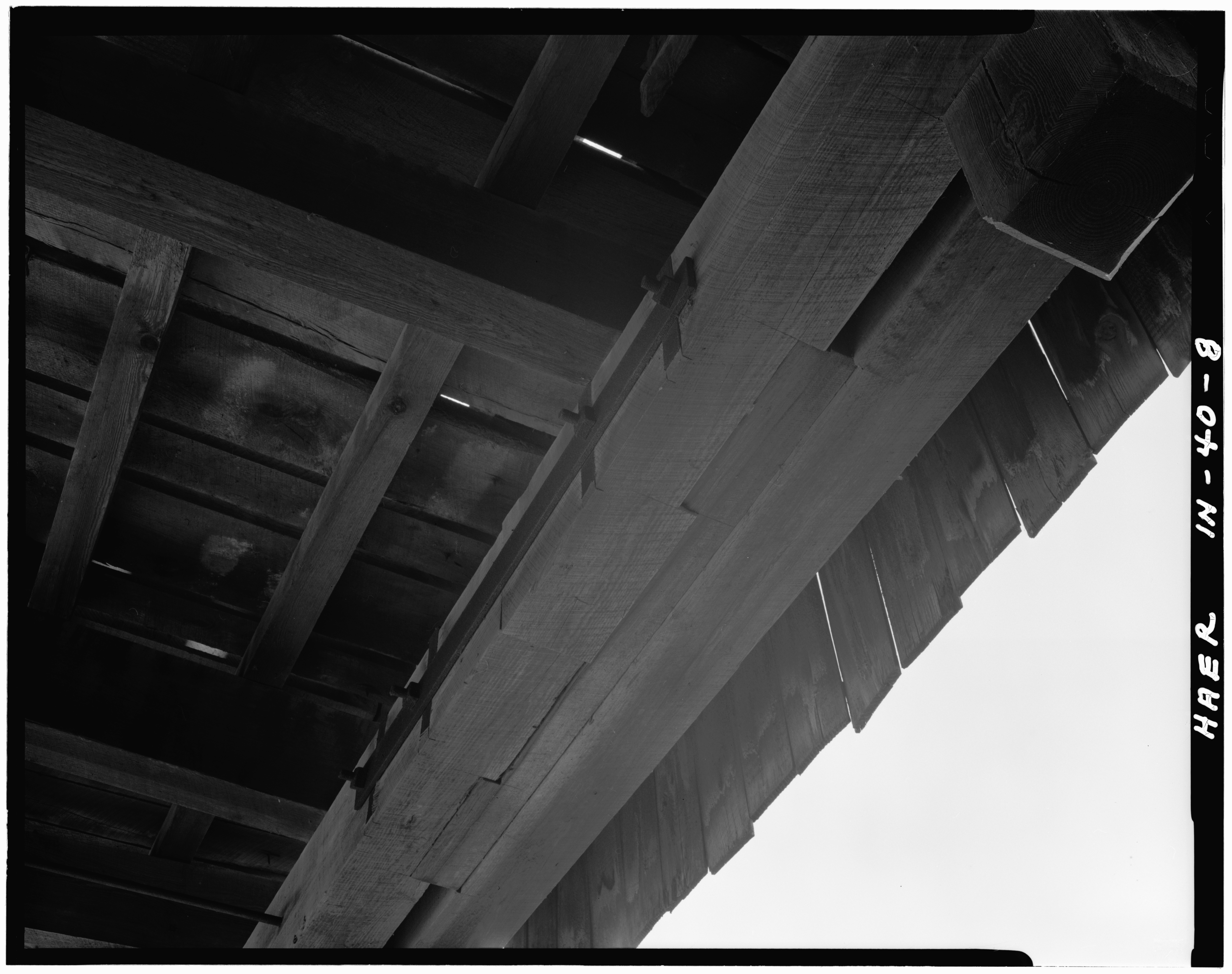
Detail of splice in lower chord underneath bridge

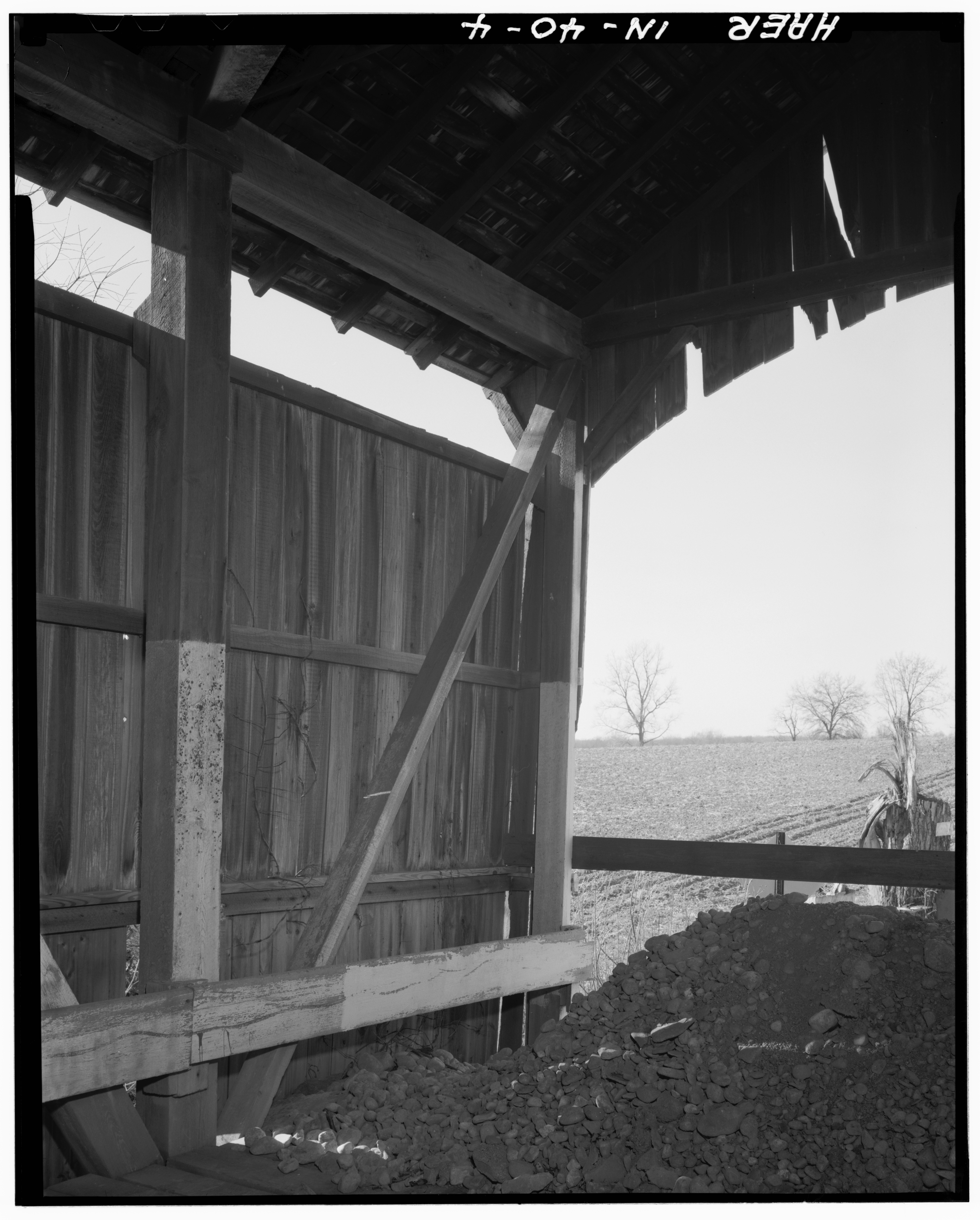
Detail of Northwest portal entrance bracing

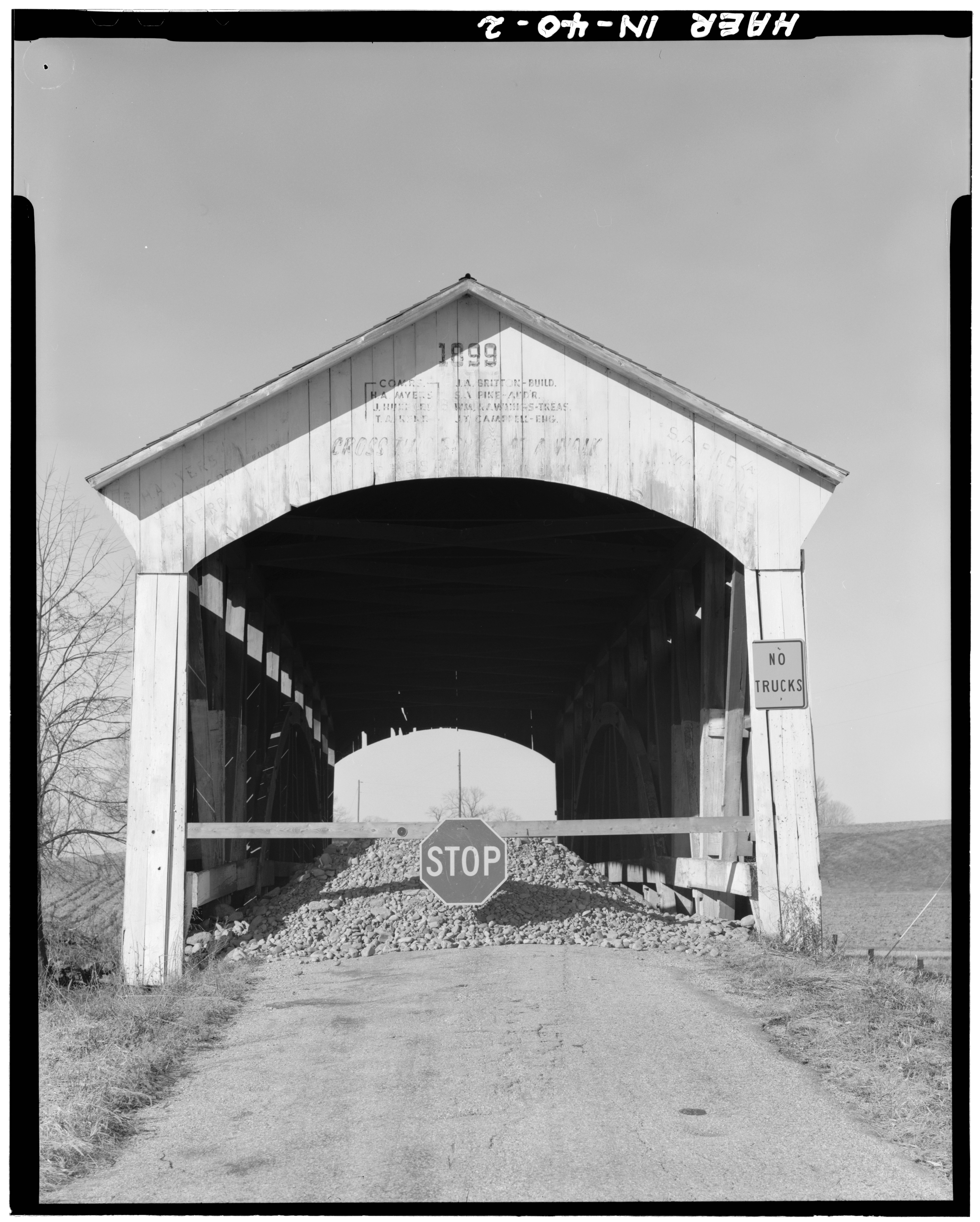
Exterior view of Southeast portal entrance

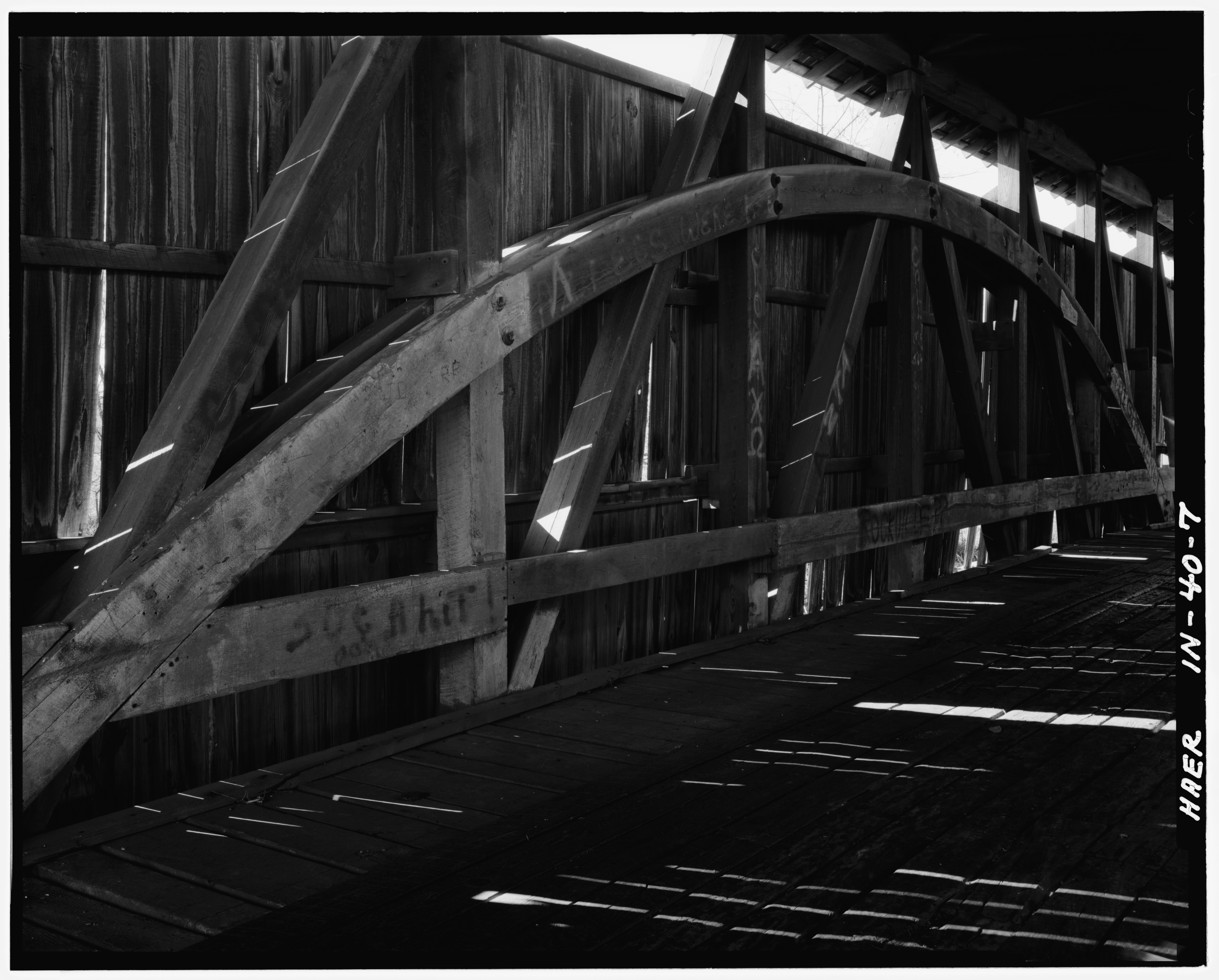
Detail of Double Burr Arch

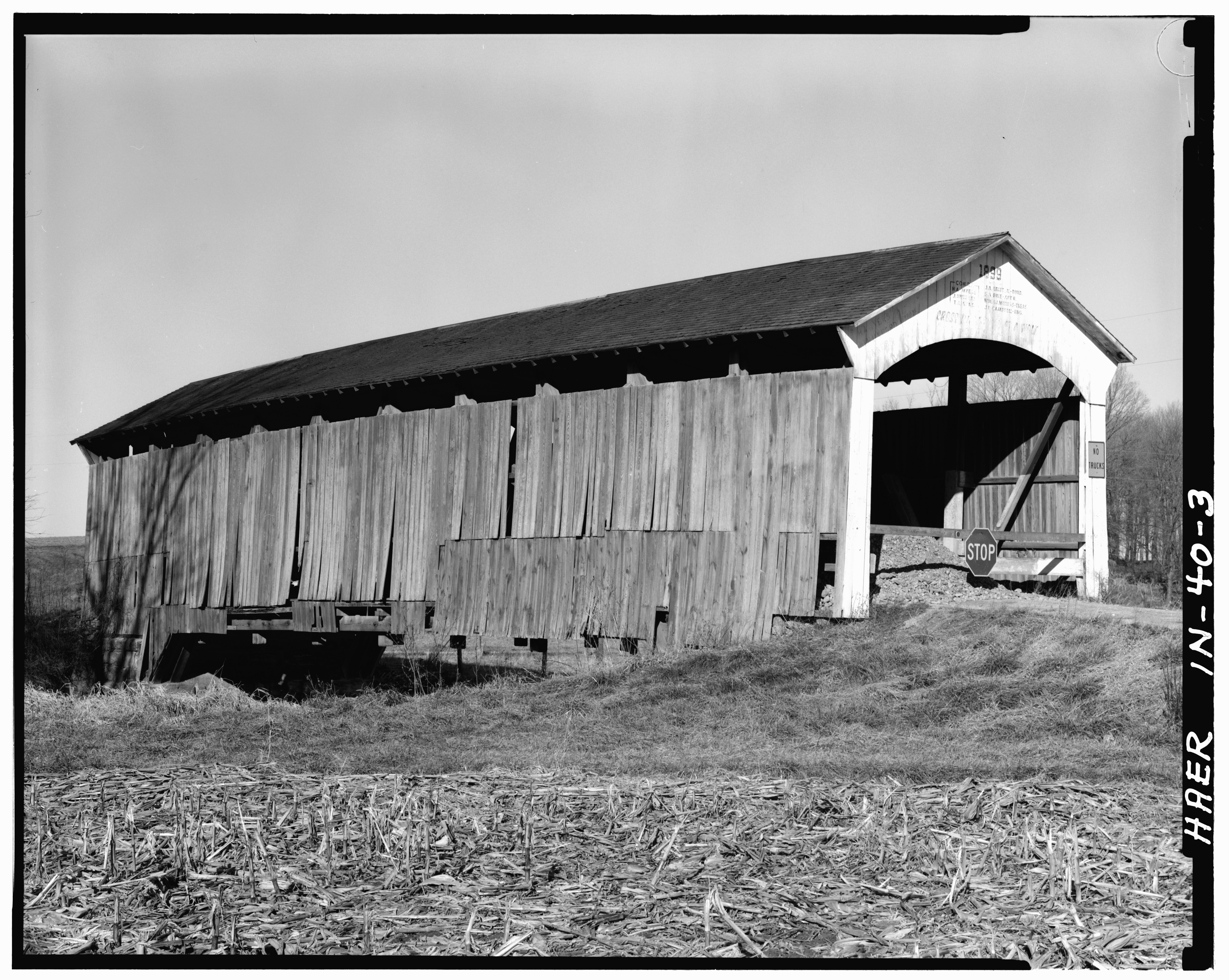
South 3/4 view

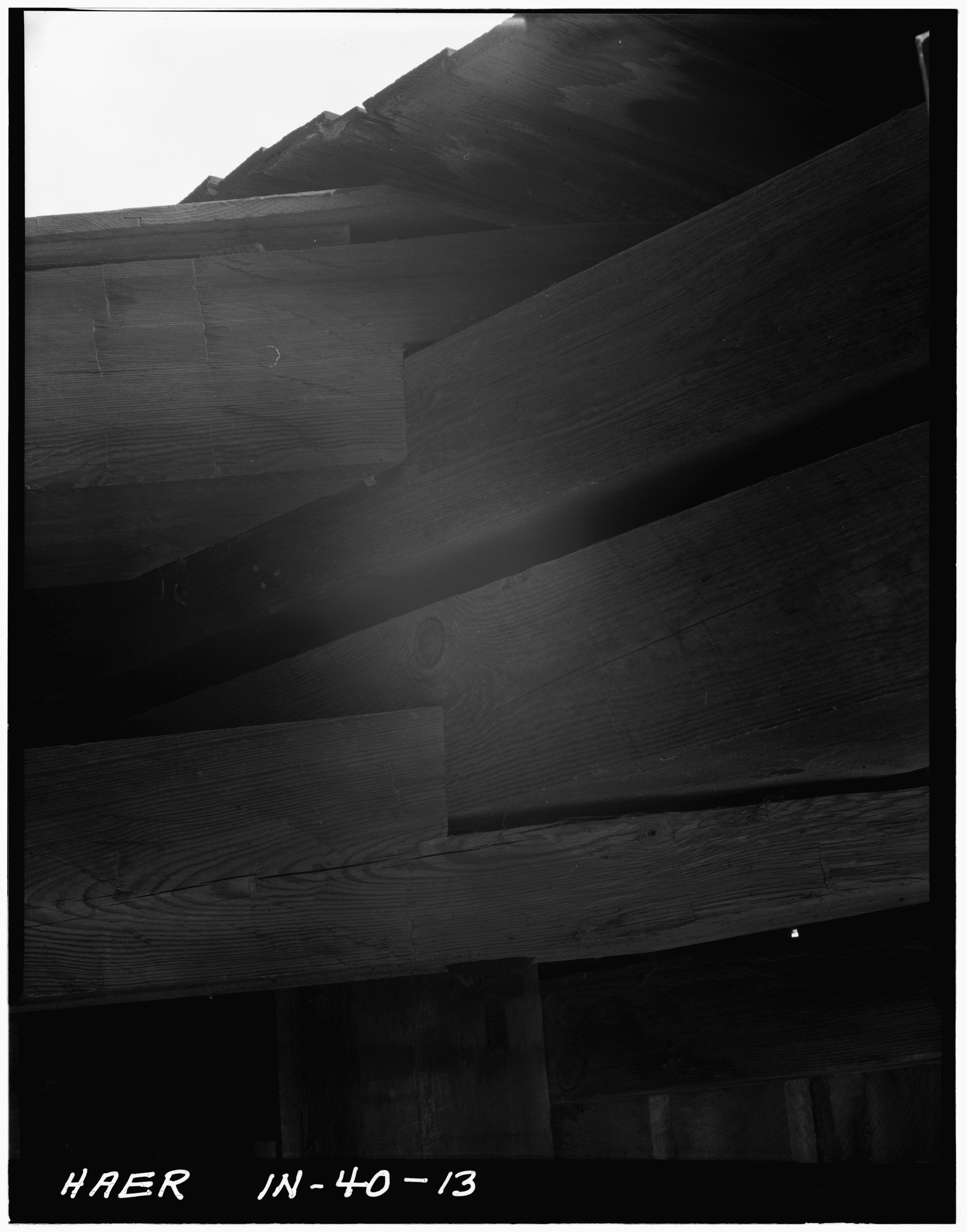
Detail of lower chord passing through double Burr Arch rings, viewed from below bridge (Note kerfs in arches)

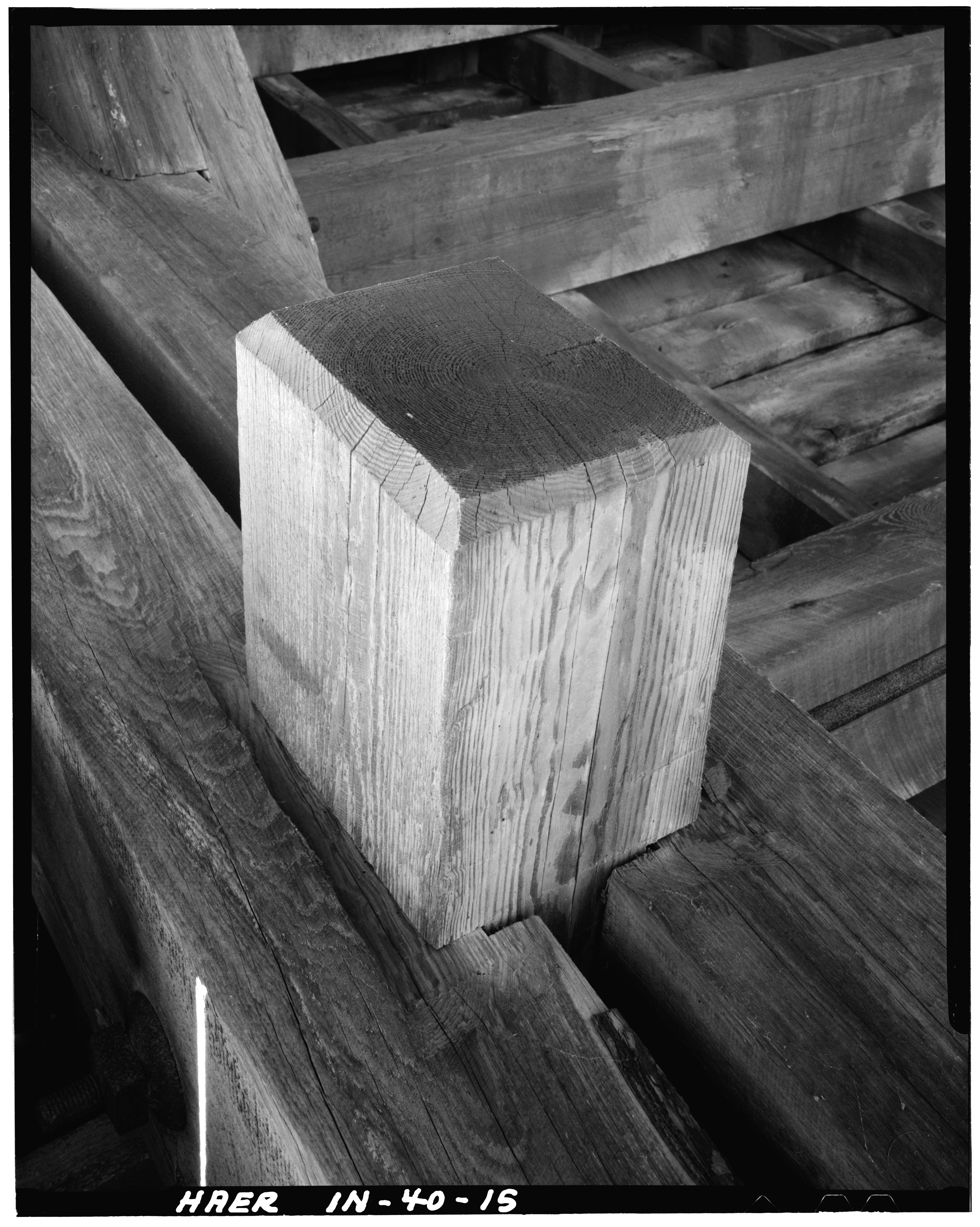
Detail of vertical King Post connection with lower chord, viewed from below with picture flipped 180 (Note kerfs in lower chord)

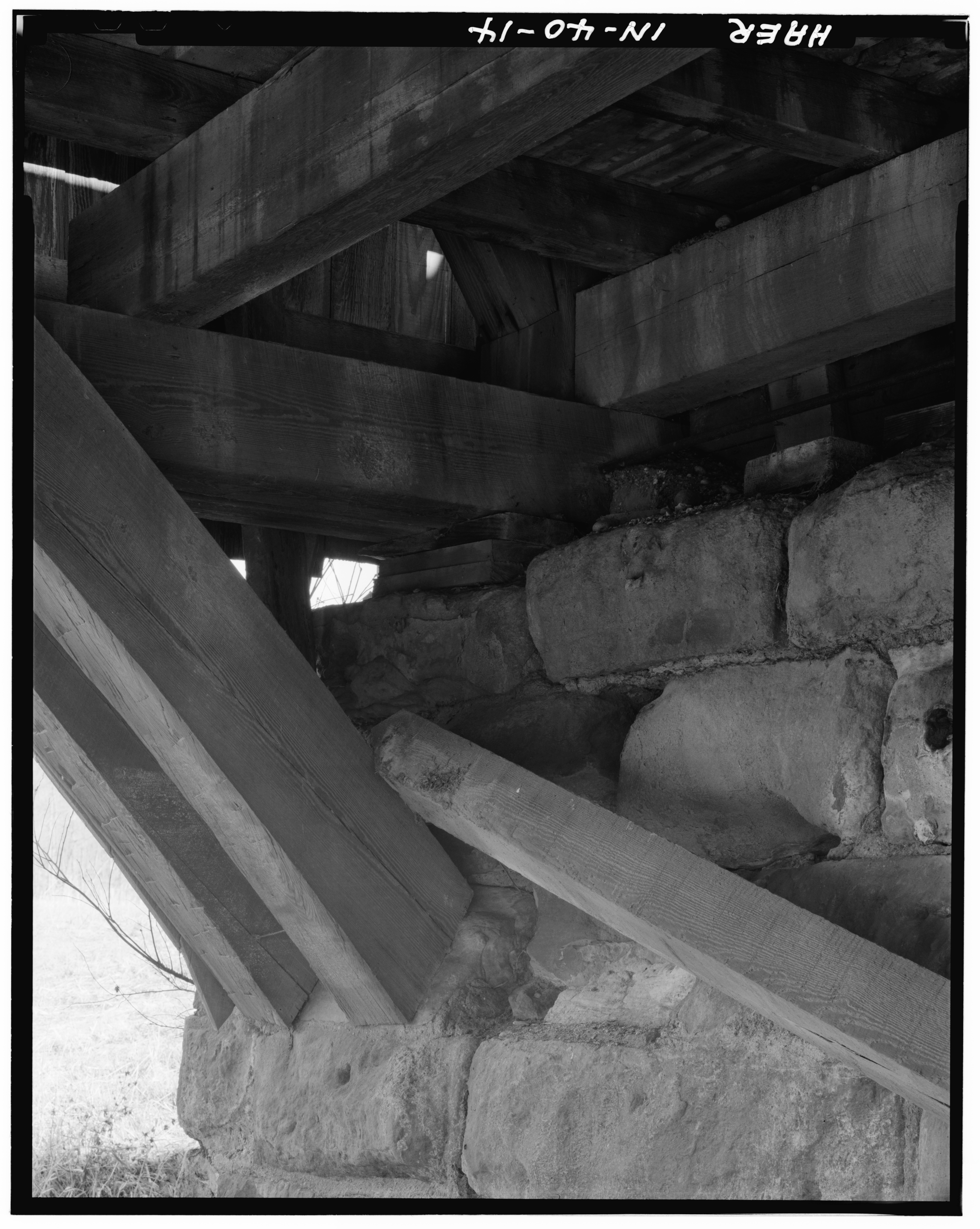
Detail of double Burr Arch ring bearing on stone abutment, truss and lower chord

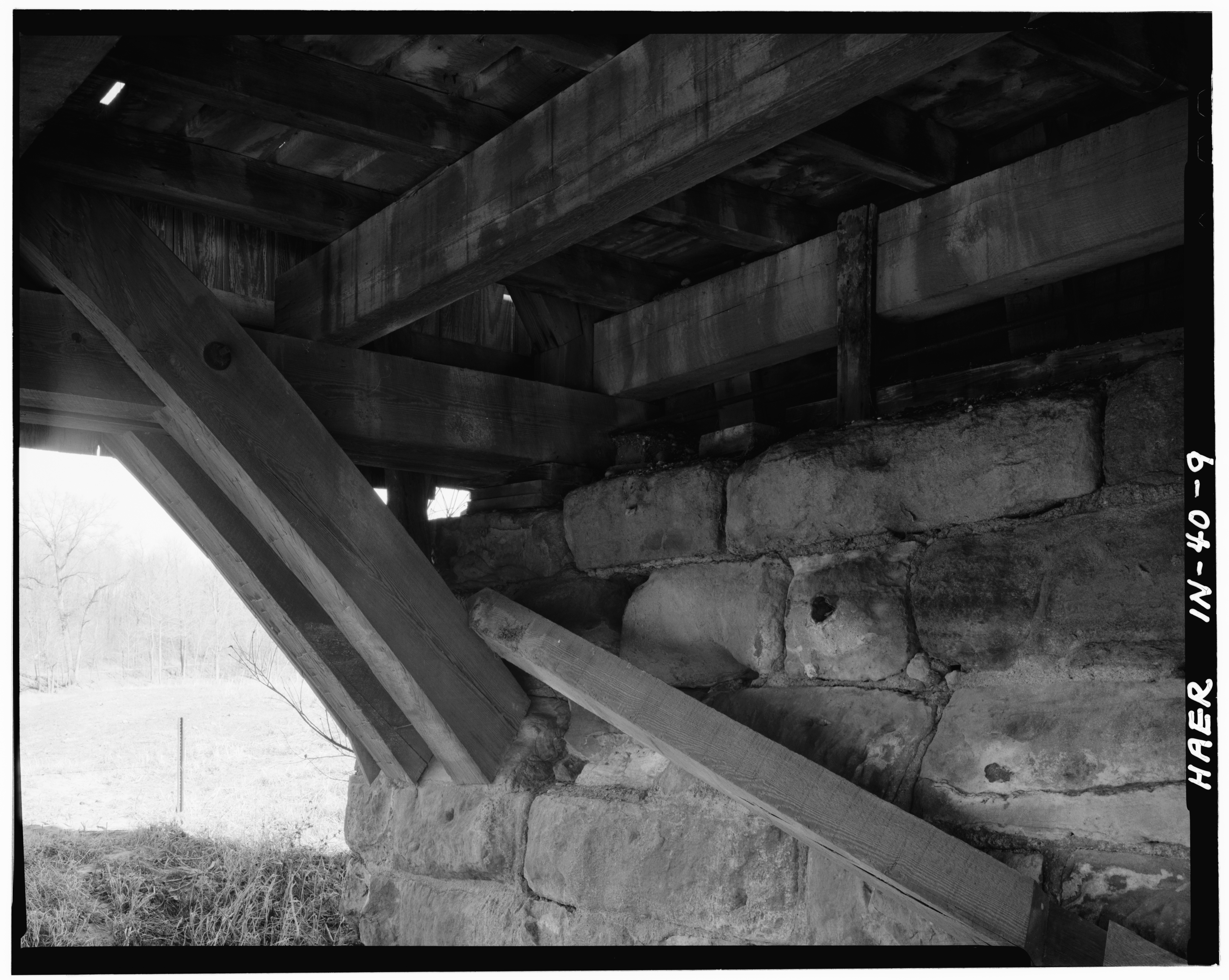
Detail of double Burr Arch ring bearing on stone abutment, truss and lower chord

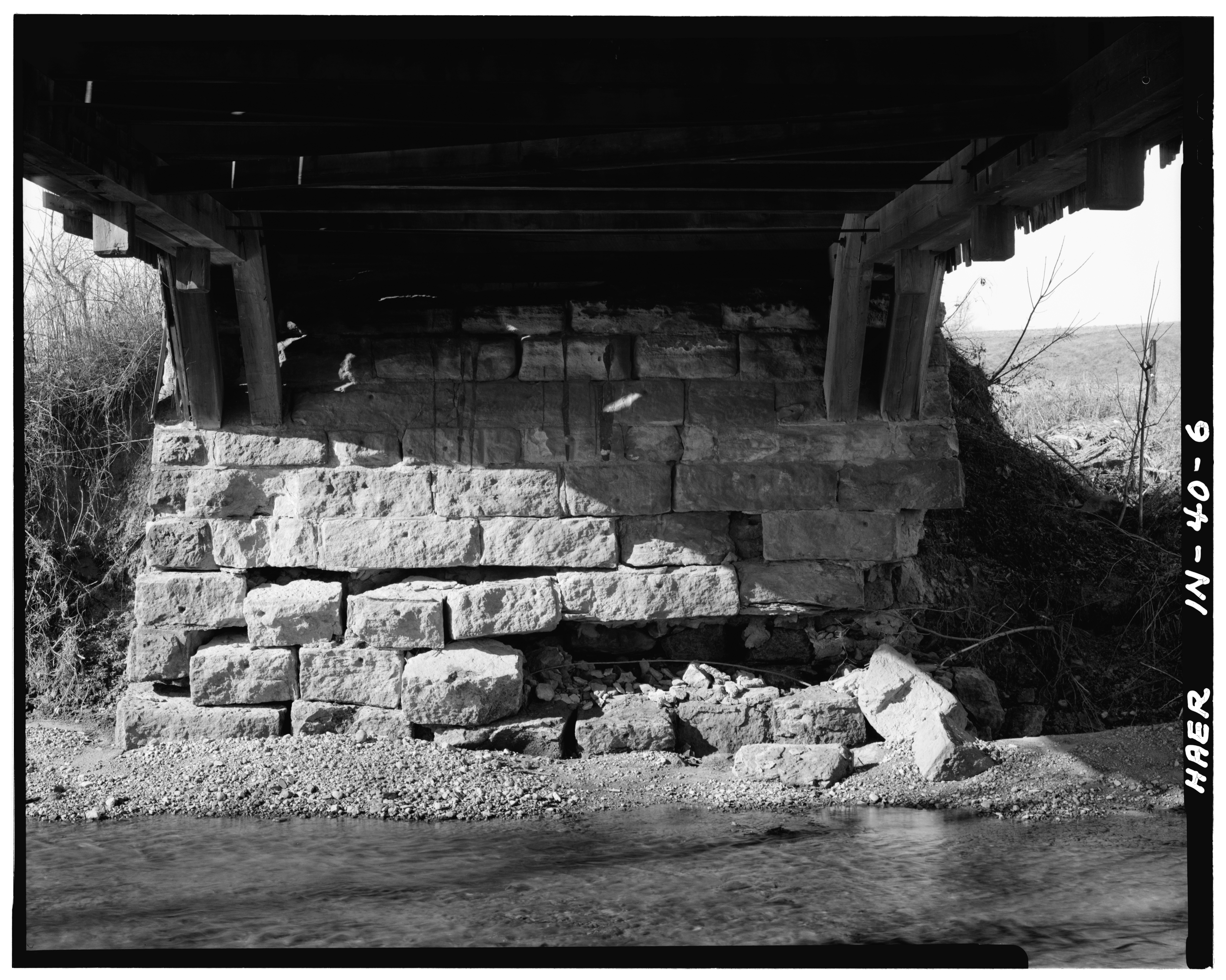
View of abutment from under bridge: Detail of both double Burr Arches beating on stone abutment (Note damage to abutment)

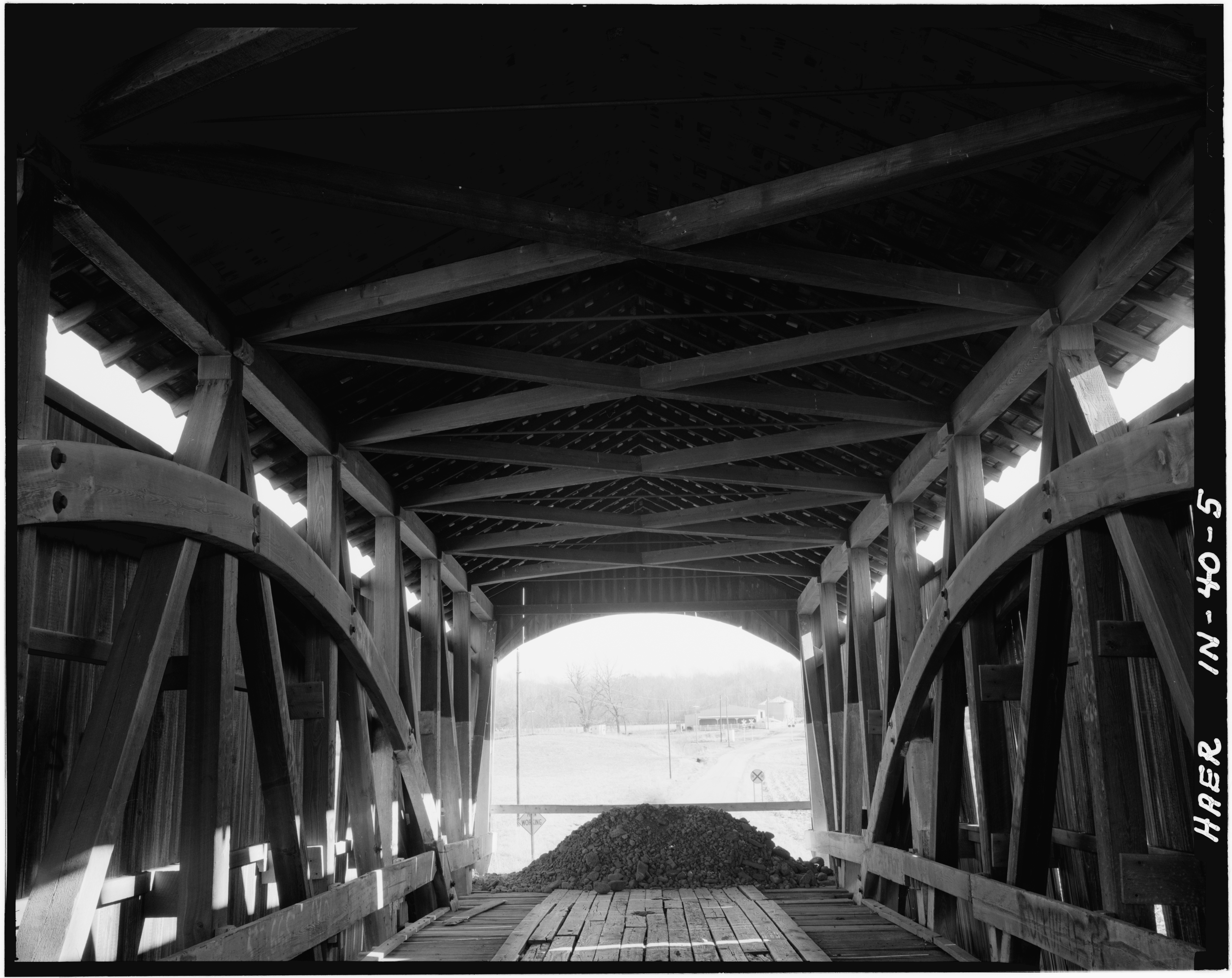
View from inside bridge, looking Southeast, showing upper wind bracing and ties, double Burr Arch rings, and truss framing

== See also ==
- List of bridges documented by the Historic American Engineering Record in Indiana
- List of Registered Historic Places in Indiana
- Parke County Covered Bridges
- Parke County Covered Bridge Festival
