= Adams Township, Grant County, South Dakota =

Adams Township, South Dakota
- Township
- Location within South Dakota Location within the United States
- Coordinates: 45°1′16″N 96°32′21″W
- Country: United States
- State: South Dakota
- County: Grant

Area
  - Total: 54.5 sq mi (141.2 km^{2})
  - Land: 54.5 sq mi (141.2 km^{2})
  - Water: 0 sq mi (0.0 km^{2})
- Elevation: 1,194 ft (364 m)

Population (2000)
  - Total: 169
  - Density: 3.1/sq mi (1.2/km^{2})
- Time zone: UTC-6 (Central (CST))
  - Summer (DST): UTC-5 (CDT)
- Area code: 605
- FIPS code: 46-00260
- GNIS feature ID: 1268520

Adams Township is a township in Grant County, South Dakota, United States.
