= Adams Township, Wapello County, Iowa =

Township in Wapello County, Iowa, U.S.

Coordinates: 40.9431°N 92.5820°W

Adams Township is a township in Wapello County, Iowa, United States.

== History ==
Adams Township was organized in 1844. It was named for Judge James F. Adams, a pioneer settler.
