= Adams Township, Dallas County, Iowa =

Adams Township
- Township
- Location in Dallas County
- Coordinates: 41°33′24″N 094°04′09″W
- Country: United States
- State: Iowa
- County: Dallas

Area
  - Total: 39.86 sq mi (103.24 km^{2})
  - Land: 39.83 sq mi (103.17 km^{2})
  - Water: 0.027 sq mi (0.07 km^{2}) 0.07%
- Elevation: 942 ft (287 m)

Population (2000)
  - Total: 1,082
  - Density: 27/sq mi (10.5/km^{2})
- GNIS feature ID: 0467372

Adams Township is a township in Dallas County, Iowa, United States. As of the 2000 census, its population was 1,082.

== History ==
Adams Township is named for Stephen Adams, who was instrumental in the organization of this township.

== Geography ==
Adams Township covers an area of 39.86 square miles (103.2 km^{2}) and contains a portion of the city of De Soto on the township's eastern border.

=== Streams ===
Bear Creek, Coal Creek and Panther Creek run through this township.

=== Cemeteries ===
According to the USGS, Adams Township contains four cemeteries: Ellis, Longmire, McKibben, and Panther Creek.

=== Major highways ===
- U.S. Route 169
- Interstate 80
