= Adams Township, Miner County, South Dakota =

Adams Township, South Dakota
- Township
- Location within South Dakota Location within the United States
- Coordinates: 44°4′24″N 97°32′26″W
- Country: United States
- State: South Dakota
- County: Miner

Area
  - Total: 36.0 sq mi (93.2 km^{2})
  - Land: 36.0 sq mi (93.2 km^{2})
  - Water: 0 sq mi (0.0 km^{2})
- Elevation: 1,578 ft (481 m)

Population (2000)
  - Total: 125
  - Density: 3.4/sq mi (1.3/km^{2})
- Time zone: UTC-6 (Central (CST))
  - Summer (DST): UTC-5 (CDT)
- Area code: 605
- FIPS code: 46-00300
- GNIS feature ID: 1267727

Adams Township is a township in Miner County, South Dakota, United States. It is serviced by the zip code 57349.
