= Adams Township, Keokuk County, Iowa =

Township in Keokuk County, Iowa, U.S.

Coordinates: 42°28′N 92°14′W

Adams Township is a township in Keokuk County, Iowa, United States.
