= Adams, Nebraska =

- Village
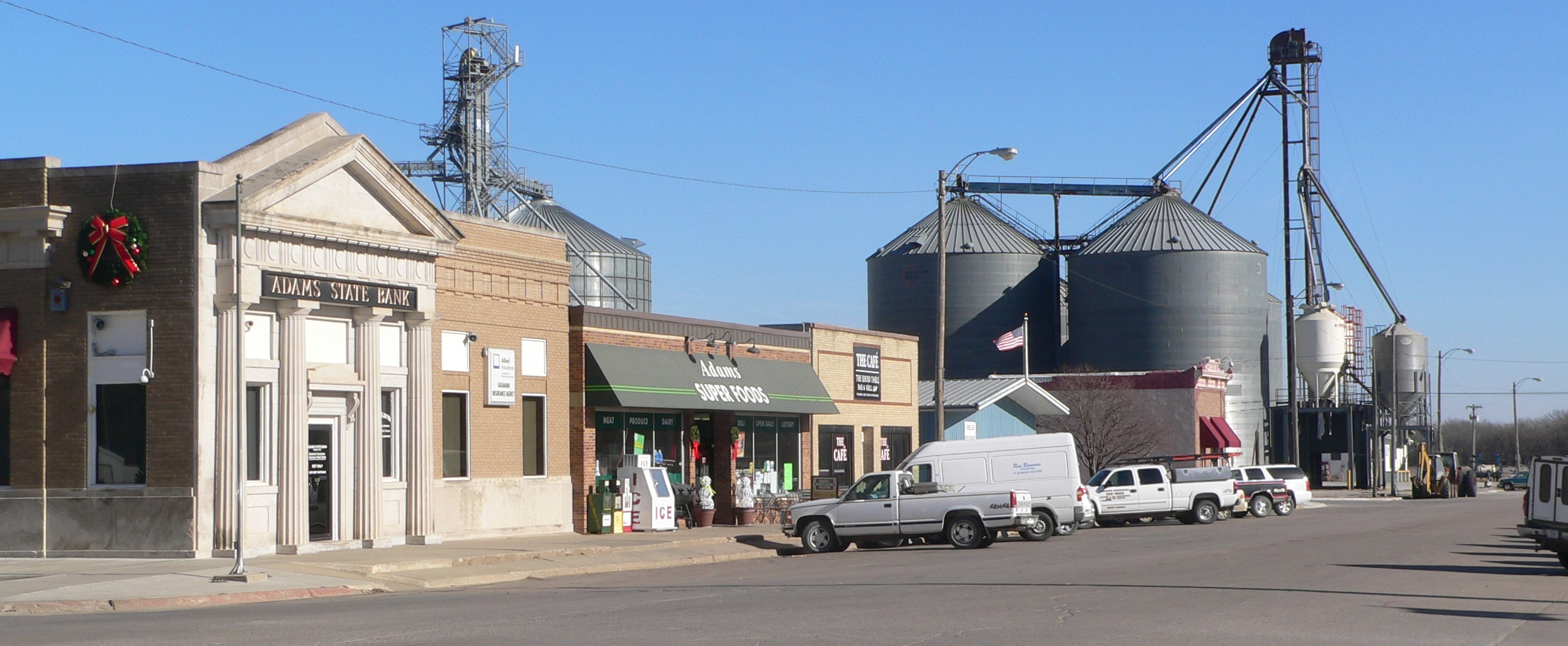
- Downtown Adams: Main Street

- Location of Adams, Nebraska

- Location within Nebraska Location within the United States
- Coordinates: 40°27′29″N 96°30′27″W
- Country: United States
- State: Nebraska
- County: Gage
- Township: Adams

Area
  - Total: 0.59 sq mi (1.54 km^{2})
  - Land: 0.59 sq mi (1.54 km^{2})
  - Water: 0 sq mi (0.00 km^{2})
- Elevation: 1,247 ft (380 m)

Population (2020)
  - Total: 604
  - Density: 1,016/sq mi (392.2/km^{2})
- Time zone: UTC-6 (Central (CST))
  - Summer (DST): UTC-5 (CDT)
- ZIP code: 68301
- Area code: 402
- FIPS code: 31-00240
- GNIS feature ID: 2397908
- Website: www.villageofadamsnebraska.com

Adams is a village in Gage County, Nebraska, United States. The population was 604 at the 2020 census.

== History ==
The area that would become the village of Adams was initially colonized by the namesake of the settlement, an Indiana pioneer named Tyler Adams (1808–1887). He arrived in 1857; however, the village of Adams did not exist until John O. Adams negotiated deals with a railroad company that intended to set tracks through his land in 1873.

== Geography ==
According to the United States Census Bureau, the village has a total area of 0.58 square miles (1.50 km^{2}), all land. The village lies approximately twenty-five miles south of the state capital city of Lincoln.

=== Climate ===
Climate data for Adams, Nebraska (coordinates:40.4519°N 96.5103°W, 1991-2020)
Month	Jan	Feb	Mar	Apr	May	Jun	Jul	Aug	Sep	Oct	Nov	Dec	Year
Average precipitation inches (mm)	0.74 (19)	1.05 (27)	2.17 (55)	2.97 (75)	5.41 (137)	4.84 (123)	3.40 (86)	3.39 (86)	3.55 (90)	2.60 (66)	1.34 (34)	1.02 (26)	32.48 (824)
Average precipitation days (≥ 0.01 in)	4.9	5	6.6	8.9	11.3	10.2	9.6	9	7.8	6.7	4.8	4.8	89.6
Source: NOAA

== Demographics ==
Historical population
Census	Pop.	Note	%±
1880	52		—
1900	417		—
1910	647		55.2%
1920	574		−11.3%
1930	535		−6.8%
1940	516		−3.6%
1950	457		−11.4%
1960	387		−15.3%
1970	463		19.6%
1980	395		−14.7%
1990	472		19.5%
2000	489		3.6%
2010	573		17.2%
2020	604		5.4%
U.S. Decennial Census

=== 2010 census ===
As of the census of 2010, there were 573 people, 197 households, and 141 families residing in the village. The population density was 987.9 inhabitants per square mile (381.4/km^{2}). There were 217 housing units at an average density of 374.1 per square mile (144.4/km^{2}). The racial makeup of the village was 99.7% White, 0.2% Asian, and 0.2% from two or more races. Hispanic or Latino people of any race were 0.7% of the population.

There were 197 households, of which 38.6% had children under the age of 18 living with them, 53.8% were married couples living together, 11.2% had a female householder with no husband present, 6.6% had a male householder with no wife present, and 28.4% were non-families. 27.4% of all households were made up of individuals, and 17.8% had someone living alone who was 65 years of age or older. The average household size was 2.37 and the average family size was 2.84.

The median age in the village was 40.8 years. 24.6% of residents were under the age of 18; 9% were between the ages of 18 and 24; 20.5% were from 25 to 44; 17.6% were from 45 to 64; and 28.3% were 65 years of age or older. The gender makeup of the village was 49.7% male and 50.3% female.

=== 2000 census ===
As of the census of 2000, there were 489 people, 187 households, and 123 families residing in the village. The population density was 821.8 inhabitants per square mile (317.3/km^{2}). There were 200 housing units at an average density of 336.1 per square mile (129.8/km^{2}). The racial makeup of the village was 99.18% White, and 0.82% from two or more races. Hispanic or Latino people of any race were 1.23% of the population.

There were 187 households, out of which 31.0% had children under the age of 18 living with them, 55.6% were married couples living together, 6.4% had a female householder with no husband present, and 33.7% were non-families. 32.1% of all households were made up of individuals, and 23.0% had someone living alone who was 65 years of age or older. The average household size was 2.25 and the average family size was 2.85.

In the village, the population was spread out, with 21.5% under the age of 18, 4.1% from 18 to 24, 23.9% from 25 to 44, 14.7% from 45 to 64, and 35.8% who were 65 years of age or older. The median age was 45 years. For every 100 females, there were 76.5 males. For every 100 females age 18 and over, there were 73.0 males.

As of 2000 the median income for a household in the village was $35,625, and the median income for a family was $44,792. Males had a median income of $30,139 versus $17,431 for females. The per capita income for the village was $15,243. About 1.7% of families and 3.0% of the population were below the poverty line, including none of those under age 18 and 10.0% of those age 65 or over.

== Religion ==
The village of Adams has three churches, all with denominations of traditional Protestantism. The American Lutheran Church is the only non-Methodist church within the village's borders. There is also a chapel in the Gold Crest Retirement Center, which is located within Adams.

== Culture ==
Two annual festivals occur in Adams. One is centered around American Independence Day celebrations, and incukdes volleyball and softball sporting events, a village-wide barbecue, and a fireworks show; this takes place on the first Saturday of every July. A second event is Adams Community Days, which hosts volleyball, golf, and softball events; another village barbecue; and several tractor pull events.

== Education ==
The village of Adams is home to the offices and facilities of the Daniel Freeman Public School district, a Class 3 entity composed of Freeman Elementary School and Freeman High School. This is one of four school districts serving Gage County.

== Healthcare ==
The village of Adams is home to the Adams Primary Care Clinic, a satellite of the Saint Elizabeth Physician Network spearheaded by Saint Elizabeth Regional Medical Center in the state capital of Lincoln. It also houses the Lake Crest Pharmacy, which serves Adams and neighboring communities as well. Offices pertaining to orthodontics, dentistry, and optometry are located in the village of Adams, although all three are secondary to the main offices in Lincoln.
