= Warder Clyde Allee =

American ecologist

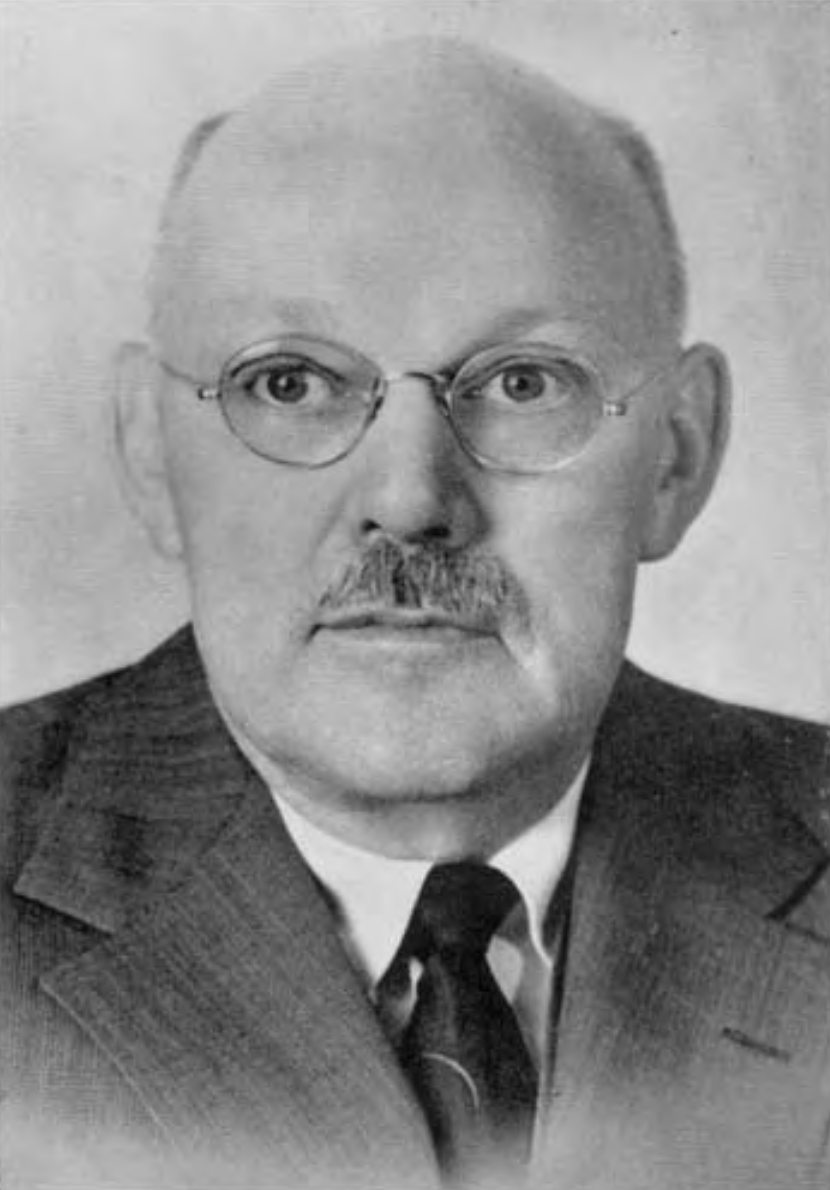
- Born: June 5, 1885; Bloomingdale, Indiana, U.S.
- Died: March 18, 1955 (aged 69); Gainesville, Florida, U.S.
- Education: Earlham College (S.B.); University of Chicago (S.M., Ph.D)
- Known for: Research on animal behavior, protocooperation, and for identifying the Allee effect
- Spouse: Marjorie Hill (m. 1912)
- Children: 2
- Scientific career
- Fields: Behavioral sciences Zoology
- Workplaces: University of Florida; University of Illinois; University of Chicago
- Doctoral students: Thomas Park

Warder Clyde "W.C." Allee (June 5, 1885 – March 18, 1955) was an American ecologist. He is recognized to be one of the great pioneers of American ecology. As an accomplished zoologist and ecologist, Allee was best known and recognized for his research on social behavior, aggregations and distributions of animals in aquatic as well as terrestrial environments. Allee attended Earlham College and upon his graduation in 1908, pursued advanced studies at the University of Chicago where he received his PhD and graduated summa cum laude in 1912.

Allee's most significant research occurred during his time at the University of Chicago and at the Marine Biological Laboratory at Woods Hole in Massachusetts. His research findings led to many publications, with the most notable being Principles of Animal Ecology and Animal Aggregations. Allee was married to author Marjorie Hill Allee and remained active in the field of biology until his death in 1955 at the age of 69.

== Early life ==
Warder Clyde Allee was born on June 5, 1885, on a farm in Bloomingdale, Indiana, to Mary Emily Newlin and John Wesley Allee. He is of French Huguenot heritage; the original surname was spelled d'Ailly. He was named after his paternal grandmother, Sarah Ann Warder.

His father was orphaned as a child and grew up at the homes of various relatives in the Bloomingdale region. Clyde Allee attended a one-room country school and led his class in scholarship. At Friends' Bloomingdale Academy, he was again at the head of his graduating class and the winner of the oratorical contest. At the age of seventeen, he taught country school for a year and then the fifth and sixth grades in the Bloomingdale elementary school for another year. Then, at nineteen, he began his first year at Earlham College. He was raised in the Society of Friends and married Marjorie Hill, whose Quaker ancestry extended back into the seventeenth century. His strong Quaker beliefs would play a large role in his research later in his academic and professional career.

== Personal life ==
Family background combined with the Quaker influence at Earlham College contributed to the Quaker mold in which Allee was cast. In 1912, he married Marjorie Hill, a life-long member of the Society of Friends. Allee met Marjorie when she was a freshman at Earlham College while Allee was a senior. Marjorie was most interested in English Literature and Writing and would go on to help her husband in his books and scientific papers. Specifically, she served as a critic, collaborator, and occasional coauthor. Eventually, she established herself as an author, with a notable series of novels for girls.

== University career ==
He received his bachelor's degree from Earlham College in 1908, and his master's degree and Ph.D. from the University of Chicago in 1910 and 1912 respectively. He was a student of Victor Ernest Shelford and there imbibed the ideas of ecological succession. Allee worked as an assistant professor in Zoology from 1910 to 1912.

Between 1912 and 1921 he taught at the University of Illinois, Williams College, University of Oklahoma, Lake Forest College, and the Marine Biological Laboratory at Woods Hole, Massachusetts. He returned to the University of Chicago in 1921 as an assistant professor of zoology and was promoted to professor in 1928. One of the students he mentored in this role would also become famous in ecology; Garrett Hardin. In addition, he served as dean in the College of Arts, Literature, and Science (1924–1926) and secretary of the Department of Zoology (1927–1934). After retirement in 1950, he worked at the University of Florida at Gainesville, where he was head professor of biology until his death in March 1955.

== Career ==
Allee was strongly influenced by Frank R. Lillie, head of the Department of Zoology at the University of Chicago and one of the founders of the Marine Biological Laboratory in Woods Hole, MA. Allee gained interest in the interactions and patterns of the distribution of marine mammals during his time as an instructor at the Marine Biological Laboratory at Woods Hole in Massachusetts from 1914 to 1921. Allee was also influenced by Peter Kropotkin's theory of mutual aid.

In 1923, Allee began to write a series of papers entitled, Animal Aggregations. Eight years later, he published his findings in a book under the same name. The results of Clyde Allee's research demonstrated the existence of an unconscious drive within species for fellow individuals of the same species. This research helped to prove that under crowding was detrimental to some animals. Allee's research also helped to describe protocooperation, where two species interact with one another in a beneficial way that is not essential to the survival of either organism. It should also be noted that Allee's biological basis of democracy arrived at a time when the future of world politics and human kind's morality were in question themselves. As a Quaker, Allee was committed to world peace and this commitment anteceded his theory of sociality. Allee's Quaker beliefs led to the development of his dedication to show how cooperation is essential in the natural world. This led to the development of the Allee effect.

=== Allee effect ===
Allee dedicated his life to researching the benefits of organisms acting in a group rather than as individuals. Through observing groups of organisms, Allee discovered that cooperation is both beneficial and essential in nature. The Allee effect describes the positive correlation between population density and individual fitness of a population or species.

=== Social Implications ===
Allee's research on social aggregations and the evolution of cooperation coincided with his social activism, religious beliefs, and opposition to war. Raised as a Quaker, Allee publicly renounced war, which made him a target of harsh criticism and persecution.

In the 1940s, Allee argued that his research on the social behaviors of animals provided clear evidence against a biological basis for war. Specifically, he believed that his theory on the sociality of organisms based on cooperation among individuals proved that war was not a natural occurrence. According to Gregg Mitman, Allee saw ecologists as "social healers" who were able to provide a naturalistic foundation for ethics through their research.

== Involvement in other scientific work ==
A spinal tumor caused paralysis, and Allee used a wheelchair after 1935. He nevertheless maintained a full schedule of teaching, research and writing. Allee continued to spend summers at the Marine Biological Laboratory at Woods Hole, and served as a trustee from 1932 to 1955. Having been on the editorial board of Physiological Zoology, a journal published by the University of Chicago Press, since its founding in 1928, Allee took over as managing editor in 1937 and remained in that position until his death. He also chaired the Committee on the Ecology of Animal Populations of the National Research Council which was established in 1941 to solicit and administer funds for research projects in the field. He was elected a fellow of the American Academy of Arts and Sciences in 1950.

== Publications ==
Allee's dedication to research resulted in more than 200 papers and over a dozen books, including Animal Aggregations: A Study in General Sociology (1931), Animal Life and Social Growth (1932), The Social Life of Animals (1938), Principles of Animal Ecology, co-authored by Alfred E. Emerson, Orlando Park, Thomas Park, and Karl P. Schmidt (1949), and Cooperation among Animals, with Human Implications (1951).

== Commemoration, death, and legacy ==
Many biologists and historians believe that Allee's reputation was diminished by the work of another ecologist, George C. Williams. Williams's work, Adaptation and Natural Selection (1966), refutes Allee's research on group cooperation by stressing the importance of individual selection and providing samples that invalidated the idea of group selection.

However, the research and legacy of Allee is still recognized and discussed today as many scientists remain interested in the principles behind the Allee effect. In 1973, the Animal Behavior Society began to offer the W.C. Allee Award for the best presentation of an ethological work of research by a student in a juried competition held at their annual meeting.

Allee died in Gainesville, Florida in 1955, aged 69. He was survived by his two daughters.

== Bibliography ==
- Allee, W. C. (1931). Animal Aggregations. A study in General Sociology. University of Chicago Press, Chicago. ISBN 0-404-14501-9
- Allee, W. C. (1949). Principles of Animal Ecology. W.B. Saunders Co., Philadelphia. ISBN 0-7216-1120-6
- Allee, W. C., Schmidt, K.P. (1951). Ecological Animal Geography: An Authorized, Rewritten edition, 2nd, based on Tiergeographie auf oekologischer Grundlage by Richard Hesse. John Wiley & Sons, New York.
- Courchamp, Franck. Luděk Berec and Joanna Gascoigne. (2008). Allee Effects in Ecology and Conservation. Oxford University Press, New York. ISBN 0-19-857030-9.
- Emerson, Alfred E. Thomas Park: "Warder Clyde Allee: Ecologist and Ethologist". Science vol. 121, No. 3150 (May 13, 1955), p. 686-687 (obituary)
- Dugatkin, Lee Alan. (2006). The Altruism Equation: Seven Scientists Search for the Origins of Goodness. Princeton University Press, Princeton. ISBN 0-691-12590-2
- Mitman, Gregg. The State of Nature: Ecology, Community, and American Social Thought, 1900–1950, Science and Its Conceptual Foundations. Chicago: University of Chicago Press, 1992. ISBN 978-0-226-53237-0

== See also ==
- Animal geographies
- Group selection
- Population density
- Superorganism
