= Penn Township, Parke County, Indiana =

Penn Township
- Township
- Location in Parke County
- Coordinates: 39°51′09″N 87°15′30″W
- Country: United States
- State: Indiana
- County: Parke

Government
  - Type: Indiana township

Area
  - Total: 23.78 sq mi (61.6 km^{2})
  - Land: 23.73 sq mi (61.5 km^{2})
  - Water: 0.05 sq mi (0.13 km^{2}) 0.21%
- Elevation: 633 ft (193 m)

Population (2020)
  - Total: 761
  - Density: 32.1/sq mi (12.4/km^{2})
- Time zone: UTC-5 (Eastern (EST))
  - Summer (DST): UTC-4 (EDT)
- ZIP codes: 47832, 47859, 47862, 47872, 47952
- Area code: 765
- GNIS feature ID: 453713

Penn Township is one of thirteen townships in Parke County, Indiana, United States. As of the 2020 census, its population was 761 and it contained 340 housing units.

Historical population
Census	Pop.	Note	%±
1890	1,260		—
1900	1,336		6.0%
1910	1,393		4.3%
1920	1,203		−13.6%
1930	1,005		−16.5%
1940	1,128		12.2%
1950	1,068		−5.3%
1960	919		−14.0%
1970	887		−3.5%
1980	897		1.1%
1990	843		−6.0%
2000	868		3.0%
2010	810		−6.7%
2020	761		−6.0%
Source: US Decennial Census

== History ==
Penn Township was organized in 1854, and was originally built up chiefly by Quakers.

The Cox Ford Covered Bridge, Joseph Finney House, and Jackson Covered Bridge are listed on the National Register of Historic Places.

== Geography ==
According to the 2010 census, the township has a total area of 23.78 square miles (61.6 km^{2}), of which 23.73 square miles (61.5 km^{2}) (or 99.79%) is land and 0.05 square miles (0.13 km^{2}) (or 0.21%) is water. The township includes the southwest quarter of Turkey Run State Park.

=== Cities, towns, villages ===
- Bloomingdale

=== Unincorporated towns ===
- Annapolis at 39.852540°N 87.250569°W
- Coke Oven Hollow at 39.853095°N 87.291958°W
- Rockport at 39.880873°N 87.278902°W
- Stumptown at 39.852262°N 87.274458°W

(This list is based on USGS data and may include former settlements.)

=== Extinct towns ===
- Pottertown at 39.830873°N 87.262236°W

(These towns are listed as "historical" by the USGS.)

=== Cemeteries ===
The township contains these four cemeteries: Bloomingdale, Coffin, DeBaun and Hethcoe.

=== Major highways ===
- U.S. Route 41
- State Road 47

== School districts ==
- North Central Parke Community School Corporation
- Formerly: Turkey Run Community School Corporation

== Political districts ==
- State House District 41
- State Senate District 38
