= Joseph Finney House =

Historic house in Indiana, United States

- U.S. National Register of Historic Places
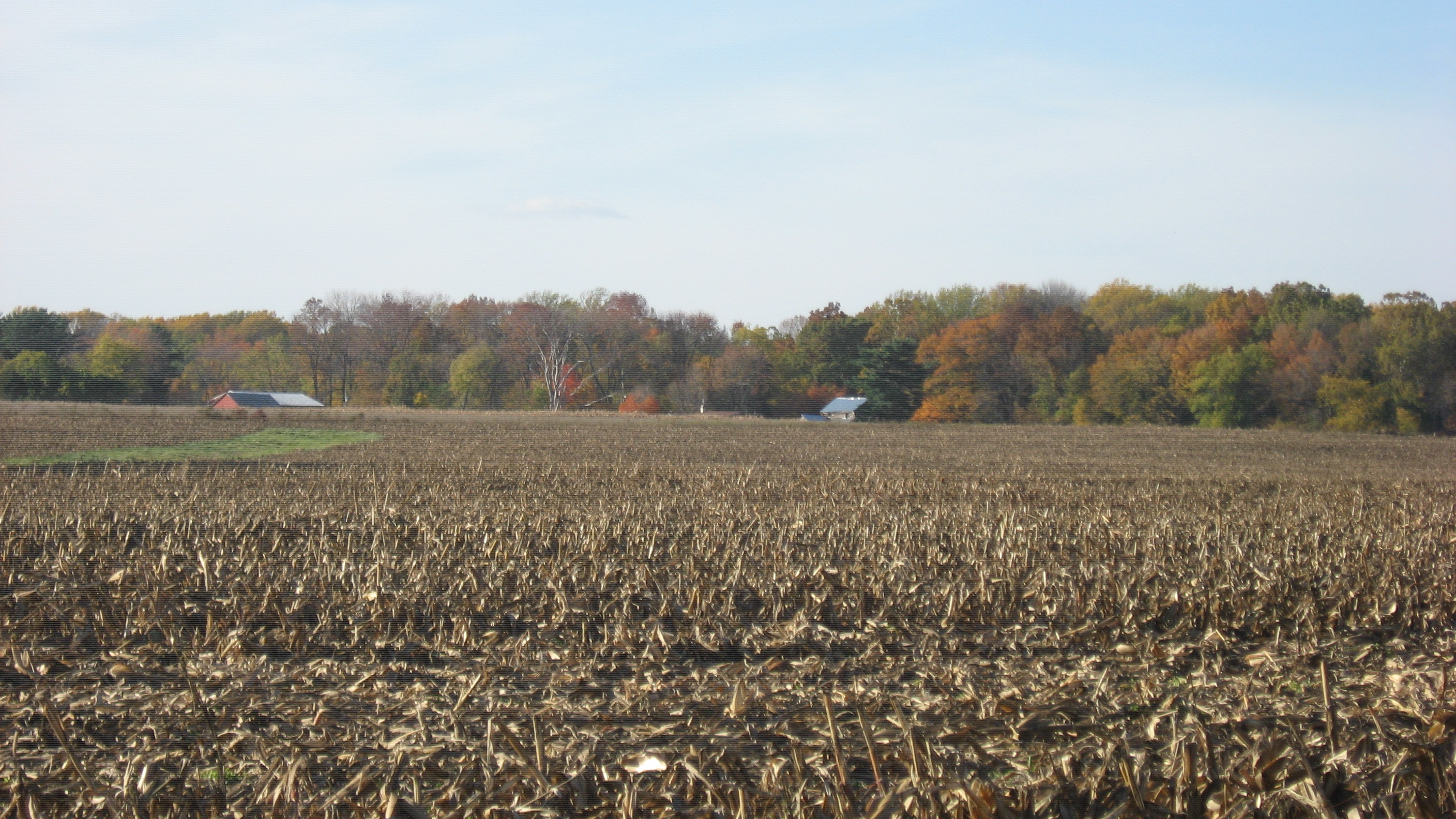
- Joseph Finney House from a distance, October 2012

- Location within Parke County, Indiana Location within Indiana Location within the United States
- Location: County Road 217, northwest of Bloomingdale in Penn Township, Parke County, Indiana
- Coordinates: 39°51′35″N 87°16′18″W
- Area: less than one acre
- Built: 1827
- Architectural style: Continental Log
- NRHP reference No.: 02001564
- Added to NRHP: December 20, 2002

Joseph Finney House is a historic home located in Penn Township, Parke County, Indiana. It was built in 1827, and is a two-story, Continental hewn log structure with a side-gable roof. It has a frame ell. The original log structure measures 24 feet wide and 16 feet deep.

It was added to the National Register of Historic Places in 2002.
