= Coke Oven Hollow, Indiana =

Unincorporated community in Indiana, United States

- Ghost town
- Parke County's location in Indiana

- Location in Parke County
- Coordinates: 39°51′11″N 87°17′31″W
- Country: United States
- State: Indiana
- County: Parke
- Township: Penn
- Elevation: 653 ft (199 m)
- Time zone: UTC-5 (Eastern (EST))
  - Summer (DST): UTC-4 (EDT)
- ZIP code: 47832
- Area code: 765
- GNIS feature ID: 452146

Coke Oven Hollow (also called Foundry) is a ghost town in Penn Township, Parke County, in the U.S. state of Indiana.

A thriving manufacturing settlement during the 19th century, Coke Oven Hollow is today covered by forest.

== History ==
Sugar Creek Iron Foundry was established at the settlement by 1836. Owned by William G. Coffin, the foundry used pig iron imported from Cincinnati to manufacture ploughs, stoves and various milling and gearing items. Finished product was transported to markets in Indianapolis, Richmond, and Cincinnati by way of the nearby Sugar Creek, which joined the Wabash River 4 mi (6.4 km) west.

By 1837, a coal mine was noted at the settlement, used for the production of coke.

A pottery had been established at nearby Annapolis since 1841. Potters' clay mined at Garrard Quarry in Coke Oven Hollow was used there to manufacture stoneware.

A flatboat builder was also located at Coke Oven Hollow.

Industrial activities declined by the early 1900s, and the settlement today is covered by mature forest, and is located within the 93-acre (38 ha) Mossy Point Nature Preserve.
