= Threatened species =

IUCN conservation category

A threatened species is any species (including animals, plants and fungi) which is vulnerable to extinction in the near future. Species that are threatened are sometimes characterised by the population dynamics measure of critical depensation, a mathematical measure of biomass related to population growth rate. This quantitative metric is one method of evaluating the degree of endangerment without direct reference to human activity.

== IUCN definition ==
The International Union for Conservation of Nature (IUCN) is the foremost authority on threatened species, and treats threatened species not as a single category, but as a group of three categories, depending on the degree to which they are threatened:

- Vulnerable species
- Endangered species
- Critically endangered species

Less-than-threatened categories are near threatened, least concern, and the no longer assigned category of conservation dependent. Species that have not been evaluated (NE), or do not have sufficient data (data deficient) also are not considered "threatened" by the IUCN.

The three categories of the threatened species on IUCN Red List.

Although threatened and vulnerable may be used interchangeably when discussing IUCN categories, the term threatened is generally used to refer to the three categories (critically endangered, endangered, and vulnerable), while vulnerable is used to refer to the least at risk of those three categories. They may be used interchangeably in most contexts however, as all vulnerable species are threatened species (vulnerable is a category of threatened species); and, as the more at-risk categories of threatened species (namely endangered and critically endangered) must, by definition, also qualify as vulnerable species, all threatened species may also be considered vulnerable.

Threatened species are also referred to as a red-listed species, as they are listed in the IUCN Red List of Threatened Species.

Subspecies, populations and stocks may also be classified as threatened.

== By country ==
=== Australia ===
==== Federal ====
The Commonwealth of Australia (federal government) has legislation for categorising and protecting endangered species, namely the Environment Protection and Biodiversity Conservation Act 1999, which is known in short as the EPBC Act. This Act has six categories: extinct, extinct in the wild, critically endangered, endangered, vulnerable, and conservation dependent, as defined in Section 179 of the Act. These could be summarised as:

- "Extinct" – "no reasonable doubt that the last member of the species has died";
- "Extinct in the wild" – "known only to survive in cultivation" and "despite exhaustive surveys" has not been seen in the wild;
- "Critically endangered" – "extremely high risk of extinction in the wild in the immediate future";
- "Endangered" – "very high risk of extinction in the wild in the near future";
- "Vulnerable" – "high risk of extinction in the wild in medium-term future"; and
- "Conservation dependent" – "focus of a specific conservation program" without which the species would enter one of the above categories.

The EPBC Act also recognises and protects threatened ecosystems such as plant communities, and Ramsar Convention wetlands used by migratory birds.

Lists of threatened species are drawn up under the Act and these lists are the primary reference to threatened species in Australia. The Species Profile and Threats Database (SPRAT) is a searchable online database about species and ecological communities listed under the EPBC Act. It provides information on what the species looks like, its population and distribution, habitat, movements, feeding, reproduction and taxonomic comments.

A Threatened Mammal Index, publicly launched on 22 April 2020 and combined as of June 2020 with the Threatened Bird Index (created 2018) as the Threatened Species Index, is a research collaboration of the National Environmental Science Program's Threatened Species Recovery Hub, the University of Queensland and BirdLife Australia. It does not show detailed data of individual species, but shows overall trends, and the data can be downloaded via a web-app "to allow trends for different taxonomic groups or regions to be explored and compared". The Index uses data visualisation tools to show data clearly in graphic form, including a graph from 1985 to present of the main index, geographical representation, monitoring consistency and time series and species accumulation. In April 2020 the Mammal Index reported that there had been a decline of more than a third of threatened mammal numbers in the 20 years between 1995 and 2016, but the data also show that targeted conservation efforts are working. The Threatened Mammal Index "is compiled from more than 400,000 individual surveys, and contains population trends for 57 of Australia's threatened or near-threatened terrestrial and marine mammal species".

==== States and territories ====
Individual states and territories of Australia are bound under the EPBC Act, but may also have legislation which gives further protection to certain species, for example Western Australia's Wildlife Conservation Act 1950. Some species, such as Lewin's rail (Lewinia pectoralis), are not listed as threatened species under the EPBC Act, but they may be recognised as threatened by individual states or territories.

Pests and weeds, climate change and habitat loss are some of the key threatening processes faced by native plants and animals listed by the Department of Planning, Industry and Environment of New South Wales.

=== Germany ===
Red-List-Categories of the Federal Agency for Nature Conservation of Germany.

The German Federal Agency for Nature Conservation (German: Bundesamt für Naturschutz, BfN) publishes a regional Red List for Germany of at least 48000 animals and 24000 plants and fungi. The scheme for categorization is similar to that of the IUCN, but adds a "warning list", includes species endangered to an unknown extent, and rare species that are not endangered, but are highly at risk of extinction due to the small population.

=== United States ===
"Threatened" in relation to "endangered" under the ESA.

==== Federal ====
Under the Endangered Species Act in the United States, "threatened" is defined as "any species which is likely to become an endangered species within the foreseeable future throughout all or a significant portion of its range". It is the less protected of the two protected categories. The Bay checkerspot butterfly (Euphydryas editha bayensis) is an example of a threatened subspecies protected under the Endangered Species Act.

==== States ====
Within the U.S., state wildlife agencies have the authority under the ESA to manage species which are considered endangered or threatened within their state but not within all states, and which therefore are not included on the national list of endangered and threatened species. For example, the trumpeter swan (Cygnus buccinator) is threatened in the state of Minnesota, while large populations still remain in Canada and Alaska.

== See also ==
- Biodiversity Action Plan
- IUCN Red List
- Illegal logging
- Rare species
- Red and blue-listed
- Slash-and-burn
- Threatened fauna of Australia
