= Depensation =

Concept in population dynamics

In population dynamics, depensation is the effect on a population (such as a fish stock) whereby, due to certain causes, a decrease in the breeding population (mature individuals) leads to reduced production and survival of eggs or offspring. The causes may include predation levels rising per offspring (given the same level of overall predator pressure) and the Allee effect, particularly the reduced likelihood of finding a mate.

== Critical depensation ==
When the level of depensation is high enough that the population is no longer able to sustain itself, it is said to be a critical depensation. This occurs when the population size has a tendency to decline when the population drops below a certain level (known as the "Critical depensation level"). Ultimately this may lead to the population or fishery's collapse (resource depletion), or even local extinction.

The phenomenon of critical depensation may be modelled or defined by a negative second order derivative of population growth rate with respect of population biomass, which describes a situation where a decline in population biomass is not compensated by a corresponding increase in marginal growth per unit of biomass.

== See also ==
- Abundance (ecology)
- Conservation biology
- Local extinction
- Overexploitation
- Overfishing
- Small population size
- Threatened species
