= Jackson Covered Bridge =

Place in Indiana listed on National Register of Historic Places

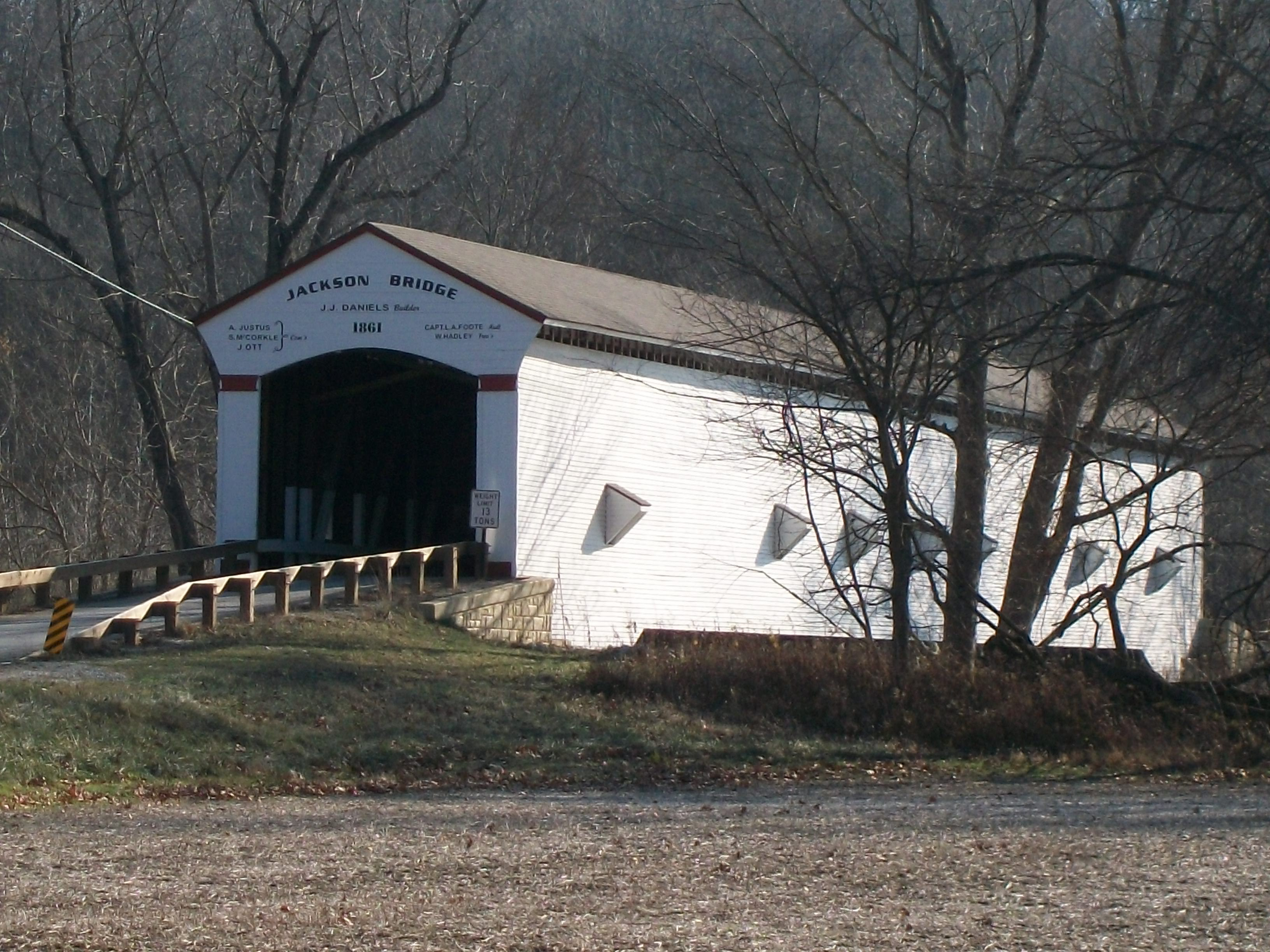
- Jackson Covered Bridge c. 2009
- Coordinates: 39°52′48.09″N 87°16′56.63″W
- Carries: Bloomingdale Road (C.R.25)
- Crosses: Sugar Creek, Parke County, Indiana
- Locale: Rockport, Parke County, Indiana, United States
- Official name: Jackson Covered Bridge
- Other name: Rockport Bridge or Wright's Mill Bridge
- Named for: Andrew Jackson
- Maintained by: Parke County
- WGCB #: 14-61-28

Characteristics
- Design: Double Burr arch truss bridge, double king post
- Material: Hewn stone (foundations)
- Trough construction: Wood
- Total length: 225 ft (68.6 m) (includes 9 ft (2.7 m) overhangs on each end)
- Width: 16 ft (4.9 m)
- Longest span: 207 ft (63.1 m)
- No. of spans: 1
- Clearance above: 18 ft (5.5 m)

History
- Construction cost: $8,000 plus subscriptions
- Jackson Covered Bridge (#19)
- U.S. National Register of Historic Places
- U.S. Historic district – Contributing property
- Location within Parke County, Indiana Location within Indiana Location within the United States
- Built: 1861
- Built by: J. J. Daniels
- Website: Jackson Bridge
- Part of: Parke County Covered Bridges TR (ID64000193)
- NRHP reference No.: 78000393
- Added to NRHP: December 22, 1978

Location
- Interactive map of Jackson Covered Bridge

The Jackson Covered Bridge, also known as the Rockport Covered Bridge, is located in Rockport, Parke County, Indiana, United States.

== History ==
It was built by J. J. Daniels in 1861, and is the oldest remaining bridge built by him. Crossing Sugar Creek, on county road 83 at the intersection with county roads 25 and 232, it is a single span Double Burr Arch truss covered bridge structure built on a base of hewn stone.

Prior Wright had built his second mill in the area of 'Devil's Den' in 1848, after his mill located at The Narrows was washed away by a freshet on New Year's Day 1847. During this time, flat boats would be built and floated over the shallows of Sugar Creek during high waters for the trip to the markets in New Orleans. When the Wabash and Erie Canal came through more business originated from here.

Eventually the mill, a general store, cooper shop, blacksmith shop, two sawmills, and four dwelling houses would come to make up the town of Rockport. In addition, an iron smelter operated for a while using a poor grade of iron ore and the plentiful and high grade coke made from local coal.

By December 1860, the citizens of the area had decided to call on Dr. Hobbs to be their spokesman for a new bridge near Wright's Mill. Dr. Hobbs called upon the Parke County Commissioners to hold a special meeting, and on December 28, they discuss the issue of "several citizens who had presented a petition for a bridge over Sugar Creek at Wright's Upper Mills." John Scott, "presented on behalf of various citizens a petition and subscriptions for a bridge at Star Mills," at the same meeting.

Just four days later on New Year's Day 1861, the commissioners held another special meeting and approved both bridges to be built with $8,000 from the county, "...provided the citizens would make up enough subscriptions to make up the balance on the cost of these two bridges."

Within a week and a half, January 17, $3,307 and 300 signatures had been collected by the petition leaders Byers, Milligan, Graham, and Elwood Hadley. James Johnson and Henry Wolf were appointed to select sites for the bridges, establish specifications and provide estimates for the county commissioners.

Back in 1859, the Parke County Commissioners had received a letter from J. J. Daniels, on the behalf of William D. Daniels, on the proposal of building bridges at Wright's Mill and Star Mills. Bids were opened at the March 1861 meeting. William D. Daniels was awarded the bid and on April 22, the contracts were signed, filed, and $1,000 advance was allowed. Brown and Company had finished the masonry work, that had been subcontracted out to them, for the abutments by September 16, and Mr. Daniels was given $6,000 to pay for the work. This was to be the only bridge in Parke County built by J. J. Daniels that would contain a cornerstone in the abutment. The cornerstone is located in the south upstream side of the bridge and reads, "Builder J. J. Daniels 1861". On November 9, 1861, the bridge was ready for its final inspection by the county commissioners and on November 11, Daniels was paid $1,500 for the Jackson bridge contract and an additional $2,500. The additional amount may have been for the Star Mills Bridge which was completed in December.

It is the longest single span covered bridge in Indiana and the oldest bridge still standing built by J. J. Daniels.

Built during the unstable political era of the American Civil War, J. J. Daniels wanted to make a clear political statement and named the bridge after Andrew Jackson to honor his statement to John Calhoun: "To the Union, it must be preserved." When the bridge was first built the portal was lettered: "The Federal Union: It must be preserved."

It was added to the National Register of Historic Places in 1978.

== Gallery ==
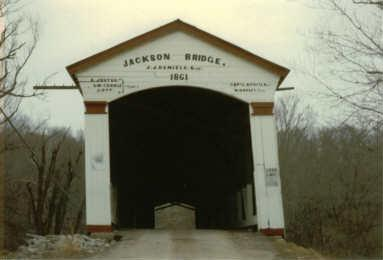
Jackson Bridge in the mid-1990s

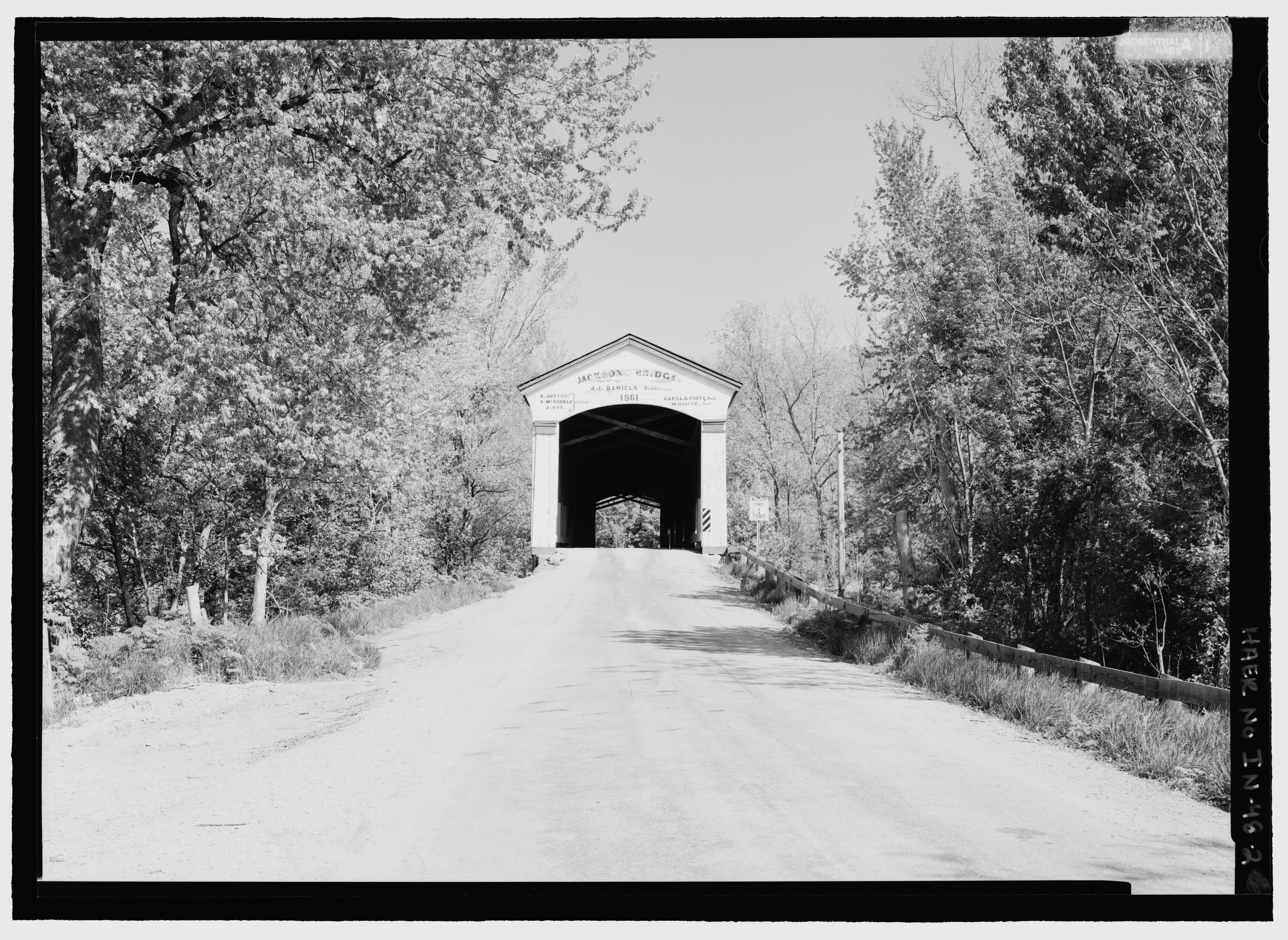
View from the Southeast

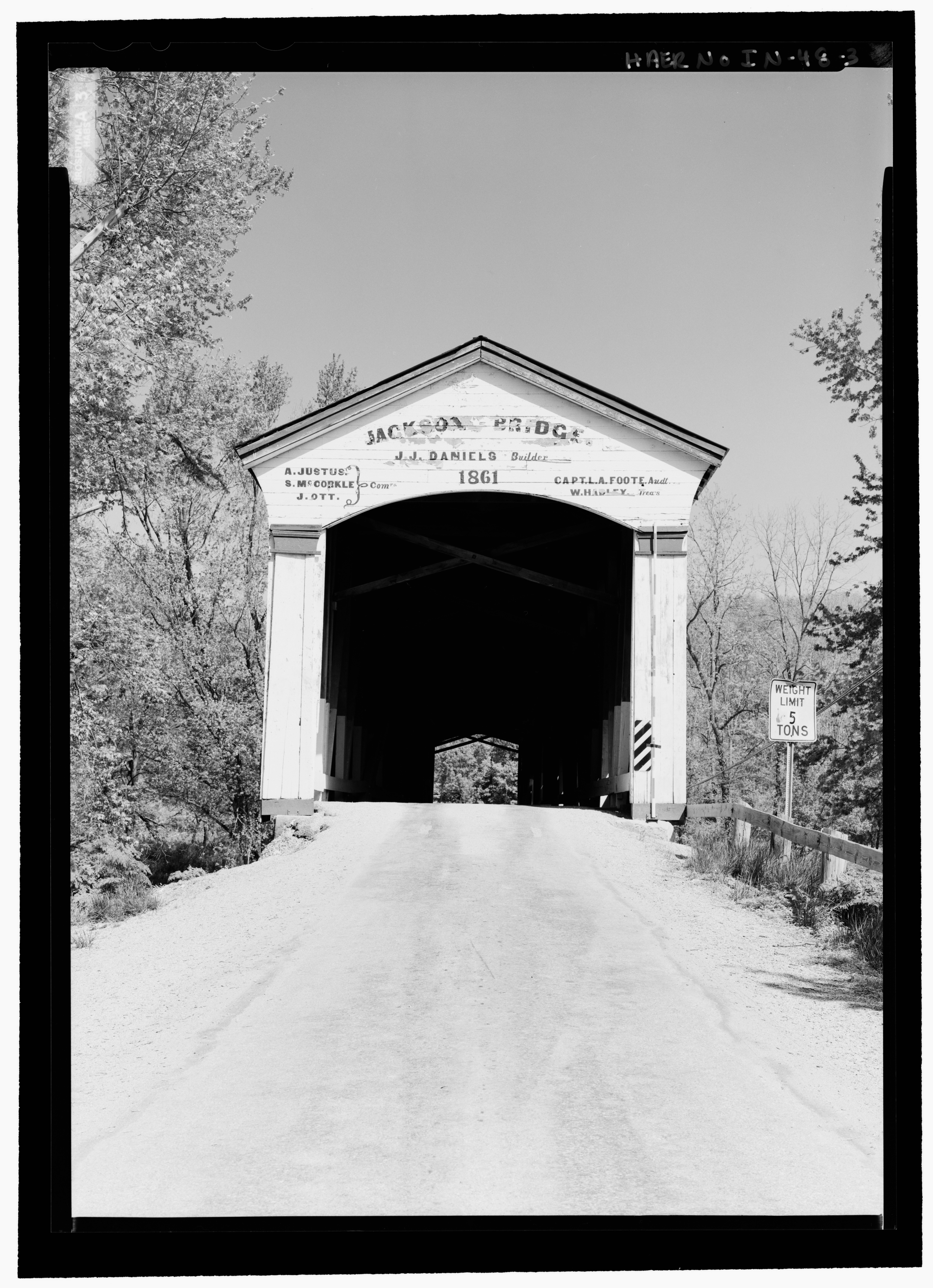
Close-up of Southeast portal

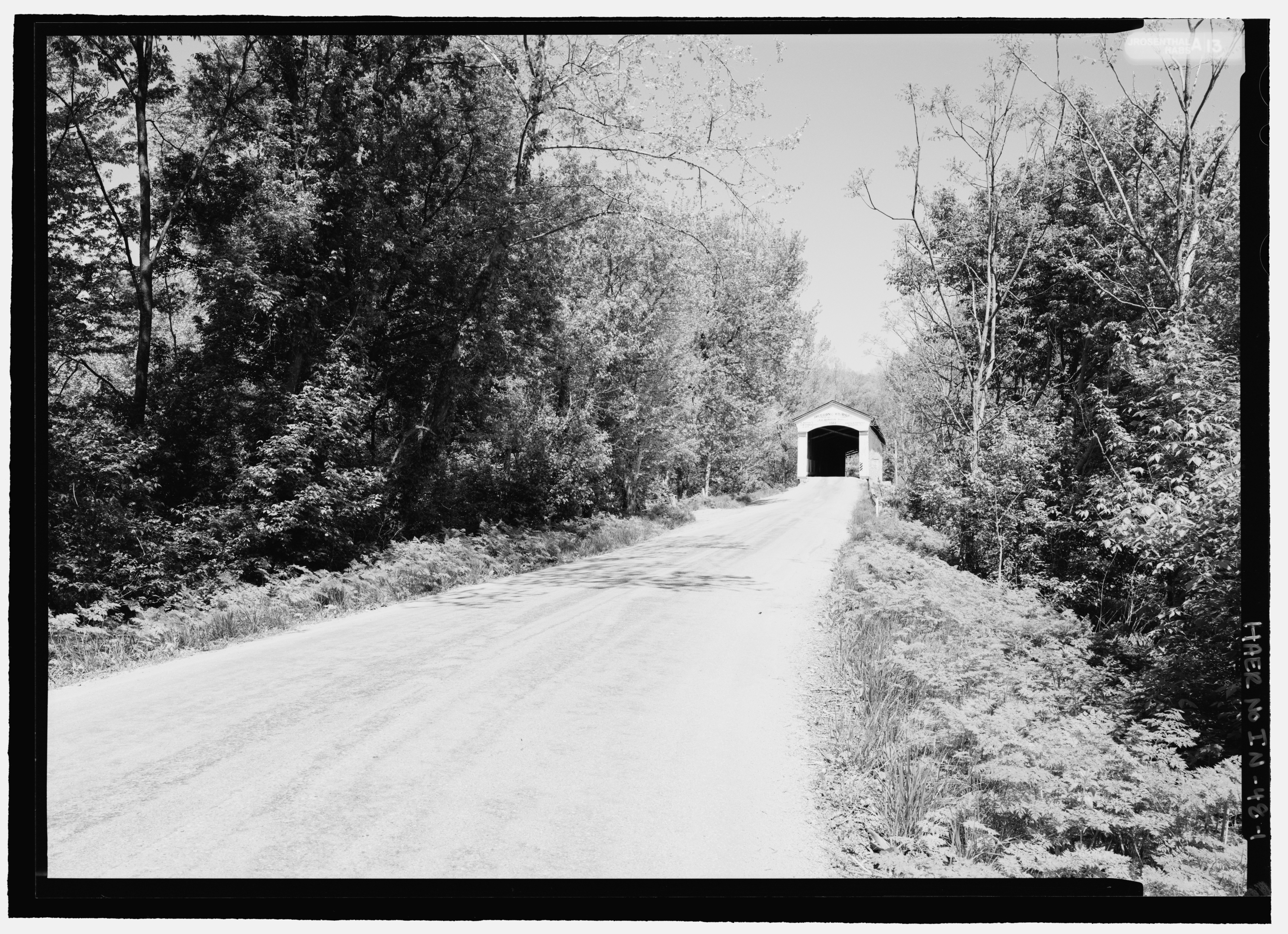
View from Southeast of the approach and portal

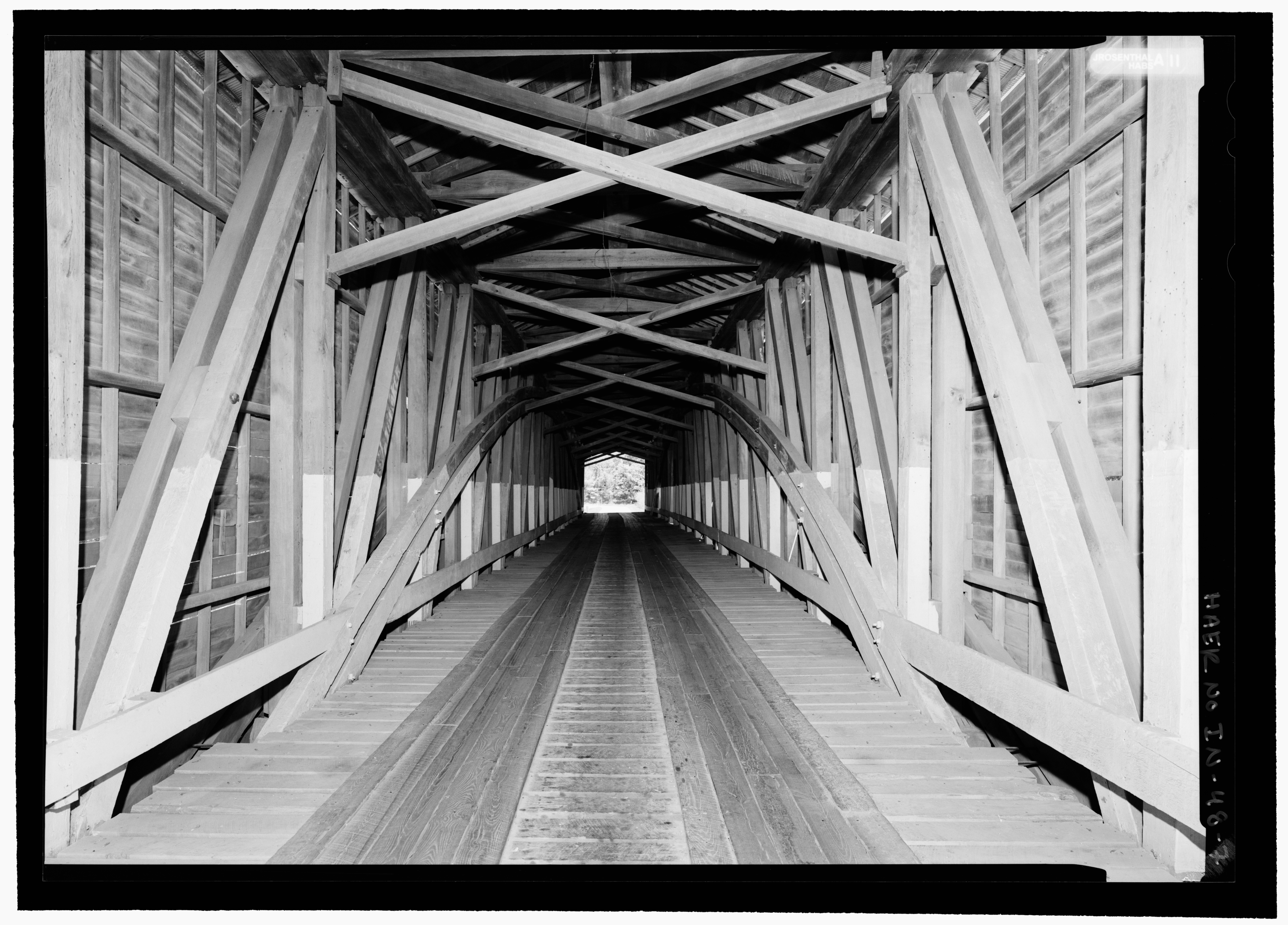
Interior view from Southeast

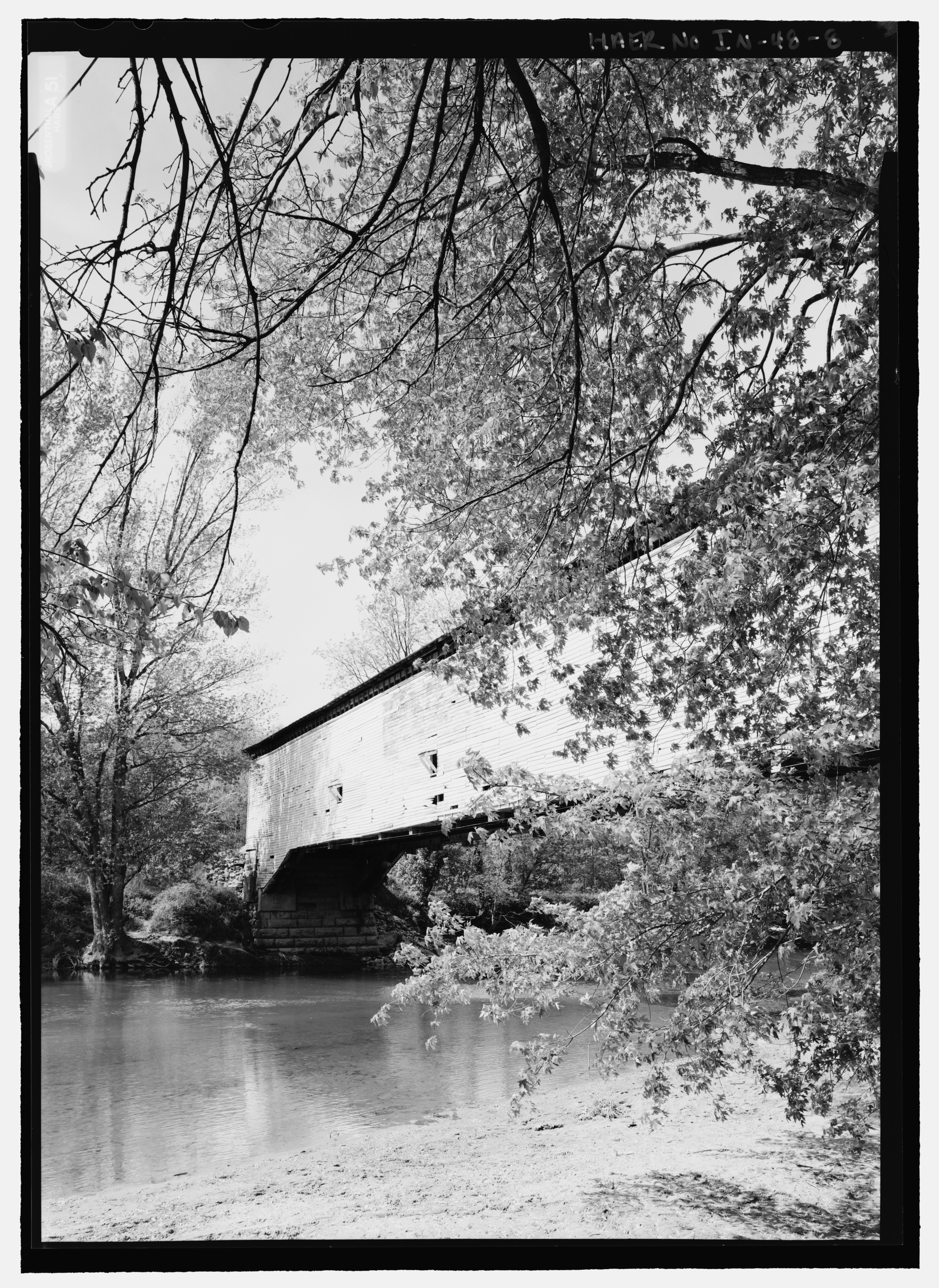
Exterior view of Southwest side of bridge from South bank of Sugar Creek

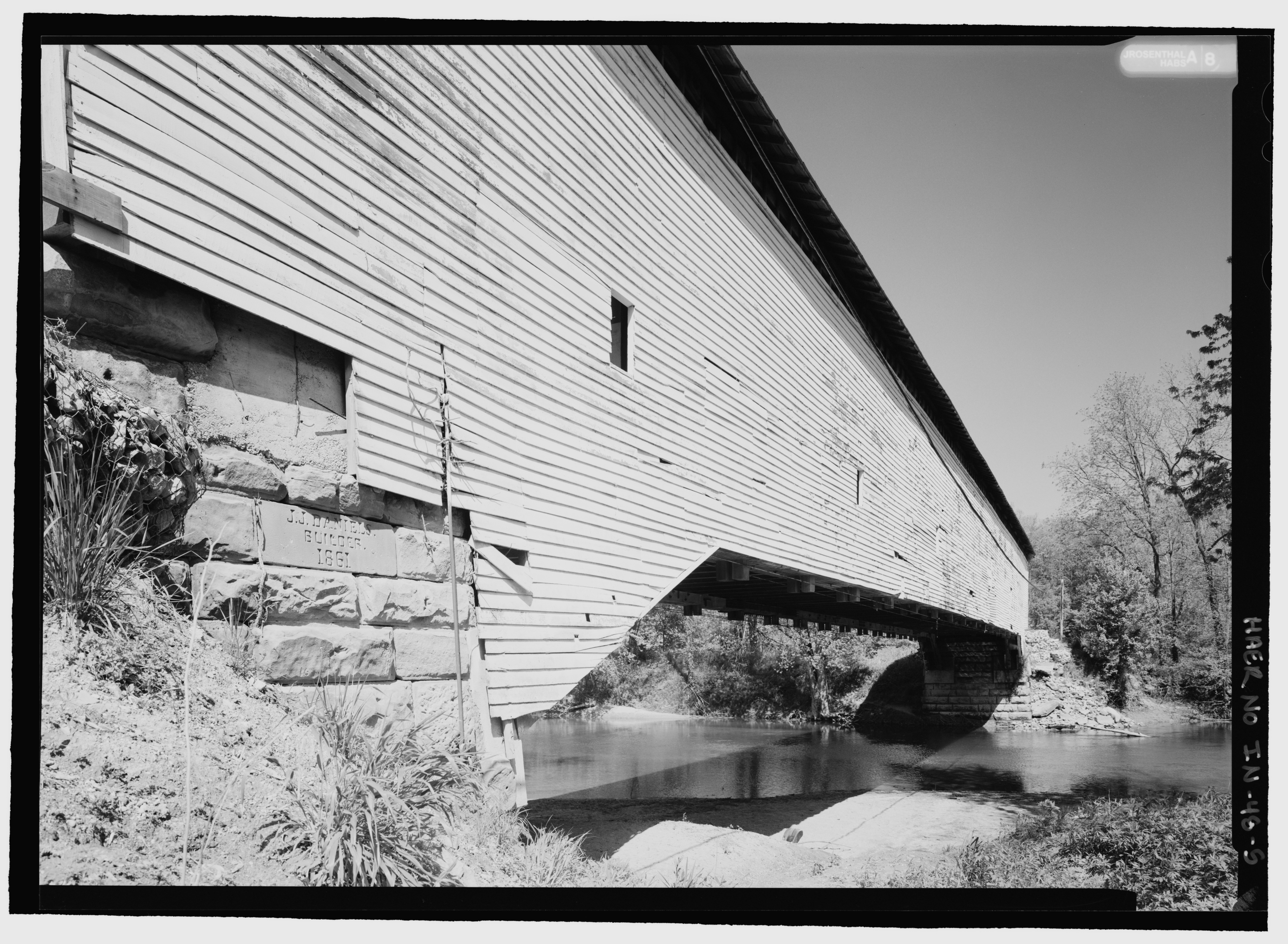
Exterior view of Northeast side of bridge from South bank of Sugar Creek; Cornerstone visible in South abutment

== See also ==
- List of bridges documented by the Historic American Engineering Record in Indiana
- List of Registered Historic Places in Indiana
- Parke County Covered Bridges
- Parke County Covered Bridge Festival
