= Annapolis, Indiana =

Unincorporated community in Indiana, United States

- Unincorporated community
- Parke County's location in Indiana

- Location in Parke County
- Coordinates: 39°51′09″N 87°15′02″W
- Country: United States
- State: Indiana
- County: Parke
- Township: Penn
- Elevation: 646 ft (197 m)
- Time zone: UTC-5 (Eastern (EST))
  - Summer (DST): UTC-4 (EDT)
- ZIP code: 47832
- Area code: 765
- GNIS feature ID: 430182

Annapolis is an unincorporated community in Penn Township, Parke County, in the U.S. state of Indiana.

== History ==
Annapolis was first settled in 1825 or 1826. It was platted on February 4, 1837, by settlers William Maris Sr. and John Moulder. As of 1910, its population was about 200. It was probably named after Annapolis, Maryland. A post office was established at Annapolis in 1837, and remained in operation until 1905.

== Geography ==
Annapolis is located in northwestern Parke County, about 1 mile (1.6 km) north of Bloomingdale and less than one mile west of U.S. Route 41. Its elevation is 646 feet.
