= William Hill Polygonal Barn =

- U.S. National Register of Historic Places
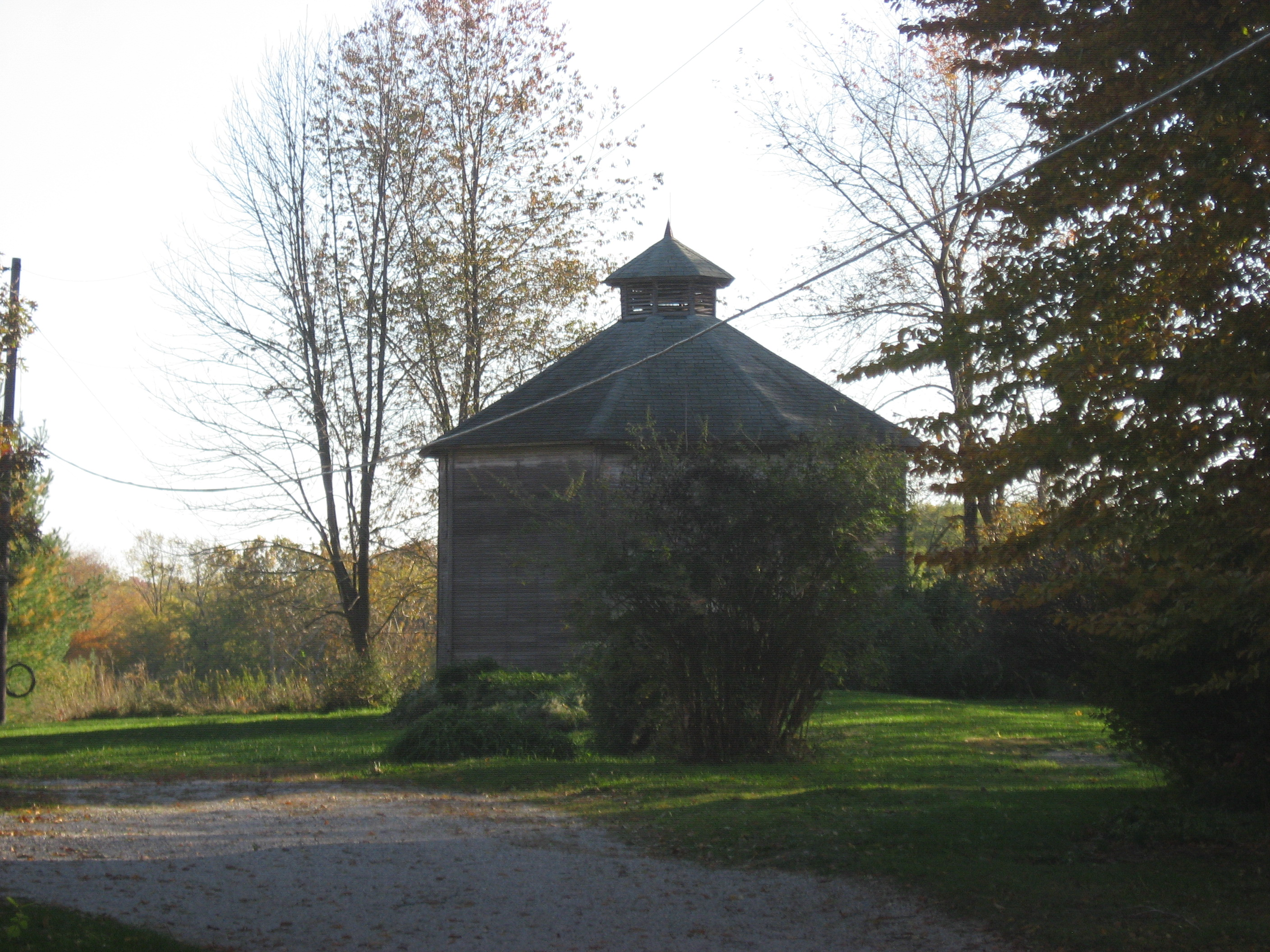
- William Hill Polygonal Barn, October 2012

- Location within Parke County, Indiana Location within Indiana Location within the United States
- Location: School St., Bloomingdale, Indiana
- Coordinates: 39°48′49″N 87°15′5″W
- Area: less than one acre
- Built: 1905
- Built by: Hill, William
- Architectural style: Eight-sided barn
- MPS: Round and Polygonal Barns of Indiana MPS
- NRHP reference No.: 93000186
- Added to NRHP: April 2, 1993

William Hill Polygonal Barn, also known as the Hill-Mershon Barn, is an eight-sided barn located at Bloomingdale, Indiana. It was built about 1905, and is a two-story, octagonal frame building. It measures 30 feet in width and is topped by a sectional cone roof topped by an octagonal cupola.

It was added to the National Register of Historic Places in 1993.
