= Allee effect =

Population phenomenon in biology

The Allee effect is a phenomenon in biology characterized by a correlation between population size or density and the mean individual fitness (often measured as per capita population growth rate) of a population or species.

== History and background ==
Although the concept of Allee effect had no title at the time, it was first described in the 1930s by its namesake, Warder Clyde Allee. Through experimental studies, Allee was able to demonstrate that goldfish have a greater survival rate when there are more individuals in the tank. This led him to conclude that aggregation can improve the survival rate of individuals, and that cooperation may be crucial in the overall evolution of social structure. The term "Allee principle" was introduced in the 1950s, a time when the field of ecology was heavily focused on the role of competition among and within species. The classical view of population dynamics stated that due to competition for resources, a population will experience a reduced overall growth rate at higher density and increased growth rate at lower density. In other words, individuals in a population would be better off when there are fewer individuals around, due to a limited amount of resources (see logistic growth). However, the concept of the Allee effect introduced the idea that the reverse holds true when the population density is low. Individuals within a species often require the assistance of another individual for more than simple reproductive reasons in order to persist. The most obvious example of this is observed in animals that hunt for prey or defend against predators as a group.

== Definition ==
The generally accepted definition of Allee effect is positive density dependence, or the positive correlation between population density and individual fitness. It is sometimes referred to as "undercrowding" and it is analogous (or even considered synonymous by some) to "depensation" in the field of fishery sciences. Listed below are a few significant subcategories of the Allee effect used in the ecology literature.

=== Component vs. demographic Allee effects ===
The component Allee effect is the positive relationship between any measurable component of individual fitness and population density. The demographic Allee effect is the positive relationship between the overall individual fitness and population density.

The distinction between the two terms lies on the scale of the Allee effect: the presence of a demographic Allee effect suggests the presence of at least one component Allee effect, while the presence of a component Allee effect does not necessarily result in a demographic Allee effect. For example, cooperative hunting and the ability to more easily find mates, both influenced by population density, are component Allee effects, as they influence individual fitness of the population. At low population density, these component Allee effects would add up to produce an overall demographic Allee effect (increased fitness with higher population density). When population density reaches a high number, negative density dependence often offsets the component Allee effects through resource competition, thus erasing the demographic Allee effect. Allee effects might occur even at high population density for some species.

=== Strong vs. weak Allee effects ===
Allee effects are classified by the nature of density dependence at low densities. If the population shrinks for low densities, there is a strong Allee effect. If the proliferation rate is positive and increasing then there is a weak Allee effect. The null hypothesis is that proliferation rates are positive but decreasing at low densities.

The strong Allee effect is a demographic Allee effect with a critical population size or density. The weak Allee effect is a demographic Allee effect without a critical population size or density.

The distinction between the two terms is based on whether or not the population in question exhibits a critical population size or density. A population exhibiting a weak Allee effect will possess a reduced per capita growth rate (directly related to individual fitness of the population) at lower population density or size. However, even at this low population size or density, the population will always exhibit a positive per capita growth rate. Meanwhile, a population exhibiting a strong Allee effect will have a critical population size or density under which the population growth rate becomes negative. Therefore, when the population density or size hits a number below this threshold, the population will be destined for extinction without any further aid. A strong Allee effect is often easier to demonstrate empirically using time series data, as one can pinpoint the population size or density at which per capita growth rate becomes negative.

== Mechanisms ==
Due to its definition as the positive correlation between population density and average fitness, the mechanisms for which an Allee effect arises are therefore inherently tied to survival and reproduction. In general, these Allee effect mechanisms arise from cooperation or facilitation among individuals in the species. Examples of such cooperative behaviors include better mate finding, environmental conditioning, and group defense against predators. As these mechanisms are more-easily observable in the field, they tend to be more commonly associated with the Allee effect concept. Nevertheless, mechanisms of Allee effect that are less conspicuous such as inbreeding depression and sex ratio bias should be considered as well.

=== Ecological mechanism ===
Although numerous ecological mechanisms for Allee effects exist, the list of most commonly cited facilitative behaviors that contribute to Allee effects in the literature include: mate limitation, cooperative defense, cooperative feeding, and environmental conditioning. While these behaviors are classified in separate categories, they can overlap and tend to be context dependent (will operate only under certain conditions – for example, cooperative defense will only be useful when there are predators or competitors present).

Mate limitation
Mate limitation refers to the difficulty of finding a compatible and receptive mate for sexual reproduction at lower population size or density. This is generally a problem encountered by species that utilize passive reproduction and possess low mobility, such as plankton, plants and sessile invertebrates. For example, wind-pollinated plants would have a lower fitness in sparse populations due to the lower likelihood of pollen successfully landing on a conspecific.

Cooperative defense
Another possible benefit of aggregation is to protect against predation by group anti-predator behavior. Many species exhibit higher rates of predator vigilance behavior per individual at lower density. This increased vigilance might result in less time and energy spent on foraging, thus reducing the fitness of an individual living in smaller groups. One striking example of such shared vigilance is exhibited by meerkats. Meanwhile, other species move in synchrony to confuse and avoid predators such as schools of sardines and flocks of starlings. The confusion effect that this herding behavior would have on predators will be more effective when more individuals are present.

Cooperative feeding
Certain species also require group foraging in order to survive. As an example, species that hunt in packs, such as the African wild dogs, would not be able to locate and capture prey as efficiently in smaller groups.

Environmental conditioning / habitat alteration
Environmental conditioning generally refers to the mechanism in which individuals work together in order to improve their immediate or future environment for the benefit of the species. This alteration could involve changes in both abiotic (temperature, turbulence, etc.) or biotic (toxins, hormones, etc.) environmental factors. Pacific salmon present a potential case of such component Allee effects, where the density of spawning individuals can affect the survivability of the following generations. Spawning salmon carry marine nutrients they acquired from the ocean as they migrate to freshwater streams to reproduce, which in turn fertilize the surrounding habitat when they die, thus creating a more suitable habitat for the juveniles that would hatch in the following months. While compelling, this case of environmental conditioning by salmon has not been rigorously supported by empirical evidence.

=== Human induced ===
Classic economic theory predicts that human exploitation of a population is unlikely to result in species extinction because the escalating costs to find the last few individuals will exceed the fixed price one achieves by selling the individuals on the market. However, when rare species are more desirable than common species, prices for rare species can exceed high harvest costs. This phenomenon can create an "anthropogenic" Allee effect where rare species go extinct but common species are sustainably harvested. The anthropogenic Allee effect has become a standard approach for conceptualizing the threat of economic markets on endangered species. However, the original theory was posited using a one dimensional analysis of a two dimensional model. It turns out that a two dimensional analysis yields an Allee curve in human exploiter and biological population space and that this curve separating species destined to extinction vs persistence can be complicated. Even very high population sizes can potentially pass through the originally proposed Allee thresholds on predestined paths to extinction.

=== Genetic mechanisms ===
Declines in population size can result in a loss of genetic diversity, and owing to genetic variation's role in the evolutionary potential of a species, this could in turn result in an observable Allee effect. As a species' population becomes smaller, its gene pool will be reduced in size as well. One possible outcome from this genetic bottleneck is a reduction in fitness of the species through the process of genetic drift, as well as inbreeding depression. This overall fitness decrease of a species is caused by an accumulation of deleterious mutations throughout the population. Genetic variation within a species could range from beneficial to detrimental. Nevertheless, in a smaller sized gene pool, there is a higher chance of a stochastic event in which deleterious alleles become fixed (genetic drift). While evolutionary theory states that expressed deleterious alleles should be purged through natural selection, purging would be most efficient only at eliminating alleles that are highly detrimental or harmful. Mildly deleterious alleles such as those that act later in life would be less likely to be removed by natural selection, and conversely, newly acquired beneficial mutations are more likely to be lost by random chance in smaller genetic pools than larger ones.

Although the long-term population persistence of several species with low genetic variation has recently prompted debate on the generality of inbreeding depression, there are various empirical evidences for genetic Allee effects. One such case was observed in the endangered Florida panther (Puma concolor coryi). The Florida panther experienced a genetic bottleneck in the early 1990s where the population was reduced to ≈25 adult individuals. This reduction in genetic diversity was correlated with defects that include lower sperm quality, abnormal testosterone levels, cowlicks, and kinked tails. In response, a genetic rescue plan was put in motion and several female pumas from Texas were introduced into the Florida population. This action quickly led to the reduction in the prevalence of the defects previously associated with inbreeding depression. Although the timescale for this inbreeding depression is larger than of those more immediate Allee effects, it has significant implications on the long-term persistence of a species.

=== Demographic stochasticity ===
Demographic stochasticity refers to variability in population growth arising from sampling random births and deaths in a population of finite size. In small populations, demographic stochasticity will decrease the population growth rate, causing an effect similar to the Allee effect, which will increase the risk of population extinction. Whether or not demographic stochasticity can be considered a part of Allee effect is somewhat contentious however. The most current definition of Allee effect considers the correlation between population density and mean individual fitness. Therefore, random variation resulting from birth and death events would not be considered part of Allee effect as the increased risk of extinction is not a consequence of the changing fates of individuals within the population.

Meanwhile, when demographic stochasticity results in fluctuations of sex ratios, it arguably reduces the mean individual fitness as population declines. For example, a fluctuation in small population that causes a scarcity in one sex would in turn limit the access of mates for the opposite sex, decreasing the fitness of the individuals within the population. This type of Allee effect will likely be more prevalent in monogamous species than polygynous species.

== Effects on range-expanding populations ==
Demographic and mathematical studies demonstrate that the existence of an Allee effect can reduce the speed of range expansion of a population and can even prevent biological invasions.

Recent results based on spatio-temporal models show that the Allee effect can also promote genetic diversity in expanding populations. These results counteract commonly held notions that the Allee effect possesses net adverse consequences. Reducing the growth rate of the individuals ahead of the colonization front simultaneously reduces the speed of colonization and enables a diversity of genes coming from the core of the population to remain on the front. The Allee effect also affects the spatial distribution of diversity. Whereas spatio-temporal models which do not include an Allee effect lead to a vertical pattern of genetic diversity (i.e., a strongly structured spatial distribution of genetic fractions), those including an Allee effect lead to a "horizontal pattern" of genetic diversity (i.e., an absence of genetic differentiation in space).

== Mathematical models ==
A simple mathematical example of an Allee effect is given by the cubic growth model.

$$\frac{dN}{dt} = -r N \left( 1 - \frac{N}{A} \right) \left( 1 - \frac{N}{K} \right),$$

where the population has a negative growth rate for $0< N < A$, and a positive growth rate for $A < N < K$ (assuming $0 < A < K$). This is a departure from the logistic growth equation

$$\frac{dN}{dt} = r  N \left( 1- \frac{N}{K} \right)$$

where

N = population size;
r = intrinsic rate of increase;
K = carrying capacity;
A = critical point; and
dN/dt = rate of increase of the population.

After dividing both sides of the equation by the population size N, in the logistic growth the left hand side of the equation represents the per capita population growth rate, which is dependent on the population size N, and decreases with increasing N throughout the entire range of population sizes. In contrast, when there is an Allee effect the per-capita growth rate increases with increasing N over some range of population sizes [0, N].

The Allee effect can be explicitly modeled using birth and death rates. For instance, the equation

$\frac{dN}{dt} = (B(N) - D(N))N = \left( \frac{b_0N}{b_1 + N} - d - cN \right)N$

has a locally stable equilibrium at $N=0$ when $b_0-d-b_1c>2\sqrt{b_1cd}$. Here, $b_0, b_1, c, d$ are positive constants and $B(N)$ and $D(N)$ represent the per capita birth and death rates, respectively. This formulation is especially useful when demographic data is employed to identify parameters or when extending the model to stochastic differential equations.

Spatio-temporal models can take Allee effect into account as well. A simple example is given by the reaction-diffusion model

$$\frac{\partial N}{\partial t} =D \frac{\partial^2 N}{\partial x^2}+ r N \left( \frac{N}{A} - 1 \right) \left( 1 - \frac{N}{K} \right),$$

where

D = diffusion coefficient;
$\frac{\partial^2}{\partial x^2} ={}$one-dimensional Laplace operator.

When a population is made up of small sub-populations additional factors to the Allee effect arise.

If the sub-populations are subject to different environmental variations (i.e. separated enough that a disaster could occur at one sub-population site without affecting the other sub-populations) but still allow individuals to travel between sub-populations, then the individual sub-populations are more likely to go extinct than the total population. In the case of a catastrophic event decreasing numbers at a sub-population, individuals from another sub-population site may be able to repopulate the area.

If all sub-populations are subject to the same environmental variations (i.e. if a disaster affected one, it would affect them all) then fragmentation of the population is detrimental to the population and increases extinction risk for the total population. In this case, the species receives none of the benefits of a small sub-population (loss of the sub-population is not catastrophic to the species as a whole) and all of the disadvantages (inbreeding depression, loss of genetic diversity and increased vulnerability to environmental instability) and the population would survive better unfragmented.

== Allee principles of aggregation ==
Clumping results due to individuals aggregating in response to: local habitat or landscape differences, daily and seasonal weather changes, reproductive processes, or as the result of social attractions.
