= Friends' Bloomingdale Academy =

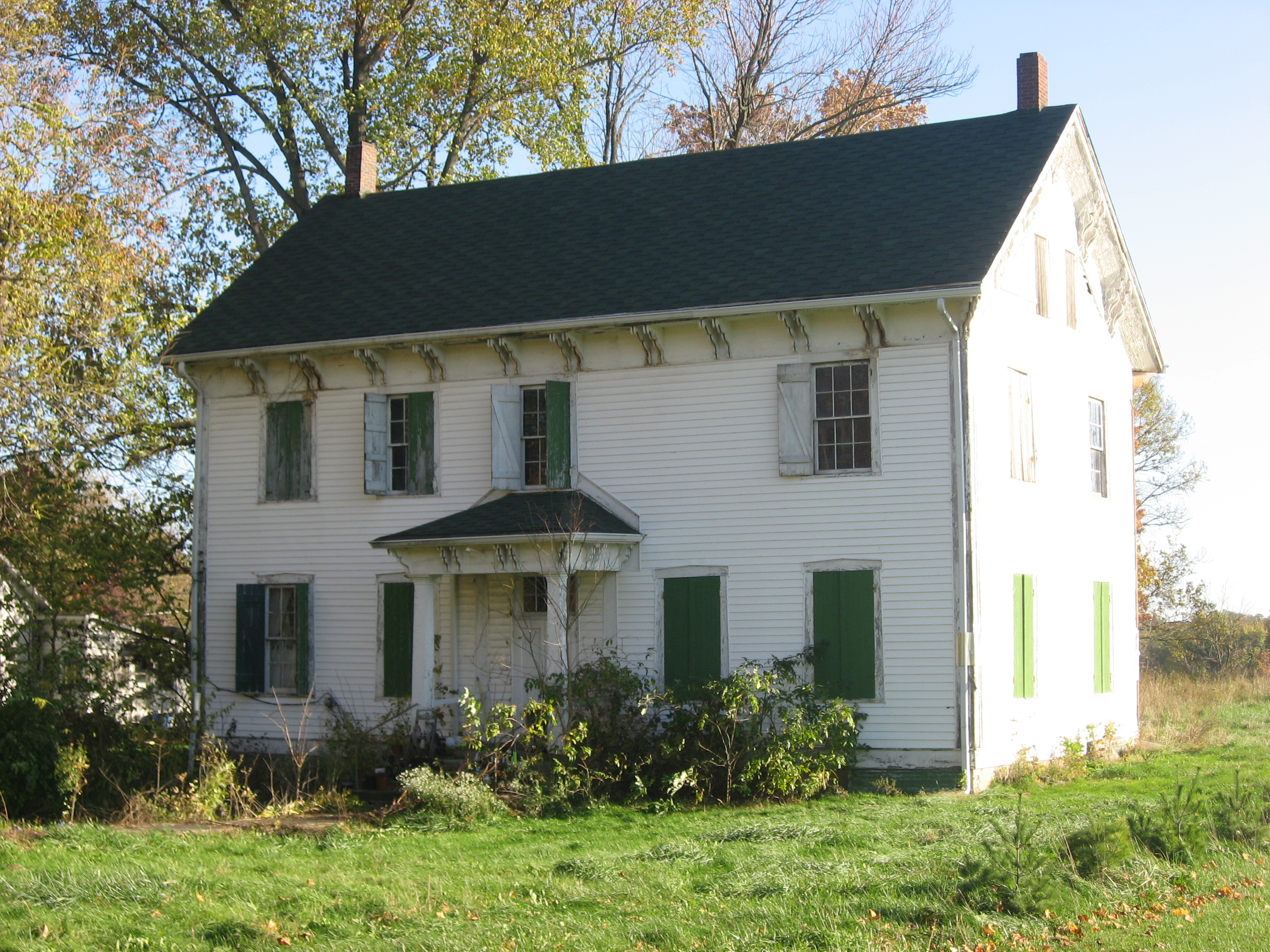
- Dennis Hall, Friends' Bloomingdale Academy
- Bloomingdale, Indiana, U.S.

Information
- Former name: Western Manual Labor School
- Religious affiliation: Society of Friends
- Established: 1846
- Closed: 1916
- Grades: High school
- Gender: coeducational

Friends' Bloomingdale Academy (previously, Western Manual Labor School) was an American Quaker coeducational school in Bloomingdale, Indiana that operated from 1846 to 1916. For many years, this institution enjoyed the rank of an Indiana commissioned high school.

This institution of learning was organized as the Western Manual Labor School, to furnish a thorough education for young persons of both sexes, and give them an opportunity to pay for their tuition in labor on the farm and in the workshops of the institution. It originated with the Society of Friends in Bloomingdale, Indiana, and remained a strictly denominational organization throughout its entire existence, never having received public money. Though it continued to be controlled by the Quarterly Meeting of Friends, no distinction was made between students with respect to religious beliefs. The academy possessed an endowment fund of between US$6,000 and US$7,000.

== History ==
The Friends' Bloomingdale academy was founded as a manual labor school in 1845 under the care of the Friends in western Indiana. About that time, there was much speculation on new educational schemes. The socialistic system was rampant, communities were being organized, and manual labor schools had many enthusiastic advocates. Harvey Thomas, a well known educator of Pennsylvania, having conceived the idea of establishing a manual labor school somewhere in the west, came out to Parke County, Indiana, and found a promising field for such an enterprise and attentive listeners to his economic plans. About 30 acres (12 ha) of land were purchased at Bloomfield (now Bloomingdale) and buildings were erected. In a few years, the manual labor phase of the institution was abandoned as impracticable. Though failing to reach what was desired in technical arts and industries, the school was a success in college work. Prominent among those to whom the institution owes its success was Barnabas C. Hobbs, LL. D., who served as superintendent for 21 years. During his superintendency the school was reorganized and incorporated under the laws of Indiana as the Friends' Bloomingdale academy. The charter provided that this institution shall be controlled and managed by Bloomingdale quarterly meeting of the Friends' church. Its officers consisted of a board of trustees appointed by the church. This board selected a principal who had immediate jurisdiction over the school. This academy is supported mainly by tuition of its students. The attendance in 1861-62 was 148, of which 33 were in the Academic Department, 49 in the Intermediate Department, 21 in the Elementary Department, and 35 in the Commercial Department. There was an endowment fund that gives an annual revenue of US$300.

In 1916, the trustees decided to sell the academy and institute a township high school in its place. The school building was destroyed by fire in April 1919.

== Architecture and fitting ==
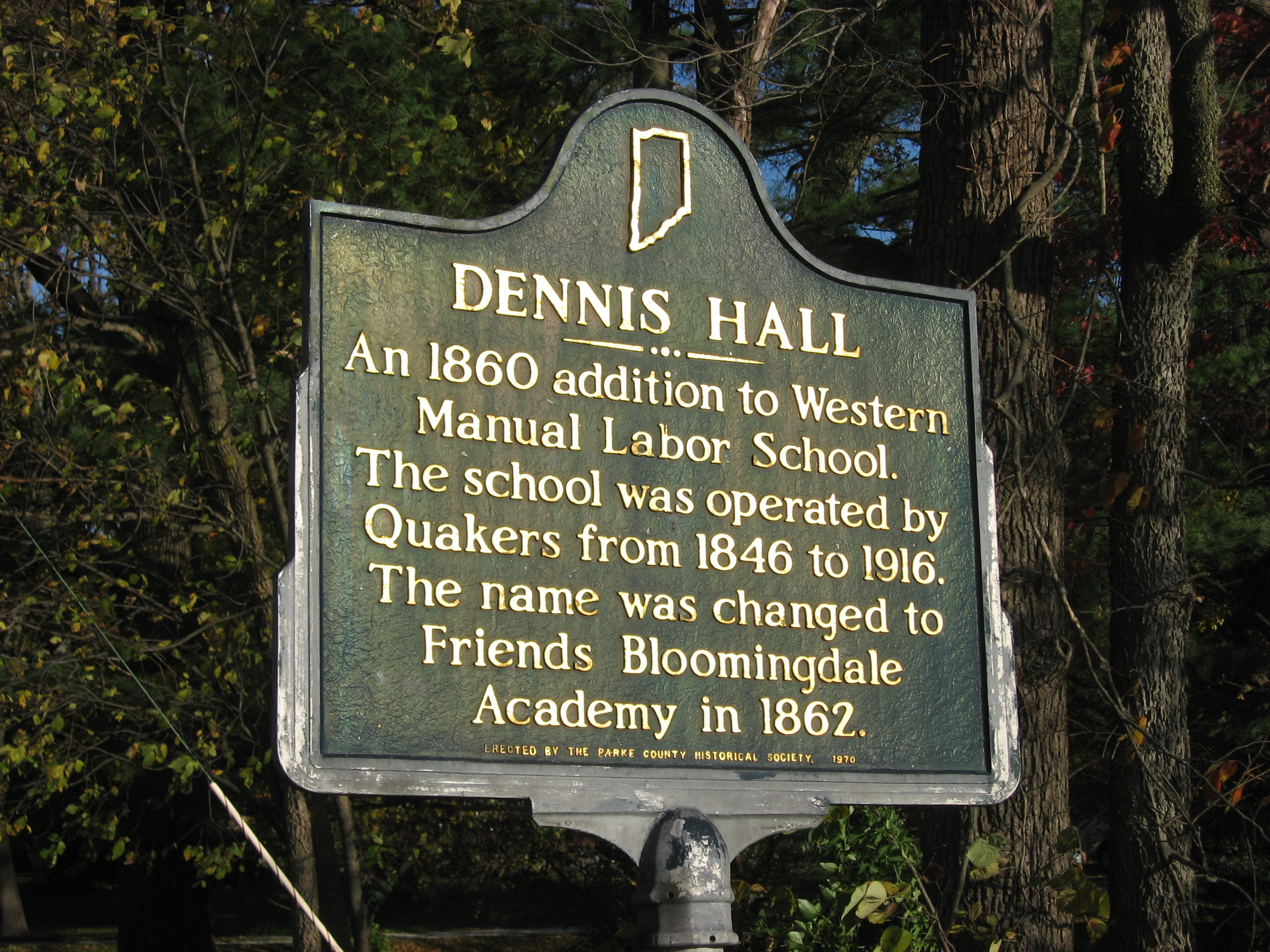
Dennis Hall historical marker

The buildings were extensive and commodius, and presented a handsome appearance located in the midst of the campus, in the shade of forest trees. In 1915, there were four buildings belonging to the academy. The main building, the gymnasium, the manual training shops and Dennis Hall. The class work was done in the main building. Dennis Hall contained the science and domestic science departments. The school had an extensive library.

== Grounds ==
The real estate of the institution originally comprised 40 acres (16 ha). The building erected on it was destroyed by fire in 1848 but rebuilt shortly afterward. Soon after establishment, it was soon discovered that the manual labor school system, which was very good in theory, was not at all practicable on the small scale tried in Bloomingdale, so it was abandoned, the name of the school changed to the Friends' Bloomingdale Academy, and the land, with the exception of 15 acres (6.1 ha) which then formed the campus of the academy, was sold.

== Administration ==
The school was in charge of a committee appointed by the Western Quarterly Meeting of Friends, of which James Siler, Exam Morris, William Pickard, Solomon Allen, and Alfred Hadley were the most prominent members and were reappointed for years. Harvey Thomas, the first principal, had charge of the Manual Training School until it was changed to the academy. In 1851, Barnabas C. Hobbs came from the Boarding School at Earlham and took charge of the academy. For the next 21 years while he was principal, Bloomingdale became an educational center of a wide range of territory and men, and hundreds of students received their life training and education here. Some of the principals who followed Professor Hobbs are: John Chawner, Seth Hasby, Thomas A. Armstrong, Josiah Edwards, D. N. Dannis, 1884; Hiram Hadley, 1885; A. F. Mitchell, 1888, and Caroline M. Hill, 1910. The staff of teachers varied from two to five, according to the number of pupils in attendance, which varied with the season of the year, the largest attendance being during the winter months.

== Notable alumni ==
There was a long list of the alumni of the academy extending back over sixty-eight years. Among the most noted ones were:

- Hon. Joe Cannon, in the 1840s
- Wallace N. Trueblood, 1869, professor of literature, Earlham College
- Edwin Morrison, 1884, professor of physics, Earlham College
- Robert L. Kelley, 1884, president of Earlham College
- William Hill, 1887, director of the Agricultural Department, Bethany College, West Virginia
- Harlow Lindley, 1893, professor of history and political science, Earlham College
- Herschel Coffin, 1897, professor of psychology, Earlham College
- Walter G. Glee, 1900, professor of physics, Agricultural College, Kansas
- Clyde Allee, Ph.D., 1902, professor of biology, Williamstown, Massachusetts
