= Rockport, Parke County, Indiana =

Unincorporated community in Indiana, United States

Rockport
- Unincorporated community
- Parke County's location in Indiana

- Location in Parke County
- Coordinates: 39°52′51″N 87°16′44″W
- Country: United States
- State: Indiana
- County: Parke
- Township: Penn
- Elevation: 492 ft (150 m)
- Time zone: UTC-5 (Eastern (EST))
  - Summer (DST): UTC-4 (EDT)
- ZIP code: 47832
- Area code: 765
- GNIS feature ID: 452172

Rockport is an unincorporated community in Penn Township, Parke County, in the U.S. state of Indiana.

== History ==
The community's name alludes to the rock cliffs over a local mill.

== Geography ==
Rockport is located at 39°52′51″N 87°16′44″W.
