= Bloomingdale, Indiana =

- Town
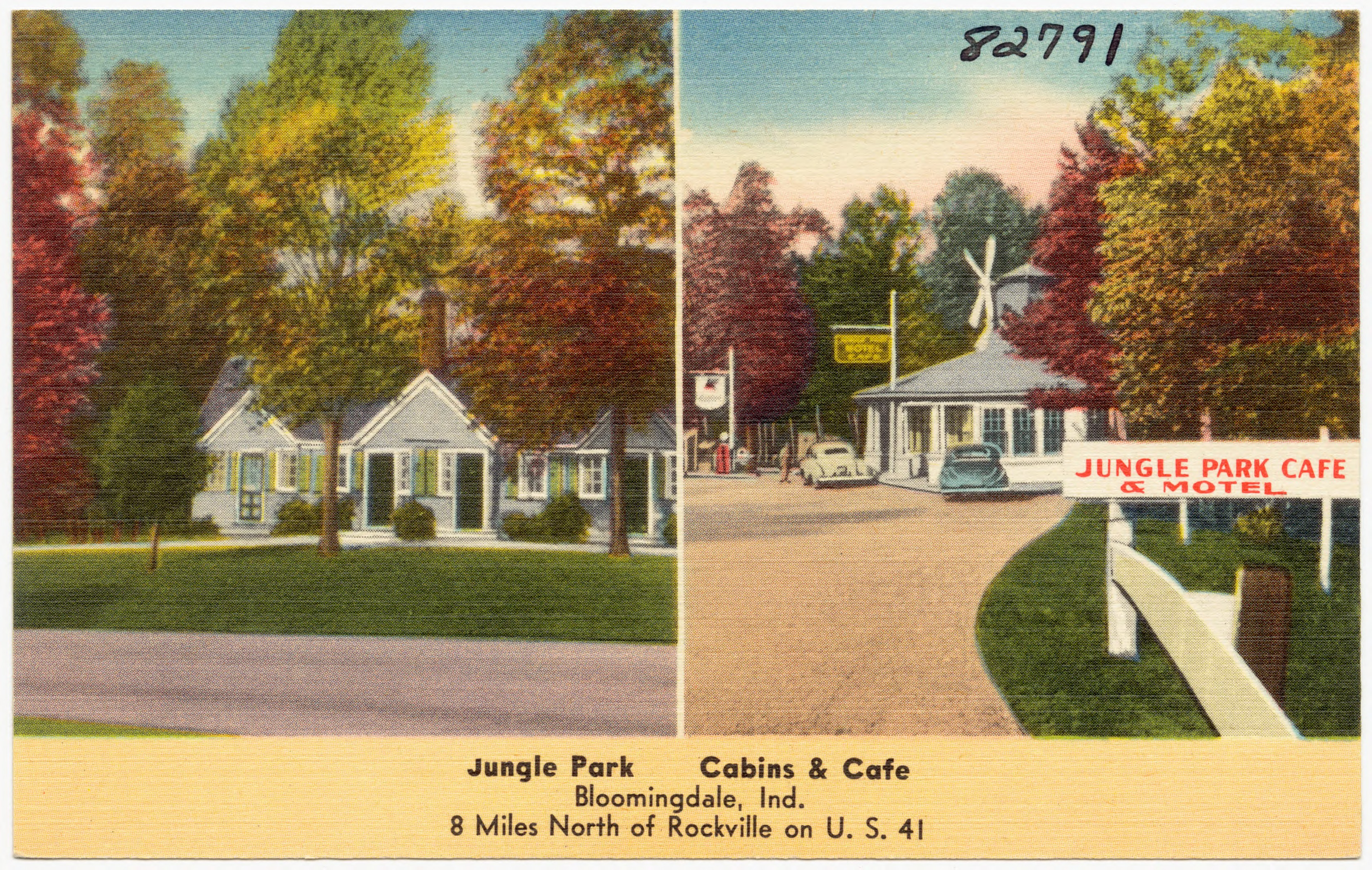

- Location of Bloomingdale in Parke County, Indiana.

- Location in Parke County
- Coordinates: 39°49′50″N 87°14′57″W
- Country: United States
- State: Indiana
- County: Parke
- Township: Penn

Area
  - Total: 0.58 sq mi (1.51 km^{2})
  - Land: 0.58 sq mi (1.51 km^{2})
  - Water: 0 sq mi (0.00 km^{2})
- Elevation: 646 ft (197 m)

Population (2020)
  - Total: 269
  - Density: 462.5/sq mi (178.59/km^{2})
- Time zone: UTC-6 (Eastern (EST))
  - Summer (DST): UTC-5 (EST)
- ZIP code: 47832
- Area code: 765
- FIPS code: 18-05788
- GNIS ID: 2396593

Bloomingdale is a town in Penn Township, Parke County, in the U.S. state of Indiana. The population was 269 at the 2020 census.

== History ==
The town of Bloomingdale was platted in 1825 or 1826, south of its present location. Originally it was named Bloomfield. A post office called Bloomingdale has been in operation since 1860. The Friends' Bloomingdale Academy was in operation from 1846 to 1916.

The William Hill Polygonal Barn was listed on the National Register of Historic Places in 1993.

On June 17, 2021, a magnitude 3.8 earthquake occurred 2 miles west of Bloomingdale. No damage was reported.

== Geography ==
Bloomingdale is located about 6 miles (9.7 km) north of the county seat of Rockville. U.S. Route 41 passes less than a mile to the east of the town.

According to the 2010 census, Bloomingdale has a total area of 0.58 square miles (1.50 km^{2}), all land.

== Demographics ==
Historical population
Census	Pop.	Note	%±
1880	355		—
1890	431		21.4%
1900	505		17.2%
1910	528		4.6%
1920	479		−9.3%
1930	412		−14.0%
1940	432		4.9%
1950	434		0.5%
1960	455		4.8%
1970	391		−14.1%
1980	409		4.6%
1990	341		−16.6%
2000	319		−6.5%
2010	335		5.0%
2020	269		−19.7%
U.S. Decennial Census

=== 2010 census ===
As of the 2010 census, there were 335 people, 129 households, and 96 families living in the town. The population density was 577.6 inhabitants per square mile (223.0/km^{2}). There were 150 housing units at an average density of 258.6 per square mile (99.8/km^{2}). The racial makeup of the town was 97.6% White, 0.3% African American, and 2.1% from two or more races. Hispanic or Latino of any race were 0.3% of the population.

There were 129 households, of which 35.7% had children under the age of 18 living with them, 55.8% were married couples living together, 14.0% had a female householder with no husband present, 4.7% had a male householder with no wife present, and 25.6% were non-families. 20.9% of all households were made up of individuals, and 11.6% had someone living alone who was 65 years of age or older. The average household size was 2.60 and the average family size was 3.02.

The median age in the town was 38.5 years. 23.6% of residents were under the age of 18; 10.9% were between the ages of 18 and 24; 22.8% were from 25 to 44; 30.2% were from 45 to 64; and 12.8% were 65 years of age or older. The gender makeup of the town was 50.4% male and 49.6% female.

=== 2000 census ===
As of the 2000 census, there were 319 people, 135 households, and 88 families living in the town. The population density was 558.7 inhabitants per square mile (215.7/km^{2}). There were 159 housing units at an average density of 278.5 per square mile (107.5/km^{2}). The racial makeup of the town was 99.06% White, 0.31% African American, 0.31% Pacific Islander, and 0.31% from two or more races.

There were 135 households, out of which 27.4% had children under the age of 18 living with them, 54.1% were married couples living together, 8.1% had a female householder with no husband present, and 34.8% were non-families. 31.1% of all households were made up of individuals, and 16.3% had someone living alone who was 65 years of age or older. The average household size was 2.36 and the average family size was 2.99.

In the town, the population was spread out, with 25.4% under the age of 18, 6.9% from 18 to 24, 29.5% from 25 to 44, 24.1% from 45 to 64, and 14.1% who were 65 years of age or older. The median age was 38 years. For every 100 females, there were 84.4 males. For every 100 females age 18 and over, there were 85.9 males.

The median income for a household in the town was $36,500, and the median income for a family was $46,071. Males had a median income of $27,308 versus $20,417 for females. The per capita income for the town was $17,928. About 2.2% of families and 2.0% of the population were below the poverty line, including none of those under age 18 and 4.9% of those age 65 or over.

=== Notable person ===
- Warder Clyde Allee, zoologist, ecologist, and namesake of the Allee effect

== Education ==
It is in the North Central Parke Community School Corporation. Formerly it was in the Turkey Run Community School Corporation school district.
